= List of shipwrecks in the Wisconsin Shipwreck Coast National Marine Sanctuary =

Sanctuary location

The Wisconsin Shipwreck Coast National Marine Sanctuary is a United States National Marine Sanctuary on Lake Michigan off the coast of the U.S. state of Wisconsin. It protects 38 known historically significant shipwrecks ranging from the 19th-century wooden schooners to 20th-century steel-hulled steamers, as well as an estimated 60 undiscovered shipwrecks. 28 of the wrecks are listed on the National Register of Historic Places.

== Shipwrecks within the sanctuary ==
Ship	Ship type	Build date	Sunk date	Depth	Notes	Coordinates	NRHP status	Image
Advance	Wooden schooner	1853	1885	85 feet (26 m)	On September 8, 1885, the 180-ton, two-masted schooner foundered southeast of Sheboygan, Wisconsin, with the loss of five members of her crew.	43°36.71′N 087°42.973′W	Listed	
Ahnapee	Wooden scow schooner	1876	1884	0 to 7 feet (0.0 to 2.1 m)	On June 9, 1884, the two-masted scow schooner ran aground on Sheboygan, Wisconsin's North Point in a fog. Her crew of six survived. Salvage attempts failed and she was abandoned.	43°47.110′N 087°42.635′W	Not listed	
Alaska	Wooden scow schooner	1869	1879	5 feet (1.5 m)	On March 23, 1879, the two-masted scow schooner was blown ashore near Two Creeks, Wisconsin, during a gale. Extensive salvage efforts failed to make her seaworthy, and in June 1881 she was declared a total loss. Set adrift and abandoned, she came to rest on the coast of Wisconsin south of Rawley Point.	44°11.607′N 087°30.677′W	Listed	
Algoma	Steam dredge	1918	1919	85 feet (26 m)	The steam dredge, also referred to as the McMullen and Pitz Dredge, sank in a storm off the coast of Wisconsin off Cleveland between Manitowoc and Sheboygan on November 18, 1919.	43°53.518′N 087°40.301′W	Not listed	
America	Wooden schooner	1873	1880	130 feet (40 m)	The three-masted schooner sank on September 28, 1880, after striking a scow under tow by the steam tugs A. W. Lawrence and M A. Gagnon just south of Kewaunee, Wisconsin, approximately 9 miles (14 km) north of Two Rivers Light and 4 miles (6.4 km) off the coast of Wisconsin.	44°21.048′N 087°26.850′W	Listed	
Arctic	Steam tug	1881	1930	15 feet (4.6 m)	The steam screw tug was beached and abandoned north of Manitowoc, Wisconsin, in 1930. Her enrollment documents were surrendered on January 17, 1930.	44°06.843′N 087°37.869′W	Listed	
Atlanta	Passenger steamer	1891	1906	17 feet (5.2 m)	The steam passenger ship burned to the waterline south of Sheboygan, Wisconsin, on March 18, 1906.	43°34.253′N 087°46.962′W	Listed	
Byron	Wooden schooner	1849	1867	135 feet (41 m)	The two-masted schooner sank 12 miles (19 km) southeast of Sheboygan, Wisconsin, on May 8, 1867.	43°36.310′N 087°41.268′W	Listed	
Continental	Wooden steam barge	1882	1904	15 feet (4.6 m)	The wooden steam barge ran aground on a sandbar off the coast of Wisconsin north of Rawley Point Light during a snowstorm on December 12, 1904. She broke up over the winter of 1904–1905.	44°13.932′N 087°30.462′W	Listed	
Ella Ellinwood	Wooden schooner	1870	1901		The three-masted schooner ran aground in smoke and mist on September 29, 1901, south of Port Washington, Wisconsin, near Fox Point, 14 miles (23 km) north of the Milwaukee harbor entrance. She became a total loss. The wreck's location reportedly is known but not on record with the State of Wisconsin.		Listed	
Floretta	Wooden schooner	1868	1885	170 feet (52 m)	The two-masted schooner foundered 11 miles (18 km) southeast of Manitowoc, Wisconsin, during a storm on September 18, 1885.	43°57.24′N 087°32.20′W	Listed	
Francis Hinton	Wooden steam barge	1889	1909	15 to 20 feet (4.6 to 6.1 m)	The wooden steam barge ran aground on the coast of Wisconsin in Maritime Bay 1.9 miles (3.1 km) northeast of the Manitowoc River during a storm on November 16, 1909. Her wreck eventually broke up and sank.	44°06.67′N 087°37.876′W	Listed	
Gallinipper	Wooden schooner	1833	1851	210 feet (64 m)	The two-masted schooner capsized 8 to 10 miles (13 to 16 km) off the coast of Wisconsin between Manitowoc and Sheboygan on July 7, 1851, and was abandoned. She was still afloat on July 9 and later still was seen 10 miles (16 km) southeast by south of Manitowoc. She eventually sank, becoming Wisconsin's oldest known shipwreck.		Listed	
Helvetia	Wooden schooner	1873	1921	165 feet (50 m)	The barge, a former three-masted schooner, was towed out into Lake Michigan on September 10, 1921, and deliberately set afire as a means of disposal. She burned to the waterline and sank approximately 10 miles (16 km) northeast of Sheboygan, Wisconsin.	43°47.401′N 087°36.429′W	Not listed	
Henry Gust	Wooden fish tug	1893	1935	85 feet (26 m)	The wooden steam fish tug was towed into Lake Michigan off Two Rivers, Wisconsin, in August 1935 and set afire as a means of disposal. She remained afloat, so a United States Coast Guard vessel rammed and sank her.	44°08.398′N 087°29.29′W	Not listed	
Hetty Taylor	Wooden schooner	1874	1880	105 feet (32 m)	The wooden schooner capsized and sank in a squall about 5 miles (8 km) off Sheboygan, Wisconsin, on August 26, 1880. She came to rest on the bottom with 8 feet (2.4 m) of her main topmast protruding above the surface.	43°40.890′N 087°39.290′W	Listed	
Home	Wooden schooner	1843	1858	170 feet (52 m)	The two-masted schooner sank on October 17, 1858, after colliding with the schooner William Fiske in a dense fog southeast of Manitowoc, Wisconsin.	43°56.932′N 087°33.211′W	Listed	
I. A. Johnson	Wooden schooner	1867	1890	93 feet (28 m)	The two-masted scow schooner sank on September 23, 1890, off Centerville, Wisconsin, 8 miles (13 km) north of Sheboygan, Wisconsin, after colliding with the schooner Lincoln Dall off the mouth of the Black River just south of Sheboygan.	43.892163°N 087.651535°W	Listed	
Island City	Wooden schooner	1859	1894	135 feet (41 m)	The two-masted schooner sank 9 miles (14 km) southeast of Port Washington, Wisconsin, during a storm on April 8, 1894.	43°14.39′N 087°50.73′W	Listed	
LaSalle	Wooden schooner	1874	1875	12 feet (3.7 m)	The three-masted schooner was driven ashore at Two Rivers Point (now Rawley Point) on the coast of Wisconsin during a gale on October 25, 1875. The wreck was stripped and abandoned.	44°11.524′N 087°30.591′W	Listed	
Linda E	Steel fish tug	1937	1998	260 feet (79 m)	The steel-hulled fish tug disappeared on Lake Michigan near Port Washington, Wisconsin, on December 11, 1998. Her wreck was discovered on June 18, 2000, 7 miles (11 km) off the coast of Wisconsin, and a subsequent investigation concluded that she sank with the loss of her entire crew of three men within a few seconds of colliding with an integrated tug and barge on the day she disappeared.		Not listed	
Lookout	Wooden schooner	1855	1897	10 feet (3 m)	During a gale, the three-masted schooner was stranded 200 yards (183 m) off Rawley Point on the coast of Wisconsin approximately 5 miles (8 km) north of Two Rivers on April 29, 1897.	44°11.707′N 087°30.596′W	Listed	
Mahoning	Wooden brigantine	1847	1864	55 feet (17 m)	The brigantine ran aground near the mouth of the Black River 4 miles (6.4 km) south of Sheboygan, Wisconsin, during a gale on November 4, 1864. She was refloated, then sank on December 2, 1864, while under tow to Milwaukee for repairs.	43°20.432′N 087°51.215′W	Not listed	
Major Anderson	Wooden brigantine	1861	1871	3 to 10 feet (0.9 to 3.0 m)	Sailing in dense smoke from forest fires and heavy gale conditions, the three-masted barkentine ran aground on October 7, 1871, on the coast of Wisconsin on Rawley Point near the mouth of Molash Creek 4 miles (6.4 km) north of Two Rivers.	44°10.928′N 087°30.978′W	Listed	
Niagara	Wooden paddle steamer	1845	1856	55 feet (17 m)	The palace steamer, a sidewheel paddle steamer, burned to the waterline and sank northeast of Port Washington, Wisconsin, on September 24, 1856, killing 60 of her 300 passengers.	43°29.31′N 087°46.490′W	Listed	
Northerner	Wooden schooner	1851	1868	140 feet (43 m)	The two-masted schooner capsized and sank in a storm off Ula, Wisconsin, southeast of Port Washington on November 29, 1868.	43°19.00′N 087°48.64′W	Listed	
Pathfinder	Wooden schooner	1869	1886	15 feet (4.6 m)	While under tow, the three-masted schooner broke her towline in a gale and snowstorm and ran aground on the coast of Wisconsin 2.5 miles (4 km) north of Two Rivers on November 18, 1886. She broke up a few days later.	44°14.429′N 087°30.397′W	Listed	
Robert C. Pringle	Wooden tug	1903	1922	300 feet (91 m)	The steam screw tug struck a submerged object while towing the steamer Venezuela and sank immediately southeast of Sheboygan, Wisconsin, on June 19, 1922.	43°41.508′N 087°33.292′W	Listed	
Rouse Simmons	Wooden schooner	1868	1912	165 feet (50 m)	The three-masted schooner was last seen flying a distress signal 5 miles (8 km) off Kewaunee, Wisconsin, during a gale on November 22, 1912. In 1971, her wreck was discovered 6 miles (9.7 km) northeast of Rawley Point and 12 miles (19 km) northeast of Two Rivers, Wisconsin.	44°16.640′N 087°24.863′W	Listed	
S.C. Baldwin	Wooden steam barge	1871	1908	70 to 75 feet (21 to 23 m)	The steam barge capsized, then righted herself and sank northeast of Two Rivers, Wisconsin, on August 27, 1908.	44°10.873′N 087°29.179′W	Listed	
Selah Chamberlain	Wooden steam bare	1873	1886	90 feet (27 m)	The steam barge sank off the coast of Wisconsin 2 miles (3.2 km) northeast of Sheboygan Point, on October 13, 1886, after colliding with John Pridgeon Jr.	43°46.196′N 087°39.401′W	Listed	
Senator	Steel cargo ship	1896	1929	460 feet (140 m)	The steel-hulled steam cargo ship, a bulk carrier converted to carry automobiles, sank off the coast of Wisconsin 16 miles (26 km) northeast of Port Washington on October 31, 1929, after colliding with the bulk carrier Marquette.	43°20′08″N 087°34′11″W	Listed	
Silver Lake	Wooden scow schooner	1889	1900	210 feet (64 m)	The three-masted scow schooner was cut nearly in two in a collision with Pere Marquette on May 28, 1900, and sank northeast of Sheboygan, Wisconsin.	43°48.37′N 087°34.66′W	Listed	
Tennie and Laura	Wooden scow schooner	1876	1903	325 feet (99 m)	The two-masted scow schooner capsized in a gale on August 2, 1903, off the coast of Wisconsin northeast of Milwaukee and 9 miles (14 km) southeast of Port Washington.	43°41.494′N 087°33.298′W	Listed	
Toledo	Wooden cargo liner	1854	1856	20 feet (6.1 m)	The steam screw cargo liner ran aground just north of the entrance to the harbor at Port Washington, Wisconsin, while trying to dock at Port Washington during a storm on October 22, 1856. She sank with the loss of approximately 40 lives and subsequently broke up.	43°23.331′N 087°51.333′W	Not listed	
Unidentified wreckage	Wooden vessel			10 feet (3 m)	The scattered wreckage, possibly of a wooden schooner, lies on the coast of Wisconsin 6 miles (9.7 km) north of Sheboygan.		Not listed	
Vernon	Wooden cargo ship	1886	1887	210 feet (64 m)	The steam screw cargo ship sank off the coast of Wisconsin northeast of Two Rivers on 29 October 1887, during a gale.	44°12.125′N 087°24.738′W	Not listed	
Walter B. Allen	Wooden schooner	1866	1880	165 to 170 feet (50 to 52 m)	The two-masted schooner was under tow to a shipyard for repairs when she sank northeast of Sheboygan, Wisconsin, on April 17, 1880, in a gale and heavy snowstorm.	43°49.821′N 087°36.522′W	Listed	

== See also ==
- List of Great Lakes shipwrecks on the National Register of Historic Places
- List of shipwrecks in the Great Lakes
