= SS S. C. Baldwin =

Wooden-hulled steam barge sunk in Lake Michigan

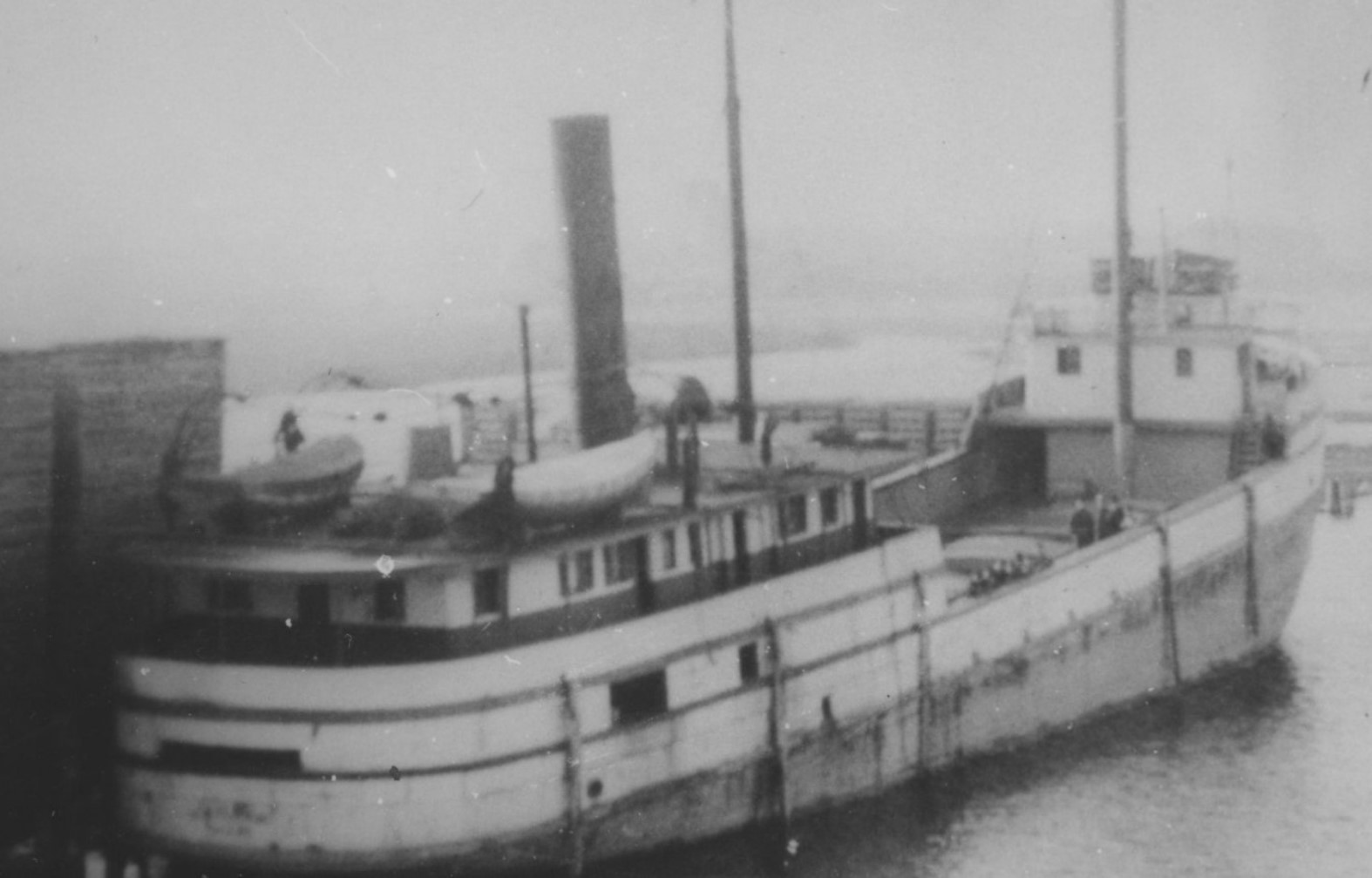

History

United States
- Name: S. C. Baldwin
- Owner: Adolph Green
- Builder: Campbell, Owen & Company
- Launched: 1871
- In service: 1871
- Out of service: August 27, 1908
- Identification: U.S. Registry #23957
- Fate: Sank 1908

General characteristics
- Tonnage: 418 GRT
- Length: 160 ft (49 m)
- Beam: 30 ft (9.1 m)
- Depth: 10 ft (3.0 m)
- Installed power: High pressure steam engine

National Register of Historic Places data
S. C. Baldwin Shipwreck (barge)
U.S. National Register of Historic Places
Location within Wisconsin Location within the United States
Location	2.3 miles (3.7 km) SSE of Rawley Point Light in Lake Michigan
Nearest city	Two Rivers, Wisconsin
Coordinates	44.193011°N 87.453247°W
Built	1871
Architect	Stephen R. Kirby
Architectural style	Steam barge
NRHP reference No.	16000565
Added to NRHP	August 22, 2016

SS S. C. Baldwin was a wooden-hulled steam barge built in 1871, that capsized in a storm on August 26, 1908, on Lake Michigan, off Two Rivers, Wisconsin, United States, with the loss of one life. On August 22, 2016 the remnants of S. C. Baldwin were listed in the National Register of Historic Places as reference number 16000565.

== History ==
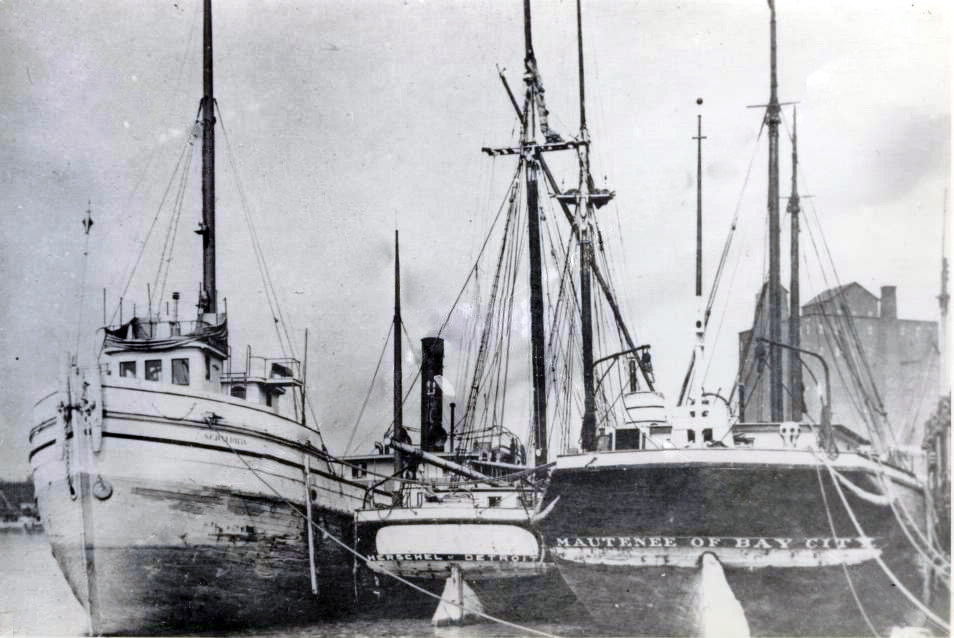
S. C. Baldwin with two schooners

S. C. Baldwin (Official number 23957) was built in 1871 by Campbell, Owen & Company of Detroit, Michigan for the Escanaba & Lake Michigan Transportation Company to carry iron ore from Escanaba, Michigan to the ports of Chicago, Illinois and Milwaukee, Wisconsin. She was named after an officer of the Chicago & Northwestern Railroad. She had a length of 160 feet (49 m), her beam was 30 feet (9.1 m) wide and her cargo hold was 11 feet (3.4 m) deep. She had a gross register tonnage of 418 tons. She was powered by a high pressure steam engine that was built by the Dry Dock Engine Works, and had a cylinder with a 26-inch (660 mm) bore and a stroke measuring 32 inches (810 mm), and "double crank". At the start of her career she had a single deck.

In March of 1873 S. C. Baldwin had a second deck added in Chicago, Illinois, this increased her gross register tonnage to 634 tons, and is believed to have made her the first double decked steamer on the lakes. On April 30, 1876 she went ashore at North Point Reef on Lake Huron. On June 18, 1876 S. C. Baldwin collided with the schooner Ellen Spry off Kewaunee, Wisconsin. On April 28, 1877, S. C. Baldwin went ashore near Alpena, Michigan, and was repaired afterwards in Detroit, Michigan. In 1879 S. C. Baldwin was sold to the Inter Ocean Transportation Company of Milwaukee, Wisconsin. In April 1882 she was sold to David Whitney Jr. of Detroit, Michigan, and her second deck was removed in order to refit her for the lumber trade. after the refit, S. C. Baldwin's gross register tonnage was reevaluated to 412.5 tons. In 1884 it was reported that she was damaged near Ashland, Wisconsin. Following engine failure, and a storm near Port Colborne, Ontario. she was rebuilt with steel arches, and her original engine was replaced with a 450-horsepower (340 kW) Steeple compound engine that had a cylinder with a 37-by-32-inch (940 mm × 810 mm) bore and a stroke measuring 21 inches (530 mm). In September 1886 S. C. Baldwin went aground in Lake George in the St. Marys River with the freighter R.J. Hackett; both of them were released by the tug Mystic. In 1891 she was sold to the Whitney Transportation Company of Hamtramck, Michigan. In 1892 S. C. Baldwin was sold to S.R. MacLaren of Toledo, Ohio. On November 5, 1894 S. C. Baldwin collided with the steamer Iron King off Marine City, Michigan, and sank in 35 feet (11 m) of water.

In 1903 S. C. Baldwin was traveling from Green Bay, Wisconsin to Buffalo, New York with a cargo of lumber when she struck an ice pack and sank in Green Bay, about 10 miles (16 km) north of the entrance to the Fox River, near Long Tail Point. The tugs Wright and Nelson went to try and raise S. C. Baldwin, but could only move her 25 feet (7.6 m). This caused her cargo of lumber to roll off her deck, and break her upper cabin structure off. In April, 1904 S. C. Baldwin was raised, and purchased by Adolph Green of the Green Stone Company. Despite some damage to her rudder and her keel, her hull remained mostly intact. In July, 1904 the Green Stone Company decided to convert S. C. Baldwin to a barge, and removed her machinery in the winter of 1904. In June 1905 S. C. Baldwin started hauling limestone from Sturgeon Bay, Wisconsin to Milwaukee, Wisconsin, and other ports up Lake Michigan's west coast.

== Final voyage ==
On August 26, 1908 S. C. Baldwin, and scow No.37 were headed south from Sturgeon Bay, Wisconsin with a cargo of stone, in tow of the tug Torrent. The three vessels encountered a storm as they were passing Kewaunee, Wisconsin, and at around midnight, S. C. Baldwin began taking on water. At around 3:00 A.M., she capsized and remained unnoticed by the crew of Torrent until sunrise. When she capsized, two of her crew members jumped off, leaving a single crewman clinging to her hull. When Torrent's crew realized she had capsized, they cut the line connecting the vessel. S. C. Baldwin turned over again, and sank. After the remaining crewman was rescued, Torrent went to search for the missing crew members. After her crew didn't find S. C. Baldwin's crew, they sailed to Manitowoc, Wisconsin to tell the lifesaving station. after this, Torrent and some other vessels went back to retrieve scow No.37, and search for the missing men. On August 28, Captain George Heim, the Captain of S. C. Baldwin was located by the Goodrich Transportation Company vessel Caroline. A few days later, the body of Jacob Witgen, the other crewman washed ashore near Kewaunee, Wisconsin.

== S. C. Baldwin today ==
The wreck of S. C. Baldwin was discovered sometime in the mid-1970s by sport fishermen who reported her location to divers. Her wreck is a popular recreational dive site, as she lies in only 75 feet (23 m) of water. Her wreck sits upright, with her stempost intact. Other than her stempost, her wreck consists of her stern, her stern deck and her transom. In 2015 the Wisconsin Historical Society conducted a full archeological survey of her wreck.
