= Schmeichel =

Schmeichel is the name of several people:

- Dean Schmeichel (born 1973), Canadian wrestler
- Ewald J. Schmeichel (1889–1975), American politician
- Peter Schmeichel (born 1963), Danish footballer
- Kasper Schmeichel (born 1986), Danish footballer, son of Peter Schmeichel

Animals

- Schmeichel, a dog in the British soap opera Coronation Street - see Chesney Brown § Storylines
