= Point Beach =

There are several uses for the term Point Beach, both in northern Manitowoc County, Wisconsin:

- Point Beach Nuclear Plant, a nuclear power plant
- Point Beach State Forest, a state forest
