= Lester Public Library =

Coordinates: 44.14349°N 87.56917°W

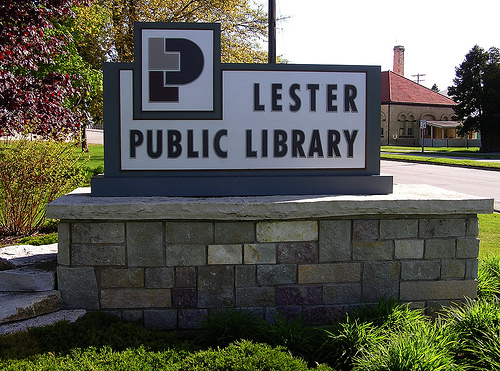
- Location: Two Rivers, Wisconsin, United States
- Type: Public
- Established: 1891
- Branch of: Manitowoc Calumet Library System

Access and use
- Circulation: 225,622
- Population served: 15,686

Other information
- Public transit access: Maritime Metro Transit
- Website: www.lesterlibrary.org

Lester Public Library is a public library in Two Rivers, Wisconsin, United States.

== History ==
The library is the result of a project begun in 1890, when members of the Two Rivers Branch of the Chautauqua Reading Circle met to consider the establishment of a public library and reading room. Leopold Mann donated $500 and the land for the building and Mrs. Mary Mann donated an additional $1,000 toward the building on the condition that the new library be named after her late husband, Joseph.

On December 17, 1891 the Joseph Mann library opened to the public. The total cost of the library including building, heater, furniture and the initial book collection was $3,363.73. Lizzie H. Yahnke was the first librarian.

In 1914, Two Rivers built its new Carnegie library, still called the Joseph Mann Library, but located across the street from the original library. Though extensively remodeled and expanded during the 1950s and 60s, community leaders soon recognized that a more modern and spacious facility would be needed.

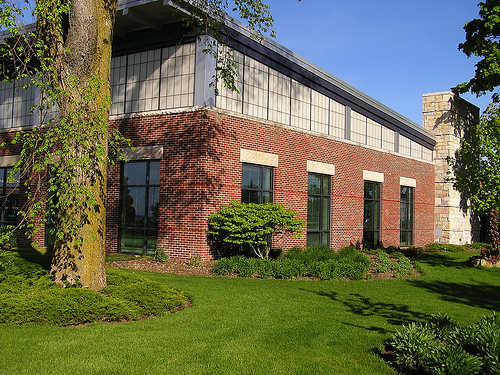
Exterior in Spring

On May 15, 1995, James Lester, chairman of the Board and CEO of Eggers Industries of Two Rivers, and his wife Barbee offered the Two Rivers City Council $1 million toward the construction of a new library. The City Council readily accepted and on June 28, 1997 the Lester Public Library—named in honor of Jim's parents, George and Marcia Lester—opened for business.

Lester Public Library sits on the shores of Lake Michigan in the city of Two Rivers, Wisconsin. It is the second largest library in Manitowoc County and is a member of the Manitowoc Calumet Library System. Total service population is 15,686; the library circulated 225,622 items to 151,503 visitors in 2009.
