= Lester W. Bentley =

American artist (1908–1972)

- Born: 1908; Two Rivers, Wisconsin, U.S.
- Died: 1972 (aged 63–64); Madison, Wisconsin, U.S.
- Education: Art Institute of Chicago
- Known for: Portraiture
- Style: Lithography
- Spouse: Constance Loilen

Lester W. Bentley (1908–1972) was an American artist from Wisconsin. He is most well known for painting portraits and murals. The two portraits he is most famous for painting are of President Dwight D. Eisenhower and U.S. Supreme Court Chief Justice William O. Douglas. Bentley painted the portrait of President Dwight D. Eisenhower in 1954 for Columbia University.

== Early life and education ==
Bentley was born in 1908 in Two Rivers, Wisconsin. He knew from the age of seven that he wanted to be an artist. By the time he was thirteen, he had his first exhibit, held in Manitowoc. Bentley received a four-year scholarship to the Art Institute of Chicago. From 1930 to 1934, he studied under artists, Karl Buehr, Louis Ritman, and Boris Ansfield. Prior to this, he was working in a commercial art studio.

== Career ==
Bentley taught art at Two Rivers Vocational School for one year. He painted murals for Sacred Heart Church and the De Pere Post Office in Wisconsin. During World War II, Bentley's title was Chief Petty Officer. He created recruitment posters, his most famous being SPARS, which depicted women in U.S. Coast Guard attire. In 1946, Bentley was discharged.

His specialty was portraiture. Among many others, his subjects included, President Dwight D. Eisenhower as well as Supreme Court Justice William O'Douglas, Fred R. Zimmerman, Cardinal Mooney, Wisconsin Governor Oscar Rennenbohm, and Conrad Elvehjem.

Bentley was also a lithographer.

During his career, Bentley took painting trips to Mexico, Haiti, and Cuba.

== Personal life ==
Bentley was married to Constance Lolien. He died in 1972. He had three sons in Greenwich CT. George Mark Bentley, Luke William Bentley and Claude Lolien Bentley.
