= Jonas Gagnon =

American politician

Jonas Gagnon (August 31, 1846 – July 3, 1915) was an American businessman, tugboat captain, and politician. He was a member of the Wisconsin State Assembly.

Born in Dunham, Canada, Gagnon and his parents emigrated to the United States in 1849 and settled in Two Rivers, Wisconsin. Gagnon worked in the fishing industry and was the captain of the tug boat: M. E. Gagnon, that Gagnon and his brothers owned. Then Gagnon and his brothers own Gagnon Brothers a mercantile business in Two Rivers. Gagnon served on the Two Rivers Common Council, the Manitowoc County, Wisconsin Board of Supervisors, and school commissioner on the Two Rivers School Board. From 1899 to 1903, Gagnon served in the Wisconsin State Assembly as a Democrat. Gagnon died at his home in Two Rivers, Wisconsin.
