= John J. Mertens =

American politician

John J. Mertens was a member of the South Dakota House of Representatives and the South Dakota Senate.

== Biography ==
Mertens was born on July 16, 1869, in Two Rivers, Wisconsin. He attended Hamline University and served in the United States Army, achieving the rank of captain.

== Political career ==
Mertens was a member of the House of Representatives from 1909 to 1912 and of the Senate from 1921 to 1924. He was a Republican.
