= Two Rivers Light =

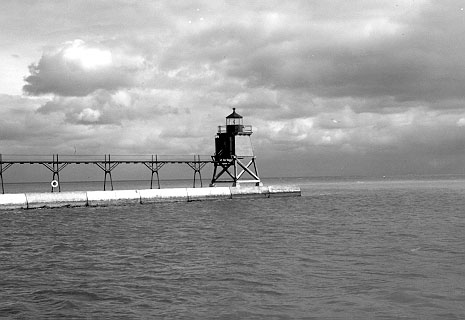
- the Two Rivers Light in service (USCG)
- Location: originally at end of north breakwater in Two Rivers, WI; relocated to museum
- Coordinates: 44°8′34.03″N 87°33′37.66″W (original); 44.1532°N 87.5624°W (current)

Tower
- Constructed: 1886
- Foundation: Wood
- Construction: Wood
- Height: 36 feet (11 m)
- Shape: Skeletal tower
- Markings: Red with white lantern

Light
- Deactivated: 1969
- Lens: Sixth order Fresnel lens
- Characteristic: fixed red

The Two Rivers Light (also known as the Two Rivers North Pierhead Light) is a lighthouse formerly located at the harbor entrance to Two Rivers, Wisconsin. It is now located in a museum in the city.

== History ==
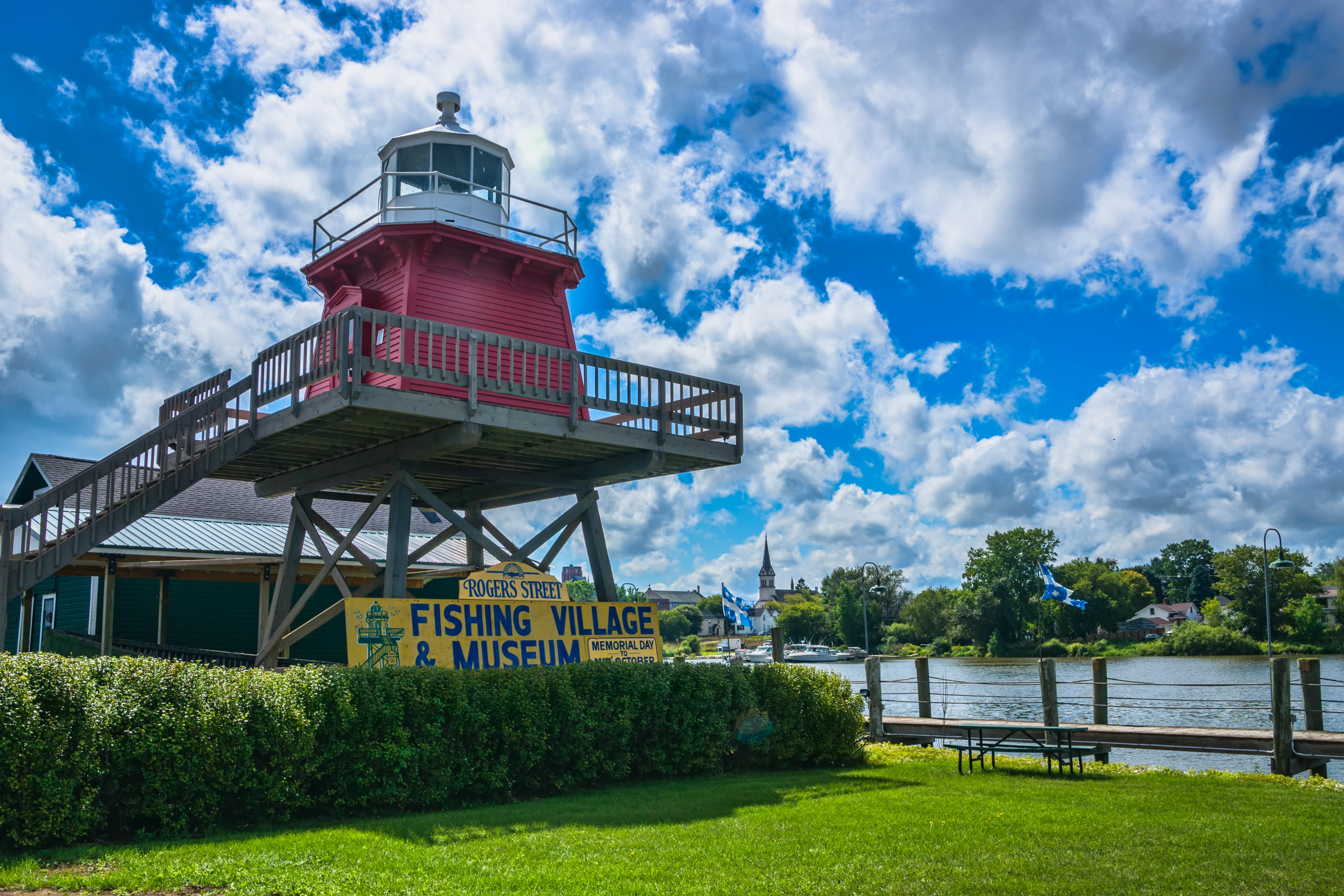
Two Rivers Lighthouse located at Rogers Street Fishing Village and Museum.

This light was preceded by a brick structure on shore, one and a half stories with a cupola. This light was erected in 1852 and lasted only until 1858.

A project to improve the harbor was begun in 1870, including the construction in stages of a pair of breakwaters defining the entrance channel. In 1886 a lighthouse was built at the end of the northern breakwater. A simple pyramidal wooden tower was constructed, consisting of a watch room on an open timber framework surmounted by the lantern. A sixth-order Fresnel lens was provided as the light source, displaying a fixed red light.

This light contained no dwelling. The Rawley Point Light keeper tended it, accessing the light via a long catwalk running the length of the pier.

The light was damaged in the first month of operation when a vessel struck the pier. In 1907–1909 a dwelling and oil house were constructed on the site of the former shore light. At the same time a fog bell was added to the light, its mechanism powered by a generator which was housed in a shed at the other end of the pier. This arrangement was found unsatisfactory, and a diaphone was added sometime between 1926 and 1931. During repairs in 1928 to fix storm damage, the light was rebuilt to run off electrical power. It continued in operation until 1969, when it was replaced with a steel tower. The older building was saved, however, and in 1975 the house portion was donated to the Rogers Street Fishing Village, a museum encompassing the old coast guard lifesaving station. The old building now stands on a platform similar to its original foundation, though it is now surrounded by a raised walkway. Unfortunately during the move the lens was broken, but a 2006 grant provided funds for its repair and restoration, and it was returned to display in 2009.

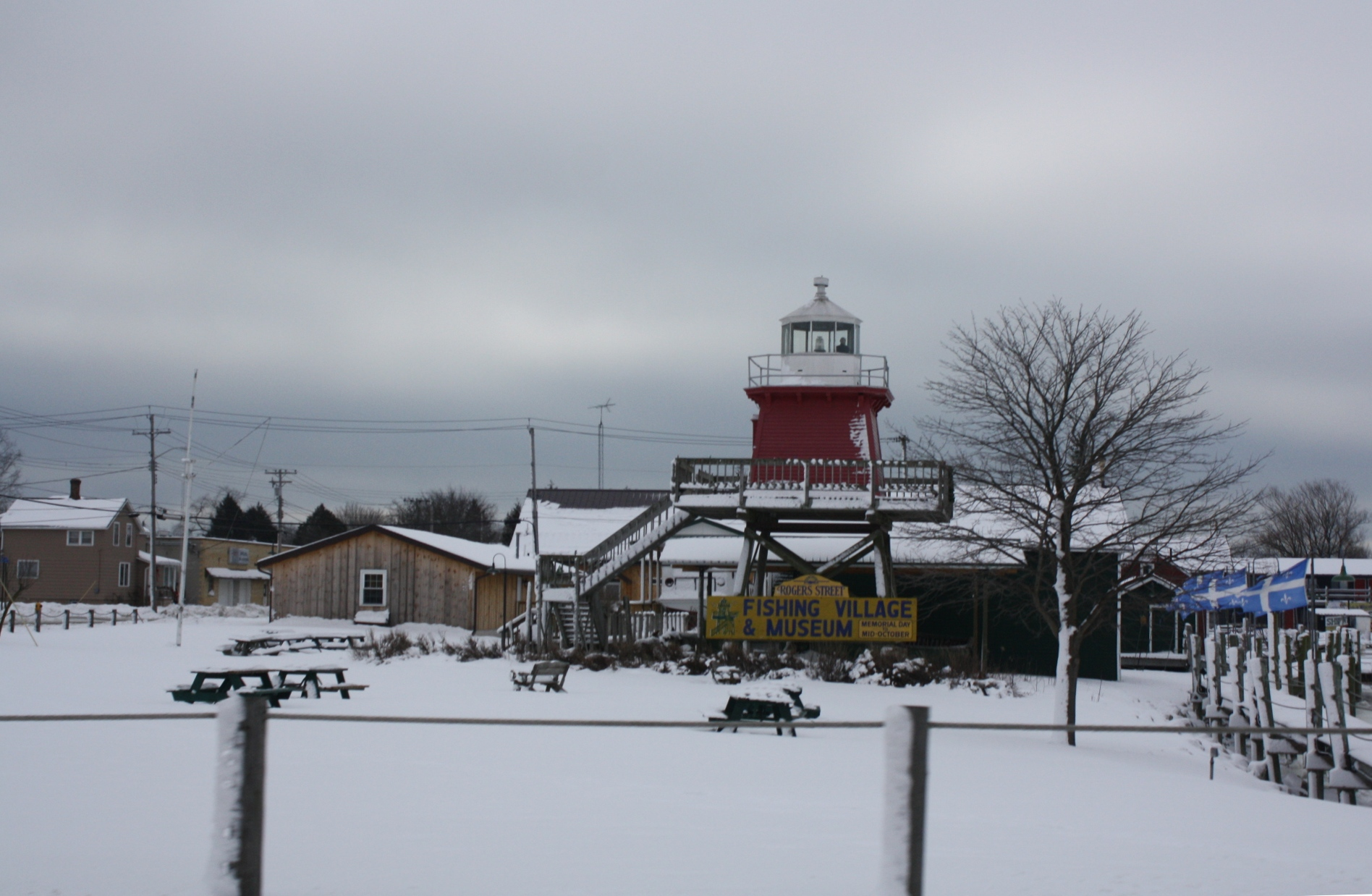
the light in its current location
