= Matt Konop =

American military personnel

Lieutenant Colonel Matt Konop (February 6, 1906 – May 12, 1983) was a United States Army officer during World War II, noted for his fighting in the Battle of the Bulge and celebrated in the Czech Republic for his role in the liberation of the city of Plzeň and the town of Domažlice in Czechoslovakia near the end of the war.

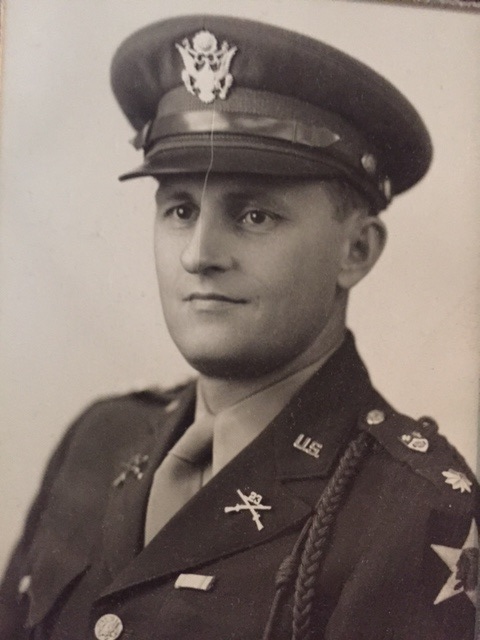
Colonel Matt Konop after World War II

In early May 1945, Konop was made the commander of the 2nd Infantry Division advance party by Second Infantry Division Commanding Officer General Walter M. Robertson, who had learned of Konop's Czech lineage and ability to speak the language. Konop's advance force coincidentally liberated the same Czech villages where his grandparents had lived before they emigrated to America. During the liberation, news spread throughout the region that "one of our own" had returned to free the people from six years of occupation by Nazi Germany.

Today, a bronze plaque of Konop is mounted on the Hruška building in the main square of Domažlice in the Czech Republic, where he parked his jeep on May 4, 1945, and received a hero's welcome in the closing days of the war. In 2016, Konop was made an honorary citizen of the town of Domažlice.

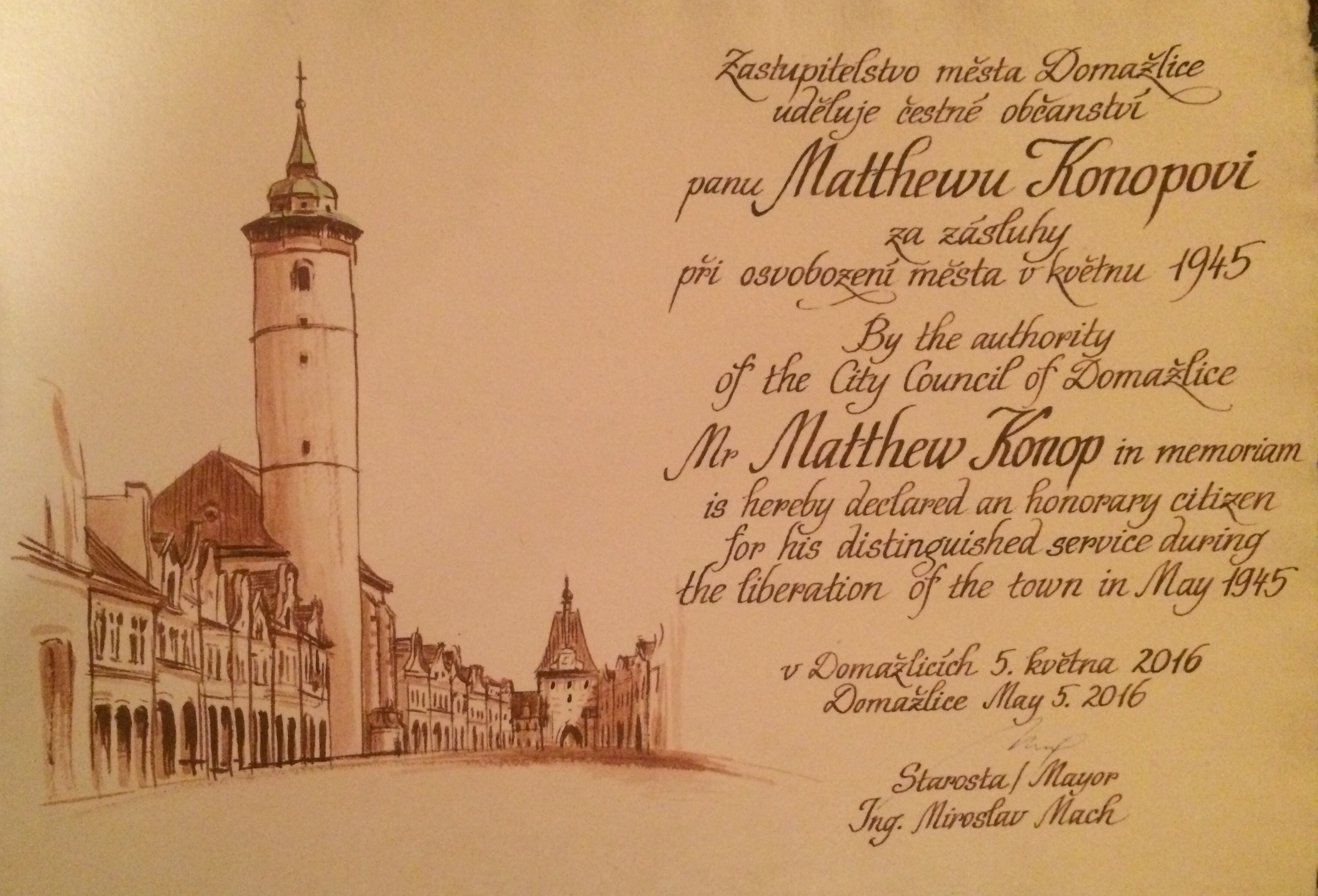
Document from the town of Domažlice granting honorary citizenship to Col. Matt Konop in May 2016.

== Early life ==
Konop was born in Stangelville, Wisconsin, twenty miles southeast of Green Bay in Kewaunee County. His grandparents were peasants who had emigrated to Wisconsin in the late 1860s from the Chodsko region in southern Bohemia, in what is now the Czech Republic. They joined an enclave of other Czech immigrants amidst the patchwork of German, Belgian, Irish, and other Western Europeans who were transforming the old growth white pine forest of northeastern Wisconsin into dairy farms. Konop was raised speaking Czech on the family farm, the oldest of 11 children, and graduated in 1924 from Kewaunee High School.

== World War II ==
In late 1940, Konop received a letter from the U.S. Army strongly encouraging him to enlist full-time as an officer. Konop enlisted and drove with his wife and three small children from Wisconsin to Fort Sam Houston in San Antonio, Texas, where he was stationed. He entered with the rank of captain in the 2nd Infantry Division and had been promoted to lieutenant colonel by the time he joined combat forces for the landing on Omaha Beach on June 7, 1944, the day after D-Day. He was the division's Commander of Special Troops and the Commandant of the Divisional Command Post for the duration of the war.

== Battle of the Bulge ==
On the morning of December 17, 1944, Konop led a hastily assembled group of cooks, jeep drivers, and MPs to defend the command post in Wirtzfeld, Belgium, against a German SS Panzer Tank platoon attack. It was the beginning of Germany's massive surprise offensive known as the Battle of the Bulge. The 2nd Infantry Division command post was virtually unguarded; Konop's notes from the day prior to the attack revealed that even into the evening of the 16th, when reports that German tanks had broken through the 106th Division were relayed to him, they were thought to be only a local enemy action, and not a main part of the attack. The goal of the German offensive was to break through the American line to the Meuse River and then to port city of Antwerp, Belgium, separating the Allied armies and reversing months of German losses. Of the battle for Wirtzfeld, General Walter E. Lauer, Commanding Officer of the 99th Infantry Division said, "The enemy had the keys to success in its hand but didn’t realize it." At one point in the battle, German tanks were within 200 yards of the command post. For his gallantry in action during the battle, Konop was awarded the Bronze Star.

== Czech liberation ==
On April 30, 1945, the 2nd Infantry Division was moved under the command of General George S. Patton’s Third Army to take on the liberation of southern Czechoslovakia. When the division’s commander, General Robertson, learned of Konop’s ability to speak Czech (the division had no Czech translator), Konop was given the assignment to lead the division’s advance party into the country. On May 2, Konop and his jeep driver entered Czechoslovakia, and arrived in the market town of Klenčí pod Čerchovem, which happened to be the former home of Konop's maternal grandmother. In the town, they found a secret meeting of the local resistance. Konop informed the Czechs, in their language, that his division was coming to free their country. The men burst into a celebration of the news, and the Czechs were amazed that the first US Army officer to tell them they were free spoke their language and had a surname common to the area.

By the time Konop made camp that night at the Benda family house in Klenčí pod Čerchovem, word had spread among the Czechs in the area that they had been "liberated by one of our own." Two days later, on May 4, Konop entered the district capital town of Domažlice and found banners in the main square in Czech welcoming him as their liberator. As the citizens celebrated the end of the six-year Nazi reign of terror, a group of people in the square recognized Konop, hoisted him upon their shoulders, and paraded him around the main square as a hero who had returned to free his people.

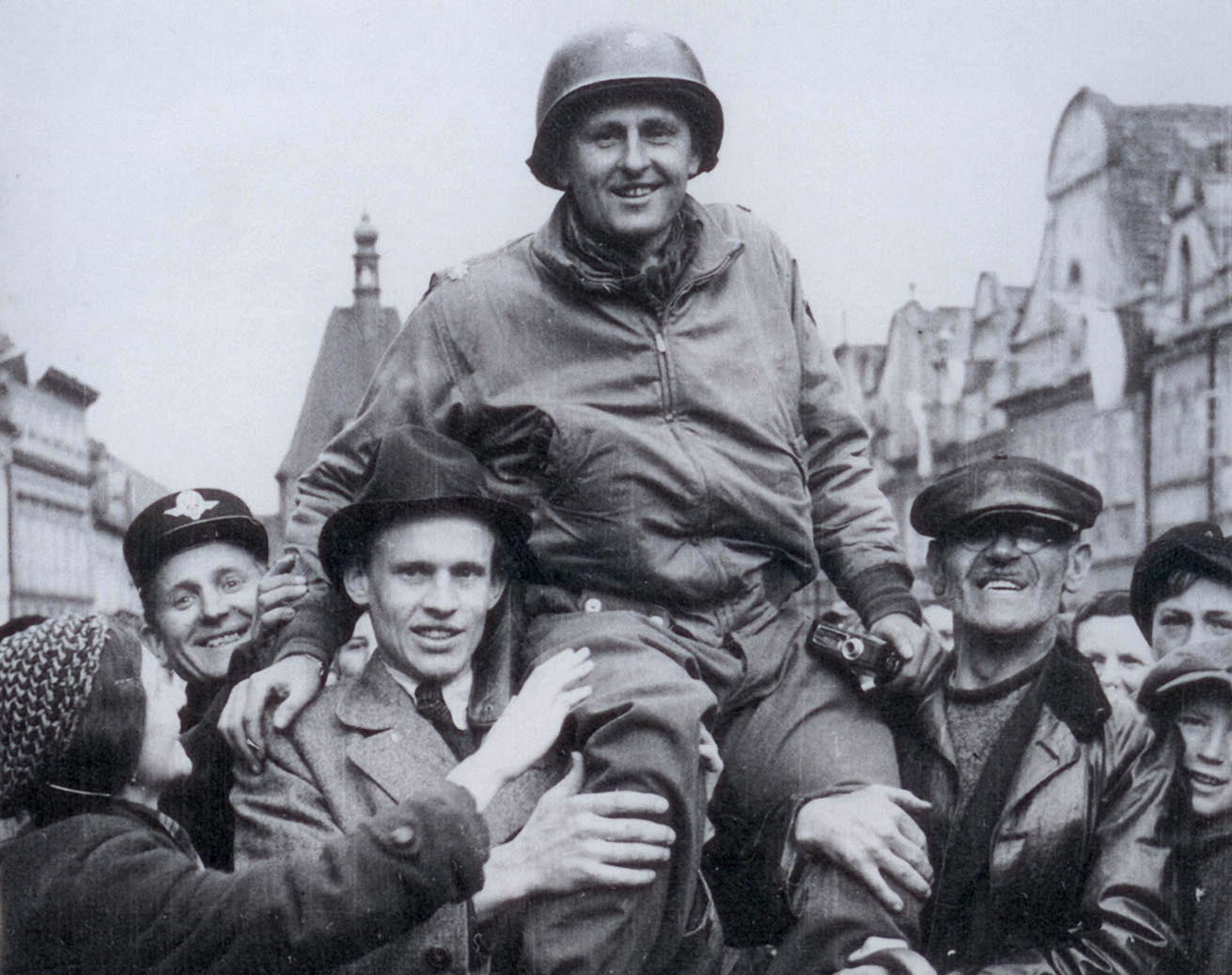
Col. Matt Konop hoisted by the people of Domažlice, May 1945. The Czech people were amazed the Americans who liberated the town were led by the descendant of immigrants from the area.

Domažlice was officially liberated the next day, on May 5. Celebrations like the raucous one in Domažlice's main square occurred throughout the areas of Czechoslovakia liberated by the Americans over those early days in May, with Czech and American flags hoisted together, and citizens donning their native costumes to greet troops.

On May 6, the division established its command post at its final destination of the war, the Czech city of Plzeň. The city was secured and the 2nd Infantry Division was positioned in the center of town. On May 7, General Robertson hosted a party at the division's headquarters, inviting representatives of the city, local artists, and other guests to celebrate with his staff. Since Konop could speak English and Czech, he acted as a Master of Ceremonies for the night, and at midnight announced at the event and over the town's loudspeakers that the war in Europe was over. A raucous celebration followed in the square.

== Home life and return to Czechoslovakia ==
After the war, in the fall of 1945, Konop rejoined his wife, Eunice, and their three children in Two Rivers, Wisconsin. He sold insurance and left active duty, remaining in the Army Reserves. The couple would have four more children after the war. Konop made two trips back to Czechoslovakia, in 1975 and 1979, while the Czechs were under Soviet totalitarian rule and part of the Eastern Bloc. The last trip he made by himself, where he spent several days in the Domažlice region, speaking in Czech with people about the American liberation in 1945.

== After the fall of the Berlin Wall ==
After the fall of the Berlin Wall and the Iron Curtain in 1989 and the arrival of post-Cold War Europe, the Museum of Domažlice published a pamphlet in 1990 to celebrate the country's newfound freedom, and the American Army's role in the liberation of the area in World War II. The cover of the pamphlet is one of the series of pictures of Col. Konop on the shoulders of the people of Domažlice that day in May 1945.

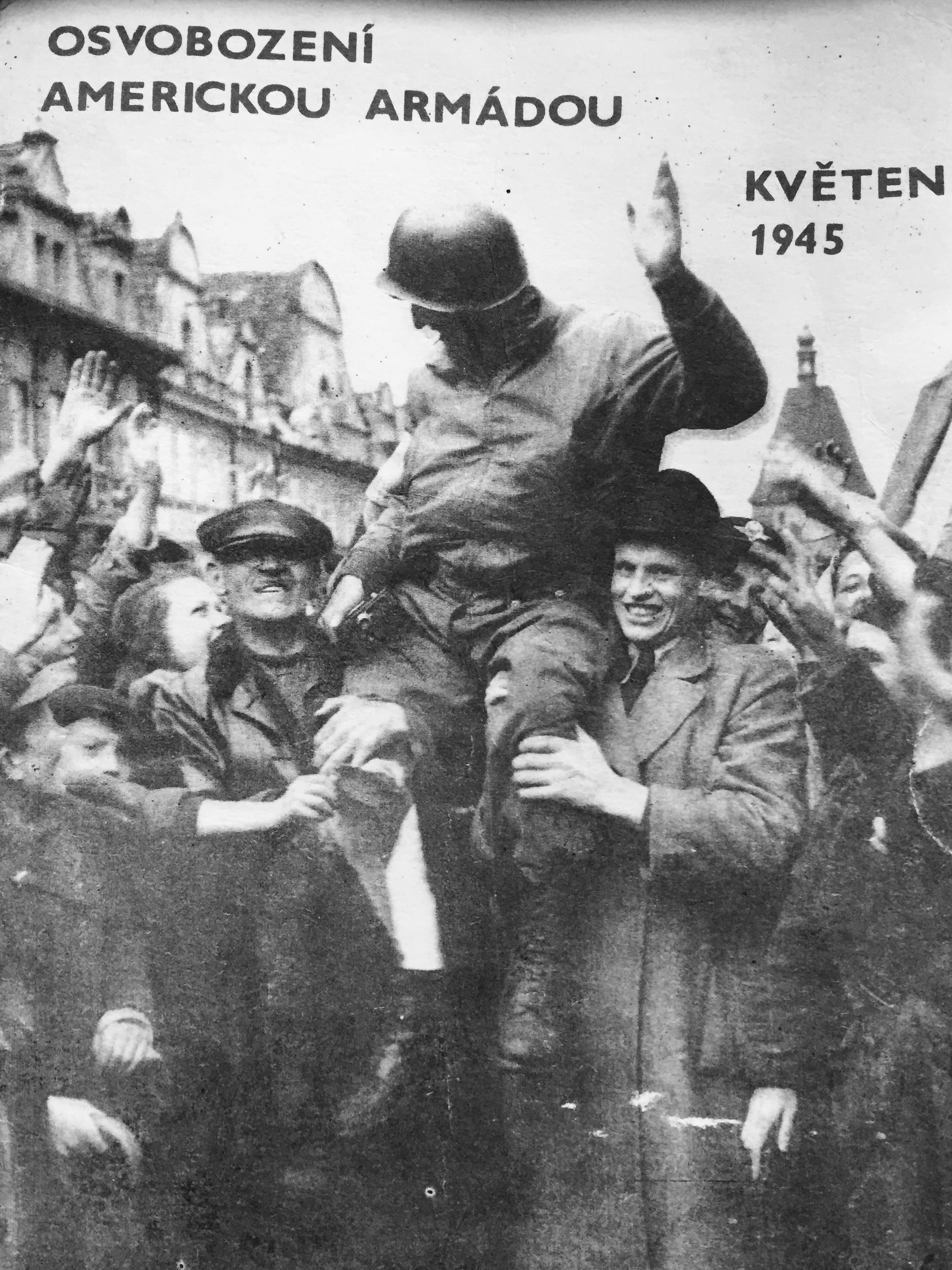
The cover of a Domažlice Museum pamphlet published in 1990 features Konop on the shoulders of the townspeople from the day the town was liberated in May 1945

== Revival and The Accidental Hero ==
Twenty years after his death, Konop's family discovered his typewritten pages about his time in the war, forgotten in a family member's basement with his personal effects. Konop's grandson, Patrick Dewane, turned his writings into a one-man play titled The Accidental Hero, and incorporated his grandfather's reels of World War II film footage, war souvenirs, and more into the show. In the play, Dewane plays more than a dozen characters, including Konop and himself, sharing the extraordinary string of coincidences in Konop's war time service, and the astonishment the people of Czechoslovakia felt, and still feel, about the Czech-speaking American hero who returned to his homeland to help free them from the Nazis.

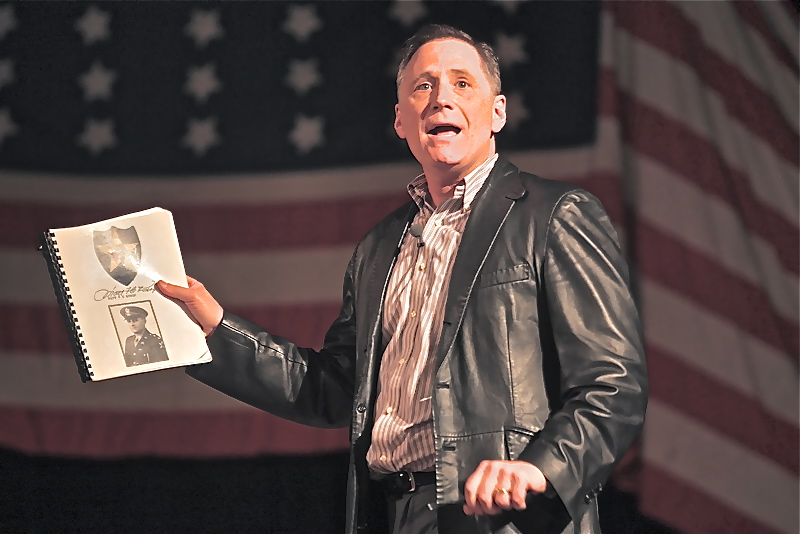
Patrick Dewane, grandson of Matt Konop, performs The Accidental Hero

Since 2010, The Accidental Hero has been performed in more than 100 theaters and locations across the United States, including the New York Czech Center, The National WWII Museum in New Orleans, the George H.W. Bush Museum & Library in College Station, TX, the Marcus Center for the Performing Arts in Milwaukee, the University of Notre Dame, and Minneapolis, MN. Since 2012, Dewane has made annual visits to the Czech Republic in the first week of May, performing the play with Czech subtitles throughout the country, including in Prague, Plzeň, Domažlice, Klatovy and Klenčí pod Čerchovem. Performances in Plzeň, Domažlice, and Klatovy have coincided with those cities' annual traditions of celebrating the American Army's liberation of the area, events that include townspeople driving American World War II vehicles and dressing in period Army uniforms.

== Bronze plaque dedication ==
On May 5, 2015, a bronze relief plaque reproducing the photo of Konop on the shoulders of the townspeople was installed on the outside of the Hruska building in the main square in Domažlice, and dedicated to Matt Konop's role in bringing freedom to the area. The plaque's text is in both Czech and English. In Konop's left hand is his Kodak movie camera.

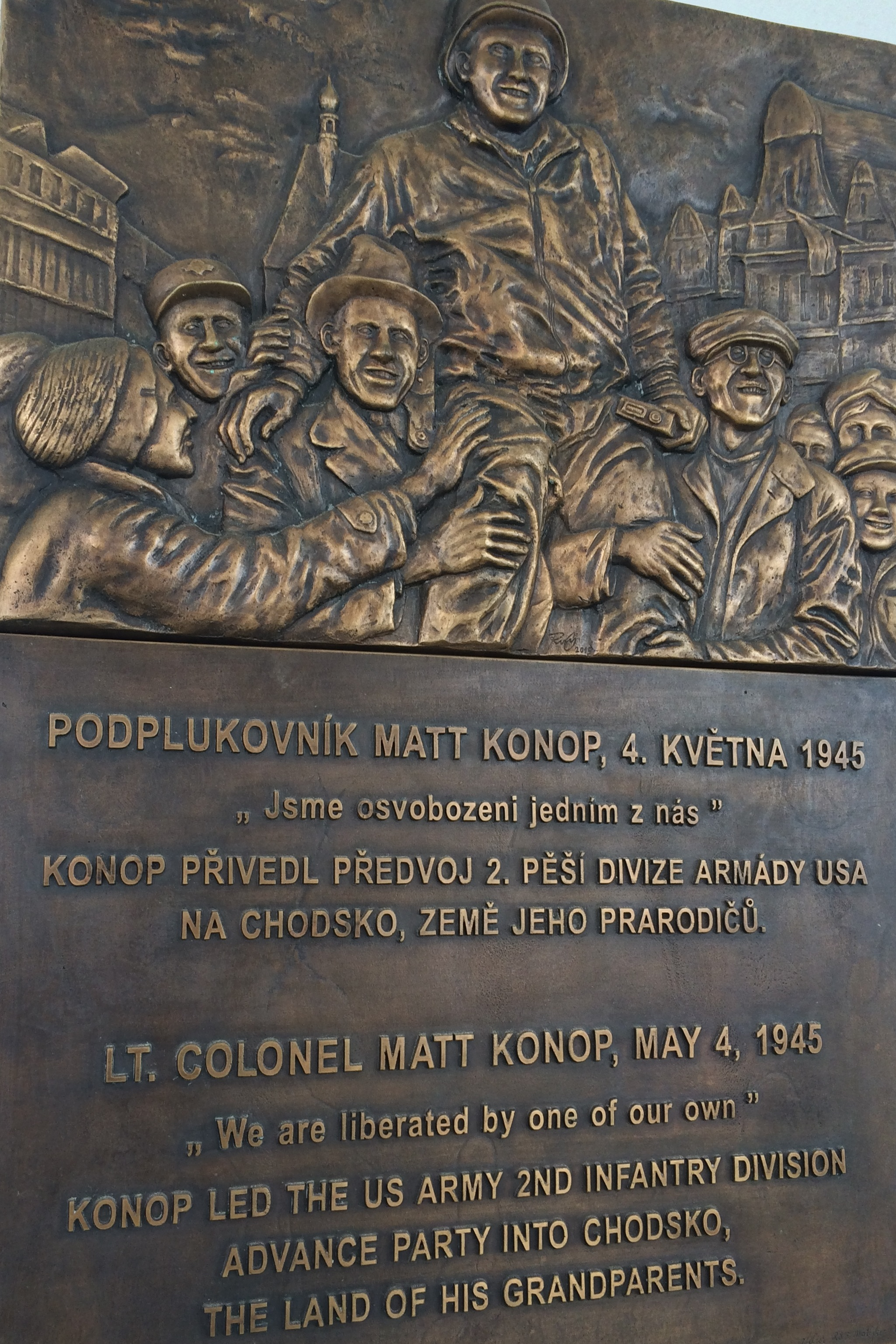
Bronze plaque celebrating Col. Konop's role in the liberation of Czechoslovakia in WWII. Hruska Bldg, Domažlice.
