= America (shipwreck) =

Wooden schooner wrecked in Lake Michigan

- America (Shipwreck)
- U.S. National Register of Historic Places
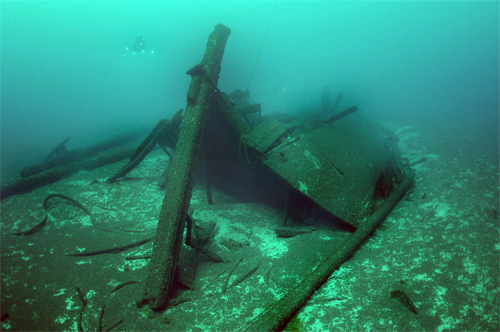
- Location: Lake Michigan, off Carlton, Wisconsin
- NRHP reference No.: 13000467
- Added to NRHP: July 3, 2013

America was a wooden schooner. Its wreck site lies in Lake Michigan off Carlton, Wisconsin.

== Service history ==
America was completed in Port Huron, Michigan in 1873. Primarily, the ship sailed on the lower areas of Lake Michigan. Her main cargo consisted of lumber and ice.

== Sinking ==
On September 28, 1880, America was en route to Escanaba, Michigan from Chicago, Illinois, to pick up a load of iron ore for delivery to Michigan City, Indiana. That night, America struck another vessel's scow line, causing catastrophic damage to America′s bow. America sank quickly. A little over a week later, efforts to salvage America ended unsuccessfully and the wreck was abandoned.

The wreck was found in 1977. Its wheel is on display at the Wisconsin Maritime Museum in Manitowoc, Wisconsin, and its anchor is on display at the Rogers Street Fishing Village in Two Rivers, Wisconsin.
