= Herman Schlundt =

American chemist (1869–1937)

Herman Schlundt (19 July 1869 in Two Rivers, Wisconsin – 1937) was a physical chemist from the United States. He is most well known for extracting and refining radioactive metals from low-grade ore and industrial waste during his time as a researcher, which have had modern implications. Two buildings were named in his honor on the University of Missouri campus in Columbia, Missouri.

== Biography ==
He graduated from the University of Wisconsin in 1894 and took his Ph.D. at the University of Leipzig in 1901. He was for a time connected with the faculty at the University of Wisconsin, and from 1902 was associated with that of the University of Missouri in Columbia, Missouri, where he was professor of physical chemistry in 1907–13, and chairman of the department of chemistry in 1910–15.

After 1924, he and William McGavock fabricated a laboratory for the refining of mesothorium (from monazite ore) and radium (from discarded watch dials). It was a unique source of thorium and was resorted to by many noted scientists, for example Marie Curie. The lab received national press notice in 1930 and shortly thereafter closed.

== Legacy ==
Despite being dead for over 80 years, the activities undertaken as a researcher have had ongoing environmental impact. Pickard Hall on the University of Missouri campus was found to be contaminated with radiation (where Schlundt conducted his work in the early 20th century). The problem first rose to awareness in the 1970s, and the building was eventually closed to the public in 2013 in an attempt to clean the building. The hall was ultimately scheduled to be demolished in 2019 after no method to clear the radioactivity could be found.
