= Ewald J. Schmeichel =

American politician (1889–1975)

Ewald J. Schmeichel was a member of the Wisconsin State Assembly.

== Biography ==
Schmeichel was born on December 22, 1889, in Two Rivers, Wisconsin. He studied in the University of Wisconsin-Oshkosh, University of Wisconsin-Stout and University of Wisconsin-Madison. Schmeichel died in 1975.

== Career ==
Schmeichel was a member of the Assembly from 1957 to 1960. He was a Republican.
