= Point Beach Ridges =

State Natural Area in Manitowoc County, Wisconsin

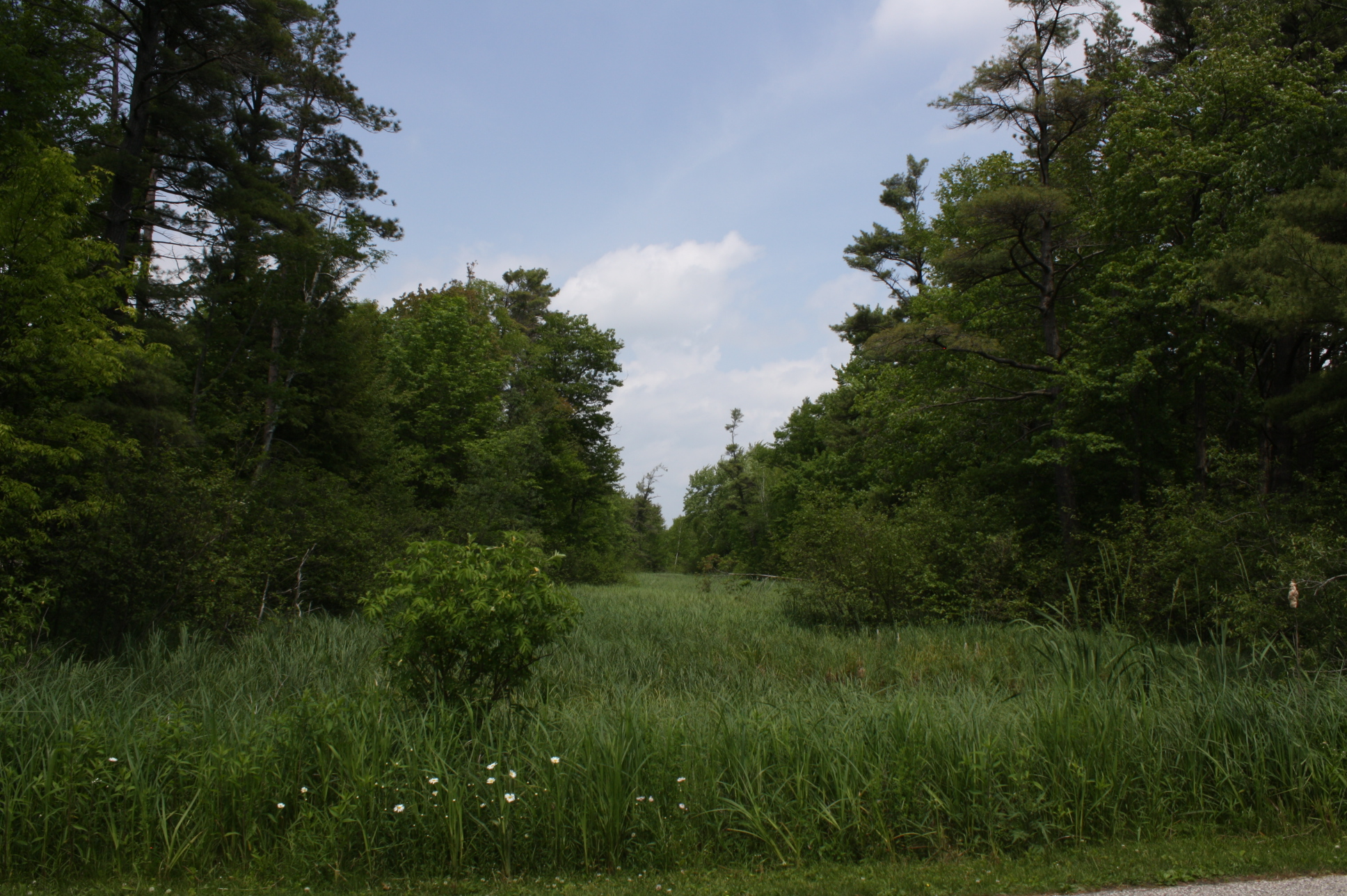
- A swale surrounded by ridges at Point Beach State Park

- Location within Wisconsin
- Location: Manitowoc County, Wisconsin, Wisconsin
- Coordinates: 44°12′49″N 87°30′55″W
- Area: 558 acres (226 ha)

U.S. National Natural Landmark
- Designated: 1980

Point Beach Ridges is a 558-acre (226 ha) topography of alternating ridges and swales in Manitowoc County, Wisconsin. The area is located within Point Beach State Forest. It was designated a Wisconsin State Natural Area in 1971 and a National Natural Landmark in 1980.
