= Point Beach State Forest =

State forest in Manitowoc County, Wisconsin

- Sand dunes at Point Beach State Forest

- Location within Wisconsin Location within the United States
- Interactive map of Point Beach State Forest
- Location: Manitowoc County, Wisconsin, United States
- Coordinates: 44°12′08″N 87°31′07″W
- Area: 2,903 acres (1,175 ha)
- Established: 1938
- Administrator: Wisconsin Department of Natural Resources
- Website: Official website
- Wisconsin State Forests

Point Beach State Forest is a 2,903-acre (1,175 ha) Wisconsin state forest near Two Rivers, Wisconsin in Manitowoc County. The forest is located along 6 miles (9.7 km) of the Lake Michigan coast and offers beach access, camping, hiking, and biking trails. Point Beach State Forest was established in 1938. The Point Beach Ridges, a National Natural Landmark, are located within the forest.

The Ice Age National Scenic Trail's 1,200 mile course around Michigan includes approximately eight miles in Point Beach State Forest. There are 11 miles of hiking trails bicycle trails in the State Forest, including the 5.2-mile Rawley Point Bicycle Trail.

A nature center at the park offers concessions including ice cream. The Rawley Point Lighthouse operated by the U.S. Coast Guard owns is next to the beach. It is not open to the public.
