= Rawley Point Light =

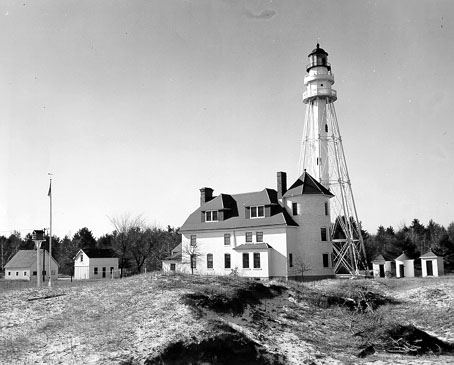
- Location: Near Two Rivers, Wisconsin
- Coordinates: 44°12′38.821″N 87°30′31.615″W

Tower
- Constructed: 1853, 1873
- Construction: brick (first tower); steel (second tower)
- Automated: 1979
- Height: 111 feet (34 m)
- Heritage: National Register of Historic Places listed place

Light
- First lit: 1874 (first tower); 1894 (second tower)
- Focal height: 113 feet (34 m)
- Lens: various; see text
- Range: 21 nautical miles (39 km; 24 mi)
- Characteristic: White, Flashing
- Rawley Point Light Station
- U.S. National Register of Historic Places
- Nearest city: Two Rivers, Wisconsin
- Area: 1.5 acres (0.61 ha)
- Built: 1894
- NRHP reference No.: 84003706
- Added to NRHP: July 19, 1984

Rawley Point Light (also known as Twin River Point Light) is a lighthouse located in Point Beach State Forest, near Two Rivers, Wisconsin. At 111 feet (34 m) tall, it is the tallest lighthouse on the Wisconsin Shore and it is listed on the National Register of Historic Places.

== History ==
Rawley Point is named after Peter Rowley, who established a trading post in the area in 1835. Some accounts say that a light was established here as early as 1853, a 75 feet (23 m) tall arrangement of four poles holding a lantern; this was succeeded by a wooden house and tower.

This structure proved ill-placed, and a more substantial building was erected beginning in 1873, consisting of a brick house with an attached tower, about 100 feet (30 m) tall, in which was mounted a third order Fresnel lens. This light went into service on December 7, 1874. In 1890 a steam fog whistle was added, and in 1893 a circular oil house was built.

The brick tower was not structurally sound, and in 1892 it was strengthened. This continued to be unsatisfactory, and in 1894 a plan was conceived to replace the existing tower with a skeletal tower taken from the old Chicago Harbor Light, which was erected in 1859 and dismantled when its replacement constructed. This tower had to be increased in height by adding two stages of trusswork to its base; a new service room was also inserted below the lantern. The new light received the lens from the old light and was first lit on November 20, 1894. The old tower remained standing until the next year, when it was dismantled down to the level of roof of the keeper's dwelling; at the same time, the latter was extended to encompass the stubby remains of the old tower.

The fog signal was upgraded to a diaphone in 1919; the following year the beacon was electrified. The Fresnel lens was damaged in 1952 and was replaced by twin DCB-36 Aerobeacons; a fire a decade later damaged the addition to the keepers dwelling and the old tower, but they were repaired. The station was automated in 1979, but it continued to be used as a residence for Coast Guard personnel. The beacon was changed again in 1987. The light continues in service, as does the dwelling.

The light station was placed on the National Register of Historic Places in 1975. Up until 1956, this light was referred to as the Twin River Point Light, but in that year it was given its present name.

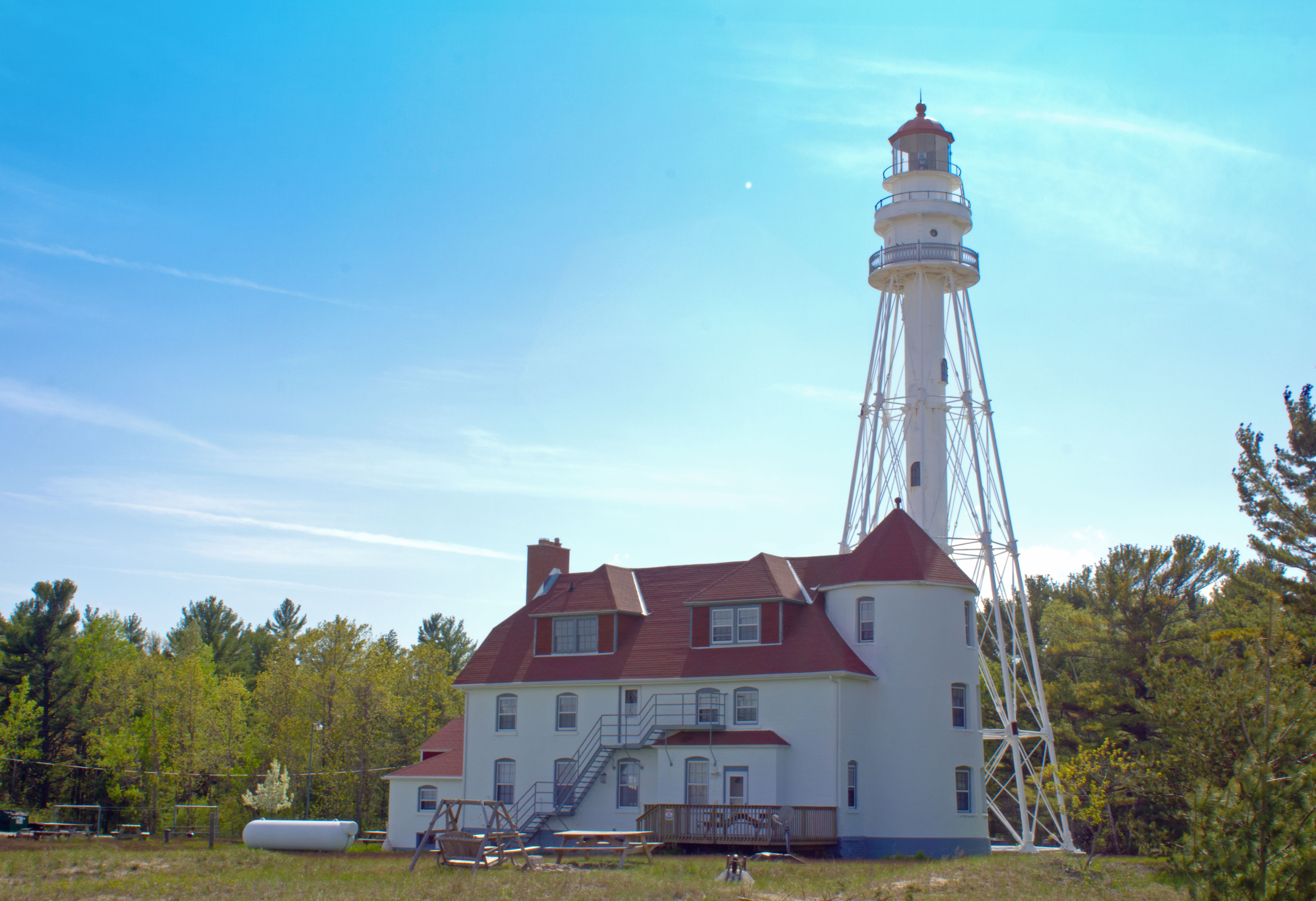
Eastern view of the lighthouse and keeper's house

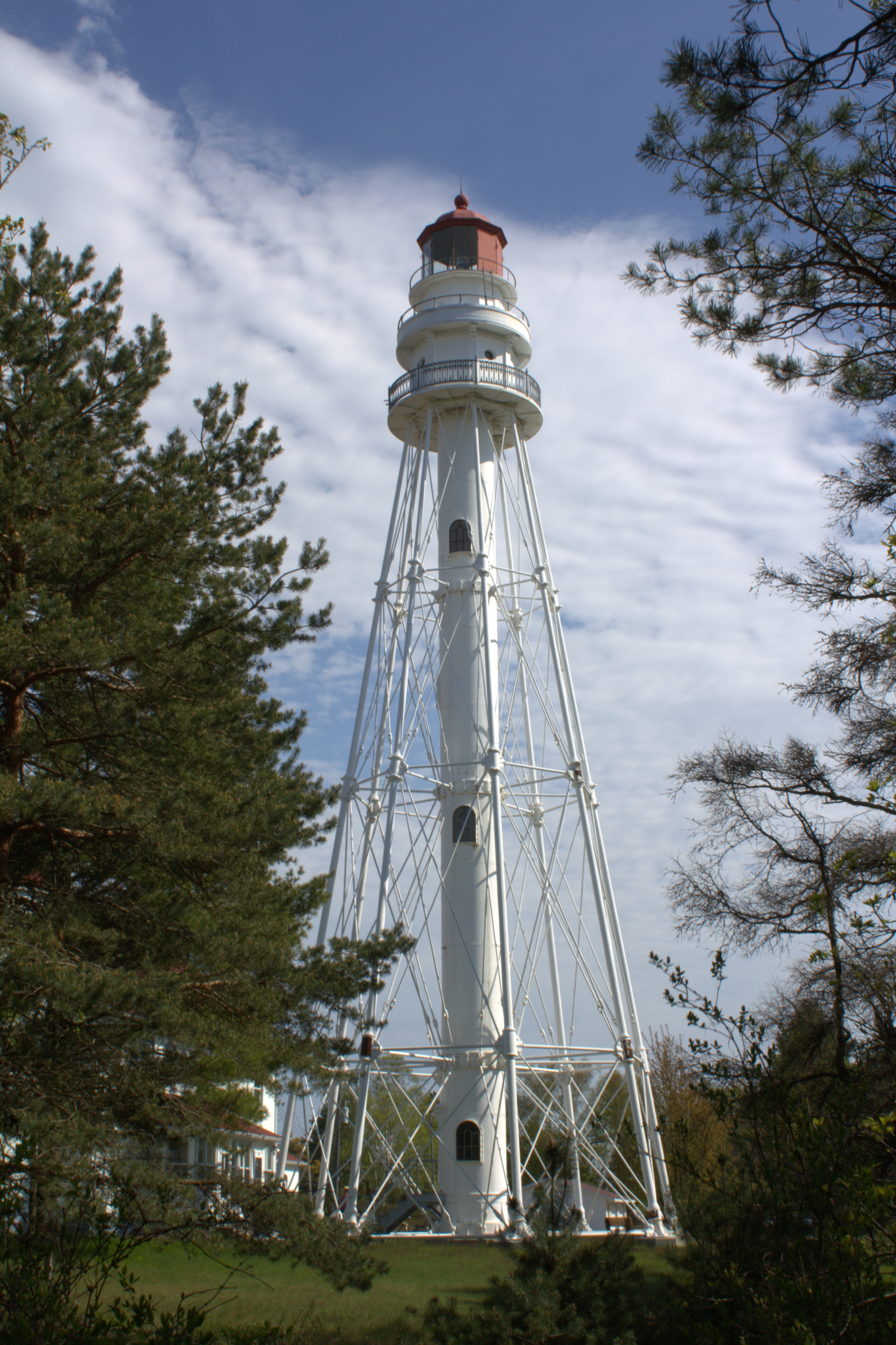
View from the north of Rawley Point Lighthouse
