= Two Rivers, Wisconsin =

- City
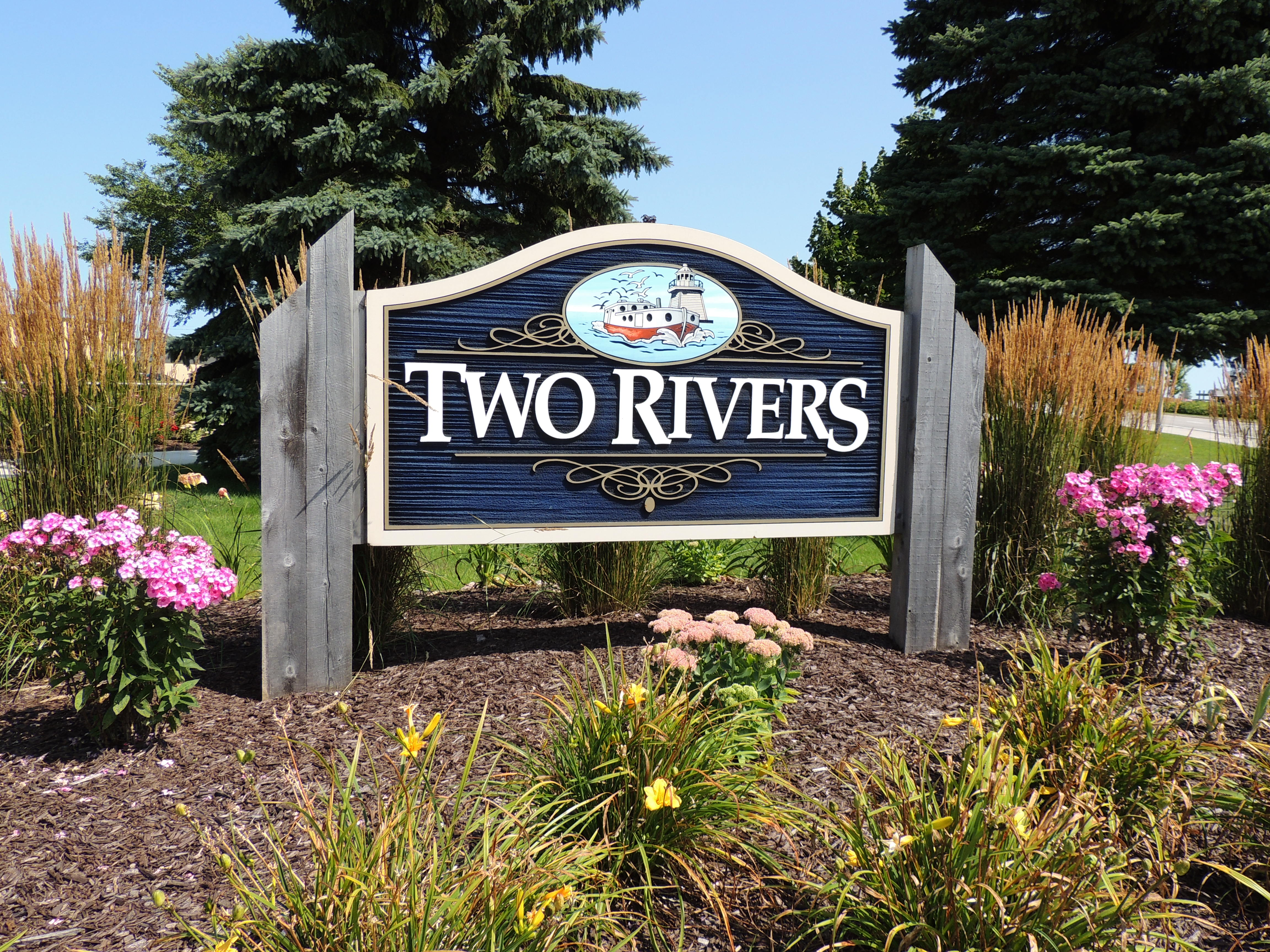
- Nickname: "The Coolest Spot in Wisconsin" "The Cool City" "TR" or "Trivers" "Carp Town"
- Motto: "Catch our friendly waves"
- Location of Two Rivers in Manitowoc County, Wisconsin

- Location within Wisconsin Location within the United States
- Coordinates: 44°9′18″N 87°34′35″W
- Country: United States
- State: Wisconsin
- County: Manitowoc

Area
  - Total: 6.49 sq mi (16.82 km^{2})
  - Land: 6.05 sq mi (15.66 km^{2})
  - Water: 0.45 sq mi (1.17 km^{2})

Population (2020)
  - Total: 11,271
  - Density: 1,826.6/sq mi (705.26/km^{2})
- Time zone: UTC−6 (Central (CST))
  - Summer (DST): UTC−5 (CDT)
- ZIP codes: 54241
- Area code: 920
- FIPS code: 55-81325
- Website: www.two-rivers.org

Two Rivers is a city in Manitowoc County, Wisconsin, United States. The population was 11,271 at the 2020 census. It claims to be the birthplace of the ice cream sundae (though other cities, such as Ithaca, New York, make the same claim). The city's advertising slogan is "Catch our friendly waves" as it is located along Lake Michigan.

== History ==
A post office called Two Rivers has been in operation since 1848. The city was named from its location at the confluence of the Mishicot and Neshota rivers, now known as the East Twin and West Twin Rivers, respectively.

== Geography ==
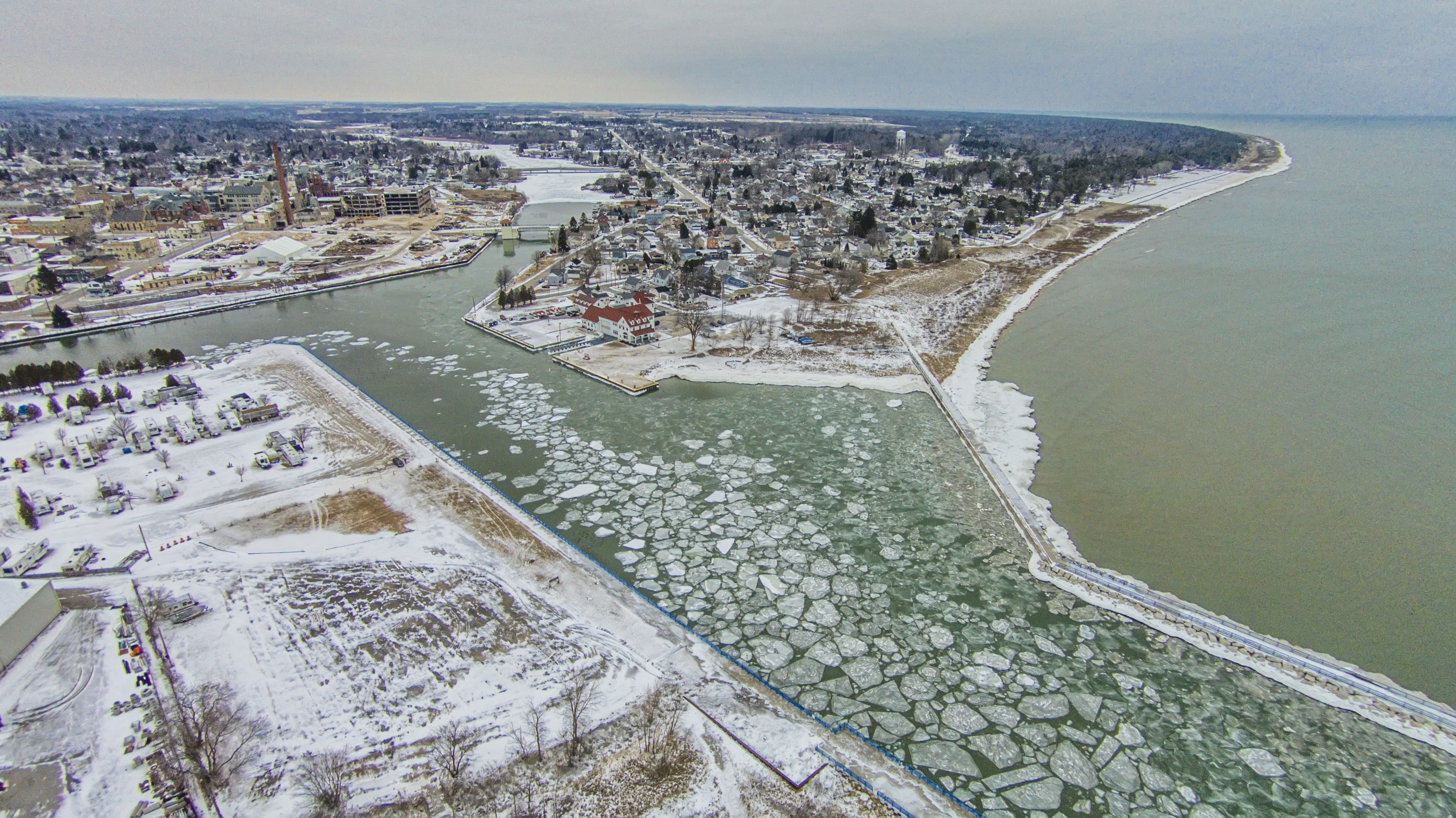
The East Twin and West Twin rivers meet at the Two Rivers harbor before journeying into Lake Michigan.

Two Rivers derives its name from the East Twin River and the West Twin River which meet in the city less than a mile from their outflows at Lake Michigan. Two Rivers is located at 44°9′17″N 87°34′35″W (44.154928, −87.57642).

According to the United States Census Bureau, the city has a total area of 6.49 square miles (16.81 km^{2}), of which, 6.09 square miles (15.77 km^{2}) is land and 0.40 square miles (1.04 km^{2}) is water.

=== Highways ===
- WIS 42 Northbound travels to Kewaunee and Sturgeon Bay. South it continues into Manitowoc.
- WIS 147 connects with Mishicot and Green Bay via I-43 northbound.
- WIS 310 connects with US 10 and I-43 towards Appleton westbound.

=== Climate ===
Two Rivers, Wisconsin lies within the humid continental climate zone, modified by its proximity to Lake Michigan. This gives the city more moderate temperatures and lesser extremes compared to its inland counterparts. The lake influence also gives Two Rivers a greater seasonal lag than places farther away from the lakeshore, with warmer Septembers and cooler Marches than the rest of the state; for instance, September, with a mean temperature of 60 °F (16 °C) is only one degree Fahrenheit cooler than June's 61 °F (16 °C), whereas Oshkosh, a few tens of miles inland at a similar latitude, experiences a September that is eight degrees Fahrenheit cooler than June.

The Köppen classification for the town is Dfb, often described as a cool summer humid continental climate, characterized by the coldest month's mean being below −3 °C (27 °F), the persistent snowpack line, and with four or more months above 10 °C (50 °F), but no month above 22 °C (72 °F).

Climate data for Two Rivers, Wisconsin (1991–2020 normals, extremes 1950–present)
Month	Jan	Feb	Mar	Apr	May	Jun	Jul	Aug	Sep	Oct	Nov	Dec	Year
Record high °F (°C)	53 (12)	60 (16)	77 (25)	84 (29)	91 (33)	97 (36)	99 (37)	97 (36)	96 (36)	86 (30)	76 (24)	62 (17)	99 (37)
Mean daily maximum °F (°C)	27.3 (−2.6)	29.8 (−1.2)	38.2 (3.4)	48.5 (9.2)	58.8 (14.9)	69.1 (20.6)	75.6 (24.2)	75.8 (24.3)	68.4 (20.2)	55.8 (13.2)	43.3 (6.3)	32.9 (0.5)	52.0 (11.1)
Daily mean °F (°C)	19.6 (−6.9)	21.8 (−5.7)	30.7 (−0.7)	41.3 (5.2)	51.2 (10.7)	61.2 (16.2)	67.5 (19.7)	67.8 (19.9)	60.4 (15.8)	48.4 (9.1)	36.3 (2.4)	25.9 (−3.4)	44.3 (6.8)
Mean daily minimum °F (°C)	12.0 (−11.1)	13.8 (−10.1)	23.2 (−4.9)	34.0 (1.1)	43.5 (6.4)	53.3 (11.8)	59.4 (15.2)	59.9 (15.5)	52.3 (11.3)	40.9 (4.9)	29.2 (−1.6)	19.0 (−7.2)	36.7 (2.6)
Record low °F (°C)	−28 (−33)	−26 (−32)	−17 (−27)	9 (−13)	24 (−4)	35 (2)	39 (4)	42 (6)	29 (−2)	19 (−7)	−8 (−22)	−21 (−29)	−28 (−33)
Average precipitation inches (mm)	1.78 (45)	1.45 (37)	2.04 (52)	3.40 (86)	3.43 (87)	4.15 (105)	3.34 (85)	3.23 (82)	2.52 (64)	2.77 (70)	2.12 (54)	1.80 (46)	32.03 (814)
Average snowfall inches (cm)	14.8 (38)	11.3 (29)	5.7 (14)	1.9 (4.8)	0.0 (0.0)	0.0 (0.0)	0.0 (0.0)	0.0 (0.0)	0.0 (0.0)	0.2 (0.51)	2.2 (5.6)	10.0 (25)	46.1 (117)
Average precipitation days (≥ 0.01 in)	9.5	7.9	8.7	11.0	11.6	11.1	10.6	9.6	9.7	10.7	9.4	8.5	118.3
Average snowy days (≥ 0.1 in)	5.9	4.9	2.4	0.9	0.0	0.0	0.0	0.0	0.0	0.1	1.2	4.2	19.6
Source: NOAA

== Demographics ==
Historical population
Census	Pop.	Note	%±
1860	1,337		—
1870	1,365		2.1%
1880	2,052		50.3%
1890	2,870		39.9%
1900	3,784		31.8%
1910	4,850		28.2%
1920	7,305		50.6%
1930	10,083		38.0%
1940	10,302		2.2%
1950	10,243		−0.6%
1960	12,393		21.0%
1970	13,732		10.8%
1980	13,354		−2.8%
1990	13,030		−2.4%
2000	12,639		−3.0%
2010	11,712		−7.3%
2020	11,271		−3.8%
U.S. Decennial Census

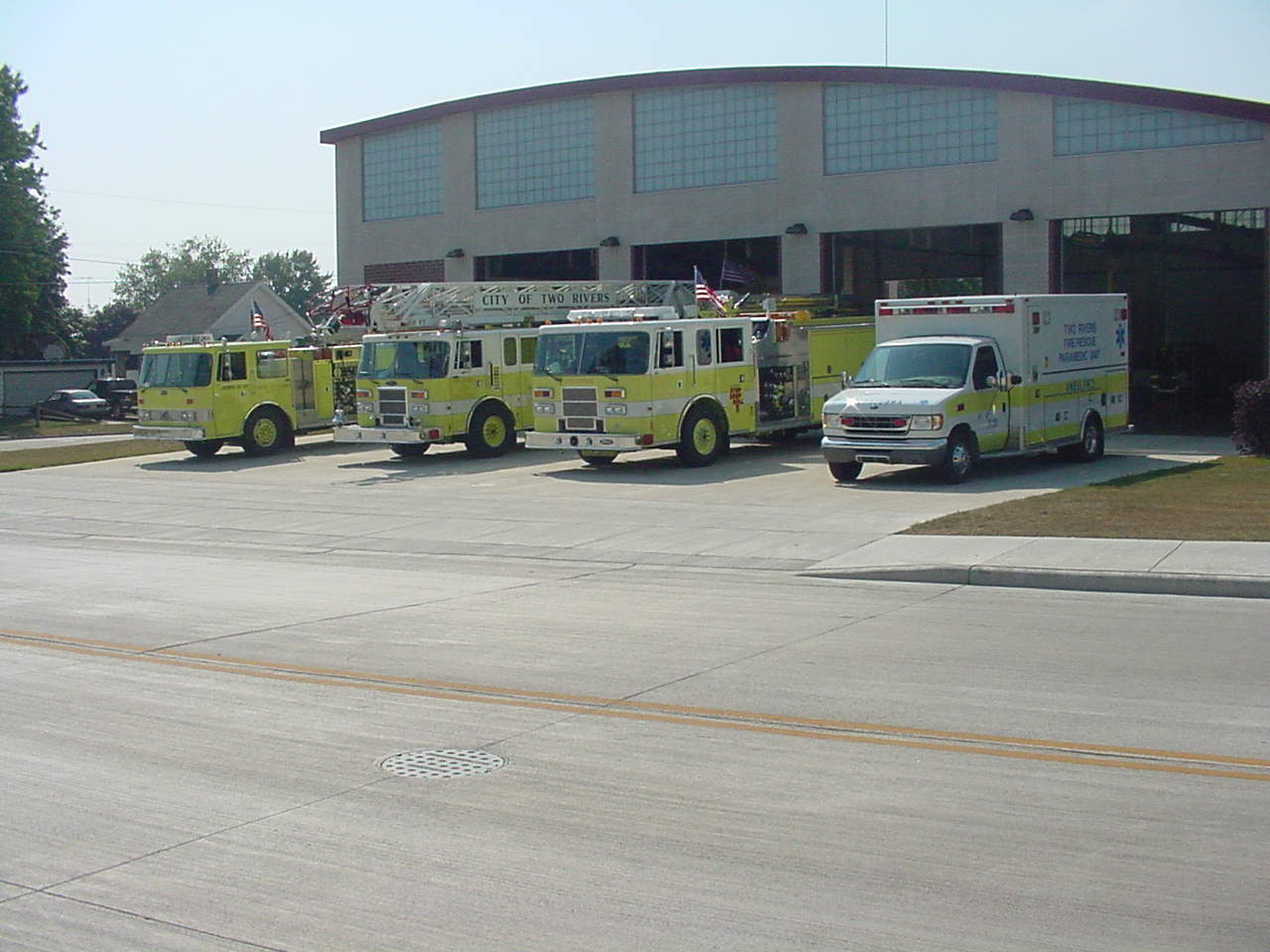
Two Rivers Fire Department

=== 2020 census ===
As of the 2020 census, Two Rivers had a population of 11,271. The median age was 46.2 years. 20.0% of residents were under the age of 18 and 22.4% were 65 years of age or older. For every 100 females, there were 96.1 males, and for every 100 females age 18 and over, there were 94.3 males.

99.8% of residents lived in urban areas, while 0.2% lived in rural areas.

There were 5,119 households in Two Rivers, of which 22.6% had children under the age of 18 living in them. Of all households, 42.4% were married-couple households, 21.4% were households with a male householder and no spouse or partner present, and 28.1% were households with a female householder and no spouse or partner present. About 36.0% of all households were made up of individuals and 16.6% had someone living alone who was 65 years of age or older.

There were 5,638 housing units, of which 9.2% were vacant. The homeowner vacancy rate was 1.6% and the rental vacancy rate was 8.1%.

Racial composition as of the 2020 census
Race	Number	Percent
White	9,980	88.5%
Black or African American	156	1.4%
American Indian and Alaska Native	78	0.7%
Asian	304	2.7%
Native Hawaiian and Other Pacific Islander	3	0.0%
Some other race	133	1.2%
Two or more races	617	5.5%
Hispanic or Latino (of any race)	415	3.7%

=== 2010 census ===
As of the census of 2010, there were 11,712 people, 5,119 households, and 3,156 families living in the city. The population density was 1,923.2 inhabitants per square mile (742.6/km^{2}). There were 5,698 housing units at an average density of 935.6 per square mile (361.2/km^{2}). The racial makeup of the city was 79.5% White, 8.5% African American, 3.8% Native American, 5.4% Asian, 1.7% from other races, and 7.2% from two or more races. Hispanic or Latino people of any race were 7.9% of the population.

There were 5,119 households, of which 26.9% had children under the age of 18 living with them, 48.4% were married couples living together, 9.2% had a female householder with no husband present, 4.1% had a male householder with no wife present, and 38.3% were non-families. 33.1% of all households were made up of individuals, and 15.2% had someone living alone who was 65 years of age or older. The average household size was 2.27 and the average family size was 2.86.

The median age in the city was 43.4 years. 21.6% of residents were under the age of 18; 7.4% were between the ages of 18 and 24; 23% were from 25 to 44; 29.3% were from 45 to 64; and 18.6% were 65 years of age or older. The gender makeup of the city was 48.9% male and 51.1% female.

=== 2000 census ===
According to the census of 2000, there were 12,639 people, 5,221 households, and 3,414 families living in the city. The population density was 2,230.1 people per square mile (860.7/km^{2}). There were 5,547 housing units at an average density of 978.7 per square mile (377.7/km^{2}). The racial makeup of the city was 95.74% White, 0.16% Black or African American, 0.44% Native American, 2.22% Asian, 0.06% Pacific Islander, 0.55% from other races, and 0.84% from two or more races. 1.35% of the population were Hispanic or Latino of any race.

There were 5,221 households, out of which 30.7% had children under the age of 18 living with them, 52.8% were married couples living together, 8.9% had a female householder with no husband present, and 34.6% were non-families. 29.4% of all households were made up of individuals, and 14.1% had someone living alone who was 65 years of age or older. The average household size was 2.40 and the average family size was 2.98.

In the city, the age distribution of the population shows 25.6% under the age of 18, 7.8% from 18 to 24, 27.4% from 25 to 44, 22.4% from 45 to 64, and 16.8% who were 65 years of age or older. The median age was 38 years. For every 100 females, there were 96.7 males. For every 100 females age 18 and over, there were 92.0 males.

The median income for a household in the city was $39,701, and the median income for a family was $48,241. Males had a median income of $35,378 versus $23,605 for females. The per capita income for the city was $18,908. About 4.2% of families and 6.3% of the population were below the poverty line, including 7.2% of those under age 18 and 5.9% of those age 65 or over.

== Government ==
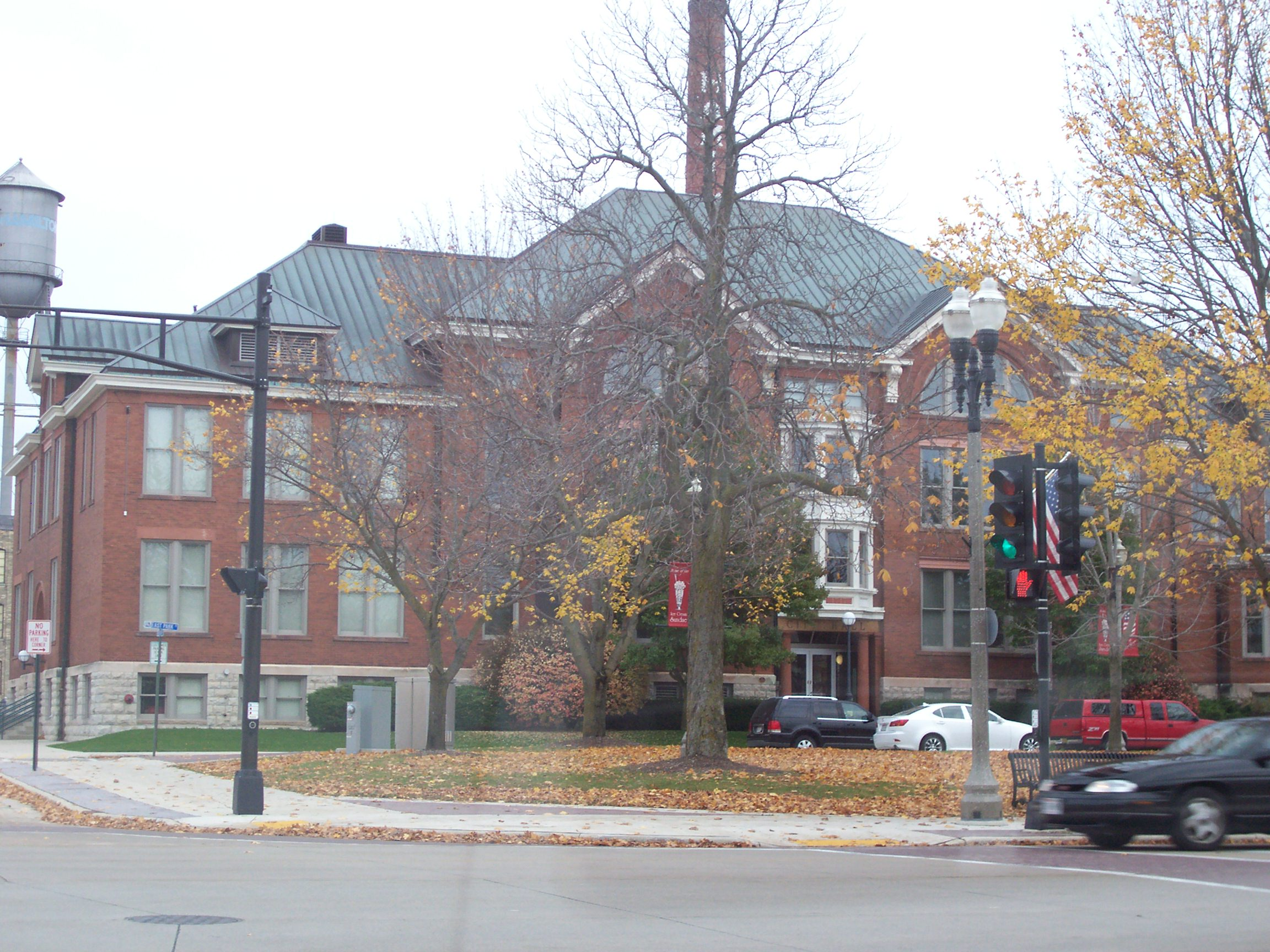
City hall

The city has a city manager–council form of government. Currently the position is being filled by police chief Ben Meinnert on an acting basis, as the previous appointee, Kyle Kordell, resigned on November 2, 2026 due to personal issues after a previous leave of absence. Kordell replaced Greg Buckley, who had held the position from August 1995 through August 2025.

== Education ==
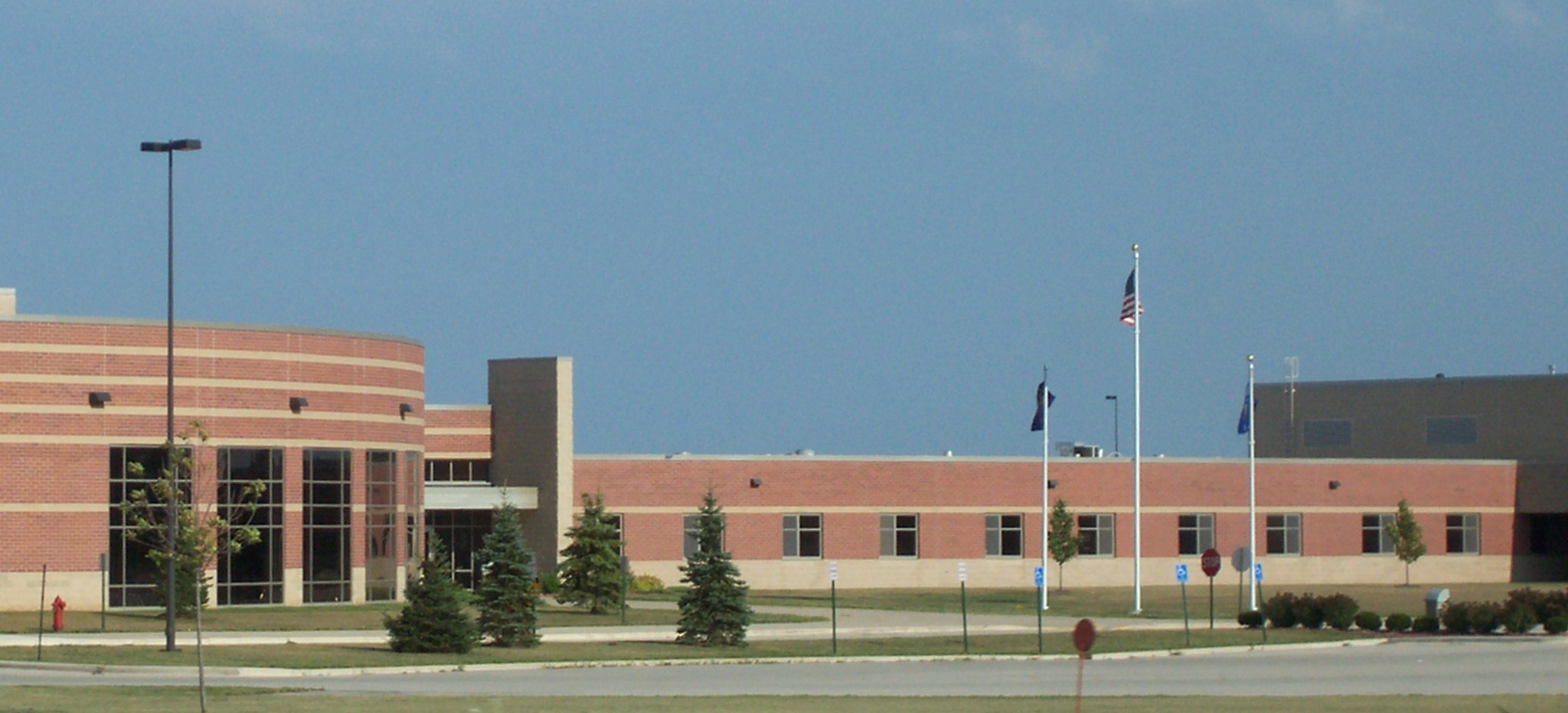
Two Rivers High School

Two Rivers has two public elementary schools, Koenig and Magee, and one parochial school: St. John's Lutheran (WELS). St. Peter the Fisherman Catholic grade school closed after the 2013–2014 school year.

The city's middle school, L. B. Clarke, serves students in fifth through eighth grade. The school was named for Charlton Heston's father-in-law, who helped fund the school; both Heston and his wife Lydia have visited the school.

Two Rivers is served by Two Rivers High School, built in 2002 to replace the now-demolished Washington High School. The school houses a photography darkroom and a television broadcast room for hands-on experience. The high school's daily announcements are broadcast by students on the city's public access television channel. The school's sports include swimming, football, track and field, baseball, soccer, and others. Some students from Two Rivers also attend Roncalli High School and Manitowoc Lutheran High School in nearby Manitowoc.

== Media ==
=== Newspapers ===
- Herald Times Reporter – daily newspaper owned by Gannett Newspapers
- Seehafer News – Manitowoc County's free local and state news, provided from WCUB through Seehafer Broadcasting Corporation and owned by Mark Seehafer

=== Television and radio ===
Two Rivers is part of the Green Bay, Wisconsin television market, as well as the Green Bay Nielsen radio market.

Seehafer Broadcasting owns all six commercial radio stations in Manitowoc County, with their studios based in Manitowoc, and WCUB and WOMT-FM licensed to Two Rivers. Spectrum provides local cable service.

== Ice cream sundae ==
There is some debate between Ithaca, New York and Two Rivers over which city has the right to claim the title "birthplace of the ice cream sundae." When Ithaca mayor Carolyn K. Peterson proclaimed a day to celebrate her city as the birthplace of the sundae, she received postcards from Two Rivers' citizens reiterating that town's claim. Ithaca retaliated with an ad called "Got Proof?" in the Two Rivers newspaper.

Two Rivers' claim is based on the story of George Hallauer asking Edward C. Berners, the owner of Berners' Soda Fountain, to drizzle chocolate syrup over ice cream in 1881. Berners eventually did, and wound up selling the treat for a nickel, originally only on Sundays, but later every day. According to this story, the spelling changed when a glass salesman ordered canoe-shaped dishes. When Berners died in 1939, the Chicago Tribune headlined his obituary "Man Who Made First Ice Cream Sundae Is Dead."

== Professional football ==
During the 1930s and 1940s, Two Rivers was home to training camps for numerous professional football teams. The city's cool weather, athletic facilities, and general hospitality of the town's people helped lure the teams. Washington High School, The J.E. Hamilton Community House, and Walsh Field were used for practices and meetings, while teams stayed at the Hamilton Hotel. The teams included the now defunct Columbus Bullies AFL in 1940 and the Chicago Rockets AAFC in 1947. Two Rivers also hosted the National Football League's Pittsburgh Pirates, now known as the Pittsburgh Steelers, in 1939 and the Philadelphia Eagles in 1941 and 1942.

== Points of interest ==
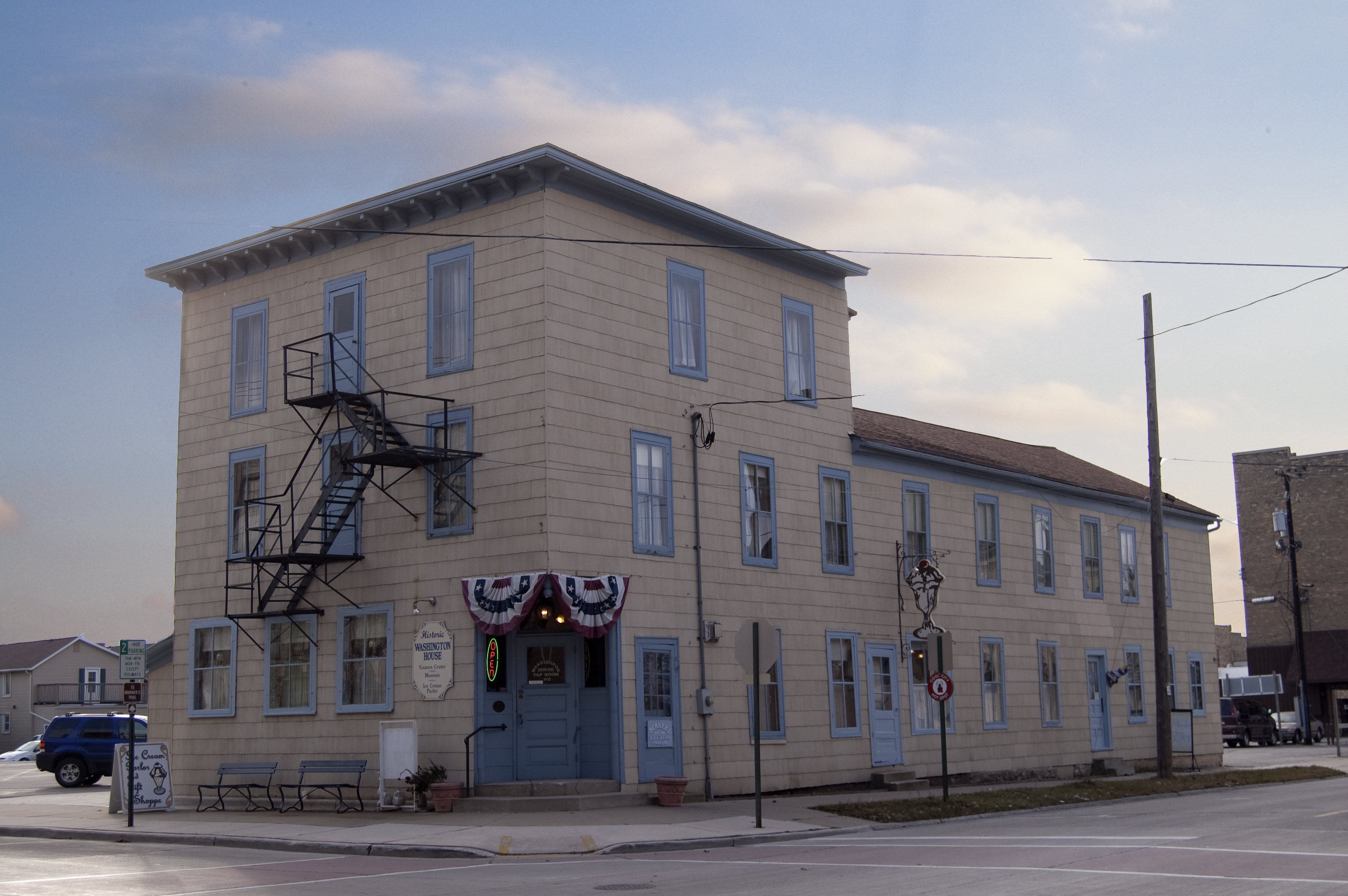
The Historic Washington House

The J.E. Hamilton Community House

Civil War Memorial Statue. City Hall and Hamilton Manufacturing in the background.

Civil War Memorial Statue plaque

- Lester Public Library provides book collections, programming, and access to the Internet.
- The Bernard Schwartz House, which was designed by Frank Lloyd Wright, is open to visitors as an overnight rental and has periodic public tours.
- The Historic Washington House is free and open to the public. The old inn and saloon is now an ice cream parlor and museum operated by volunteers. It provides historical information about the area. The top floor houses a ballroom with a mural-painted ceiling and a stage for live performances. The ballroom also functions as a used book store.
- The Hamilton Wood Type and Printing Museum is free and open to the public. It is the only museum dedicated to the preservation, study, production and printing of wood type. Housed in the factory that was once the nation's largest producer of wood type, the museum has a collection of over 1.5 million pieces in more than 1,000 styles.
- Point Beach State Forest and Park is accessible all year. Trails are available for hiking, biking, skiing, and enjoying the natural environment. Campgrounds are also available. Visitors can access some of Lake Michigan's beach fronts from the state park. The park is also home to the Rawley Point Light, which, at 111 feet, is the tallest lighthouse on the Great Lakes. The Point Beach Ridges, a topographical feature inside the park, were designated a Wisconsin State Natural Area in 1971 and a Natural National Landmark in 1980.
- Woodland Dunes Nature Center
- The Rogers Street Fishing Village is a maritime museum which includes the old Two Rivers Light, moved there from its original location at the end of one of the harbor breakwaters.
- Point Beach Nuclear Plant is located nine miles north of the city.
- The Rouse Simmons, a three masted schooner that was the basis for the musical The Christmas Schooner, sank off the coast of Two Rivers, near Rawley Point, in 1912. It was later discovered by a diver in 1971.
- Two Creeks Solar Park is located eight miles north of the city.
- The Wisconsin Shipwreck Coast National Marine Sanctuary, established in 2021 and the site of a large number of historically significant shipwrecks, lies in the waters of Lake Michigan off Two Rivers.

== Beaches ==
Two Rivers two popular beaches.

- Neshotah Beach is a sand beach on Lake Michigan with areas for swimming, volleyball, and launching jet skis and kayaks. Neshotah also has a softball field, volleyball and basketball courts, playgrounds, the Rawley Point bike trail, horseshoe pits, and picnic areas with tables and grills. The Beach House is home to a bathhouse/changing area, restrooms and a concession stand. Shelters in the park can be rented for private parties and picnics. There are two shelters in the park – at the beach and at the horseshoe pits. Neshotah Beach hosts one of the largest kite festivals in the Midwest: Kites Over Lake Michigan, held every Labor Day weekend.
- North Pier Beach is a newly formed beach by the U.S. Army Corps of Engineers, that pumped 67,000 cubic yards of sand from Lake Michigan to the shore.

== Notable people ==
- Edward P. Allis, co-founder of Allis-Chalmers Manufacturing Company
- Lester W. Bentley, artist and painter
- Lydia Clarke, actress and wife of Charlton Heston
- J.E. Hamilton, founder of Hamilton Manufacturing Company, the largest producer of wood type in the United States
- Matt Konop, lieutenant colonel in the United States Army during World War II; noted for his role in the liberation of Czechoslovakia
- Bryan Lee, blues guitarist
- Andrew Miller, Medal of Honor recipient
- Herman Schlundt, chemist
- Schmitt Brothers, international champion barbershop quartet

=== Athletes ===
- Ken Anderson, professional wrestler
- Chad Cascadden, NFL player
- Otto Stangel, basketball player
- Jordan Steckler, NFL player

=== Politicians ===
- J. Frank Aldrich, United States Representative from Illinois
- William Aldrich, United States Representative from Illinois
- Henry Baetz, State Treasurer of Wisconsin
- John Bohn, Mayor of Milwaukee, Wisconsin
- Everett E. Bolle, Wisconsin State Assembly
- Jonas Gagnon, Wisconsin State Assembly
- Charles Hartung, Mayor of Green Bay, Wisconsin
- Everett F. LaFond, Wisconsin State Senator
- Frank J. LeClair, Wisconsin State Assembly
- Alexander E. Martin, Wisconsin State Senator
- John J. Mertens, South Dakota State Senator
- William F. Nash, Wisconsin State Senator
- Frank E. Riley, Wisconsin State Assembly
- Ewald J. Schmeichel, Wisconsin State Assembly
- Jim Schmitt, Mayor of Green Bay, Wisconsin
- Thomas James Walsh, United States Senator from Montana and nominee for United States Attorney General

== Images ==
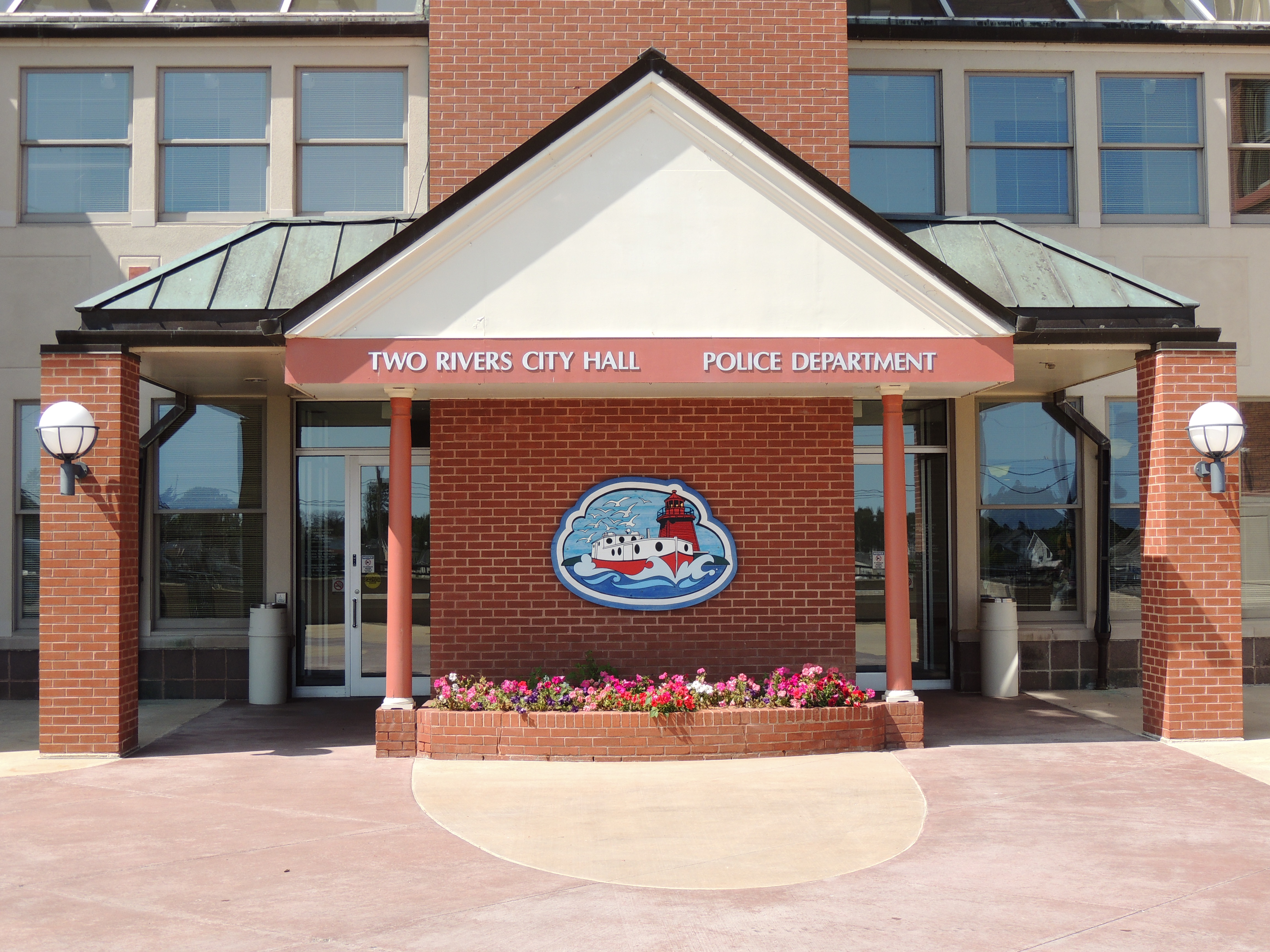
Two Rivers City Hall and Police Station

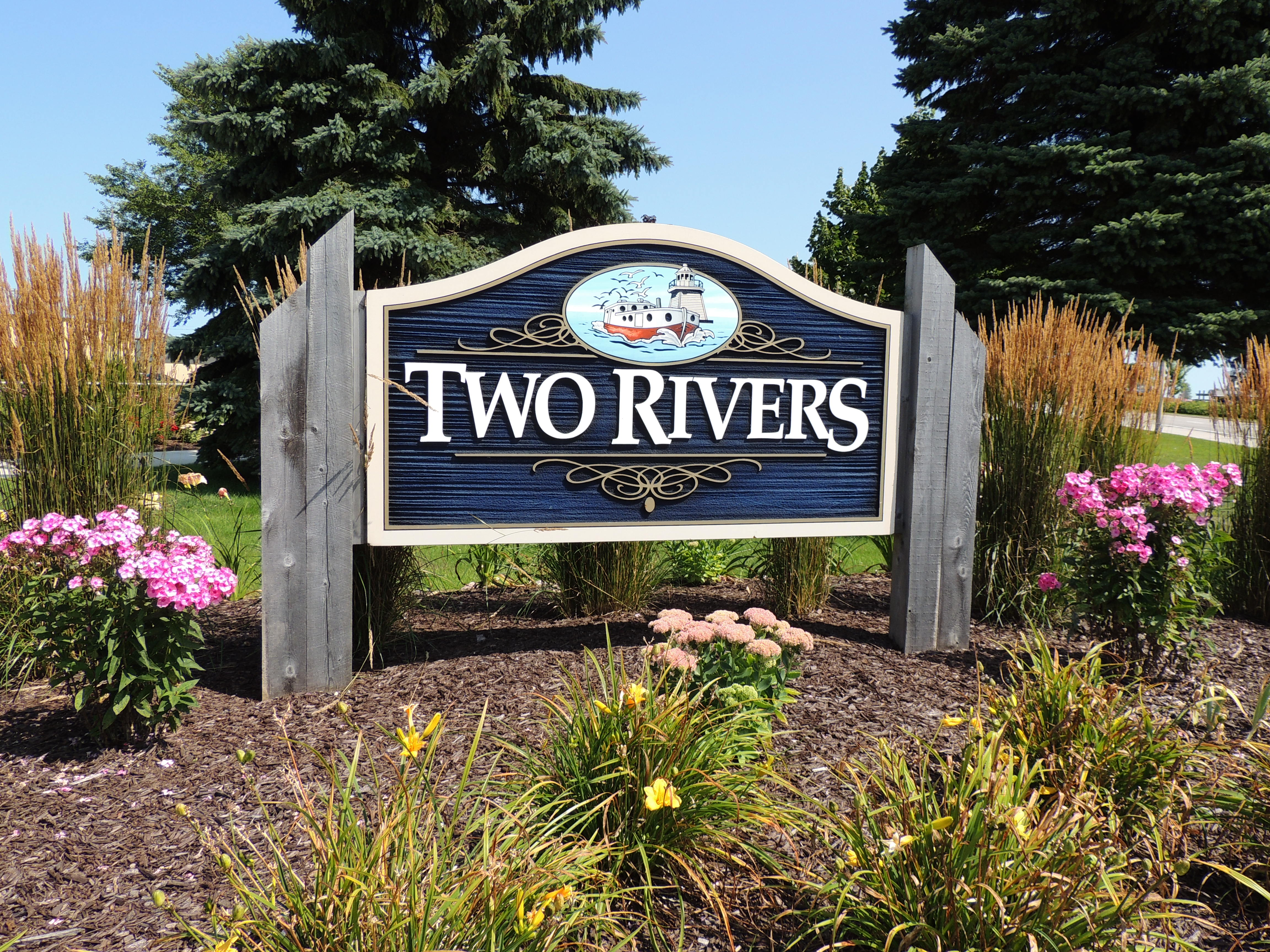
City of Two Rivers sign along Memorial Drive

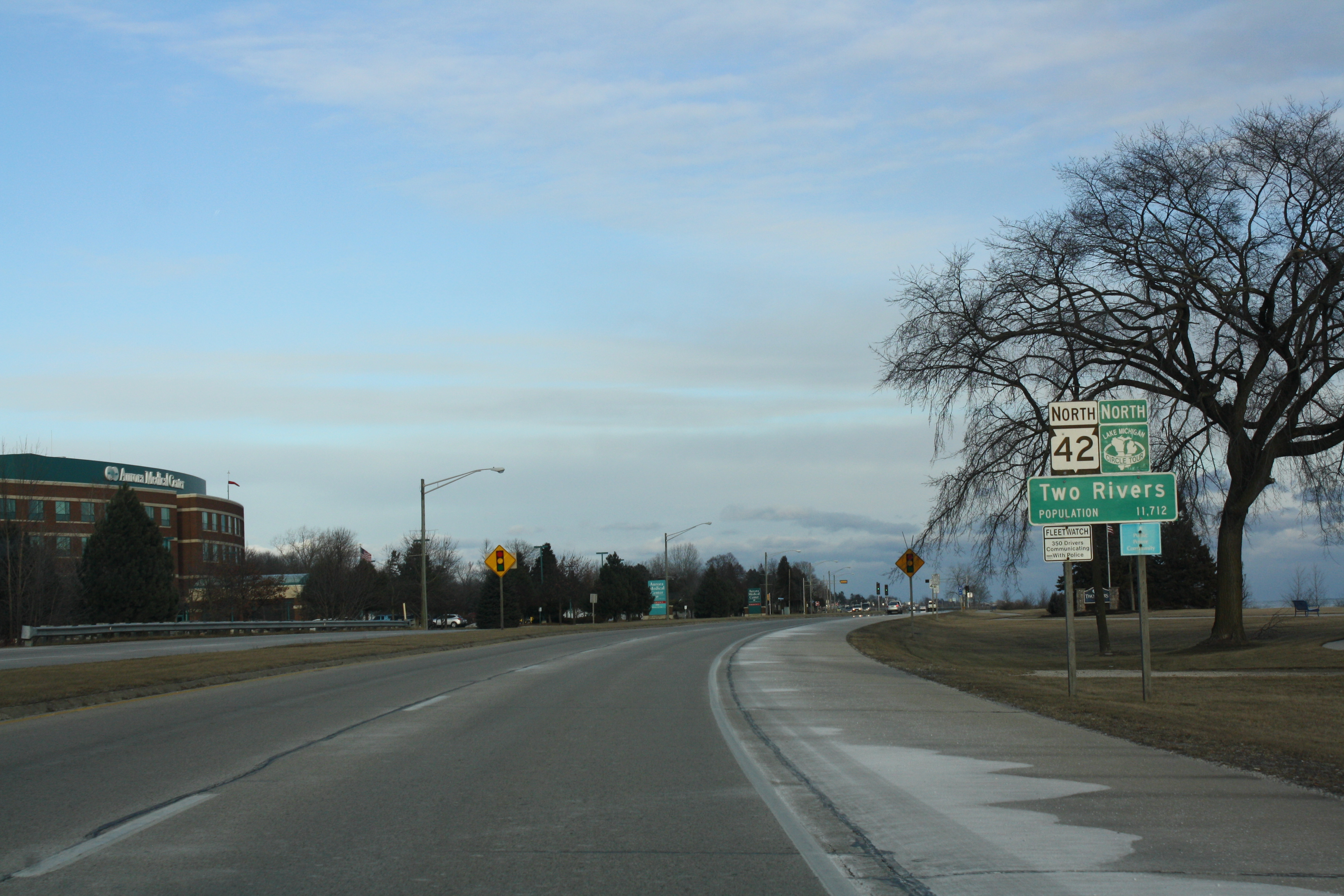
Two Rivers sign on WIS 42

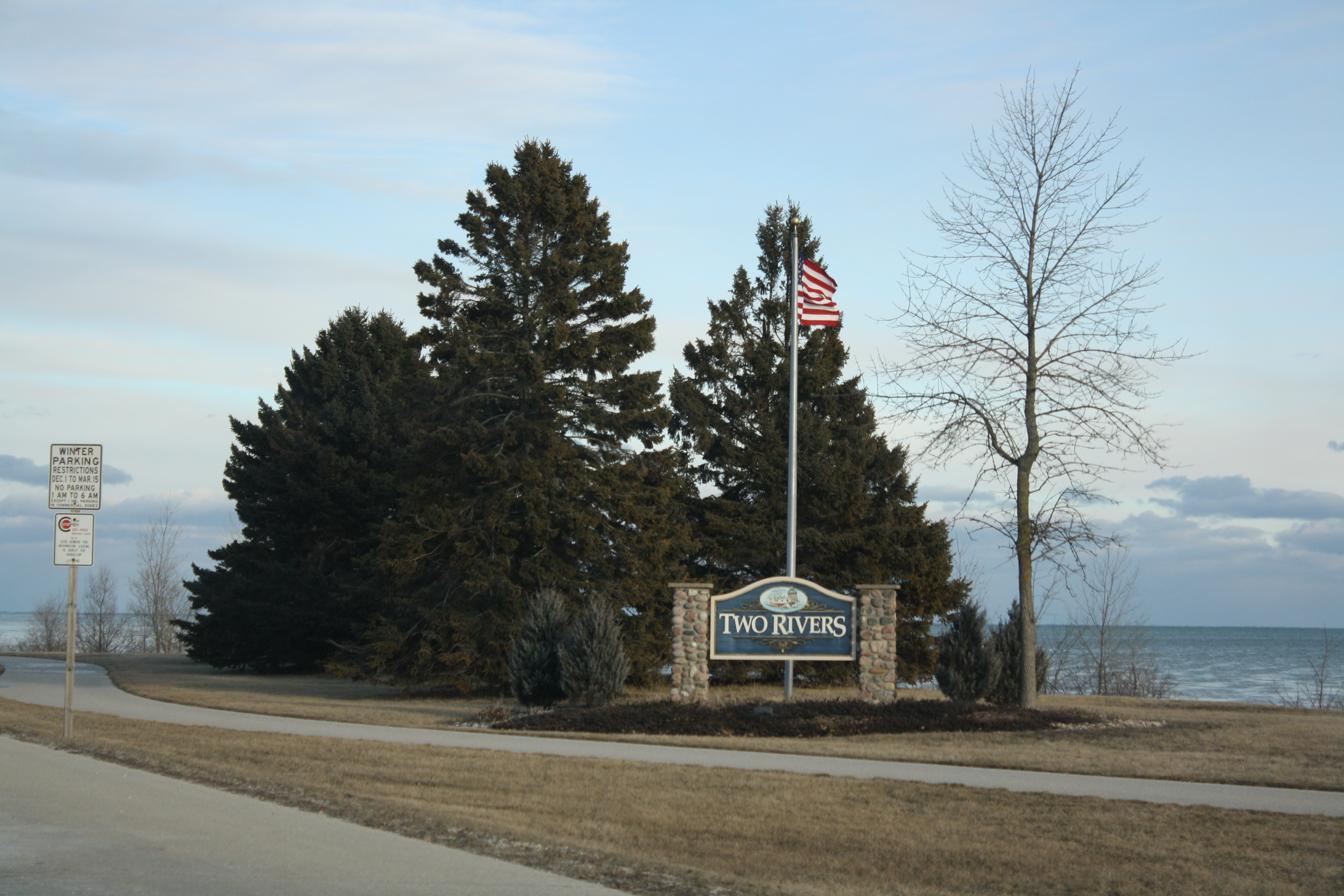
Welcome sign

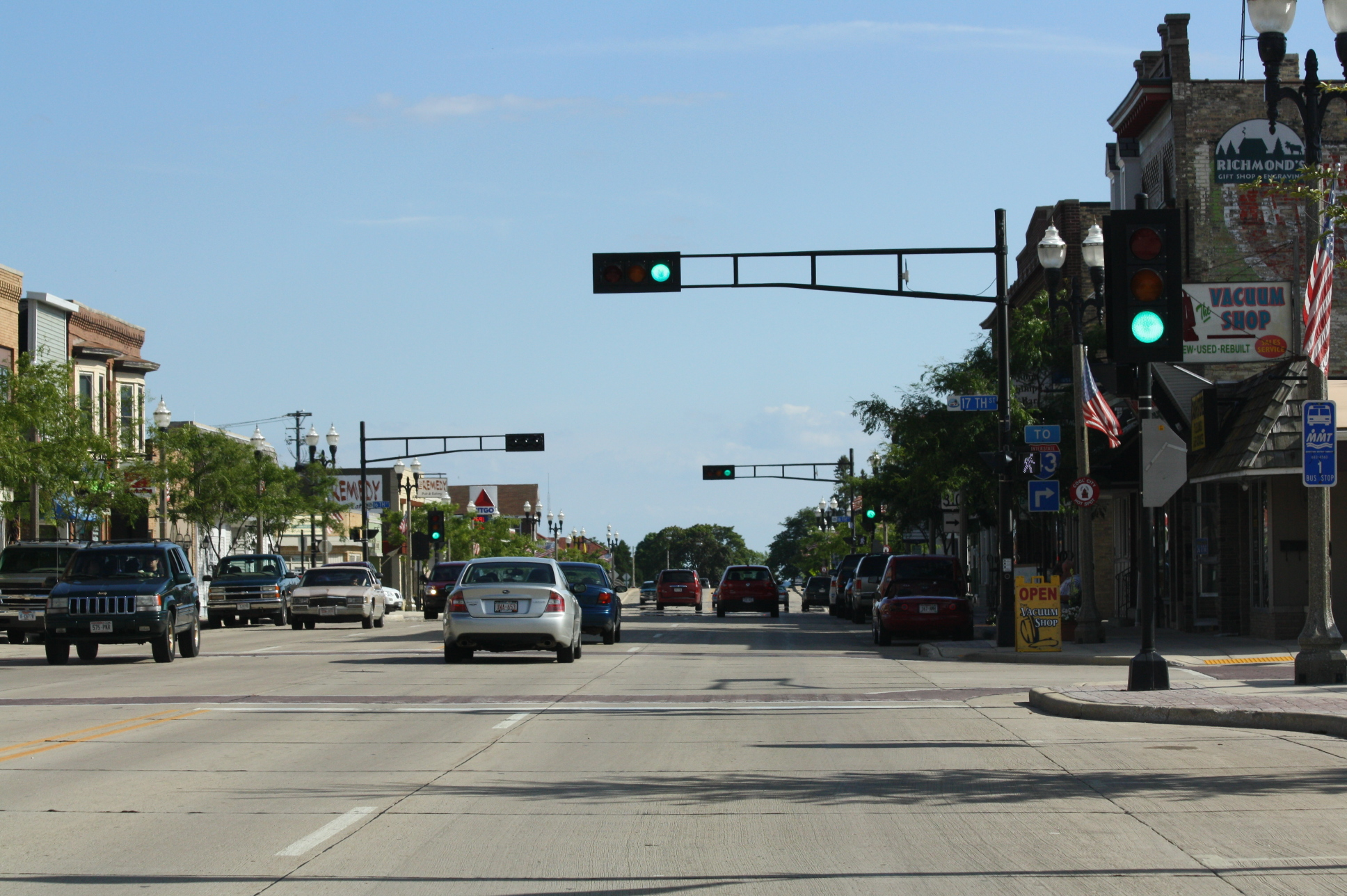
A portion of the Central Park Historic District

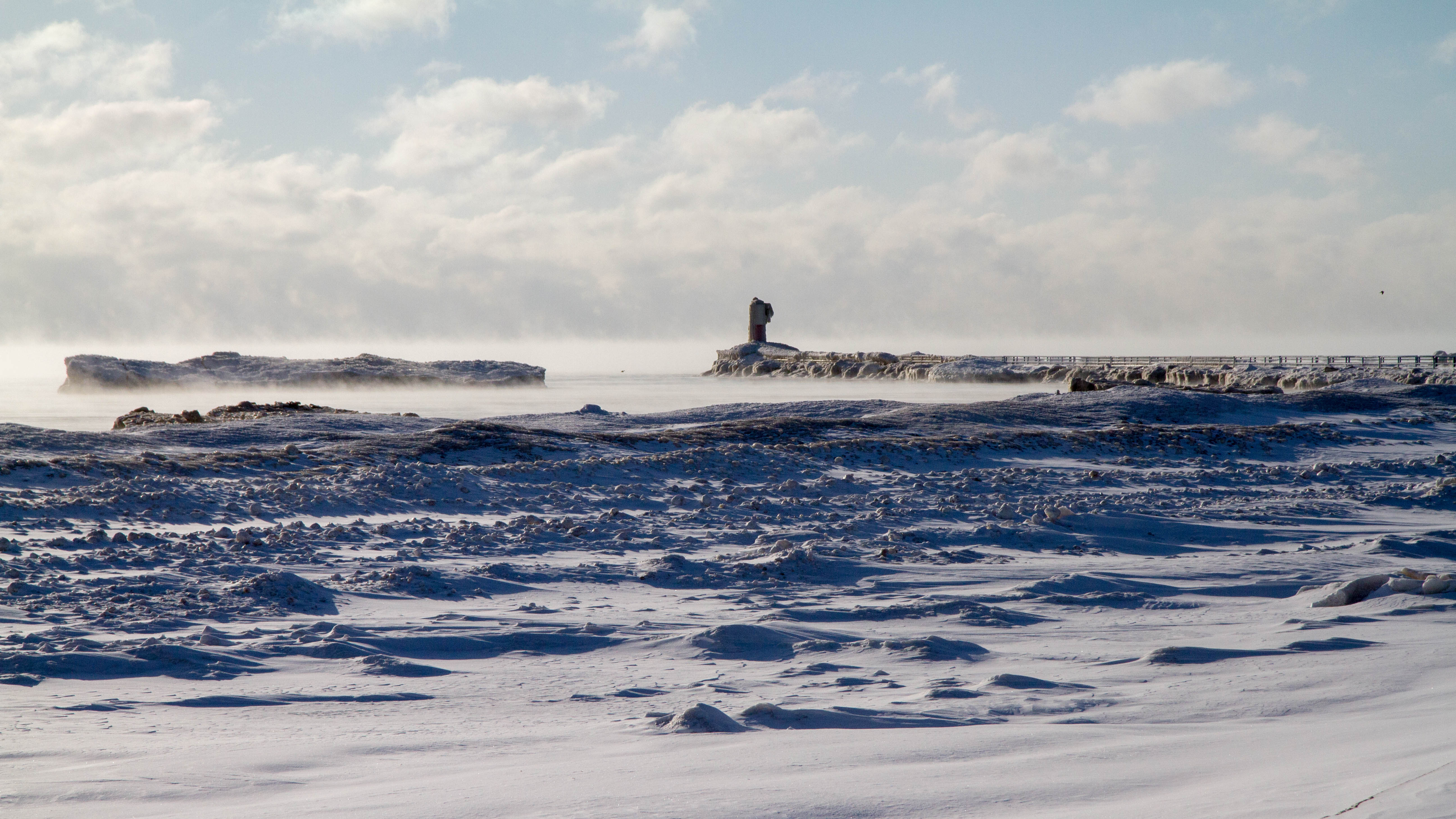
Beacon

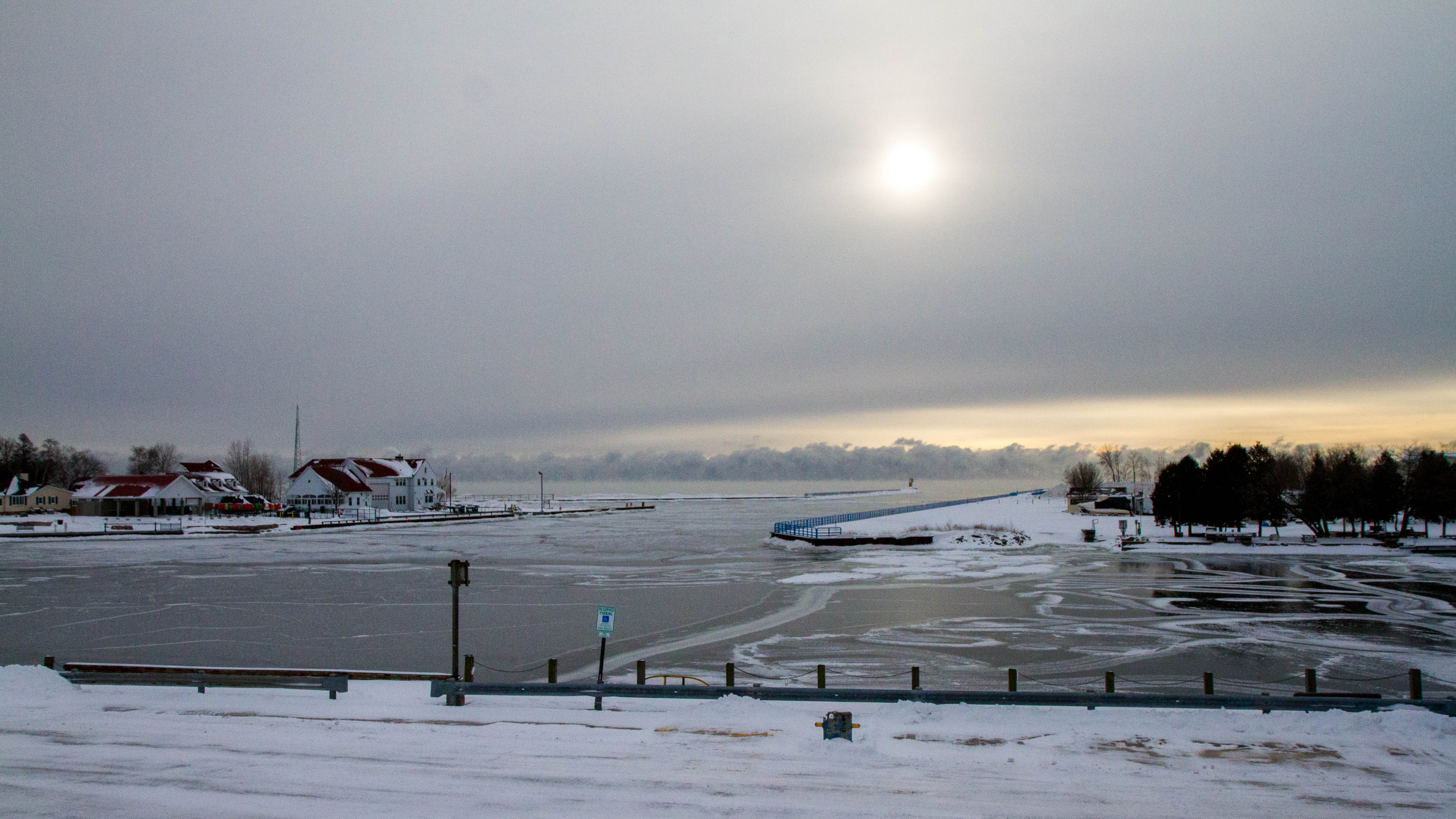
Two Rivers harbor frozen over
