= Mary Aquinas Kinskey =

American aviator (1894–1985)

Sister Mary Aquinas Kinskey, O.S.F.
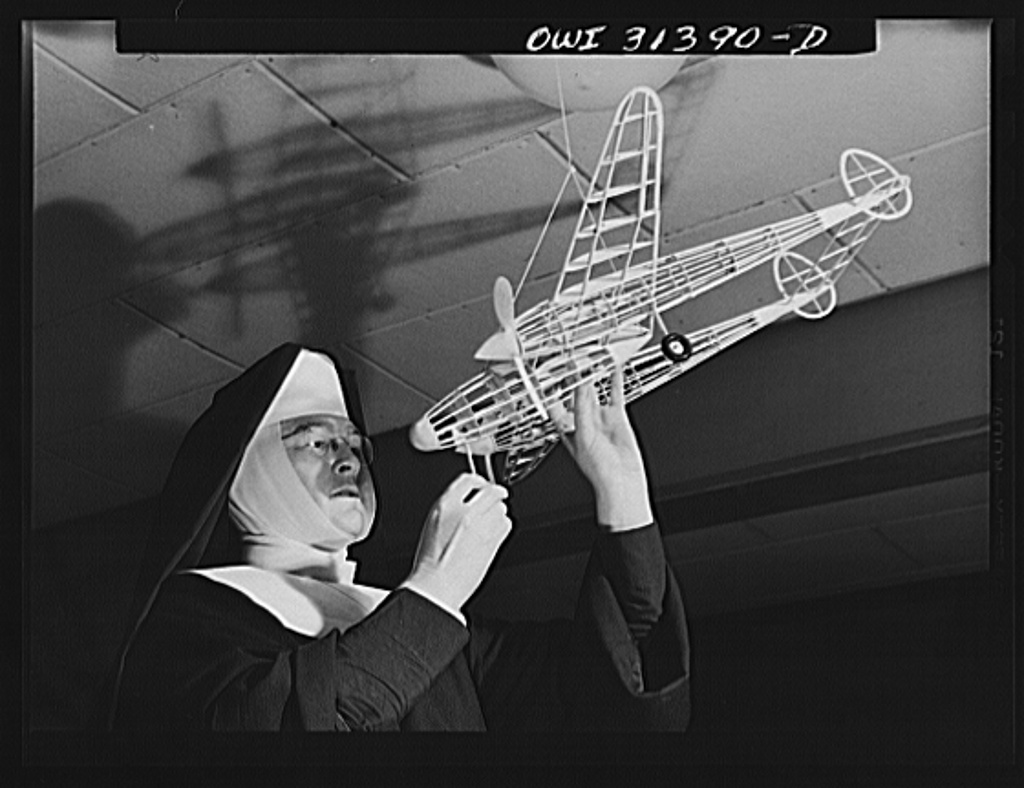

Personal life
- Born: Mary Kinskey; May 27, 1894 Zanesville, Ohio, United States
- Died: October 20, 1985 (aged 91) Manitowoc, Wisconsin, United States

Religious life
- Religion: Catholic
- Institute: Franciscan Sisters of Christian Charity

Mary Aquinas Kinskey (born Mary Kinskey; May 27, 1894 – October 20, 1985) O.S.F., was an American Franciscan Religious Sister who was an expert in and teacher of aerodynamics and aviation. She was also an accomplished pilot.

== Biography ==
Born Mary Kinskey in 1894 in Zanesville, Ohio, she entered the novitiate of the Franciscan Sisters of Christian Charity located in Manitowoc, Wisconsin, in 1911 at the age of 17. After completing that initial stage of membership in the congregation, she was assigned to teach, and was enrolled to gain her higher education at the Catholic University of America in Washington, D.C. during the summer breaks.

Kinksey graduated from Catholic University in 1926 and started work as a high school teacher. She earned a Master of Science degree in physics (graduating cum laude) in 1942 from the University of Notre Dame. Her dissertation was entitled “Electron Projection Study of the Deposition of Thorium on Tantalum". Wanting hands-on aviation experience, she learned to fly in 1943.

According to the Notre Dame Archives and News, “She became a teacher and her interest in aviation stemmed from the enthusiasm for the subject from her students.” She then trained to become a licensed pilot at the Manitowoc County Airport and taught aerodynamics and meteorology at St. Ambrose High School in Ironwood, Michigan, in 1942.

Kinskey was photographed during a wartime PR campaign illustrating various women's contributions to the war effort. These photographs taken by photographer Ann Rosener have been archived by the Library of Congress

During World War II Kinskey was asked to participate in training of military personnel by the Civil Aeronautics Board and taught aviation and aeronautics at Catholic University, her alma mater, to members of the United States Armed Forces.

Her students referred to her as "Spike" and the "Flying Nun". The latter nickname later caused speculation about her possible influence on the television show The Flying Nun when it premiered in 1967.

On November 12, 1956, Kinskey appeared as herself in "The Pilot", a biographical episode of the CBS Television Network anthology series "Westinghouse Studio One." She was portrayed in the episode by actress Nancy Kelly.

In 1957, Kinskey received a special citation from the United States Air Force for her “outstanding contributions to the advancement of air power in the interest of national security and world peace.”

In 1977, Kinksey retired to the motherhouse of the congregation in Manitowoc after suffering a stroke. She lived there until her death from a heart attack on October 20, 1985.

== Gallery ==
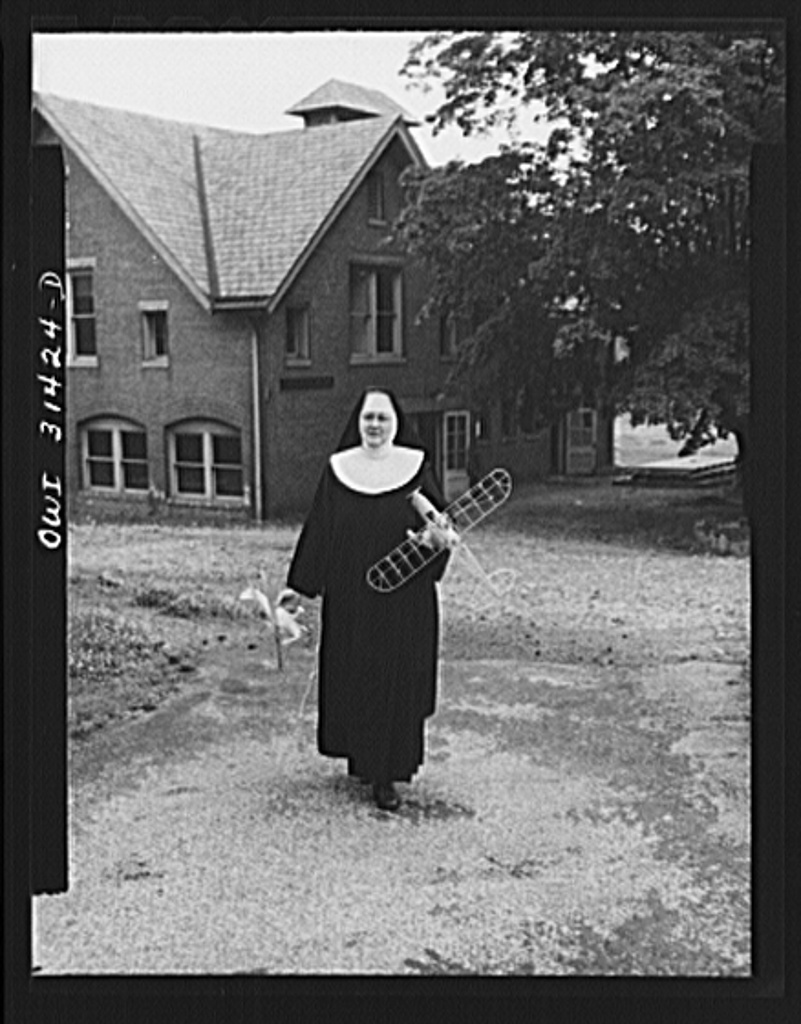
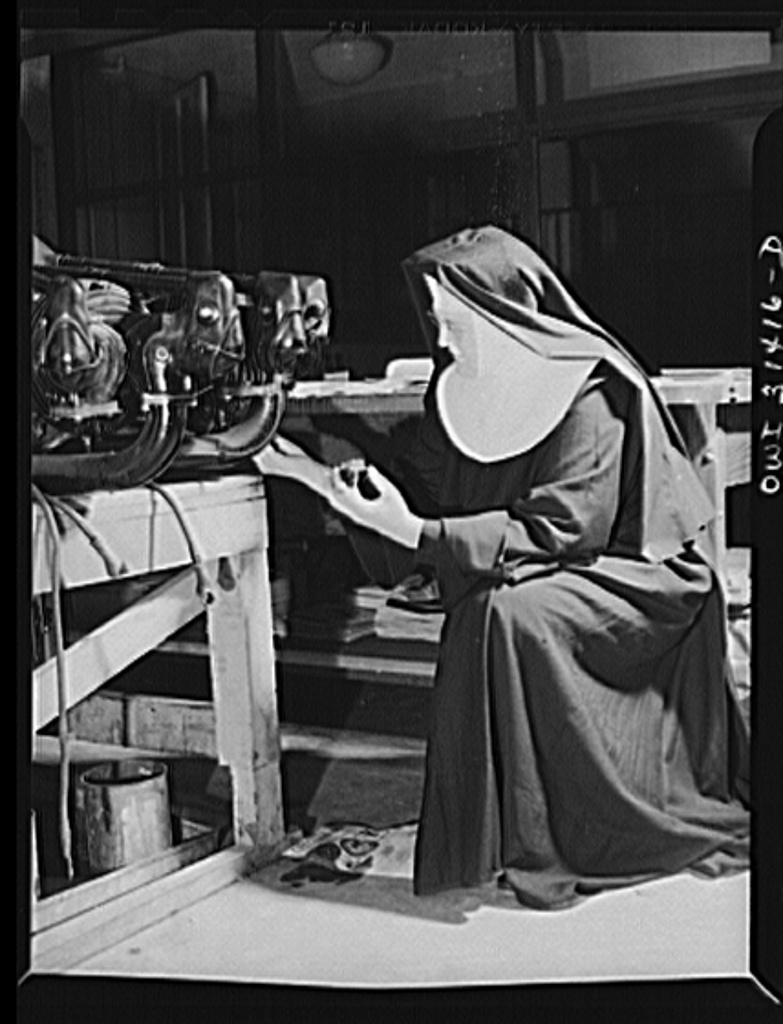
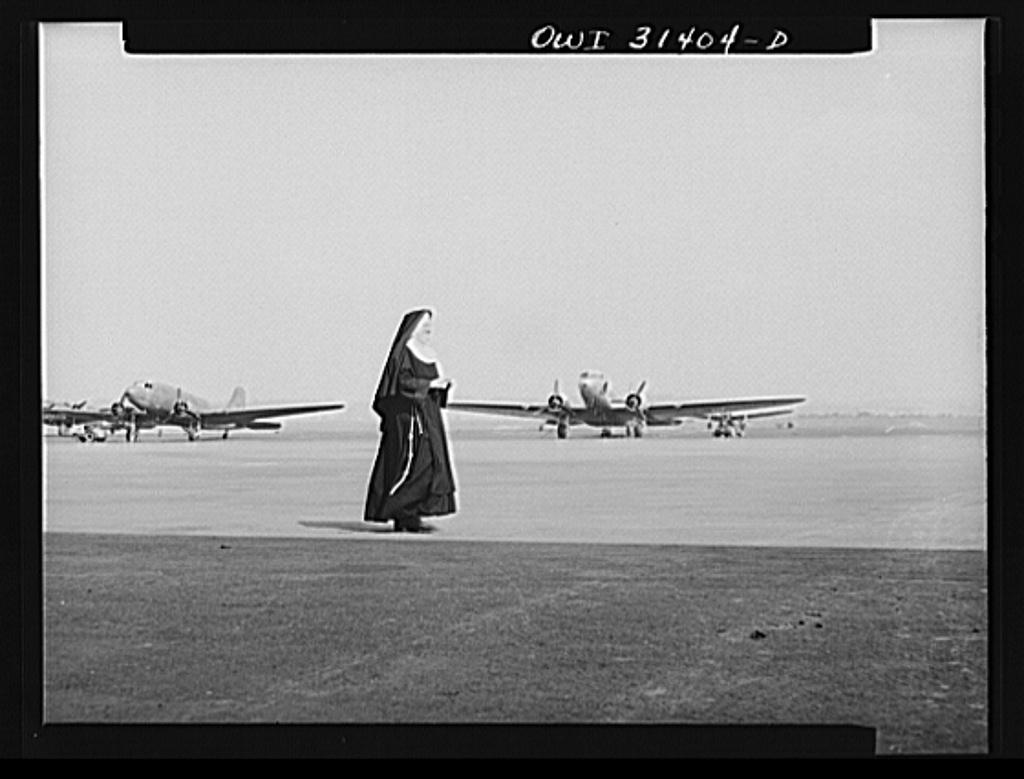
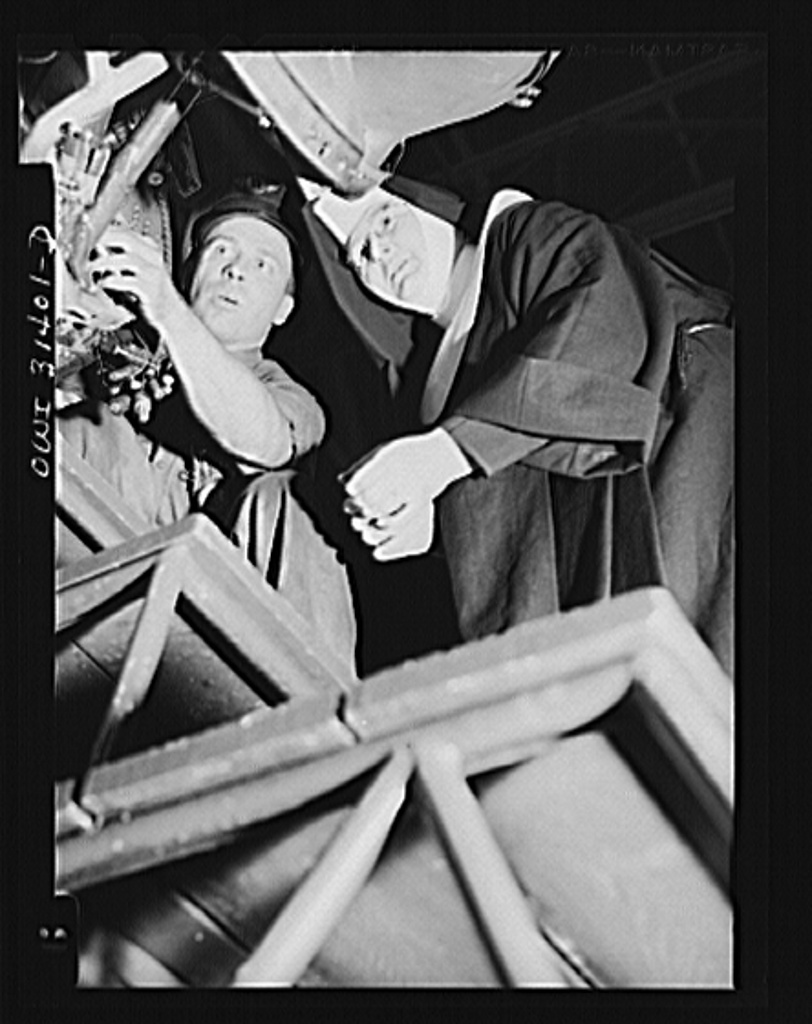
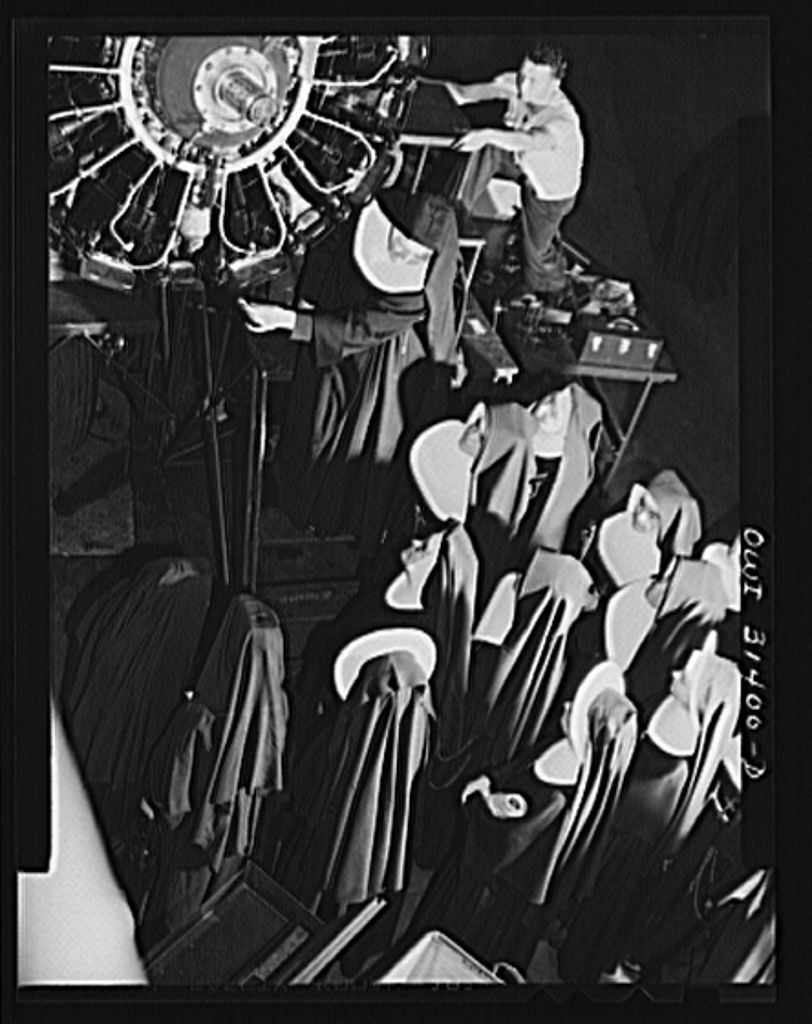
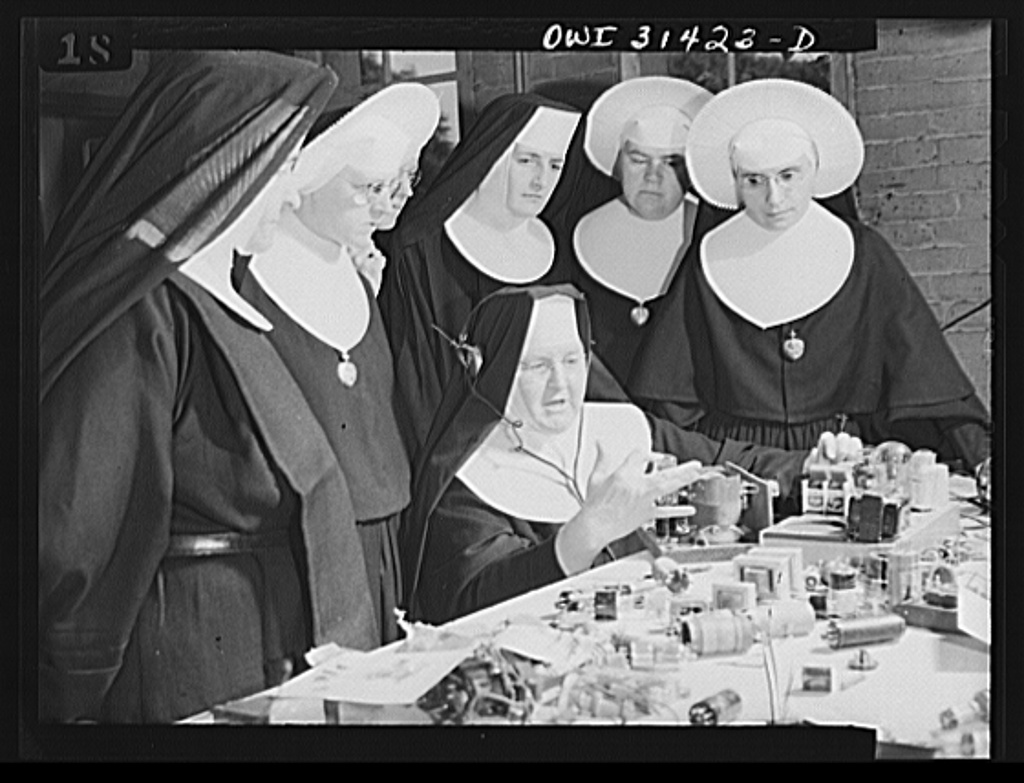
