= Holy Family College (Wisconsin) =

Private Catholic college in Manitowoc, Wisconsin

- Seal of Holy Family College
- Former names: Holy Family College (1935–1972); Silver Lake College of the Holy Family (1972-2019)
- Motto: Pax huic domui
- Motto in English: "Peace to this house"
- Type: Private, liberal arts
- Active: 1935–2020
- Religious affiliation: Roman Catholic (Franciscan Sisters of Christian Charity)
- President: Robert B. Callahan
- Academic staff: 75 full-time faculty and staff
- Students: 500 (2015)
- Location: Manitowoc, Wisconsin, U.S. 44.0711°N 87.7443°W
- Campus: 36 acres (15 ha); Suburban
- Colors: Blue and white
- Nickname: Lakers
- Sporting affiliations: NAIA – Independent
- Mascot: Freddy the Pheasant
- Website: www.holyfamilycollege.edu

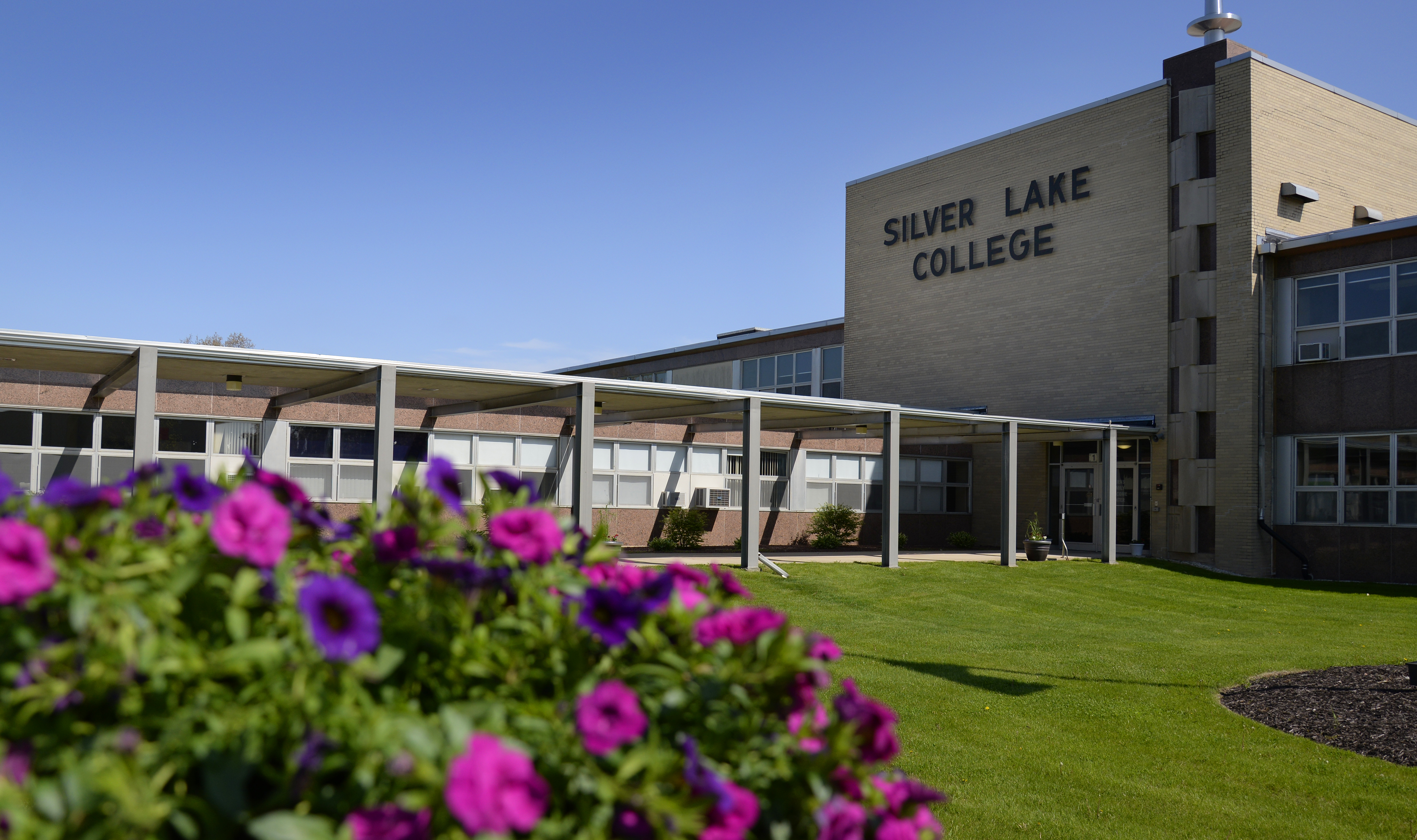
Main Hall

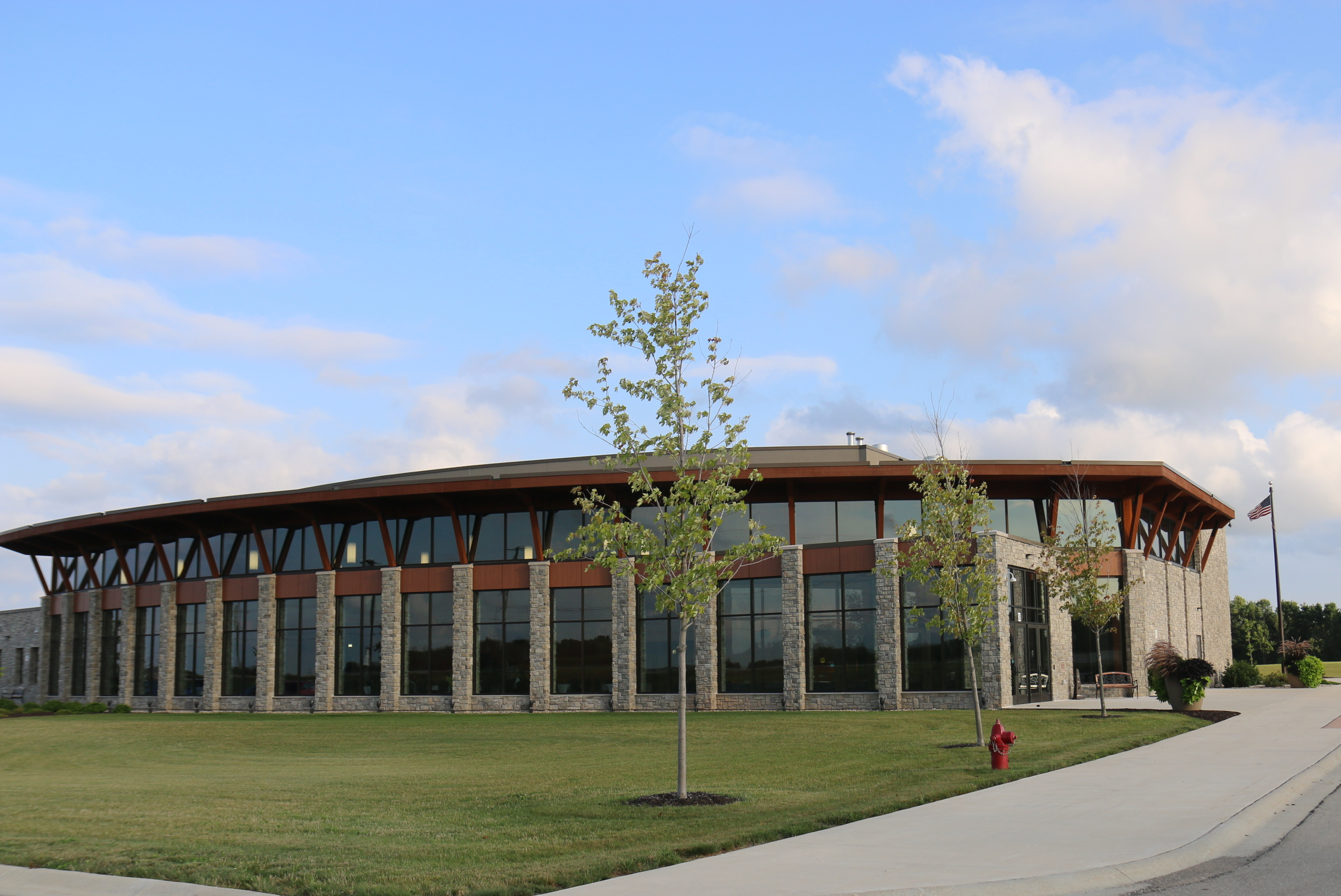
Franciscan Music Center

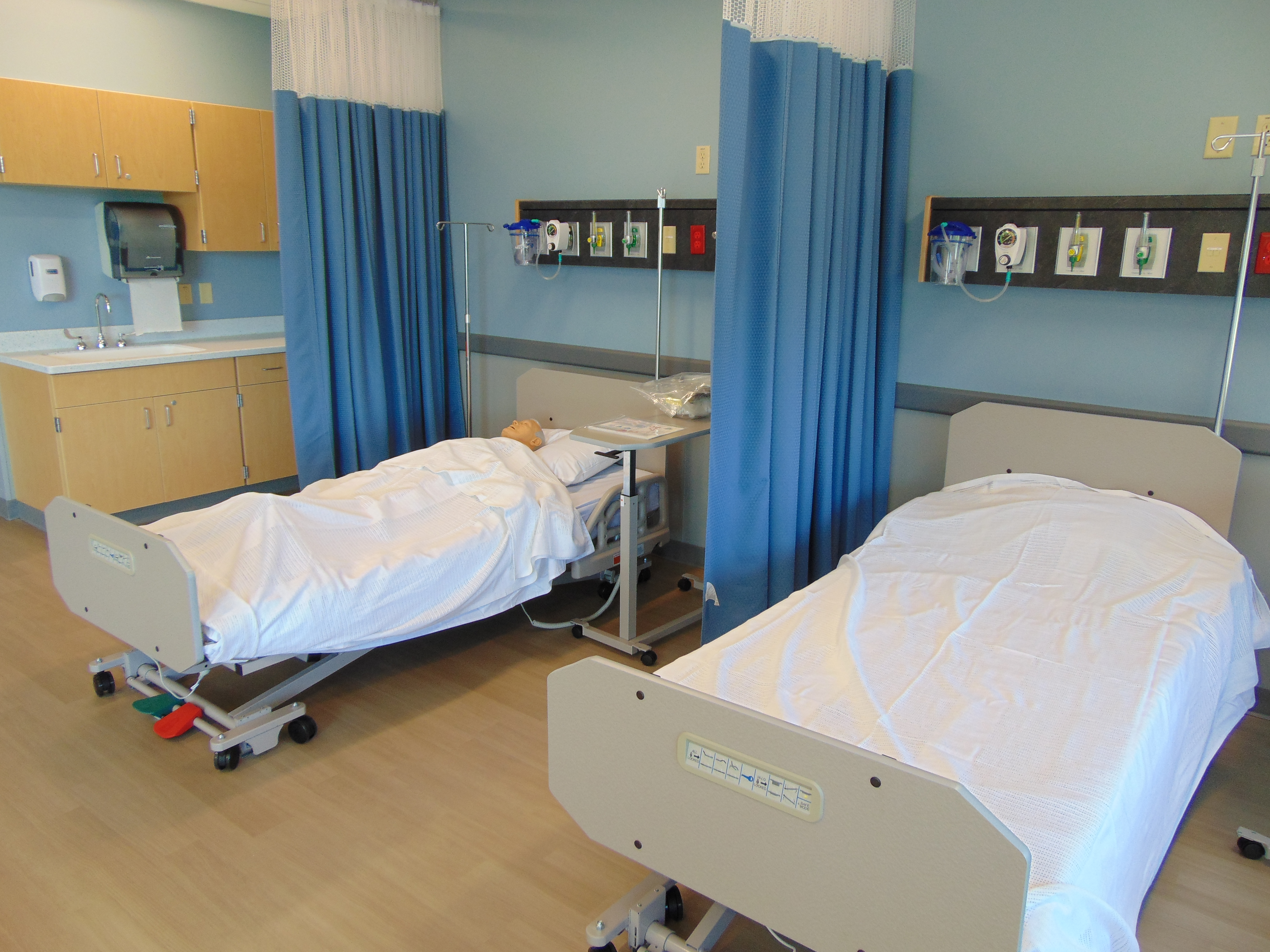
Nursing Wing

Holy Family College was a private Catholic liberal arts college in Manitowoc and Manitowoc Rapids, Wisconsin, United States. Founded as an academy in 1885 by the Franciscan Sisters of Christian Charity, the college achieved four-year college status in 1935 and was then called Holy Family College. In 1972 the college became separately incorporated from the Franciscan order, and was renamed Silver Lake College. The college announced it was closing in 2020, with the final classes in August 2020. The college was connected through the same Franciscan order to Manitowoc's major hospital, Holy Family Memorial.

== History ==
Holy Family College traces its history to 1885 when the Franciscan Sisters of Christian Charity established Holy Family Academy and Normal School to prepare young women who entered the religious community for teaching. They founded Holy Family College in 1935. The college began admitting lay women in 1957 and became coeducational in 1969.

The college was located in a wing of Holy Family Convent for 25 years. In the late 1950s, a capital campaign was launched to build a new college building on 36 acres adjacent to Holy Family Convent. The new Holy Family College building opened in 1960. In 1972 the college became separately incorporated from the Franciscan order, and was renamed Silver Lake College of the Holy Family.

During the late 1970s and early 1980s, Silver Lake College of the Holy Family expanded programs to nontraditional students. Beginning in the mid-1980s, the college also offered degree-completion programs and professional development coursework.

The St. Joseph Parish church and school, located on campus, added space for meetings, classes and offices. It was named the Generose Enrichment Center for the first college president, Mother M. Generose Cahill, and opened in 2003.

George F. Arnold was appointed the college's first lay president and served from 2004 to 2013.

Clare Hall was renovated to offer on-campus student housing in 2009.

Dr. Robert B. Callahan became Holy Family College's 11th president in 2018.

In September 2019, Silver Lake College announced that it would be renamed Holy Family College, in a return to its Franciscan roots.

In May 2020, Holy Family College announced it would be closing in late August 2020. The college cited increased expenses and the COVID-19 pandemic's effects on enrollment. Demolition of the campus buildings took place in 2022.

== Academics ==
Holy Family College offered 21 undergraduate programs and three graduate programs.

Accelerated evening coursework on the main campus in Manitowoc and at outreach sites in the state were offered to those with associate degrees who were pursuing a bachelor's or graduate degree. Programs also included academic counseling and credit for prior learning. Other available coursework included teacher certification and certificate programs ranging from business to ministry to social work.

=== Four-year nursing program ===
With a Bachelor of Science in nursing completion program already in place, Silver Lake College opened a four-year Bachelor of Science in Nursing program in its renovated, $1.5 million nursing wing in 2016.

=== Work college ===
In 2016 Silver Lake College initiated SLC Works, a program that incorporated jobs into students' schedules in order to give them work experience, build their résumés and apply money earned toward their student debt. In the 2016–17 academic year, all new full-time residential freshmen and transfer students began participating in SLC Works as a condition of enrollment.

== Athletics ==
At the time of the school's closure, Holy Family (HFC) athletic teams were known as the Lakers. The college was a member the National Association of Intercollegiate Athletics (NAIA) when it joined the organization as "Silver Lake College" in 2016, primarily competing as an NAIA Independent within the Association of Independent Institutions (AII) from 2016–17 to 2019–20. They were also a member of the United States Collegiate Athletic Association (USCAA) until after the 2015–16 school year.

Holy Family (HFC) competed in ten intercollegiate varsity sports: Men's sports included basketball, bowling, cross country and soccer; while women's sports included basketball, bowling, cross country, soccer, softball and volleyball.

== Accreditation ==
Holy Family College was accredited by the Higher Learning Commission, the National Association of Schools of Music, and the Commission on Collegiate Nursing Education.

== State of Wisconsin certifications ==
The college's certifications included the Wisconsin Board of Nursing, Wisconsin Social Work Certificate, and the Wisconsin Department of Public Instruction.

== Memberships ==
Silver Lake was a member of the Wisconsin Association of Independent Colleges and Universities, the National Association of Independent Colleges and Universities, and the Council for Higher Education Accreditation.
