= Manitowoc County Airport =

Airport in Manitowoc, Wisconsin, USA

- IATA: MTW; ICAO: KMTW; FAA LID: MTW

Summary
- Airport type: Public
- Owner: County of Manitowoc
- Serves: Manitowoc, Wisconsin
- Opened: October 1937
- Time zone: CST (UTC−06:00)
  - Summer (DST): CDT (UTC−05:00)
- Elevation AMSL: 651 ft / 198 m
- Coordinates: 44°07′44″N 087°40′50″W

Map

Runways
Direction	Length		Surface
Direction	ft	m	Surface
17/35	5,001	1,524	Asphalt
7/25	3,341	1,018	Asphalt

Statistics
- Aircraft operations (2021): 33,100
- Based aircraft (2024): 60
- Source: Federal Aviation Administration

Manitowoc County Airport (IATA: MTW, ICAO: KMTW, FAA LID: MTW) is located two miles northwest of Manitowoc, in Manitowoc County, Wisconsin. It is 21 miles from Whistling Straights golf course and 34 minutes from Road America.

The Federal Aviation Administration (FAA) National Plan of Integrated Airport Systems for 2025–2029 categorized it as a local general aviation facility.

The first airline flights were North Central DC-3s in 1953–1954; successor Republic pulled out in 1981–1983.

== Facilities ==
The airport covers 710 acres (287 ha) at an elevation of 651 feet (198 m). It has two asphalt runways: the primary runway 17/35 is 5,001 by 100 feet (1,524 x 30 m) and the crosswind runway 7/25 is 3,341 by 100 feet (1,018 x 30 m).

For the year ending September 14, 2021 the airport had 33,100 aircraft operations, an average of 91 per day: 97% general aviation, 3% air taxi and less than 1% military. In August 2024, there were 60 aircraft based at this airport: 55 single-engine, 2 multi-engine, 1 jet and 2 glider.

The Manitowoc (MTW) DME is on the field; the VOR function of this navaid was decommissioned sometime in mid-2019.

Lakeshore Aviation was the fixed-base operator (FBO) until December 1, 2013, when Manitowoc County took over operations.

== Ground transportation ==
Public transit service is provided by Maritime Metro Transit, with the nearest bus stops on Menasha Avenue.

== See also ==
- List of airports in Wisconsin
