= Rahr West Art Museum =

Art museum in Manitowoc, Wisconsin

- Joseph Vilas Jr. House
- U.S. National Register of Historic Places
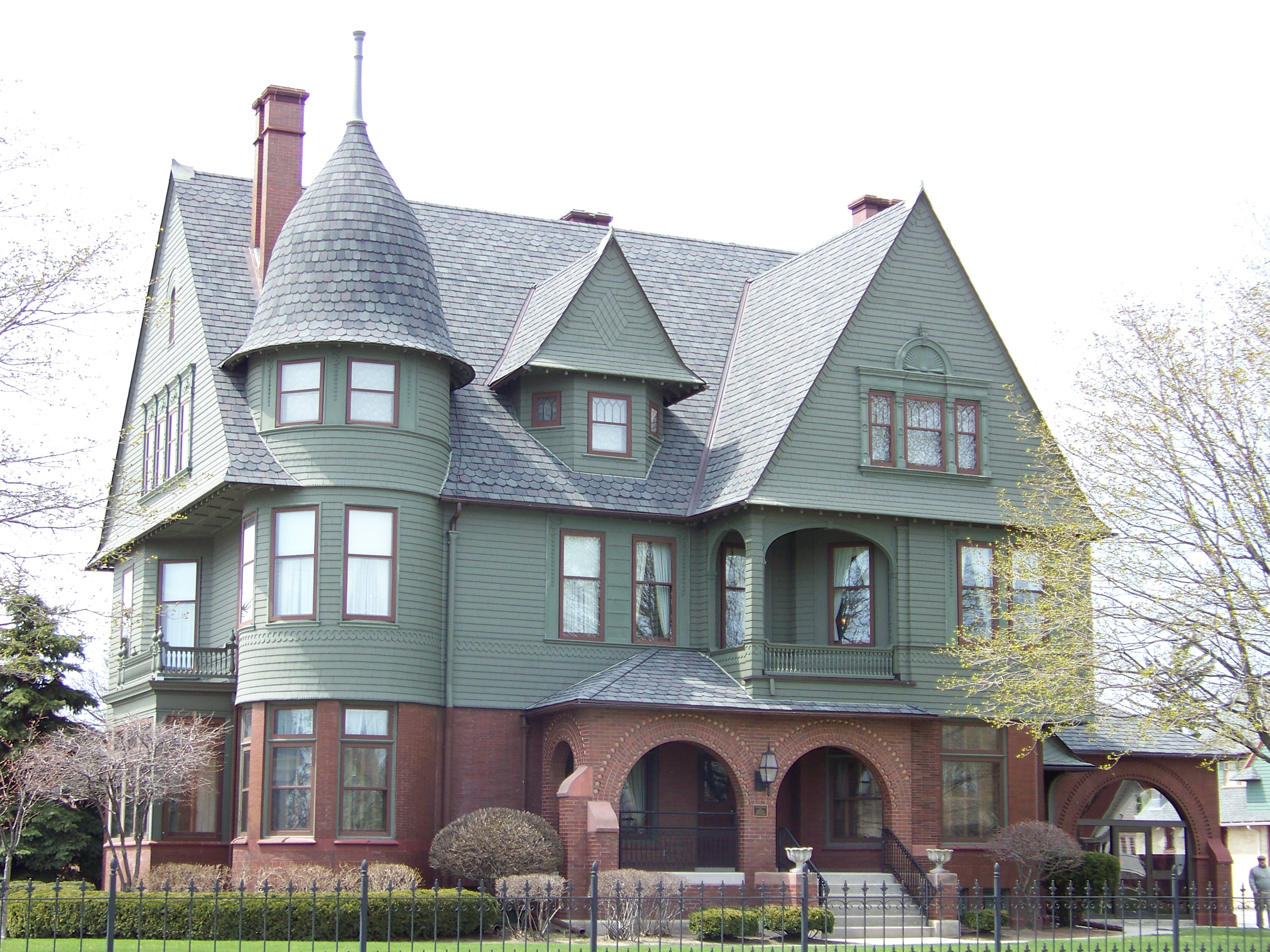

- Location within Wisconsin Location within the United States
- Location: 610-616 N 8th St, Manitowoc, Wisconsin
- Coordinates: 44°5′57″N 87°39′29″W
- Built: 1891-1893
- Architect: George Ferry, Alfred Clas
- Architectural style: Queen Anne style architecture in the United States, Shingle Style
- NRHP reference No.: 77000035
- Added to NRHP: April 29, 1977

The Rahr–West Art Museum is an art museum in Manitowoc, Wisconsin. It is located in the Joseph Vilas Jr. House, which is listed on the National Register of Historic Places. The house is a significant example of Queen Anne style architecture in the United States.

== House ==
The house was built between 1891 and 1893 for Joseph Vilas (1832-1905) and his wife Mary (1837-1901) at a cost of between $35,000 and $50,000. Joseph Vilas was a merchant and twice the mayor of Manitowoc. The 13-room house was designed by George Ferry and Alfred Clas right before they designed the Pabst Mansion in Milwaukee, Wisconsin. The house sat vacant from Vilas' death in 1905 until Rahr Malting President Reinhardt Rahr purchased it in 1910. His widow donated the house to the city of Manitowoc in 1941 to use as a museum.

== Rooms ==
In the house's first floor, the open carriageway entrance was enclosed in 1975. During a 1950 renovation, a modern stained glass entrance was added. It leads to a room which used to consist of two rooms - reception hall and a dining room. A fireplace partition was removed in 1950 to create the single room. The Rahr parlor was used for exhibitions for around 20 years until 1977, when it was restored to its 1910 appearance. The walls are covered in silk and bordered rug and it is furnished with original furniture. The room contains a family photograph and a bronze bust by Reinhardt Rahr. One of six remaining original fireplaces is located in the room, and it contains fluted columns, floral swags, and dentils. An oval mirror is located above it. Three adjacent rooms are used to display art.

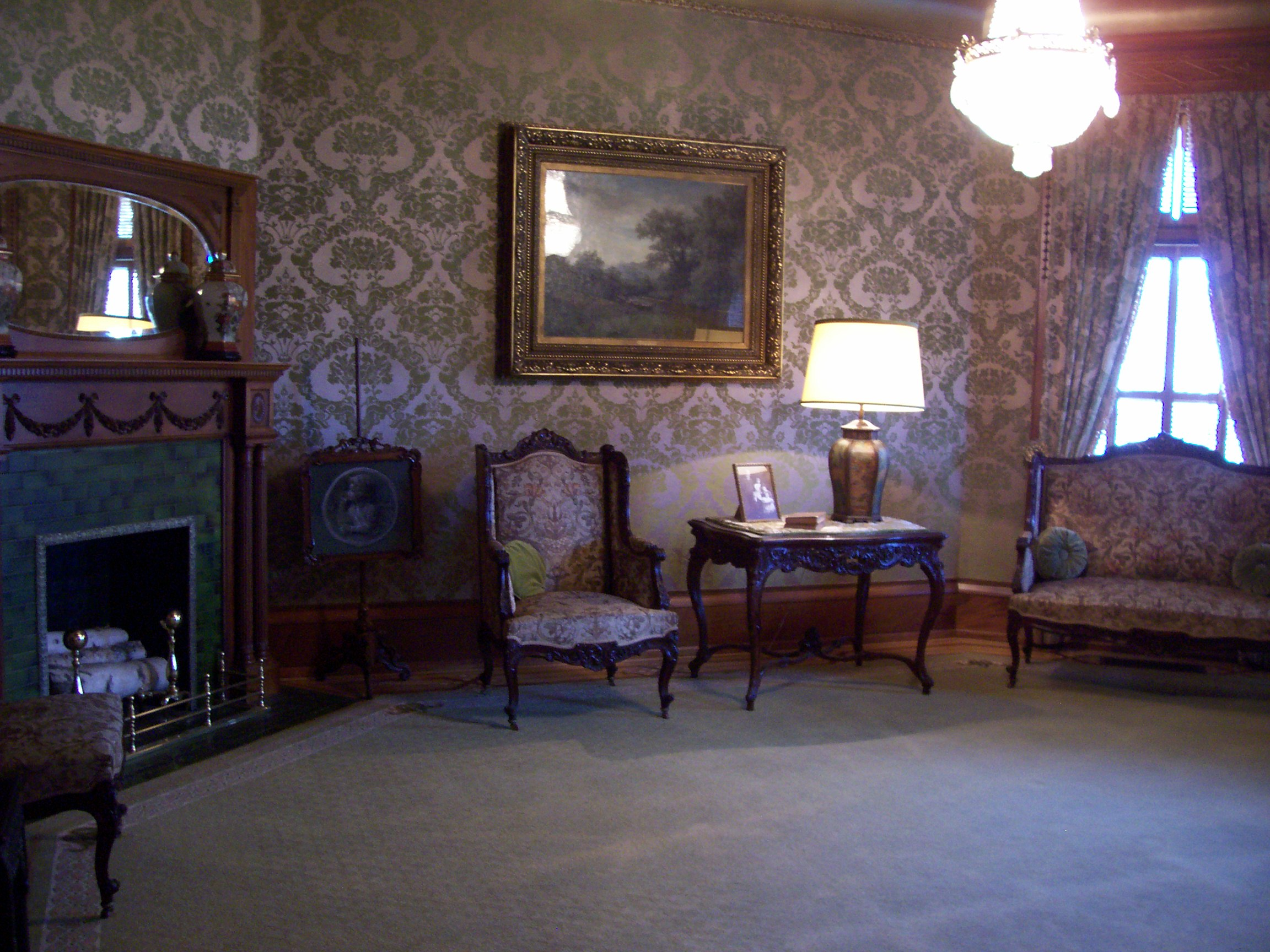
Rahr parlor

The John P. Nash memorial library is located at the top of the stairwell on the house's second floor. Originally a bedchamber, the room was renovated in 1995 by donations from Nash's family. The room contains a bay window, mantel, and a marbel wash basin behind a paneled door. The Schwartz Ivories Room was once a dressing or servant's room. It now contains the Simon Schwartz Collection of Chinese Ivories, which was donated to the museum in 1973. The collection contains items from over 300 years of history including over 40 rare pieces. The Porcelain Room houses a collection of hand-painted porcelain sculptures created by Boehm Studios. Mrs. Guido Rahr's collection of dolls are displayed in the Doll Room. They were acquired in her travels around the world. The items are ceremonial, folklore, and popular figures from their country. Furnished dollhouses in the room were donated by Amy Brady. The dollhouses contain 1930s furnishings from Marshall Field's. The Doll Room also contains the furnishings from a Victorian dining room. The Kamogawa Room contains a collection of gifts from Manitowoc's Japanese sister city Kamogawa.

A wing was added to the house in 1975 to hold exhibits. The wing was paid for with donations from John and Ruth West and the Rahr Foundation. Another wing was added in 1986 to display and store a permanent collection of American art donated by the Wests.

The museum's permanent collection holds pieces by Georgia O'Keeffe, Andy Warhol, Picasso, Isidore Bonheur, Eyvind Earle, Milton Avery and Myron Barlow. The Courtyard Garden, located just inside the museum entrance, was established in 1975 by Mrs. John West and the Manitowoc Garden Club. It contains a bronze sculpture Waiting by Bruno Lucchesi in Wisconsin shrubs and trees. The Ruth West Gallery, the largest exhibition space, is used for around 10 exhibitions per year. It sometimes host lectures and recitals. The John West Gallery has exhibitions that changes every four to six weeks. It is sometimes used to display art of the museum's collection.

== Sputnikfest ==
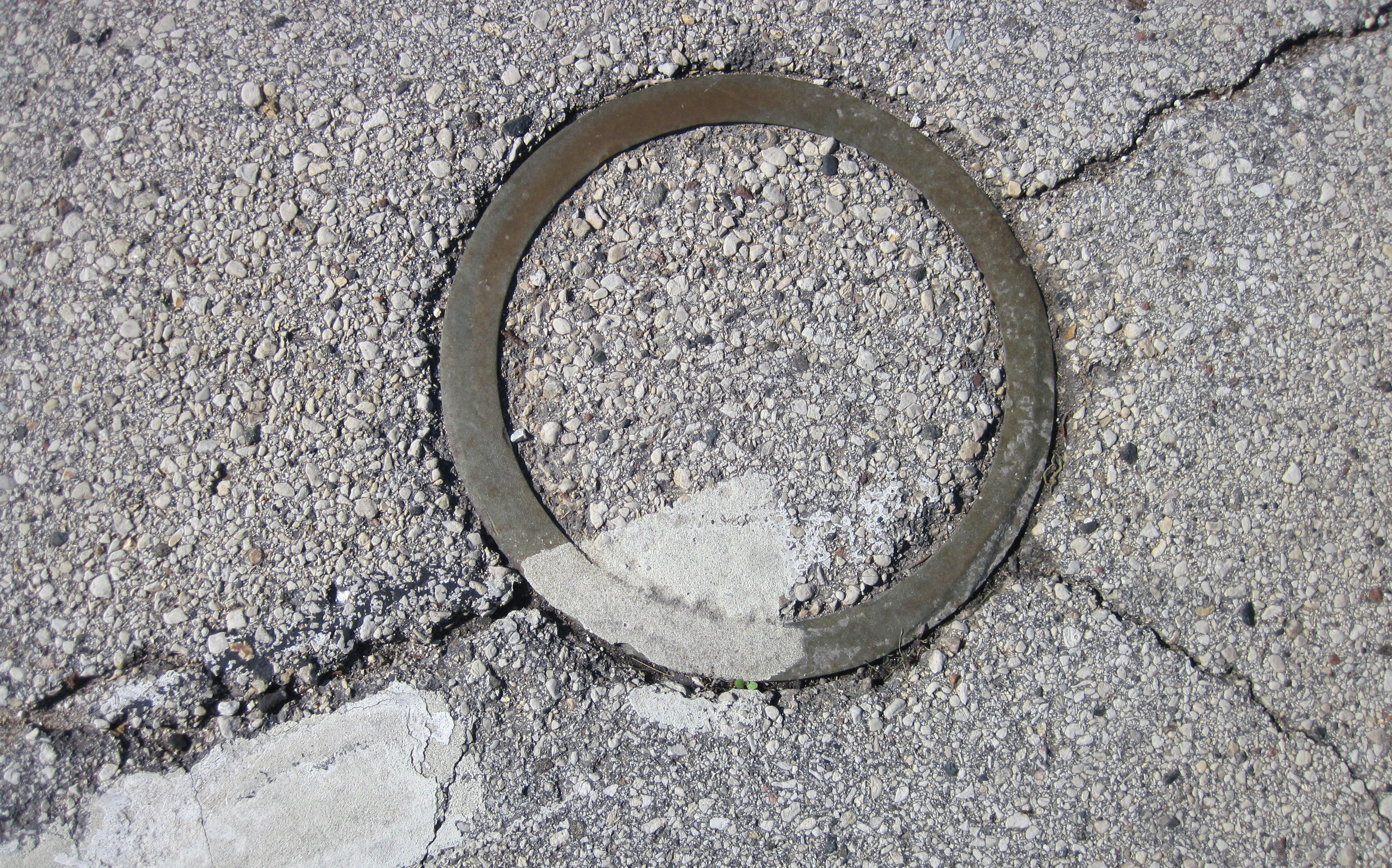
Disk marks location of the Sputnik 4 impact

On September 5, 1962, a 20-pound (9.1 kg) piece of the 7 ton Sputnik 4 crashed on North Eighth Street east of the museum. The impact location is marked with a ring. A cast was made from the original piece before the Soviets claimed it, and the cast was displayed at the museum. The city holds an annual Sputnikfest celebration.

== Images ==
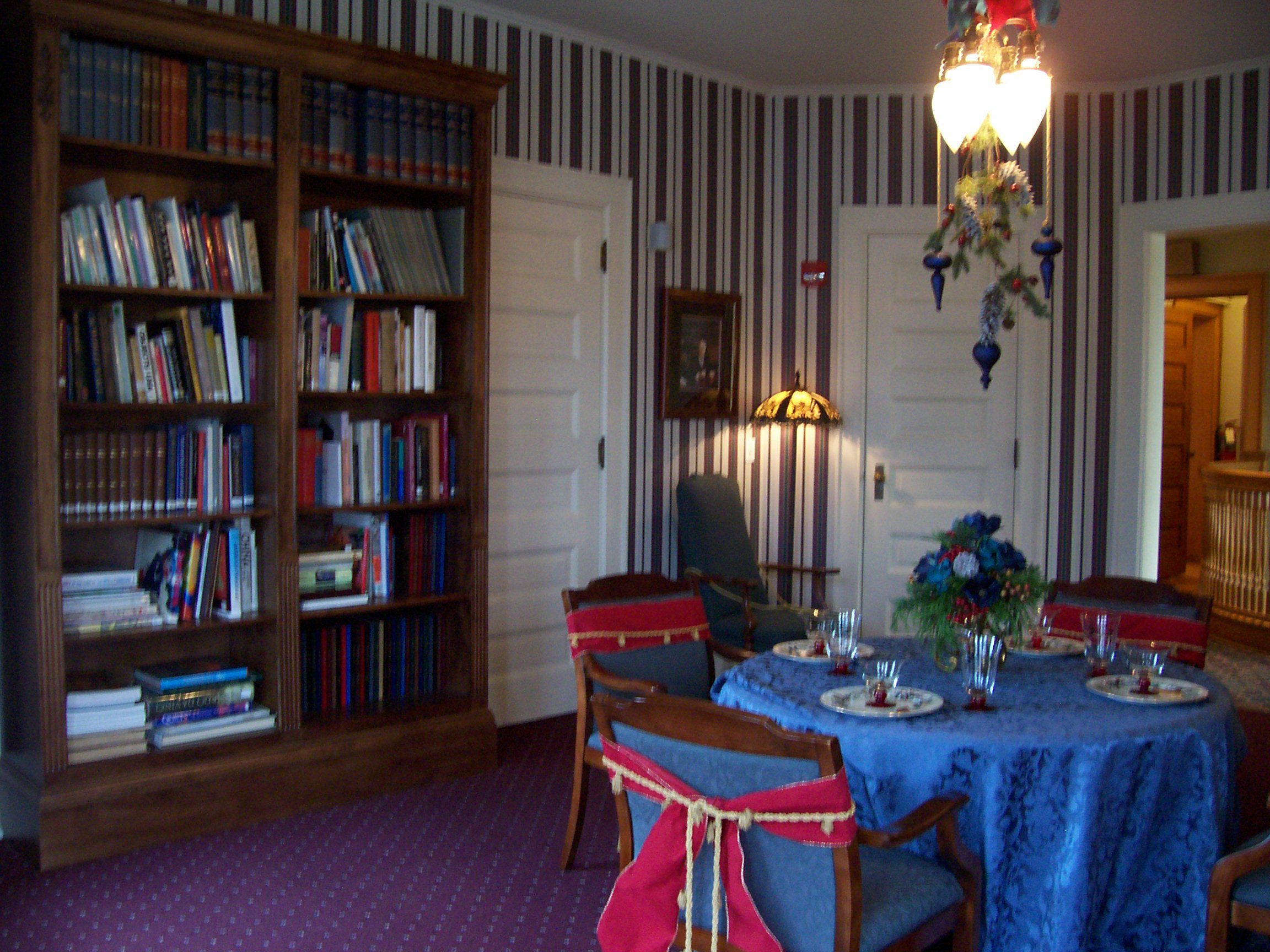
John P. Nash Memorial Library

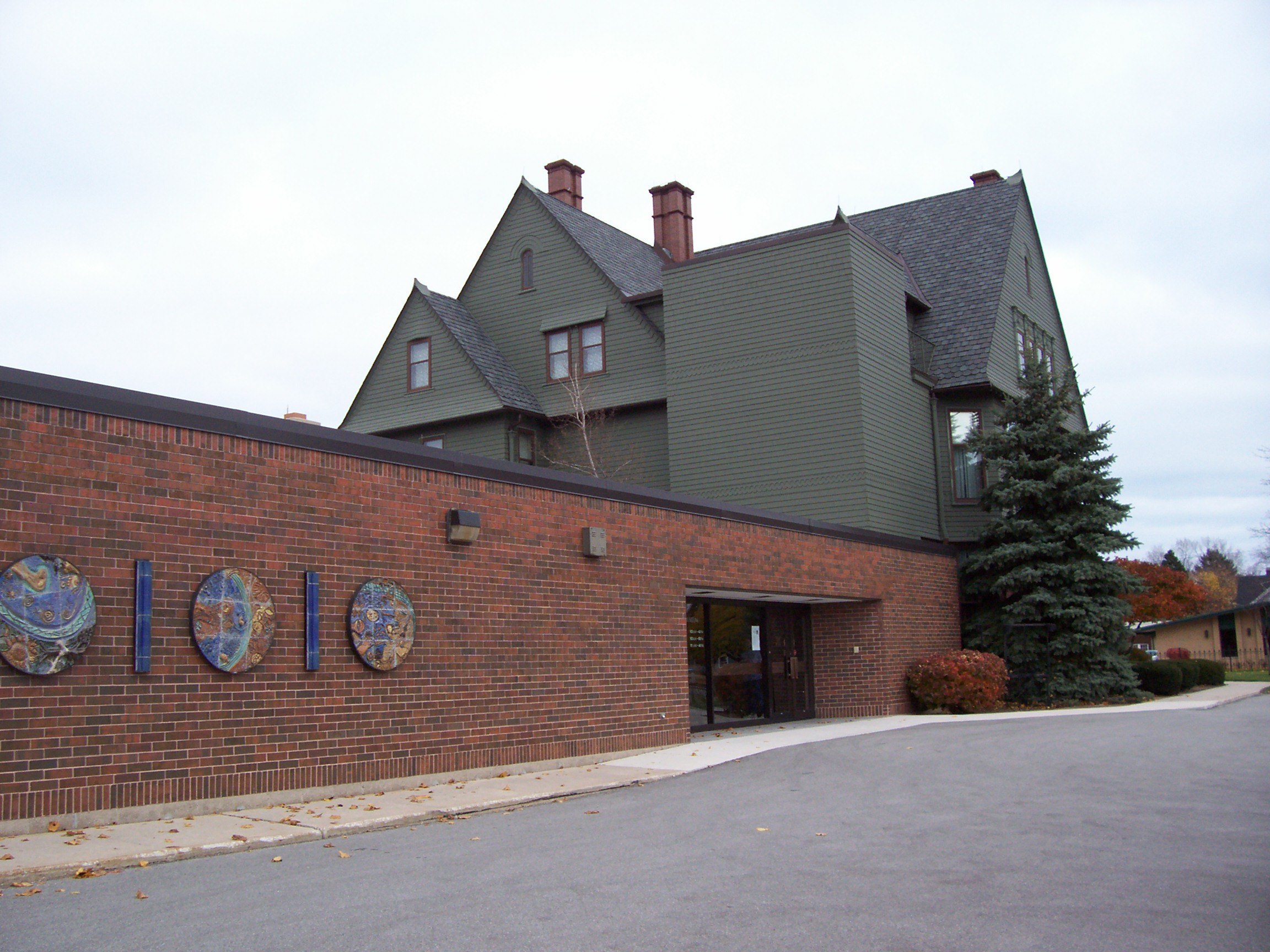
Entrance on wing

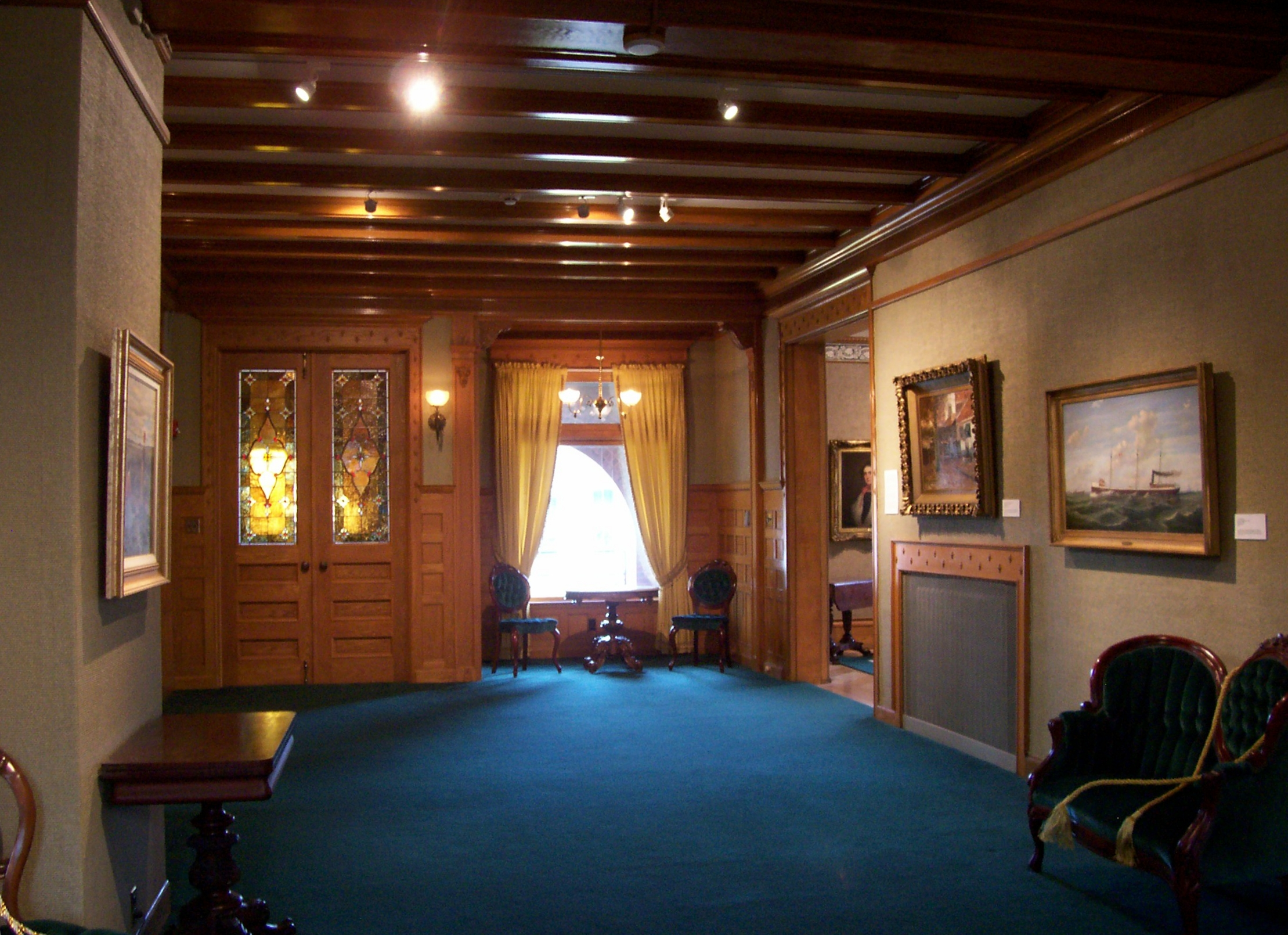
First floor entrance

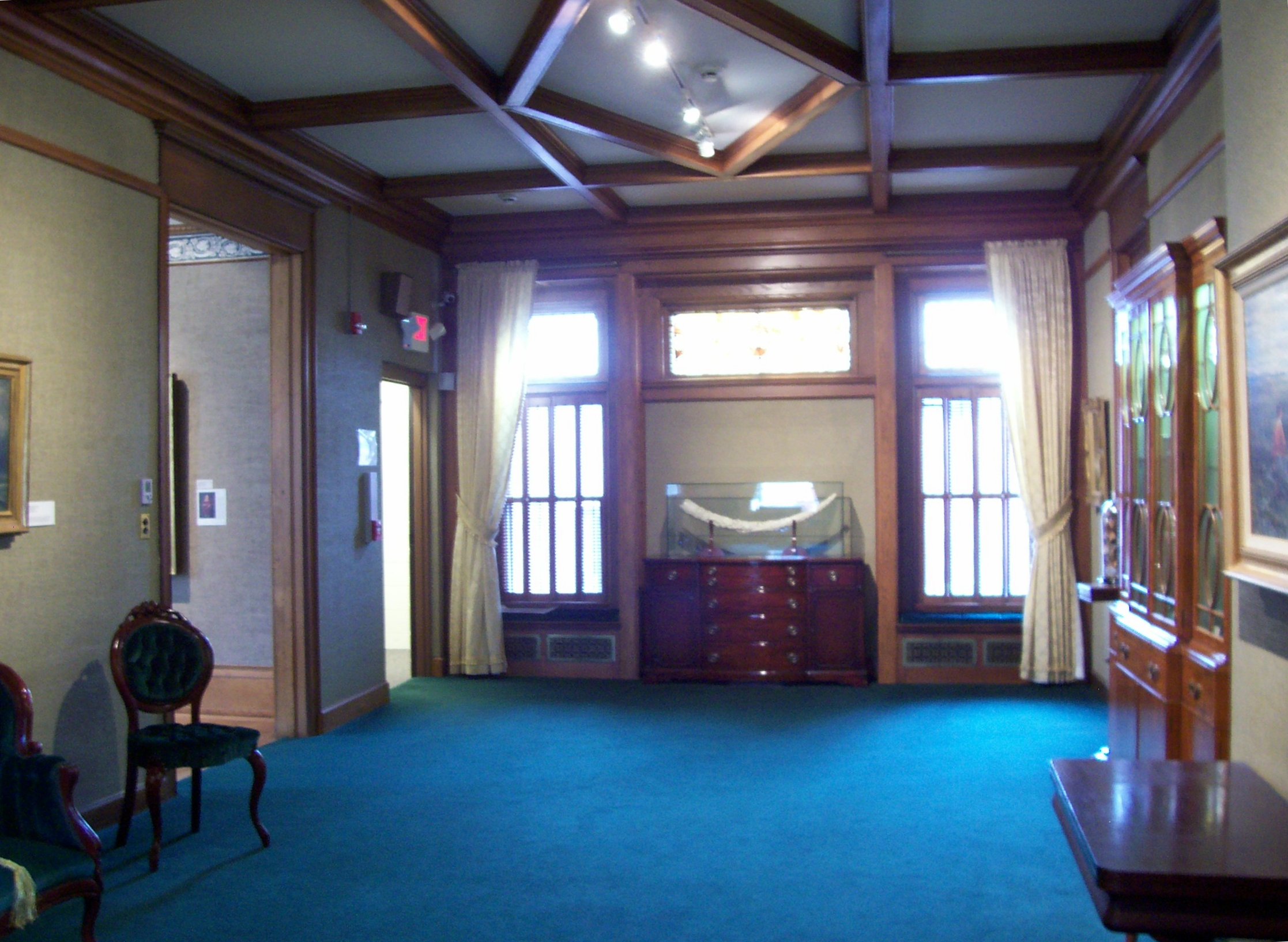
First floor hallway
