= Holy Family Memorial =

Coordinates: 44°5′41″N 87°40′33″W

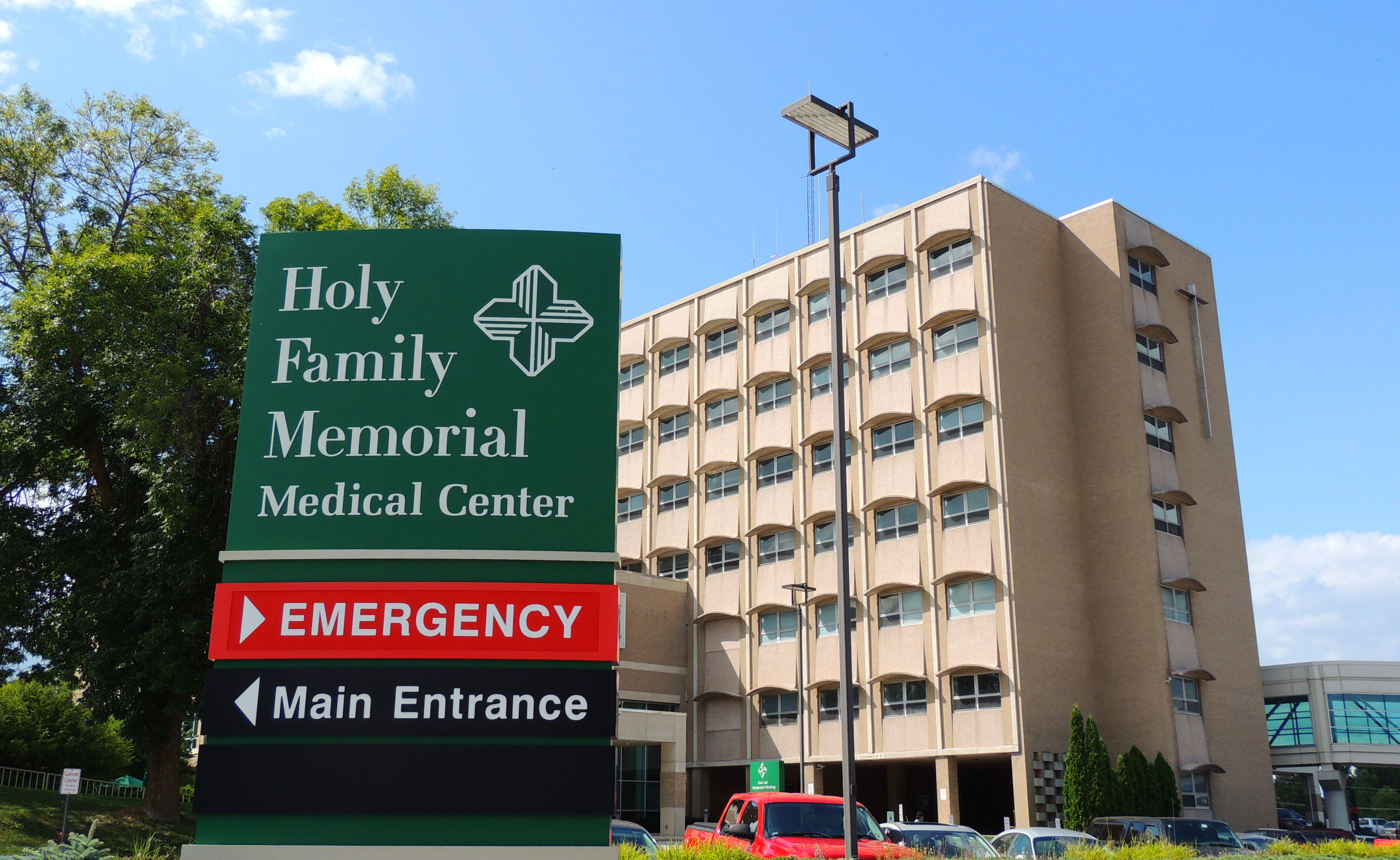
- Holy Family Memorial Hospital in Manitowoc
- Company type: Nonprofit organization
- Industry: Health care system
- Founded: 1899; 126 years ago
- Founder: Franciscan Sisters of Christian Charity
- Headquarters: 2300 Western Avenue; Manitowoc, Wisconsin
- Number of locations: 11
- Area served: Manitowoc and Sheboygan counties
- Revenue: $122.5 million (2019)
- Parent: Froedtert Health
- Website: www.hfmhealth.org

Holy Family Memorial is a non-profit healthcare system headquartered in Manitowoc, Wisconsin. The system operates a hospital and other healthcare facilities throughout Manitowoc and Sheboygan counties in the state of Wisconsin. Holy Family Memorial is recognized as the largest provider of healthcare services in Manitowoc County.

== History ==
The Franciscan Sisters of Christian Charity founded Holy Family Memorial in 1899.

In March 2020, Froedtert Health of Wauwatosa announced its intentions to acquire a minority interest in HFM. In January 2021, Froedtert acquired a majority membership interest in Holy Family Memorial Medical Center.

== See also ==
- Franciscan Sisters of Christian Charity
- Froedtert Health
