= Bio-Blend Fuels =

Bio-Blend Fuels Inc. is a company producing bio-diesel from various materials, including beef tallow and vegetable oil. They are based in Manitowoc, Wisconsin and have an annual capacity of 2.6 million US gallons. The company is notable for producing bio-diesel from pig fat recovered from commercial bacon production facilities.

== History ==
Bio-Blend Fuels tanker

The company was founded in 2005 by husband and wife Dan and Tracy Kaderabek. It was originally launched merely to supply the Kaderabek's boat business with cheap fuel. However, in May 2009, a new plant was opened with a capacity of 2.6 million US gallons (9,800 m^{3}) per year, which provides bio-diesel directly to the pump for sale to the public.

The company is a small player in the U.S. market, in terms of Wisconsin, they have a significant share of the market for bio-diesel. However, they produce an amount smaller than the leading Wisconsin producer, Sanimax, who produce 20 million US gallons (76,000 m^{3}) per year.

== Blends ==
Bio-Blend Fuels produces and sells 100% bio-diesel (B100) manufactured from the raw materials by a process called transesterification. However, unblended bio-diesel is problematic in that it tends to gel at a temperature of 32 °F or below. For this reason bio-diesel sold for use in private vehicles is usually blended with petrodiesel, a common blend being 20% bio-diesel to 80% petrodiesel (B20). A B20 blend gels at around 17 °F, a full 15 degrees below freezing, and hence is much more reliable. Commercial users, on the other hand, such as operators of farm vehicles, are better able to deal with the shortcomings of B100 with appropriate planning and may still wish to take advantage of the price difference. Bio-Blend Fuels is selling B100 at significantly below the national average cost of diesel. Other groups of users may wish to reach a different compromise with a different blend.

For this reason, Bio-Blend Fuels have installed a patented blending system at the new facility. This is able to deliver a blend at the pump to the individual needs of the customer. Sales direct to the public are made through a separate company, American Fuel Blending Systems which also carries out the on-site blending.

== Raw materials ==
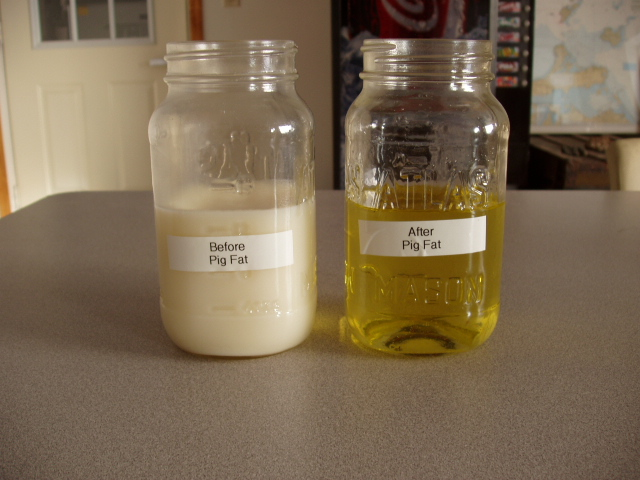
Pig fat recovered from bacon producing plants and after processing into biodiesel.

A number of sources are used in the production of bio-diesel, including the more traditional vegetable oils. However, much publicity surrounded Bio-Blend's decision to source its main ingredient from pig fat. This is largely obtained from meat rendering plants who are producing cooked bacon from pork in microwave ovens. The fat is an unwanted by-product of this process.

Amongst the claimed advantages of Bio-Blends bio-diesel is that it has a sweeter smell than regular bio-diesel. The product smells of bacon, unlike regular bio-diesel, described by one reviewer, as smelling of "rancid popcorn".

The company has stated that it is researching the possibility of using algae as a raw material.
