= Manitowoc, Wisconsin =

Manitowoc
- City
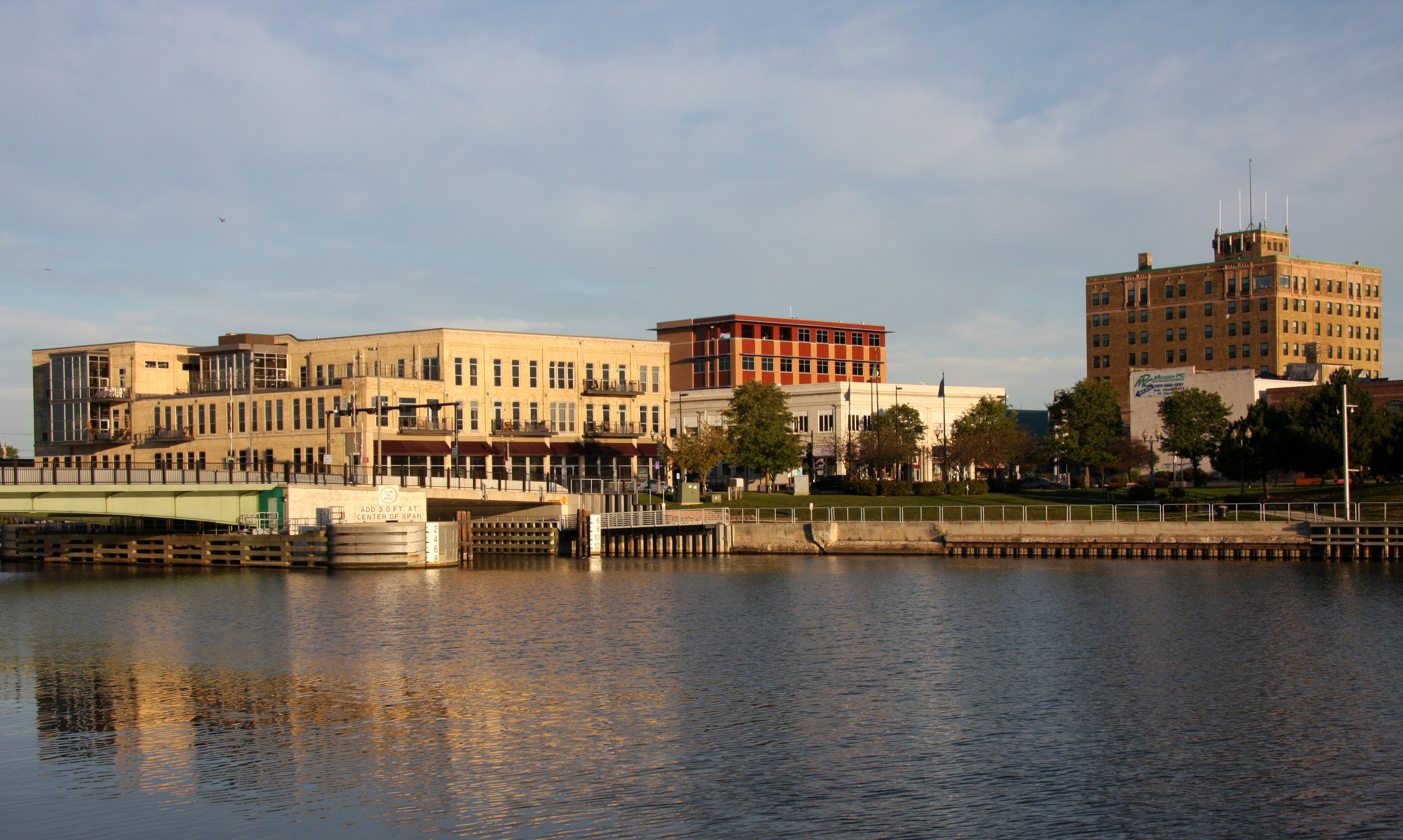
- Downtown Manitowoc on the Manitowoc River

- Seal
- Nicknames: Wisconsin's Maritime Capital, Clipper City, the Port City, Manty
- Location of Manitowoc in Manitowoc County, Wisconsin

- Location within Wisconsin Location within the United States
- Coordinates: 44°5′47″N 87°40′30″W
- Country: United States
- State: Wisconsin
- County: Manitowoc

Government
  - Mayor: Justin Nickels

Area
  - Total: 18.14 sq mi (46.98 km^{2})
  - Land: 17.78 sq mi (46.05 km^{2})
  - Water: 0.36 sq mi (0.93 km^{2})

Population (2020)
  - Total: 34,626
  - Density: 1,947/sq mi (751.9/km^{2})
- Time zone: UTC−6 (Central (CST))
  - Summer (DST): UTC−5 (CDT)
- ZIP Codes: 54220-54221, 54223
- Area code: 920
- FIPS code: 55-48500
- Public Transit: Maritime Metro Transit
- Website: www.manitowoc.org

Manitowoc (/ˈmænɪtəwɒk/ MAN-it-ə-wok) is a city in Manitowoc County, Wisconsin, United States, and its county seat. It is located on Lake Michigan at the mouth of the Manitowoc River. The population was 34,626 at the 2020 census.

== History ==
Purported to mean dwelling of the great spirit, Manitowoc derived its name from either the Ojibwe word manidoowaak(wag), meaning spirit-spawn(s), or manidoowaak(oog), meaning spirit-wood(s), or manidoowak(iin), meaning spirit-land(s). In the Menominee language, it is called Manetōwak, which means "place of the spirits". The Menominee ceded this land to the United States in the 1836 Treaty of the Cedars, following years of negotiations over how to accommodate the Oneida, Stockbridge-Munsee, and Brothertown peoples who had been removed from New York to Wisconsin. In 1838, an act of the Territorial Legislature separated Manitowoc County from Brown County, keeping the native name for the region.

The first Europeans in the area were French fur traders who arrived in 1673. The Northwest Fur Company established a trading post in 1795. In 1835, before the transfer of land from the Menominee Nation to the United States, President Andrew Jackson authorized land sales for the region, drawing the interest of land speculators. William Jones and Louis Fizette were the two first recorded buyers on August 3, 1835, with the majority of the land being procured by the Chicago firm Jones, King, & Co. Benjamin Jones, brother of William, took the Wisconsin property as his share and is considered the founder of Manitowoc. Early immigrant groups included Germans, Norwegians, British, Irish, and Canadians.

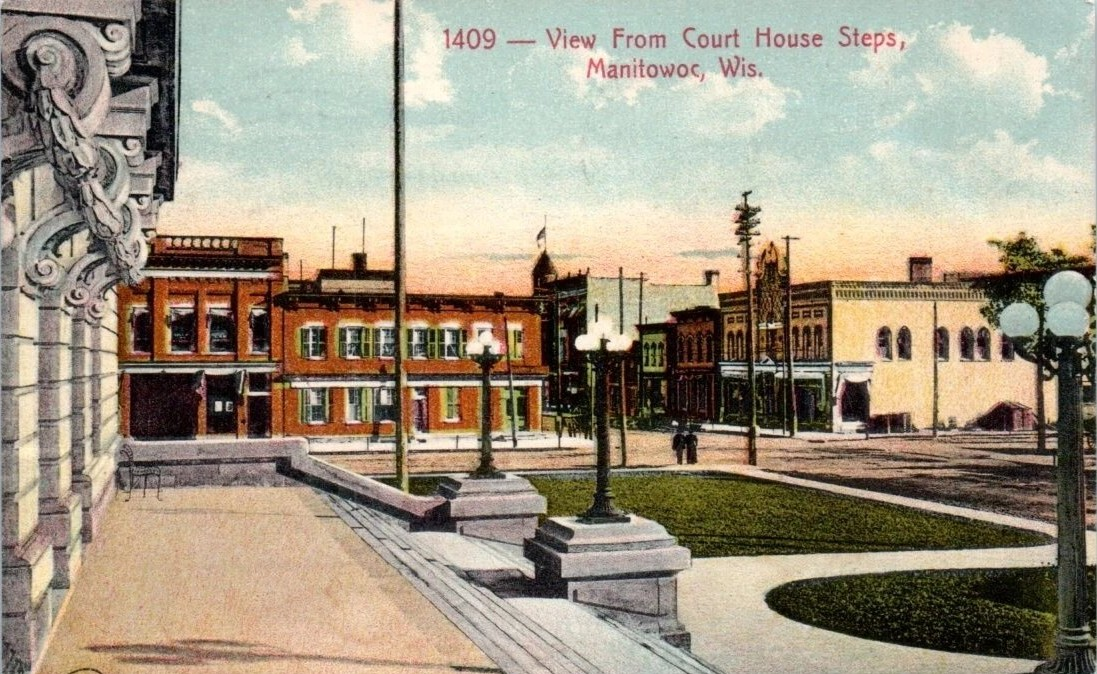
View from Court House Steps, Manitowoc, ca. 1907-15, published by E. A. Bishop Postcard Company

The first school in Manitowoc was held in the Jones warehouse, with S. M. Peake instructing the twelve children of the community. The first religious organization in the county, St. James' Episcopal Church, first met in 1841. Manitowoc was chartered as a village on March 6, 1851 and on March 12, 1870, was incorporated as a city. Manitowoc replaced neighboring Manitowoc Rapids as the county seat of Manitowoc County in 1853. The current Manitowoc County Courthouse was built in the city in 1906.

In 1847, Joseph Edwards built the first schooner in the area, the Citizen, a modest precursor to the shipbuilding industry that produced schooners and clippers used for fishing and trading in the Great Lakes and beyond the St. Lawrence River. In addition, landing craft, tankers and submarines became the local contributions to U.S. efforts in World War II.

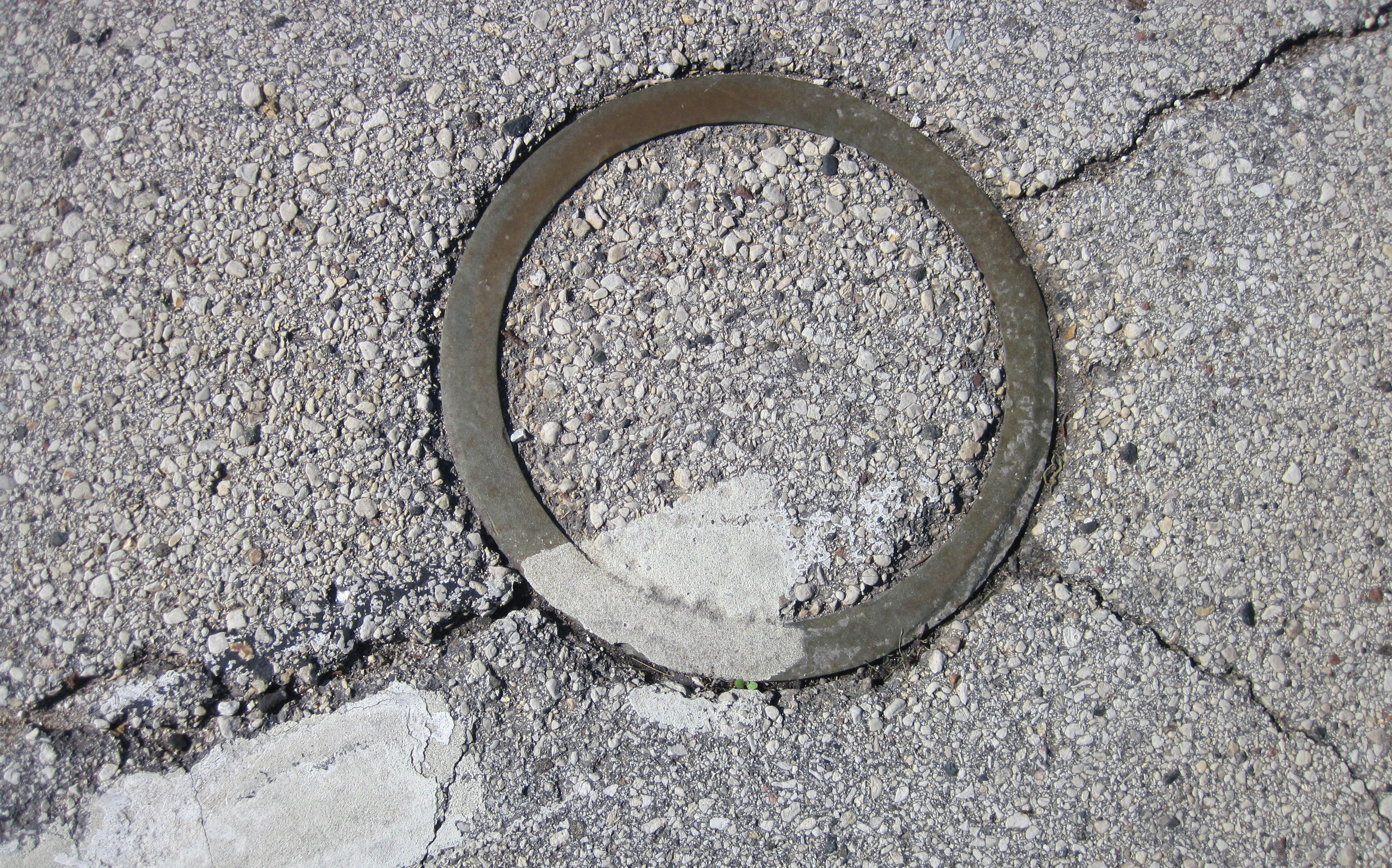
A metal ring marks the location of the Sputnik 4 impact.

On September 5, 1962, a 20-pound (9.1 kg) piece of the seven-ton Sputnik 4 crashed on North 8th Street. Sputnik 4 was a USSR satellite, part of the Sputnik program and a test-flight of the Vostok spacecraft that would be used for the first human spaceflight. It was launched on May 15, 1960.

A bug in the guidance system had pointed the capsule in the wrong direction, so instead of dropping into the atmosphere the satellite moved into a higher orbit. It re-entered the atmosphere on or about September 5, 1962. A cast was made from the original piece before the Soviets claimed it, and the cast was displayed at the Rahr West Art Museum. A customer in a nearby art gallery jokingly suggested that the city should hold a festival to celebrate the crash. The city held the first Sputnikfest in 2008, which was organized by the head of both museums.

Manitowoc was historically a sundown town that prohibited African Americans from staying overnight. In 1968, the policy forced a visiting Gwendolyn Brooks to stay at Holy Family College, just outside of Manitowoc, after a poetry reading.

Manitowoc is home to the Wisconsin Maritime Museum, and is one endpoint of the ferry route of the SS Badger, which connects U.S. Route 10 to Ludington, Michigan.

Since the late 1990s, several new shopping centers have opened in the city, mostly on the southwest side of the city along Interstate 43, including the new Harbor Town Center shopping complex. The downtown area has also seen a resurgence, with several new restaurants opening, and the recent announcement of new $100,000+ condominiums on the Manitowoc River, along with a completion of the riverwalk trail.

In December 2022, Manitowoc was designated Wisconsin's World War II Heritage City by the US National Park Service. In early 2023, an 87-unit apartment building south of the Manitowoc River was completed. Also in 2023, Mayor Justin Nickels stated he planned to continue adding amenities along the river. The bulk of the redevelopment in the city has been undertaken by the public/private partnership the Manitowoc County Economic Development Corporation.

== Geography ==
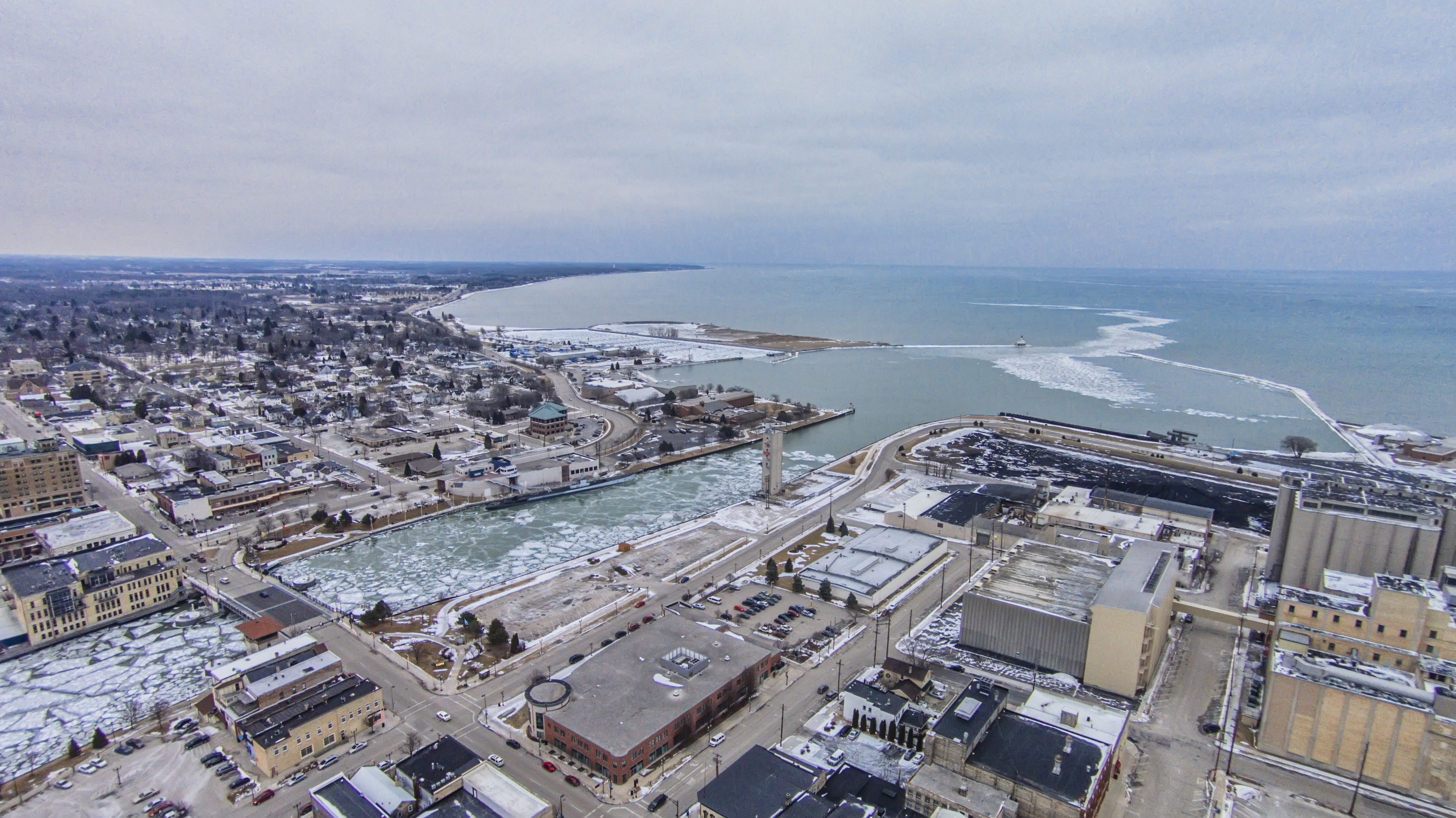
The Manitowoc River empties into Lake Michigan.

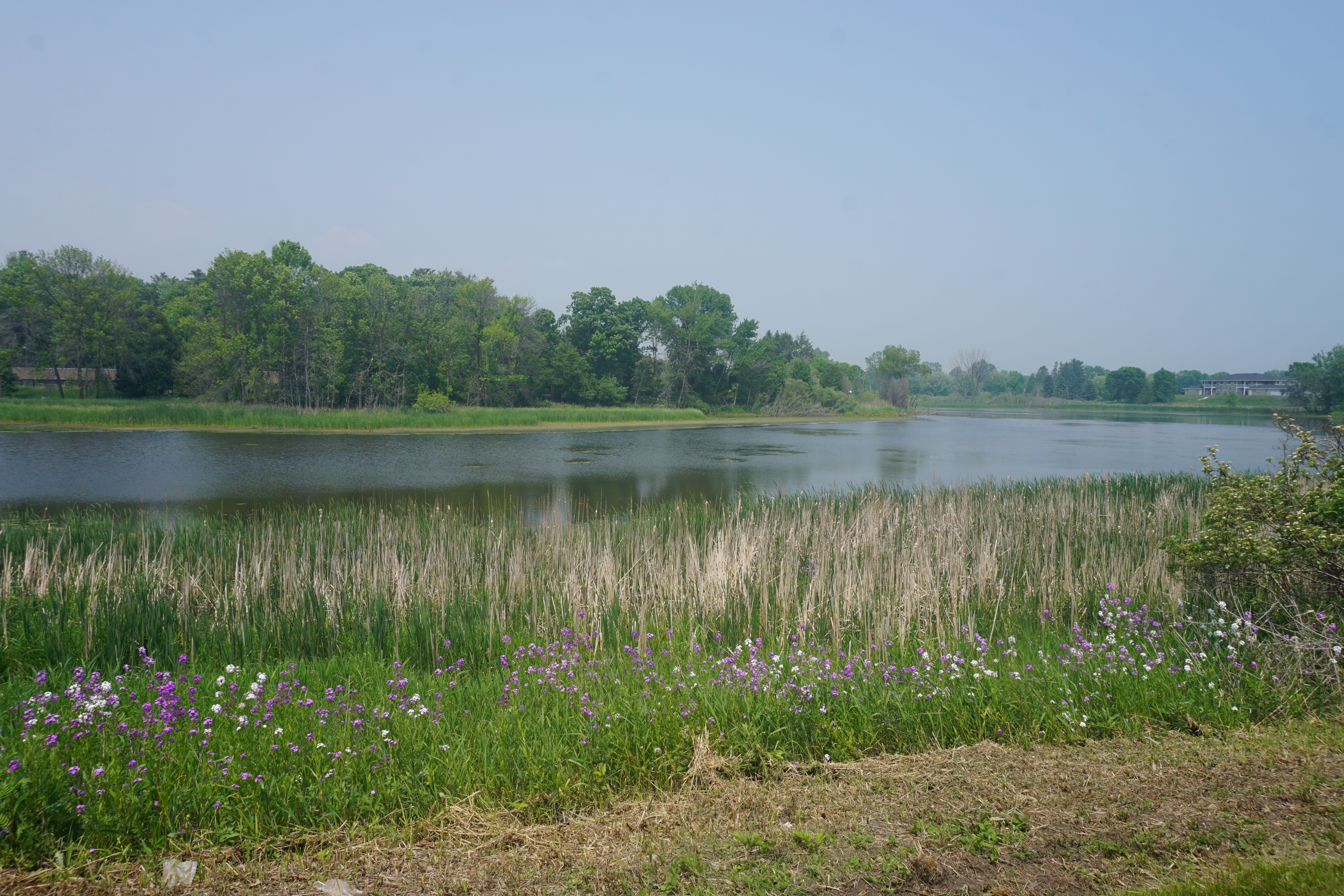
Little Manitowoc Slough

According to the United States Census Bureau, the city has a total area of 17.99 square miles (46.59 km^{2}), of which 17.63 square miles (45.66 km^{2}) is land and 0.36 square miles (0.93 km^{2}) is water.

The city is located at 44°5′47″N 87°40′30″W, on Lake Michigan at the mouth of the Manitowoc River.

The nearest other cities are Green Bay, 34 miles (55 km) away, Sheboygan 24 miles (39 km) away, Appleton 39 miles (63 km) away, and Milwaukee 74 miles (119 km) away. Together with Two Rivers and the surrounding towns, the Manitowoc micropolitan area was, according to the 2000 census, home to 52,197 people. The city forms the core of the United States Census Bureau's Manitowoc Micropolitan Statistical Area, which includes all of Manitowoc County (2000 population: 82,887).

=== Alverno ===
Alverno is a formerly unincorporated community located in the western parts of the city. Located slightly northwest of the I-43 Technology & Enterprise Business Park, the community contained some homes, a banquet place, and a railroad crossing on the northern side. The community is also the eastern terminus of a short county highway (County Road CS) at the intersection of Alverno Road and Custer Street.

=== Kellners Corners ===
Kellners Corners is also a formerly unincorporated community on the northwest side of the city at the intersection of Rapids Road (County Road R) and Menasha Avenue. This portion of Manitowoc is more residential with some businesses. Rapids Road was also the old alignment of US Highway 141 in Manitowoc until the completion of I-43 resulted in the portion of the old highway turned over to the county.

=== Climate ===
Manitowoc has a humid continental climate. Lake Michigan exerts a moderating effect on its climate compared to regions more inland, making temperatures warmer in the winter and cooler in the summer than most nearby cities. Manitowoc has a yearly average high of 52 °F (11 °C) and a yearly average low of 38.5 °F (4 °C). Manitowoc also has an extreme high and extreme low of 105 °F (41 °C) and −27 °F (−33 °C), respectively. The city receives an average of 31.17 in (792 mm) of precipitation every year, in the form of rain and snow, with rain being more prevalent in months April–November, and snow being more prevalent in months December–March. Precipitation is spread fairly evenly throughout the year, with the wettest month being August, with 3.58 in (91 mm) of precipitation, and the driest month being February, with 1.38 in (35 mm) of precipitation.

Climate data for Manitowoc, Wisconsin (1991–2020 normals, (Note: Mean monthly maxima and minima (i.e. the expected highest and lowest temperature readings at any point during the year or given month) calculated based on data at said location from 1991 to 2020.) extremes 1893–present)
Month	Jan	Feb	Mar	Apr	May	Jun	Jul	Aug	Sep	Oct	Nov	Dec	Year
Record high °F (°C)	59 (15)	59 (15)	79 (26)	90 (32)	95 (35)	103 (39)	105 (41)	100 (38)	97 (36)	89 (32)	76 (24)	64 (18)	105 (41)
Mean maximum °F (°C)	43.7 (6.5)	46.7 (8.2)	58.8 (14.9)	70.8 (21.6)	80.2 (26.8)	87.7 (30.9)	90.1 (32.3)	88.2 (31.2)	83.5 (28.6)	75.5 (24.2)	61.0 (16.1)	47.9 (8.8)	91.8 (33.2)
Mean daily maximum °F (°C)	26.5 (−3.1)	29.4 (−1.4)	38.5 (3.6)	50.0 (10.0)	61.5 (16.4)	71.6 (22.0)	76.9 (24.9)	75.7 (24.3)	68.6 (20.3)	56.0 (13.3)	43.0 (6.1)	31.8 (−0.1)	52.5 (11.4)
Daily mean °F (°C)	19.9 (−6.7)	22.6 (−5.2)	31.6 (−0.2)	42.2 (5.7)	52.8 (11.6)	63.0 (17.2)	68.6 (20.3)	68.0 (20.0)	60.8 (16.0)	49.0 (9.4)	36.7 (2.6)	25.8 (−3.4)	45.1 (7.3)
Mean daily minimum °F (°C)	13.4 (−10.3)	15.8 (−9.0)	24.6 (−4.1)	34.4 (1.3)	44.2 (6.8)	54.3 (12.4)	60.3 (15.7)	60.3 (15.7)	53.1 (11.7)	42.0 (5.6)	30.4 (−0.9)	19.8 (−6.8)	37.7 (3.2)
Mean minimum °F (°C)	−7.8 (−22.1)	−3.9 (−19.9)	6.0 (−14.4)	22.7 (−5.2)	33.8 (1.0)	42.8 (6.0)	51.3 (10.7)	51.0 (10.6)	39.8 (4.3)	29.0 (−1.7)	15.3 (−9.3)	0.2 (−17.7)	−12.2 (−24.6)
Record low °F (°C)	−27 (−33)	−29 (−34)	−18 (−28)	3 (−16)	21 (−6)	30 (−1)	37 (3)	38 (3)	26 (−3)	14 (−10)	−7 (−22)	−21 (−29)	−29 (−34)
Average precipitation inches (mm)	1.78 (45)	1.24 (31)	1.75 (44)	3.29 (84)	3.44 (87)	4.05 (103)	3.50 (89)	3.44 (87)	2.42 (61)	2.91 (74)	1.98 (50)	1.65 (42)	31.45 (799)
Average snowfall inches (cm)	7.8 (20)	10.0 (25)	3.2 (8.1)	1.4 (3.6)	0.0 (0.0)	0.0 (0.0)	0.0 (0.0)	0.0 (0.0)	0.0 (0.0)	0.2 (0.51)	0.9 (2.3)	11.1 (28)	34.6 (88)
Average extreme snow depth inches (cm)	6.6 (17)	6.7 (17)	4.7 (12)	.9 (2.3)	0 (0)	0 (0)	0 (0)	0 (0)	0 (0)	.1 (0.25)	.6 (1.5)	4.9 (12)	9.7 (25)
Average precipitation days (≥ 0.01 in)	8.3	6.6	7.0	9.4	10.5	10.2	9.8	9.0	8.6	9.5	8.0	7.2	104.1
Average snowy days (≥ 0.1 in)	3.7	4.6	2.1	0.7	0.0	0.0	0.0	0.0	0.0	0.1	0.9	3.4	15.5
Source: NOAA

== Demographics ==
Historical population
Census	Pop.	Note	%±
1860	3,059		—
1870	5,168		68.9%
1880	6,367		23.2%
1890	7,710		21.1%
1900	11,786		52.9%
1910	13,027		10.5%
1920	17,563		34.8%
1930	22,963		30.7%
1940	24,404		6.3%
1950	27,598		13.1%
1960	32,275		16.9%
1970	33,430		3.6%
1980	32,547		−2.6%
1990	32,520		−0.1%
2000	34,053		4.7%
2010	33,736		−0.9%
2020	34,626		2.6%
U.S. Decennial Census 2020

=== 2020 census ===
As of the 2020 census, Manitowoc had a population of 34,626 and a population density of 1,947.4 inhabitants per square mile (751.9/km^{2}). The median age was 42.6 years. 21.0% of residents were under the age of 18 and 21.7% were 65 years of age or older. For every 100 females there were 96.8 males, and for every 100 females age 18 and over there were 94.2 males age 18 and over.

99.4% of residents lived in urban areas, while 0.6% lived in rural areas.

There were 15,162 households in Manitowoc, of which 23.9% had children under the age of 18 living in them. Of all households, 40.6% were married-couple households, 22.2% were households with a male householder and no spouse or partner present, and 28.9% were households with a female householder and no spouse or partner present. About 37.1% of all households were made up of individuals and 16.4% had someone living alone who was 65 years of age or older.

There were 16,277 housing units at an average density of 915.4 per square mile (353.4/km^{2}), of which 6.9% were vacant. The homeowner vacancy rate was 1.5% and the rental vacancy rate was 7.6%.

Racial composition as of the 2020 census
Race	Number	Percent
White	28,722	82.9%
Black or African American	818	2.4%
American Indian and Alaska Native	245	0.7%
Asian	1,718	5.0%
Native Hawaiian and Other Pacific Islander	6	0.0%
Some other race	908	2.6%
Two or more races	2,209	6.4%
Hispanic or Latino (of any race)	2,507	7.2%

=== 2010 census ===
As of the census of 2010, there were 33,736 people, 14,623 households, and 8,600 families residing in the city. The population density was 1,913.6 inhabitants per square mile (738.8/km^{2}). There were 15,955 housing units at an average density of 905.0 per square mile (349.4/km^{2}). The racial makeup of the city was 89.9% White, 1.0% African American, 0.6% Native American, 4.6% Asian, 2.1% from other races, and 1.9% from two or more races. Hispanic or Latino people of any race were 5.0% of the population.

There were 14,623 households, of which 27.0% had children under the age of 18 living with them, 44.5% were married couples living together, 10.0% had a female householder with no husband present, 4.3% had a male householder with no wife present, and 41.2% were non-families. 35.4% of all households were made up of individuals, and 14.7% had someone living alone who was 65 years of age or older. The average household size was 2.24 and the average family size was 2.91.

The median age in the city was 41.7 years. 22.2% of residents were under the age of 18; 8.1% were between the ages of 18 and 24; 23.7% were from 25 to 44; 27.2% were from 45 to 64; and 18.8% were 65 years of age or older. The gender makeup of the city was 48.2% male and 51.8% female.

=== 2000 census ===
As of the census of 2000, there were 34,053 people, 14,235 households, and 8,811 families residing in the city. The population density was 2,018.8 people per square mile (779.4/km^{2}). There were 15,007 housing units at an average density of 889.7 per square mile (343.5/km^{2}). The racial makeup of the city was 93.13% White, 0.59% Black or African American, 0.55% Native American, 3.77% Asian, 0.07% Pacific Islander, 0.90% from other races, and 0.99% from two or more races. 2.52% of the population were Hispanic or Latino of any race.

There were 14,235 households, out of which 28.6% had children under the age of 18 living with them, 49.0% were married couples living together, 9.1% had a female householder with no husband present, and 38.1% were non-families. 32.5% of all households were made up of individuals, and 14.6% had someone living alone who was 65 years of age or older. The average household size was 2.32 and the average family size was 2.96.

In the city, the population was spread out, with 24.1% under the age of 18, 8.2% from 18 to 24, 27.9% from 25 to 44, 21.4% from 45 to 64, and 18.4% who were 65 years of age or older. The median age was 39 years. For every 100 females, there were 93.9 males. For every 100 females age 18 and over, there were 90.9 males.

The median income for a household in the city was $38,203, and the median income for a family was $47,635. Males had a median income of $35,176 versus $22,918 for females. The per capita income for the city was $19,954. About 5.0% of families and 7.9% of the population were below the poverty line, including 11.7% of those under age 18 and 7.5% of those age 65 or over.

=== Religion ===
The Franciscan Sisters of Christian Charity have their mother house in Manitowoc. In 2005, the Roman Catholic Diocese of Green Bay merged several Catholic parishes in the city into one parish, St. Francis of Assisi Catholic Church, with a four-man pastoral team led by Father Dan Felton. In 2005, the Herald Times Reporter reported that the city has roughly 22,000 Roman Catholics.

The Wisconsin Evangelical Lutheran Synod is a significant Christian synod in the city with four large churches and Manitowoc Lutheran High School. Two additional Wisconsin Synod churches are outside the city limits, with a Manitowoc address.

St. James' is an historic Episcopal church in the city.

The Church of Jesus Christ of Latter-day Saints has a meetinghouse in Manitowoc.

== Economy ==
The Manitowoc Company, founded in Manitowoc but now headquartered in Milwaukee, grew out of the shipbuilding industry. It is a diversified manufacturer with interests in the Manitowoc Cranes construction and food service industries. The acquisition of Grove Crane resulted in the relocation of crane manufacturing to Shady Grove, Pennsylvania, ending its crane manufacturing operations in Manitowoc.

The city is the world headquarters of Lakeside Foods Company and Bio-Blend Fuels. Burger Boat Company, a yacht builder, is located in Manitowoc and produces approximately 2–3 yachts each year. Other significant employers include Baileigh Industrial, a manufacturer of metal fabrication and woodworking machines; Orion Energy Systems, specializing in energy-efficient commercial fluorescent and solar lighting; and Manitowoc Ice, a globally known commercial ice machine company, started in 1964 after The Manitowoc Equipment Works purchased a Minneapolis ice machine company named Kodiak. In 2022, Manitowoc Ice was acquired by Pentair, but the company continues to manufacture and distribute from the Manitowoc location.

== Arts and culture ==
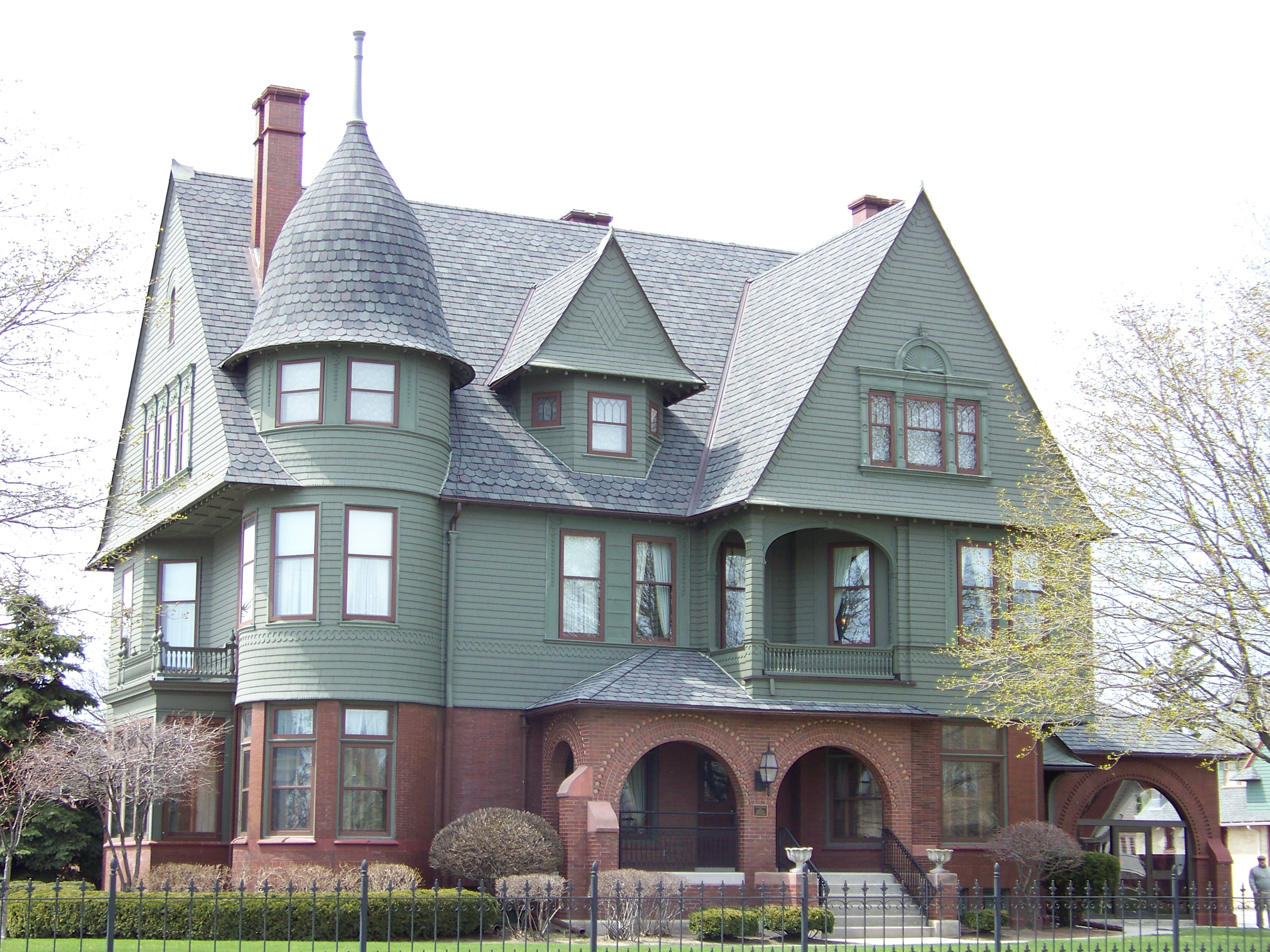
Rahr West Art Museum

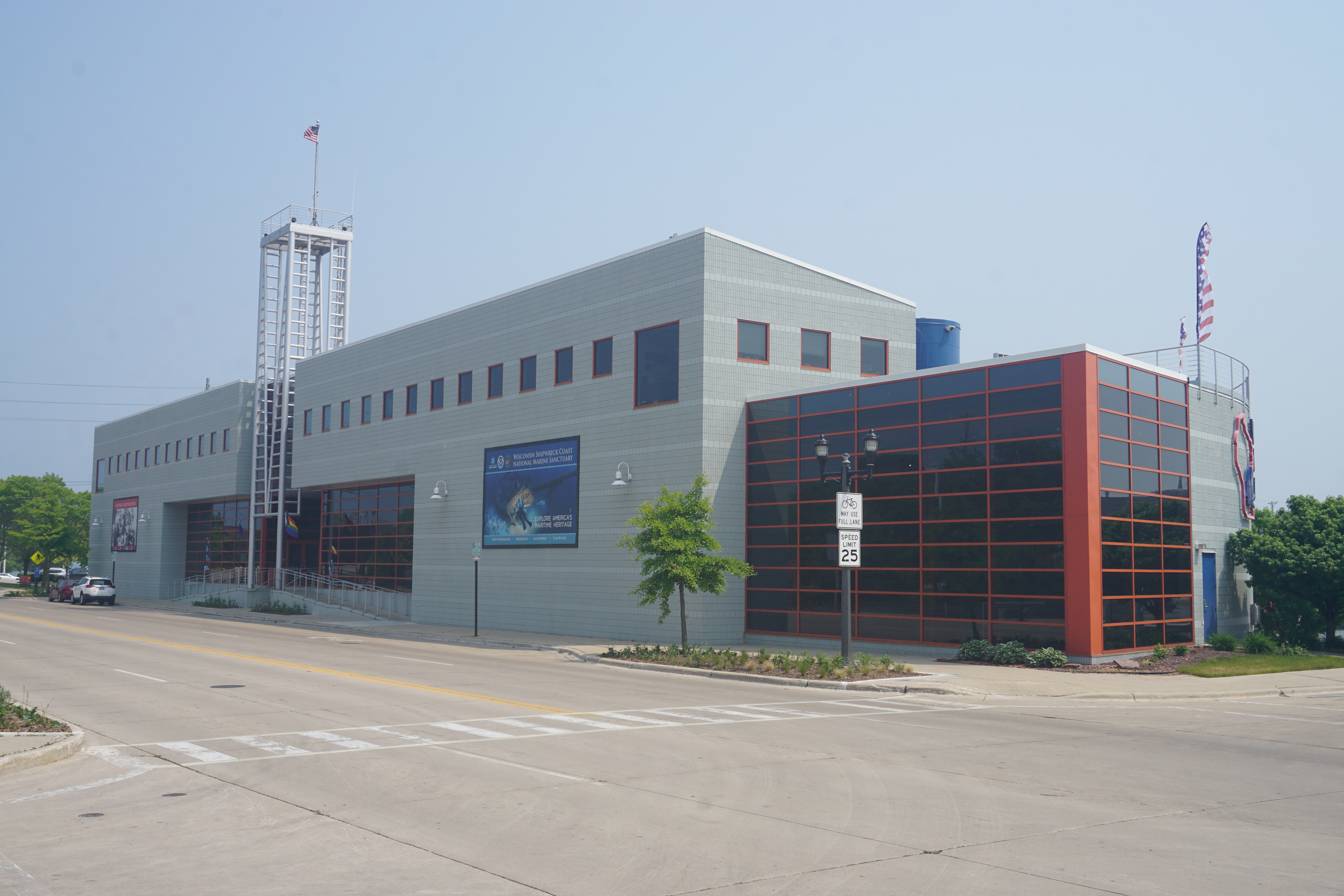
Wisconsin Maritime Museum

The Rahr West Art Museum is housed in a 19th-century mansion near downtown Manitowoc. Donated by the Rahr family in 1941 for use as a community civic art center, it has been since expanded numerous times. The Museum currently houses art ranging from the 15th–21st centuries, with paintings, sculptures, and a preserved Victorian home in its possession. The Eighth Street Historic District encompasses the city's historic downtown and includes many buildings from the 1850s-1930s, including the beaux-arts style Manitowoc County Courthouse.

The Wisconsin Shipwreck Coast National Marine Sanctuary, established in 2021 and the site of a large number of historically significant shipwrecks, lies in the waters of Lake Michigan off Manitowoc. The Wisconsin Maritime Museum was founded in 1970 as the Manitowoc Submarine Memorial Association, and has since grown to be one of the largest nautical museums in the country; it has recently been granted affiliation status with the Smithsonian. It has over 60,000 sq ft (5,600 m^{2}) of interactive and standing exhibits exploring maritime history with a particular emphasis on the Great Lakes. Perhaps the Museum's crown jewel however is the World War II era USS Cobia, an authentic combat submarine similar to those built in Manitowoc during the war. There are daily tours of the vessel, which is moored in Manitowoc's harbor, allowing visitors a look at Manitowoc's role in the war and building 28 submarines for the U.S. Navy.

The Lincoln Park Zoo is a year-round zoo and is part of the Manitowoc Parks and Recreation Department. The Lincoln Park Zoo has tours and educational programs available for small and large groups.

== Government ==
The city government consists of a mayor and a city council, with ten members elected from single member districts. The current mayor is Justin Nickels.

== Education ==
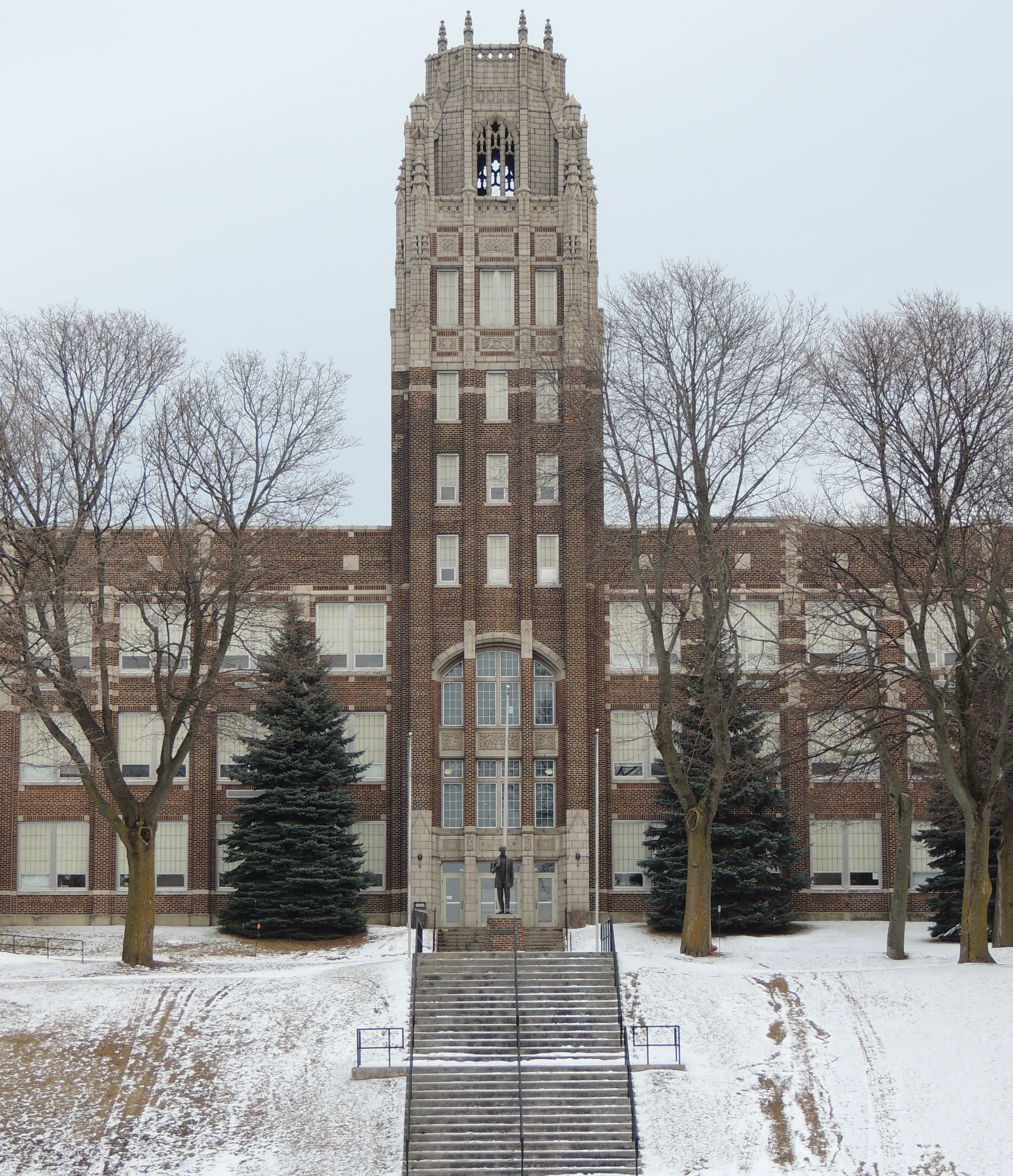
Lincoln High School

Public education in Manitowoc is administered by the Manitowoc Public School District. High schools within the city include the public Lincoln High School, as well as the private Roncalli High School and Manitowoc Lutheran High School.

The city has two colleges and universities within its limits: the University of Wisconsin–Green Bay, Manitowoc Campus and Lakeshore Technical College. Formerly, Holy Family College was a private liberal arts college in the city from 1935 to 2020.

== Media ==
=== Newspapers ===
- Manitowoc Herald Times Reporter — daily newspaper owned by Gannett Newspapers
- Lakeshore Chronicle — printed on Sundays and Wednesdays only, also owned by Gannett Newspapers

=== Television and radio ===
Manitowoc is part of the Green Bay television market, although it is common for residents to receive stations over-the-air from Milwaukee, and across the lake from the Grand Rapids and Traverse City/Cadillac markets. No television stations originate from Manitowoc, and the only full-time presence of Green Bay stations in the city are remote-operated weather cameras and WFRV-TV featuring some Herald Times Reporter content in newscasts as part of a promotional agreement with Gannett's northeastern Wisconsin newspapers.

Comcast holds the city's cable franchise, inherited from the company's earlier purchase of Jones Intercable, and the city has the only presence of Comcast or Xfinity in the state of Wisconsin.

Manitowoc is classed as part of Nielsen Audio's Sheboygan/Manitowoc radio market and combined with Two Rivers, and stations from both Sheboygan and Green Bay are easily heard in the area. Since 2017, Seehafer Broadcasting has owned all six commercial radio stations broadcasting towards and licensed to Manitowoc and Two Rivers (several other stations are licensed to Manitowoc County communities, but they all instead target Green Bay and the Fox Cities).

=== Fictional characters ===
Phil Coulson of the Marvel Cinematic Universe stated he was born here in the thirteenth episode of the second season of the television show Agents of S.H.I.E.L.D.

Paige Morgan in the movie The Prince & Me is from Manitowoc.

== Transportation ==
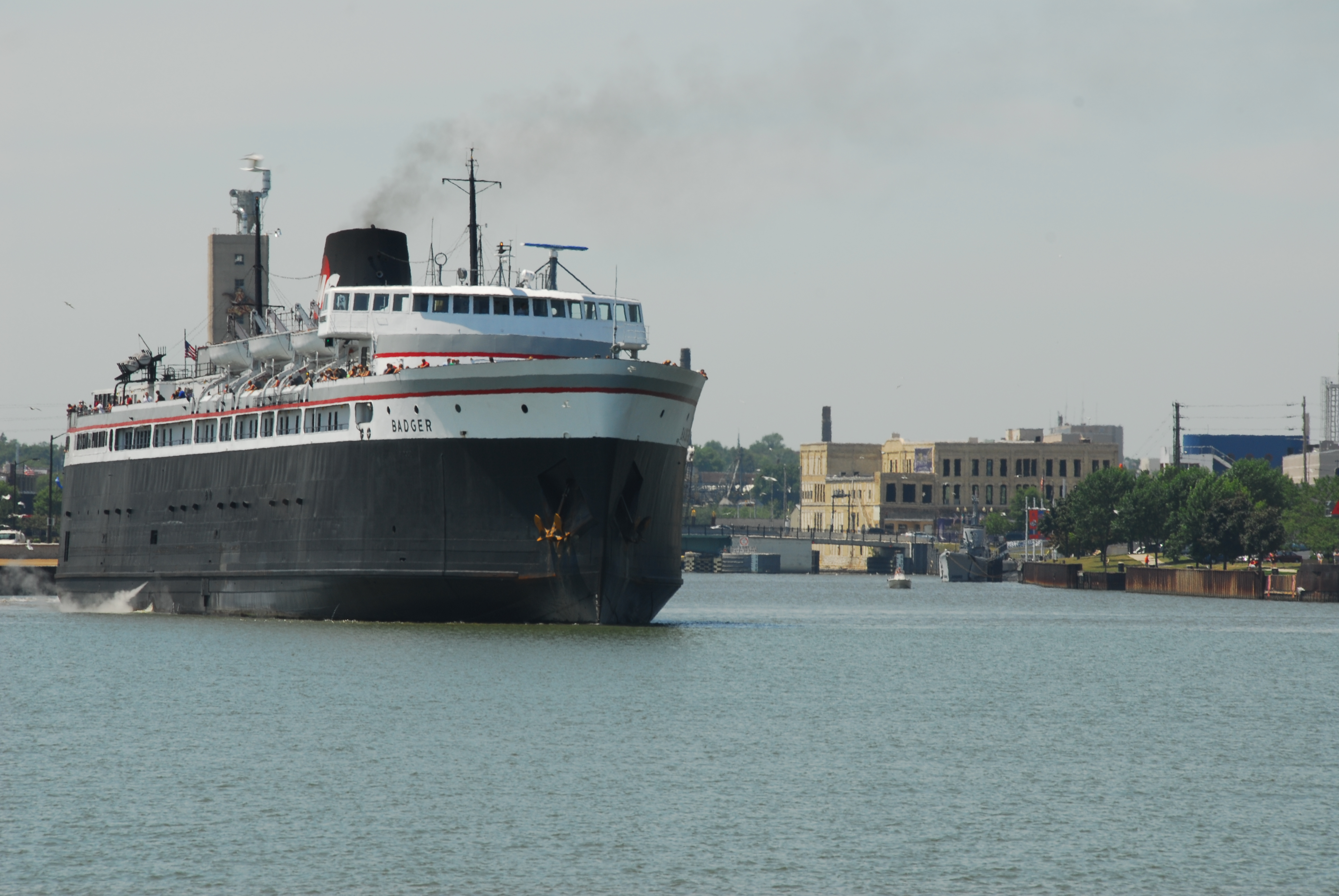
S.S. Badger leaving port in Manitowoc

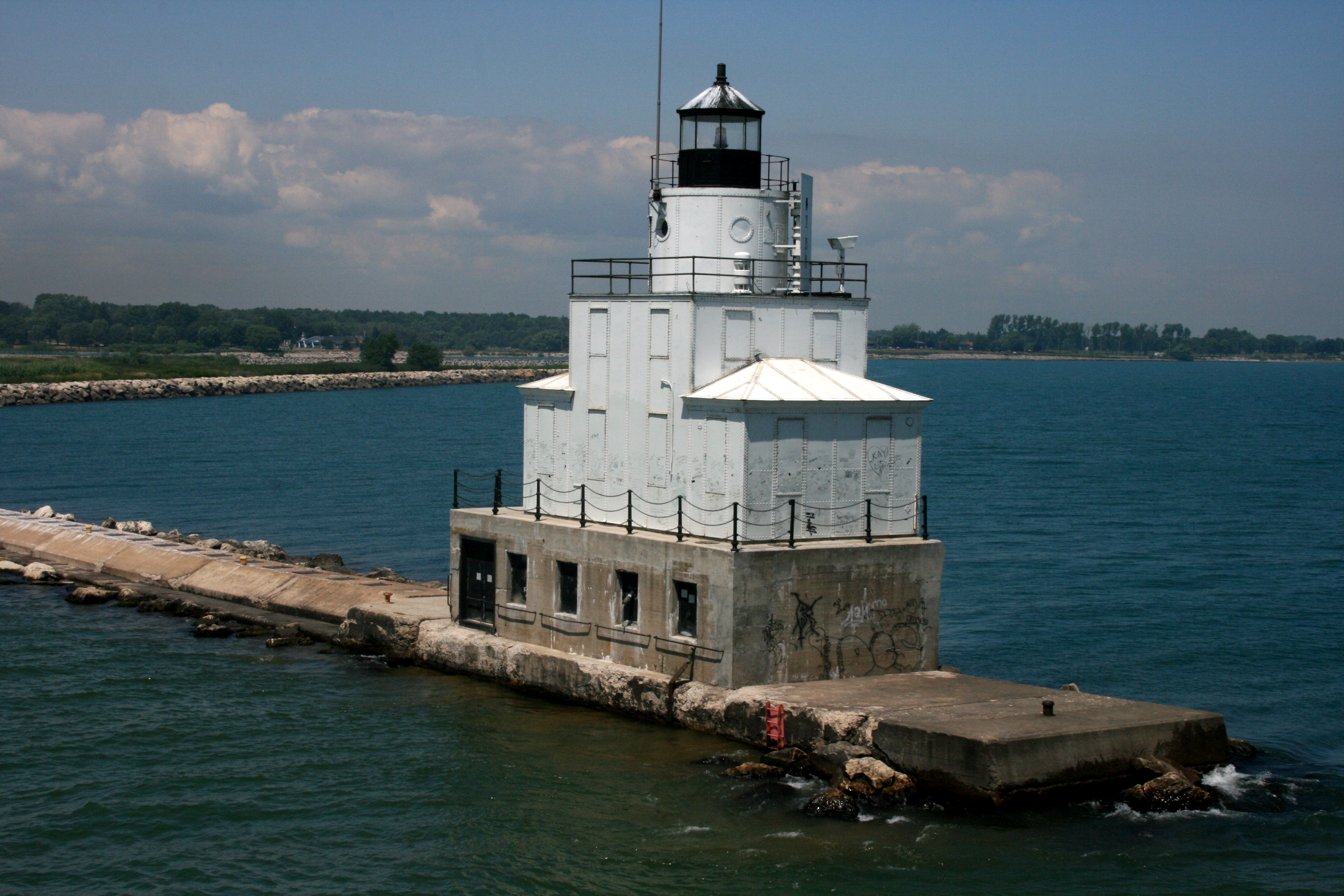
Manitowoc Breakwater Light

Public transportation in the city been provided by Maritime Metro Transit since 1978, covering both Manitowoc and Two Rivers. MMT currently has a fleet of 12 buses serving over 40 stops on eight routes. Manitowoc County Airport (KMTW) serves the city and surrounding communities.

Manitowoc is the western port for the S.S. Badger ferry, that crosses Lake Michigan to Ludington, Michigan. The ferry ride comprises part of the route of U.S. Route 10. The Manitowoc Mariners Trail is a 5.5-mile (8.9 km) paved recreational trail running along the shore of Lake Michigan between the cities of Manitowoc and Two Rivers, Wisconsin.

=== Highways ===
- I-43 northbound connects to Green Bay and southbound connects to Sheboygan, Milwaukee, and Beloit.
- US 10 travels east across Lake Michigan via the SS Badger to Ludington, Michigan, and west to Appleton.
- US 151 southbound connects to Chilton and Fond Du Lac.
- WIS 42 travels southward to Howards Grove and Sheboygan and northward to Sturgeon Bay, Two Rivers and Kewaunee.

== Health care ==
The Manitowoc area is served by two main medical groups: Holy Family Memorial, with an inpatient medical center and more than 15 clinics in the county; and Aurora Health Care, with one main campus in Two Rivers and several dozen health clinics throughout the county.

== Notable people ==
- James Sibree Anderson, Wisconsin State Representative
- Thomas F. Anderson (1911–1991), biophysical chemist and geneticist
- Henry Baetz, Treasurer of Wisconsin
- Mike Bare, Wisconsin State Representative, born in Manitowoc
- George W. Barker, U.S. Marshal for Vermont, Judge of Manitowoc County, Wisconsin
- John A. Bentley, Wisconsin State Senator
- Garey Bies, Wisconsin State Representative, born in Manitowoc
- Dale Bolle, Wisconsin State Representative
- Guila Bustabo, violinist, born in Manitowoc
- Matt Christman, co-host of Chapo Trap House
- Gerald W. Clusen, U.S. Navy admiral
- Charles Daellenbach, musician, founder of Grammy Award-winning Canadian Brass, graduate of Lincoln High School
- Benjamin W. Diederich, Wisconsin State Representative
- John C. Egan, Squadron Commander in the 100th Bomb Group during World War II
- E. H. Ellis, former mayor of Green Bay, Wisconsin
- Charles E. Estabrook, Wisconsin Attorney General
- Peter Fanta, U.S. Navy admiral
- Amy Fote, principal dancer with Houston ballet, born and raised in Manitowoc
- Doug Free, offensive lineman for NFL Dallas Cowboys, 2002 graduate of Lincoln High
- Raymond Gorte, Member of the National Academy of Engineering
- Romy Gosz, polka musician, inducted into the International Polka Hall of Fame and Wisconsin Polka Hall of Fame
- Carl Hansen, Wisconsin State Representative
- Donald K. Helgeson, Wisconsin State Representative
- William H. Hemschemeyer, Wisconsin State Representative
- Solomon S. Huebner, college professor
- Peter Johnston, Wisconsin State Representative
- Edgar A. Jonas, U.S. Representative from Illinois
- M. W. Kalaher, Wisconsin State Representative
- Eugene S. Kaufman, Wisconsin State Representative
- Norman Knudson, Wisconsin State Senator
- Erik Kowalski, musician
- Ardis Krainik, opera singer (1928–1997)
- Francis J. Lallensack, Wisconsin State Representative
- Charles Francis Laseron (1887–1959), naturalist and malacologist
- Lawrence W. Ledvina, Wisconsin State Representative and lawyer
- Frederic Ives Lord, airman (Spanish Civil War)
- Stoney McGlynn, MLB player
- Andrew Miller, Medal of Honor recipient
- Robert Naumann, Wisconsin State Representative
- Garth Neustadter, Emmy Award-winning composer and multi-instrumentalist
- William Henry Phipps, Wisconsin State Senator
- Franz Pieper, President of Lutheran Church–Missouri Synod
- Reinhardt Rahr, Wisconsin State Representative
- Alexander W. Randall, 1886–1889 Postmaster General of United States
- Samuel W. Randolph, Wisconsin State Senator
- Joseph Rankin, U.S. Representative 1883–1886
- Karl L. Rankin, U.S. diplomat
- Paula J. Raschke-Lind, Illinois State Representative
- George Reed, politician
- Angus B. Rothwell, Superintendent of Public Instruction
- Charles Eberhard Salomon, Union Army general
- Frederick Salomon, Union Army general
- Henry Schadeberg, U.S. Representative
- Emil P. Scheibe, Wisconsin State Representative
- Raymond J. Scheuer, Wisconsin State Assembyman
- Carl Schmidt, Wisconsin State Senator
- Charles Schuette, Wisconsin State Representative
- John Schuette, Wisconsin State Senator
- William L. Schultz, circus performer, teacher, writer
- Wilbur Schwandt, songwriter, "Dream a Little Dream of Me"
- Reuben D. Smart, Wisconsin State Representative
- Thorvald Solberg (1852–1949), first Register of Copyrights in United States Copyright Office
- Merta Sterling, actress
- Sheri Swokowski, Army officer and transgender rights activist
- Robert Tills, United States Navy, killed in Philippines during World War II
- Susan Bowers Vergeront, Wisconsin State Representative
- Joseph Vilas, Wisconsin State Senator
- Henry Vits, Wisconsin State Representative
- Otto A. Vogel, Wisconsin State Representative
- R. T. Wallen, artist, born in Manitowoc and attended Lincoln High School
- Pat Willis, judge, born in Manitowoc
- Joseph Willott, Jr., Wisconsin State Representative
- Walter Wittman, Wisconsin State Representative
- Francis A. Yindra, Wisconsin State Senator
- Bob Ziegelbauer, Wisconsin State Representative and current County Executive

== Sister city ==
Manitowoc has one sister city:

- Kamogawa, Japan

== See also ==
- List of sundown towns in the United States
