= Maritime Metro Transit =

Public transit in Wisconsin

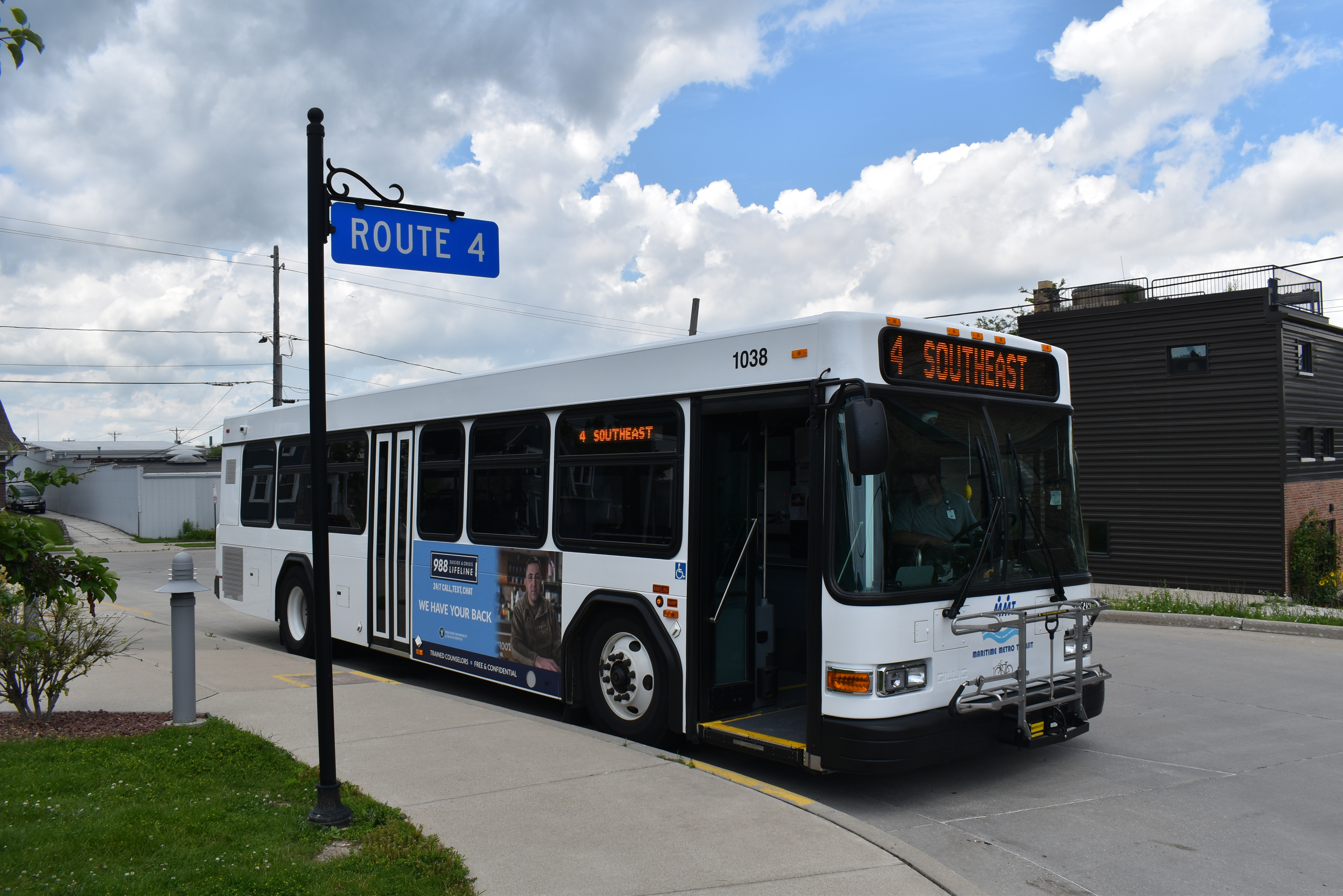
- A bus at the transit center in July 2024
- Founded: 1978
- Headquarters: 915 South 11th St Manitowoc, Wisconsin
- Locale: Manitowoc, WI
- Service type: Bus service, paratransit
- Routes: 7
- Fleet: 26
- Annual ridership: 229,836 (2022)
- Website: https://www.manitowoc.org/433/Maritime-Metro-Transit

Maritime Metro Transit is the public transportation system in Manitowoc, Wisconsin. It is owned and operated by the city of Manitowoc.

== History ==
Public transit in Manitowoc started in 1902 with a streetcar system operated by Manitowoc & Northern Traction Company. In 1922, Wisconsin Public Service Company took over operations and introduced the first buses. By 1927, the streetcars were put out of service and replaced entirely with buses. Two more private companies ran the bus system until January 1978, when the city of Manitowoc assumed operations. Originally the system was called Manitowoc Transit System, but the name was changed to Maritime Metro Transit in 1999.

== Services ==
The transit system operates seven routes:

- Route 1: Two Rivers
- Route 2: Northeast Loop
- Route 3: Southwest Loop
- Route 4: Southeast loop
- Route 5: West Loop
- Route 6A: Northcentral Loop
- Route 6B: Northwest Loop

Routes generally run 5 am to 8 pm Monday through Friday and 9 am to 4 pm on Saturday. There is no service on Sunday. Five of the seven routes operate from the Maritime Metro Transit Center in downtown Manitowoc.

== Maritime Metro Transit Center ==
The Maritime Metro Transit Center, located at 915 South 11th St, is the primary transfer hub of Maritime Metro Transit. The facility was opened on October 24, 2012, replacing a former bank drive-thru, used since 1998. The transfer center serves 5 of the 7 routes with buses departing on the hour or half hour.

== Ridership ==
	Ridership	Change over previous year
2014	340,764	n/a
2015	342,667	▲0.56%
2016	332,871	▼2.86%
2017	317,656	▼4.57%
2018	313,936	▼1.17%
2019	317,573	▲1.16%
2020	255,586	▼19.52%
2021	187,815	▼26.52%
2022	229,836	▲22.37%
2023	225,587	▼1.85%

The system reached its peak ridership in 1983, with a total of 401,925 rides.

== See also ==
- Shoreline Metro
- SS Badger
- List of bus transit systems in the United States
