= Franciscan Sisters of Christian Charity =

American congregation of Religious Sisters

The Franciscan Sisters of Christian Charity are a Congregation of Roman Catholic apostolic religious women. The congregation was founded in 1869 in Manitowoc, Wisconsin in the Roman Catholic Archdiocese of Milwaukee, later part of the Roman Catholic Diocese of Green Bay. The sisters have active apostolates in education, health care, spiritual direction, and other community ministries. As of 2021, there are 188 sisters in the community. The FSCC is a member of the Council of Major Superiors of Women Religious, an organization which represents women religious in the United States.

== History ==
The origin of the Franciscan Sisters of Christian Charity dates back to 1854 when Father Ambrose Oschwald led a party of German immigrants from Baden to the United States to establish a Catholic community in America. They founded St. Nazianz, Wisconsin, August 27, 1854, named after St. Gregory of Nazianzus.

In 1865, newly ordained Rev. Joseph Fessler was assigned to Immaculate Conception Parish, Clarks Mills. Fessler was one of the original members of the community at St. Nazianz. In June 1866, he brought Teresa Gramlich, of St. Nazianz, to Clarks Mills to begin teaching catechism classes to the children of Immaculate Conception Parish.

In 1866, Rev Joseph Albrecht, a friend of Fr. Ambrose Oshwald, of the Congregation of the Missionaries of the Precious Blood from Ohio visited St. Nazianz in Wisconsin with fifteen sisters of the Precious Blood congregation. When Fr. Albrecht's group left for Minnesota in September 1867, three sisters of the Sisters of the Precious Blood, Sisters Mary Ann Graf, Josepha Thoenig and Rosa Wahl remained in St. Nazianz. These three sisters joined Teresa Gramlich in Clarks Mills in 1867 and began their postulancy for a new religious community forming under the direction of Fr. Fessler. Teresa, and Sisters Mary Ann and Rosa were then sent to Milwaukee to study with the School Sisters of Notre Dame under the direction of Mother Caroline, the founder of the School Sisters of Notre Dame in America.

In June 1868, Fr. Fessler was transferred to St. Boniface in Manitowoc, Wisconsin as pastor and he made a request to Bishop John Henni of Milwaukee to approve a request for the sisters to form a Franciscan religious congregation. Bishop John Henni approved the request in 1869. Sisters Mary Ann, Josepha, and Rosa along with Teresa moved to Manitowoc where a combination convent and school building had been constructed for the congregation. On November 4, 1869, they began their pre-novitiate retreat and were joined by Sophia Fessler, Fr. Fessler's younger sister. November 9, 1869, the Founders' Day of the Franciscan Sisters of Christian Charity, those five women were received into the Third Order Regular of St. Francis. They received their religious names: Josepha Theonig became Sr. Maria Coletta; Mary Ann Graf became Sr. Mary Hyacintha; Teresa Gramlich became Sr. Maria Gabriela; Sophia Fessler became Sr. Mary Seraphica; and Rosa Wahl became Sr. Mary Odelia, and it was she who was the first superior of the little community.

Fr. Fessler purchased a property on Silver Lake, near Manitowoc, Wisconsin for the communities motherhouse. The cornerstone was laid July 23, 1873; and the following year, the motherhouse was dedicated.

In 1875, twenty-seven Poor School Sisters of St. Francis from Germany were welcomed to the Motherhouse. The two communities were brought together despite natural tensions between the Americans and German sisters. In 1881, the Motherhouse at Silver Lake caught fire and the building was destroyed. This brought a new opportunity for the two communities to build together and start again. In 1885, with a hundred Religious Sisters and thirty-five Postulants, Archbishop Michael Heiss approved the Community of the Franciscan Sisters of Christian Charity the status of a Diocesan Institute and approved new Constitutions.

On January 22, 1962, Pope John XXII gave definitive approval for The Franciscan Sisters of Christian Charity as a pontifical Congregation.

== Ministries ==
As of 2021, the congregation sponsors health care and educational ministries through the non-profit Franciscan Sisters of Christian Charity Sponsored Ministries, (formerly FSCC HealthCare Ministry), a not-for-profit organization headquartered in Manitowoc, Wisconsin. The not-for-profit owns and operates a health care services with hospitals and long-term care facilities in Nebraska, Ohio and Wisconsin. It describes its mission as being "to carry out the commitment of the Sponsor to the healing and educational mission of the Catholic Church through the provision of quality health care and educational services", with elements of this mission including "managing change, ensuring stewardship of resources and integrating mission and values". Components include:

- Holy Family Memorial, a health care system, in Manitowoc, Wisconsin
- Genesis HealthCare System in Zanesville, Ohio
- Franciscan Healthcare System in West Point, Nebraska
- St. Paul Elder Services in Kaukauna, Wisconsin
- McCormick Home in Green Bay, Wisconsin

Today, the Congregation serves the Church in three archdioceses (Milwaukee, Omaha, St. Louis) and in six dioceses (Columbus, Green Bay, Lincoln, Marquette, Phoenix, Tucson, and Steubenville).

- Arizona
  - Phoenix - St. Peter Indian Mission on the Gila River Indian Reservation
  - Sierra Vista - St. Andrew Parish
  - Tucson - San Xavier Mission - Christo Rey San Miguel High School
- Italy
  - Vatican City - General Synod of Bishops
- Michigan
  - Houghton, MI - St. Albert Campus Ministry at Michigan Tech
  - L'anse - Sacred Heart Catholic School
- Missouri
  - St. Louis - Hospitality house
- Nebraska
  - Imperial - St. Patrick's Parish and Grant Deanery.
  - Omaha - Pope Paul VI Institute - Center for NaProEthics.
  - West Point - Catholic School and Franciscan Care Services
- Ohio
  - Cambridge - St. Benedict School and Christ Our Light Parish
  - Zanesville - Genesis HealthCare System (sponsored-ministry)
- Wisconsin
  - Champion - Our Lady of Good Help Shrine
  - Green Bay - McCormick Home, Holy Family School at St. Agnes Parish
  - Manitowoc - Holy Family Memorial, Holy Family Conservatory of Music
  - Kaukauna - St. Paul Elder Services

== Notable members ==
- Mary Aquinas Kinskey - teacher and aviator
