= List of shipwrecks in Lake Michigan =

Map of the Great Lakes, with Lake Michigan in darker blue

Out of the five Great Lakes, Lake Michigan, the only one entirely within the borders of the United States, contains the largest number of shipwrecks, thanks to its past as a major navigational artery. Out of the known shipwrecks in the lake, 69 of them are listed on the National Register of Historic Places, within the waters of Michigan, Wisconsin, and Indiana.

== Shipwrecks ==
Ship	Ship type	Build date	Sunk date	Flag	Fate	Coordinates	Image	Sources
Abiah	Wooden schooner	1847	1854	United States	Capsized in a squall on 8 September 1854, while bound from Chicago, Illinois, for Oconto, Wisconsin. Sank near Sheboygan, Wisconsin, while under tow. Wreck located in 2019, and listed on the National Register of Historic Places in 2022.	43.801833°N 87.438°W		
A. D. Patchin	Wooden paddle steamer	1846	1850	United States	Stranded on Ile Aux Galets on 17 September 1850. Grounding spurred the construction of the Ile Aux Galets Light. Wreck tentatively located in 2014.	45.669308°N 85.18688°W		
Adrian Iselin	Steel canaller	1914	1968	United States	Sunk as a breakwater in Frankfort, Michigan, in 1968, with Tampico.	44.629527°N 86.226891°W		
Adriatic	Wooden schooner-barge	1889	1934	United States	Tied up and abandoned at a dock in Sturgeon Bay, Wisconsin, in 1927. Burned to the waterline and sank in 1934.	44.836722°N 87.383444°W		
Algosteel	Steel bulk freighter	1907	1967	Canada	Sunk as a breakwater in Burns Harbor, Indiana, in 1967.	41.649339°N 87.130967°W		
Alice E. Wilds	Wooden steam barge	1883	1892	United States	On 12 June 1892, while bound from Chicago, for Escanaba, Michigan, with a cargo of lumber, Alive E. Wilds encountered a thick fog and was rammed and sunk by the steamer Douglas off Milwaukee, Wisconsin, without loss of life. Wreck located in 2015.	43.144858°N 87.459551°W		
Alleghany	Wooden steamship	1849	1855	United States	Ran aground after losing power in a gale at North Point, near Milwaukee, in October 1855, while headed for that port.	42.986°N 87.8628°W		
Alpena	Wooden paddle steamer	1866	1880	United States	Left Grand Haven, Michigan, for Chicago, on 15 October 1880, with a cargo of ten rail cars of apples, and approximately 80 people aboard. Sank during "the worst gale in Lake Michigan recorded history" the following day, killing everyone aboard.			
Alva Bradley	Wooden schooner	1870	1894	United States	Foundered south of North Manitou Island on 13 October 1894, while laden with steel billets.	45.039267°N 85.985267°W		
Amasa Stone	Steel bulk freighter	1905	1965	United States	Sunk as a breakwater in Charlevoix, Michigan, with Charles S. Hebard.	45.31814°N 85.292155°W		
Amazon	Wooden package freighter	1873	1879	United States	Ran aground at Grand Haven, on 29 October 1879, while laden with flour and general merchandise.	43.054516°N 86.259114°W		
Andaste	Steel monitor	1892	1929	United States	Departed Ferrysburg, Michigan, for Chicago, with a load of gravel on 9 September 1929. Disappeared during a storm later that day, killing all 25 people aboard.			
Anna C. Minch	Steel bulk freighter	1903	1940	Canada	Sank near Pentwater, Michigan, on 11 November 1940, during the Armistice Day Storm, killing 24 people.	43.763067°N 86.462933°W		
Ann Arbor No. 5	Steel ferry	1910	after 1970	United States	Stern section began leaking and sank on the voyage from South Haven, Michigan, for a scrapyard in Holland, Michigan. Wreck discovered in 2005.	42.379333°N 86.457°W		
Appomattox	Wooden bulk freighter	1896	1905	United States	Stranded off Shorewood, Wisconsin, due to smoke obscuring visibility on 2 November 1905, while laden with coal, and towing the schooner-barge Santiago. Listed on the National Register of Historic Places in 2005.	43.093636°N 87.866208°W		
Arcadia	Wooden steam barge	1888	1907	United States	Foundered off Big Sable Point between 12 and 24 April 1907, reportedly killing 14 crewmen. Nameboard discovered on 27 April.			
Arctic	Wooden tugboat	1881	1930	United States	Dismantled and abandoned at Manitowoc, Wisconsin, in 1930. Listed on the National Register of Historic Places in 2018.	44.11405°N 87.63115°W		
Atlanta	Wooden steamship	1891	1906	United States	Burned near Cedar Grove, Wisconsin, while travelling between Milwaukee, Wisconsin, and Sheboygan, on 18 March 1906. Listed on the National Register of Historic Places in 2017.	43.570883°N 87.7827°W		
Aurora	Wooden barge	1887	1932	United States	Originally built as a bulk freighter. Abandoned in Grand Haven, in 1927, destroyed by fire in 1932.	43.076546°N 86.227765°W		
Australasia	Wooden bulk freighter	1884	1896	United States	Burned near Baileys Harbor, Wisconsin, on 17 October 1896, while bound for Milwaukee, laden with coal. Listed on the National Register of Historic Places in 2013.	44.92°N 87.1855°W		
Bayton	Steel bulk freighter	1904	1966	Canada	Sunk as a breakwater in Burns Harbor, in 1966.	41.648641°N 87.131251°W		
Bessie Smith	Wooden schooner-barge	1873	1873	United States	Blown ashore on the southern tip Beaver Island by a storm on 13 November 1873, while laden with iron ore.	45.576014°N 85.596406°W		
Boston	Wooden paddle steamer	1845	1846	United States	Lost power after the loss of her funnels compromised the boiler draft during a storm near Milwaukee on 11 November 1846, and was driven aground.			
Buffalo	Wooden barque	1837	1848	United States	Blown ashore at the Manitou Islands on 27 September 1848, while laden with lumber.			
Burlington	Steel canaller	1897	1936	United States	San aground while entering the harbour at Holland, on 6 December 1936, subsequently breaking in two.	42.771686°N 86.216708°W		
Calumet	Wooden bulk freighter	1884	1889	United States	Struck her anchor in the Detroit River while upbound from Buffalo, New York, for Milwaukee, with coal, receiving temporary repairs and a steam pump to keep the hull free of water. Began leaking during a storm on Lake Michigan following the pump's failure, beached near Fort Sheridan, Illinois, on 27 November 1889, to prevent her from sinking.	42.200022°N 87.716728°W		
Carl D. Bradley	Steel bulk freighter	1927	1958	United States	Broke in two and sank in a severe storm near Gull Island on 18 November 1958, while bound from Gary, Indiana, for Rogers City, Michigan, to load a cargo of limestone, killing 33 of the 35 people aboard.	45.559167°N 85.987778°W		
Cayuga	Steel package freighter	1889	1895	United States	Sank in a collision in fog with the wooden steam barge Joseph L. Hurd on 10 May 1895, near Ile Aux Galets, while laden with flour and miscellaneous cargo.	45.72065°N 85.190017°W		
C. E. Redfern	Wooden motor vessel	1890	1937	United States	Foundered in a severe gale off Point Betsie on 19 September 1937, while loaded with pulpwood. Wreck located in 2008.	44.700333°N 86.334167°W		
Charles Hubbard	Steel bulk freighter	1907	1966	United States	Sunk as a breakwater in Burns Harbor, in 1967.	41.649187°N 87.131122°W		
Charles S. Hebard	Steel bulk freighter	1906	1965	United States	Sunk as a breakwater in Charlevoix, with Amasa Stone.	45.319°N 85.290492°W		
Charles Stewart Parnell	Wooden bulk freighter	1888	1905	United States	Burned and sank near Squaw Island on 29 November 1905, while bound for Chicago, with a cargo of coal. Wreck located in 2025.	45.874861°N 85.647167°W		
Chicago	Wooden steam barge	1854	1882	United States	Burned to the waterline and sank near North Fox Island on 25 August 1882, while bound for Chicago, with a cargo of coal.			
Chicora	Wooden package freighter	1892	1895	United States	Disappeared during a storm on 21 January 1895, on a return trip from Milwaukee, for St. Joseph, Michigan, after delivering a cargo of flour. Wreck possibly located in 2018.			
City of Boston	Wooden steamship	1863	1873	United States	Ran ashore near Frankfort, on 20 November 1873, while laden with corn and flour.	44.58397°N 86.224455°W		
City of Glasgow	Wooden barge	1891	1917	United States	Broke loose from the tug John Hunsader while headed to Sturgeon Bay, with limestone on 6 October 1917, and stranded on a beach.	44.83865°N 87.270967°W		
City of Kalamazoo	Wooden barge	1892	1922	United States	Wrecked in Little Sturgeon Bay on 5 September 1922, while under tow of the tug Satisfaction. Listed on the National Register of Historic Places in 2000. Wreck originally misidentified as that of the steamer Puritan, the correct identity being established in 2022.	44.84555°N 87.549883°W		
City of Madison	Wooden steamship	1857	1877	United States	Burned and sank off Kenosha, Wisconsin, on 17 August 1877, while bound from Chicago, for Ludington, Michigan, without cargo. Wreck possibly located of Waukegan, Illinois, in 250 feet (76.2 m) of water.			
Col. Ellsworth	Wooden schooner	1861	1896	United States	Sank in a collision in the Straits of Mackinac with the schooner Emily B. Maxwell on 2 September 1896, while unladen, and headed for Chicago.	45.812389°N 85.017611°W		
Columbia	Wooden steamship	1873	1881	Canada	Sank near Frankfort, while bound from Chicago, for Collingwood, Ontario, with a cargo of corn on 10 September 1881, after her cargo shifted in a gale.			
Congress	Wooden steam barge	1867	1904	United States	Burned near South Manitou Island on 5 October 1904, while unloading lumber.	45.024833°N 86.090833°W		
Continental	Wooden bulk freighter	1882	1904	United States	Grounded during a snowstorm near Two Rivers, Wisconsin, on 12–13 December 1904, while bound from St. Ignace, Michigan, for Manitowoc, where she was scheduled to receive repairs prior to the 1905 shipping season. Listed on the National Register of Historic Places in 2009.	44.230556°N 87.508611°W		
Daisy Day	Wooden steam barge	1880	1891	United States	Grounded on a sandbar bear Claybanks Township, Michigan, on 11 October 1891, before departing for Milwaukee, with a cargo of lumber. Wreck located in 2003.	43.527833°N 86.488033°W		
David Dows	Wooden schooner	1881	1889	United States	Sprang a leak and sank in a storm on 25 November 1889, while under tow of the freighter Aurora, bound for Chicago with a cargo of coal.	41.765833°N 87.393°W		
Delaware	Wooden steamship	1846	1855	United States	Driven ashore in a storm near Sheboygan, on 5 November 1855, killing 11 members of the crew.	43.649733°N 87.724567°W		
Dolphin	Wooden schooner	1862	1869	United States	Sank in a collision in the Straits of Mackinac, near Waugoshance Light with the barque Badger State on 6 July 1869, while bound from Cleveland, Ohio, for Milwaukee, with a cargo of coal. Wreck located in 2021.	45.818867°N 84.9958°W		
Eber Ward	Wooden package freighter	1888	1909	United States	Sank in the Straits of Mackinac on 9 April 1909 after striking floating ice while bound from Milwaukee, for Port Huron, Michigan, with a cargo of corn.	45.812133°N 84.818883°W		
Empire State	Wooden barge	1862	1916	United States	Abandoned in Sturgeon Bay, in 1916, burned to the waterline in 1931. Listed on the National Register of Historic Places in 2003.	44.8419°N 87.39555°W		
E. M. B. A.	Wooden schooner-barge	1890	1932	United States	Scuttled outside Milwaukee, on 15 December 1932. Listed on the National Register of Historic Places in 2013.	43.065093°N 87.749585°W		
Equinox	Wooden steamship	1857	1875	United States	Foundered off Big Sable Point on 10 September 1875, while laden with salt, killing 25 people.			
Erie L. Hackley	Wooden excursion steamer	1882	1903	United States	Departed Menominee, Michigan, for Egg Harbor, Wisconsin, on 3 October 1903; carrying general merchandise, red bricks, and 19 people. Ran into a storm and sank about an hour later, killing 11 people.	45.061833°N 87.456167°W		
E. R. Williams	Wooden schooner	1873	1895	United States	Foundered in a gale off St. Martin Island on 22 September 1895, while bound from Escanaba, for Toledo, with a cargo of iron ore, in tow of the steamer Santa Maria.	45.532833°N 86.748500°W		
Falcon	Wooden bulk freighter	1881	1909	United States	Grounded on South Fox Island on 7 November 1909, while bound from Escanaba, for East Jordan, Michigan, with iron ore.	45.422183°N 85.879483°W		
F. J. King	Wooden schooner	1867	1886	United States	Sprang a leak and sank in a storm on 15 September 1886, while bound from Escanaba, for Chicago, with a cargo of iron ore. Wreck located in 2025, and listed on the National Register of Historic Places in 2026.	45.076133°N 86.993133°W		
Fletcher	Wooden bulk freighter	1873	1880	United States	Driven aground on South Fox Island by a storm on 21 November 1880, while from Chicago, for Buffalo, with corn.	45.444441°N 85.888844°W		
Flora M. Hill	Iron package freighter	1874	1912	United States	Crushed by ice outside Chicago, on 11 March 1912, while carrying brass automotive headlamps and passengers.	41.905667°N 87.584667°W		
Floretta	Wooden schooner	1868	1885	United States	Foundered near Centerville, Wisconsin, on 18 September 1885 after developing a leak during poor weather, while bound from Escanaba, for Chicago, with iron ore. Wreck listed on the National Register of Historic Places in 2014.	43.953993°N 87.536679°W		
Fountain City	Wooden bulk freighter	1857	1896	United States	Burned while docked in Sturgeon Bay, on 5 May 1896.	44.847139°N 87.390778°W		
Francisco Morazan	Steel ocean freighter	1922	1960	Liberia	Ran aground on South Manitou Island on 29 November 1960, due to a blinding snowstorm, while bound from Chicago, for Rotterdam, and Hamburg.	44.9966°N 86.1417°W		
Francis Hinton	Wooden steam barge	1889	1909	United States	Sprang a leak during a gale while bound from Manistique, Michigan, for Chicago, with a cargo of lumber on 16 November 1909. Ran aground while seeking shelter in Two Rivers. Listed on the National Register of Historic Places in 1996.	44.111167°N 87.631267°W		
Frank L. Vance	Wooden bulk freighter	1887	1910	United States	Burned to the waterline and sank mid-lake, southwest of Ludington, on 4 October 1910, while bound from Toledo, for Milwaukee, with a cargo of coal.			
Frank O'Connor	Wooden bulk freighter	1892	1919	United States	Burned to the waterline and sank near Cana Island on 3 October 1919, while laden with coal, bound from Buffalo, for Milwaukee, with a cargo of anthracite coal. Listed on the National Register of Historic Places in 1994.	45.11455°N 87.01265°W		
Fred McBrier	Wooden steam barge	1881	1890	United States	Sank in the Straits of Mackinac on 3 October 1890, in a collision with the freighter Progress, while downbound with iron ore from Gladstone, Michigan, towing the schooner-barges A. Stewart and J. B. Lozen.	45.8057°N 84.921683°W		
F. W. Wheeler	Wooden bulk freighter	1887	1893	United States	Stranded off Michigan City, Indiana, during a snow storm on 3 December 1893, while laden with coal.	41.746031°N 86.865464°W		
George F. Williams	Wooden bulk freighter	1889	1915	United States	Abandoned in 1913. Towed out into Lake Michigan, and scuttled off Hammond, Indiana, on 21 April 1915.	41.699476°N 87.510664°W		
George W. Morley	Wooden steam barge	1888	1897	United States	Burned directly offshore from Evanston, Illinois, on 5 December 1897, while bound from Milwaukee, to Chicago, without cargo.	42.044°N 87.668167°W		
Grace Patterson	Wooden steam barge	1880	1882	United States	Sprang a leak while bound from Manistee, Michigan, for Milwaukee, with lumber and lath on 15 March 1882, and ran ashore near Two Rivers. All salvage attempts failed.	44.18765°N 87.514383°W		
Grace Williams	Wooden steam barge	1885	1896	United States	Sank in a gale near the Manitou Islands on 28 May 1896, while being towed from Suttons Bay, Michigan, for Two Rivers.	45.032883°N 86.0516°W		
H. C. Akeley	Wooden bulk freighter	1881	1883	United States	Experienced engine failure during a storm on 11 November 1883, while bound from Chicago, for Buffalo, with a cargo of corn and the schooner Arab in tow. Sank two days later, killing six crewmen. Wreck located in 2001.	42.65875°N 86.528333°W		
Helvetia	Wooden schooner-barge	1873	1921	United States	Towed out into Lake Michigan, and scuttled via burning on 10 September 1921, near Sheboygan.	43.790333°N 87.607167°W		
Hennepin	Wooden barge	1888	1927	United States	Sprang a leak and sank during a moderate gale on 18 August 1927, while bound from Chicago, for Grand Haven, under tow of the tug Lotus. Wreck located in 2005, and listed on the National Register of Historic Places in 2008.	42.460833°N 86.696389°W		
Henry Cort	Whaleback freighter	1892	1934	United States	Collided with the breakwall during a storm at Muskegon, Michigan, on 30 November 1934. Sank against the wall the following day.	43.227167°N 86.345617°W		
Hippocampus	Wooden steamship	1867	1868	United States	Sank in a squall on 8 September 1868, while travelling from St. Joseph, for Chicago, laden with peaches. 26 lives lost.			
Hiram W. Sibley	Wooden bulk freighter	1890	1898	United States	Ran aground on South Manitou Island on 27 November 1898, while bound from Chicago, for Detroit, Michigan, with a cargo of corn. Refloated, but grounded on South Fox Island, and broke apart in a storm.	45.464483°N 85.788567°W		
Industry	Steel barge	1905	1953	United States	Broke loose from the tug John Roen IV during a storm on 5 October 1953, while bound from Sturgeon Bay, for Sault Ste. Marie, Michigan, ultimately headed to Lake Superior to perform salvage work. Fell into the trough of the waves and sank near Lansing Shoals.	45.910767°N 85.416117°W		
Iowa	Wooden steamship	1896	1915	United States	Crushed by ice near Chicago Harbor on 4 February 1915, while loaded with machinery.	41.896°N 87.562667°W		
Ironsides	Wooden steamship	1864	1873	United States	Sister ship of Lac La Belle. Ran into a storm on 14 September 1873, on a routine trip from Milwaukee, for Grand Haven, began leaking, and sank with the loss of roughly 20 lives the following day.	43.0483°N 86.3191°W		
Jarvis Lord	Wooden bulk freighter	1873	1885	United States	Sank after springing a leak in the Manitou Passage, while carrying iron ore from St. Ignace, for Chicago, on 17 or 18 August 1885. Modern speculation attributes the sinking to a possible grounding on a shoal.	44.963056°N 85.989722°W		
Java	Iron package freighter	1872	1878	United States	Departed Bay City, Michigan, on 17 August 1878, laden with salt bound for Chicago. Foundered of Big Sable Point the following morning, after developing a leak in her stern, presumably due to damage sustained near the propeller shaft.			
J. C. Ames	Wooden tugboat	1881	1923	United States	Towed out into Lake Michigan outside Manitowoc, and burned, in 1923. Wreck located in 2025.	44.109183°N 87.638533°W		
J. D. Marshall	Wooden steam barge	1891	1911	United States	Capsized near Michigan City, on 11 June 1911.	41.66868°N 87.065191°W		
Jennibel	Wooden schooner	1869	1881	United States	Capsized during a squall on Green Bay on 17 September 1881, while loaded with green wood and hemlock bound for Milwaukee. Righted herself and sank southwest of Chambers Island, while under tow. Listed on the National Register of Historic Places in 2026.	45.147139°N 87.421472°W		
J. M. Allmendinger	Wooden steam barge	1883	1895	United States	Ran aground during a blizzard on 26 November 1895, near Mequon, Wisconsin, while bound from Milwaukee, for Sturgeon Bay, with lumber. Listed on the National Register of Historic Places in 2018.	43.218117°N 87.894183°W		
John Evenson	Wooden tugboat	1884	1895	United States	Sank near Algoma, Wisconsin, on 5 June 1895, after being struck by the steamer I. Watson Stephens, while rendering assistance. Wreck located in 2024.	44.638133°N 87.371033°W		
John V. Moran	Wooden package freighter	1888	1899	United States	Left Milwaukee, for Muskegon, on 9 February 1899, laden with flour and miscellaneous cargo. Developed a leak after being punctured by ice early the following morning, taken in tow, but eventually cast off. Still afloat by 12 February. Wreck discovered in 2015.	43.163367°N 86.685653°W		
Joseph L. Hurd	Wooden barge	1869	1913	United States	Broke loose from her moorings during a storm at Sturgeon Bay, on 28 September 1913, grounded, and broke up.	44.903583°N 87.40575°W		
Joys	Wooden steam barge	1884	1898	United States	Burned while docked in the Sturgeon Bay Ship Canal on 24 December 1898. Remains eventually towed to, and beached at Dunlap Reef. Listed on the National Register of Historic Places in 2007.	44.849083°N 87.38905°W		
Julia	Iron paddle steamer	1843	1894	United States	Built to survey the topography of the Great Lakes. Originally named Colonel Abert, then Surveyor. Abandoned in the Sheboygan River in 1888, then scuttled in Sheboygan harbour in November 1894.	43.74965°N 87.70195°W		
Kalamazoo	Wooden steam barge	1888	1892	United States	Sank in the middle of Lake Michigan due to a collision with the steamer Pilgrim on 25 May 1892, while bound from Holland, to Chicago.			
Kate Williams	Wooden tugboat	1862	1907	United States	Wrecked by a storm in September 1907, while at anchor between Washington Island and Rock Island.	45.402°N 86.85085°W		
Kate Winslow	Wooden schooner	1872	1897	United States	Broke loose from the freighter Queen of the West during a gale on 13 October 1897, while bound from Gladstone, for Sandusky, Ohio, with pig iron. Though able to sail for a while, Kate Winslow began leaking, and sank near Seul Choix Point.			
Keuka	Wooden schooner-barge	1889	1932	United States	Abandoned in Lake Charlevoix, and sank in August 1932.	45.305556°N 85.238139°W		
Lac La Belle	Wooden steamship	1864	1872	United States	Sister ship of Ironsides. Ran into a storm on 13 October 1872, on a routine trip for Grand Haven, began leaking, and sank with the loss of eight lives early the following day. Wreck located in 2022.	42.602533°N 87.526717°W		
Lady Elgin	Wooden paddle steamer	1851	1860	United States	Left Milwaukee, for Chicago, on the morning of 6 September 1860, with over 300 passengers on board. She commenced her return trip to Milwaukee, on the evening of the following day, with Lake Superior as her eventual destination. As Lady Elgin travelled north, heavy winds began to build. On the morning of 8 November, she was struck by the schooner Augusta, and sank off Winnetka, Illinois, killing over 300 people.	42.183333°N 87.65°W		
Lakeland	Steel package freighter	1887	1924	United States	Developed a serious leak and sank on 3 December 1924, near Sturgeon Bay, while bound from Chicago, for Detroit, loaded with 23 automobiles. Listed on the National Register of Historic Places in 2015.	44.789°N 87.188667°W		
LaSalle	Wooden schooner	1874	1875	United States	Grounded near Two Rivers, on 22 October 1875, while bound from Chicago, for Buffalo, with wheat, after experiencing rudder failure during a gale. Listed on the National Register of Historic Places in 2017.	44.192067°N 87.50985°W		
Leonard Hanna	Wooden schooner	1872	1887	United States	Ran aground on South Fox Island due to fog on 11 October 1887, while laden with iron ore.	45.465083°N 85.789433°W		
Louisiana	Wooden bulk freighter	1887	1913	United States	Grounded and burned while seeking refuge from a storm at Washington Island, on 8 November 1913, while bound from Milwaukee, for Escanaba, without cargo. Listed on the National Register of Historic Places in 1992.	45.399667°N 86.922667°W		
Louisville	Wooden steamship	1853	1857	United States	Burned and sank off Calumet, Illinois, while travelling from Chicago, for St. Joseph, with a cargoo of grain, on 29 September 1857.	41.769333°N 87.339833°W		
L. R. Doty	Wooden bulk freighter	1893	1898	United States	Sank near Milwaukee, during a storm on 25 October 1898, while bound from South Chicago, Illinois, for Midland, Ontario, with a cargo of corn, and the schooner-barge Olive Jeanette in tow, killing all 17 crewmen. Wreck located in 2010.	42.985062°N 87.533941°W		
LV-57	Wooden lightship	1891	after 1928	United States	Wrecked by a storm sometime after 1928, after use as a clubhouse in Milwaukee. Listed on the National Register of Historic Places in 1996.	43.001533°N 87.8855°W		
Maitland	Wooden barquentine	1861	1871	United States	Sank in a collision in the Straits of Mackinac, near Waugoshance Point with the schooners Golden Harvest and Mears on 11 June 1871, while bound from Chicago, for Buffalo, with corn.	45.80415°N 84.875917°W		
Major Anderson	Wooden barquentine	1861	1871	United States	Ran aground near Two Rivers, on 7 October 1871, due to a navigation error caused by forest fires, while bound from Erie, Pennsylvania, for Chicago, with a cargo of coal. Listed on the National Register of Historic Places in 2014.	44.1826°N 87.5111°W		
Manistee	Wooden steamship	1882	1914	United States	Burned and sank while docked in Spring Lake, Michigan, on 28 June 1914.	43.081139°N 86.202833°W		
Mary Stewart	Wooden steamship	1855	1866	United States	Grounded and sank during a storm outside Pentwater, on 11 November 1866.	43.781694°N 86.444°W		
Material Service	Steel barge	1929	1936	United States	Left Lockport, Illinois, on 28 July 1936, after loading sand bound for Calumet Harbor, Illinois. Sunk by a rough seas near her destination the following day, killing 15 crewmen. Listed on the National Register of Historic Places in 2014.	41.738833°N 87.503833°W		
Mendota	Wooden steamship	1857	1875	United States	Lost in a storm off Big Sable Point on 10 September 1875, while bound from Buffalo, for Chicago, with a cargo of coal and the barges Evening Star and Morning Star in tow, killing 12 crewmen.			
Merchant	Iron package freighter	1862	1875	United States	Ran aground on Racine Reef outside Racine, Wisconsin, on 6 October 1875, subsequently breaking up.	42.72995°N 87.764217°W		
Michigan	Iron package freighter	1881	185	United States	Became trapped in ice on 9 February 1885, after departing Grand Haven, to assist the steamer Oneida. Remained afloat until 19 March, when she sank after being crushed by ice. Wreck located in 2005.	42.800083°N 86.516433°W		
Milwaukee	Wooden steamship	1852	1859	United States	Sank near Grays Reef on 29 November 1895, in a collision with the schooner J. H. Tiffany, while bound from Milwaukee, for Buffalo, with wheat and flour.	45.725°N 85.2475°W		
Milwaukee	Wooden paddle steamer	1859	1868	United States	Ran aground on a sandbar while entering the harbour at Grand Haven, on 8 October 1868, during a storm.	43.061518°N 86.257162°W		
Milwaukee	Wooden steam barge	1868	1886	United States	Sank in a collision with the steam barge C. Hickox on 9 July 1886, while heading from Chicago, to Muskegon, to load lumber. Wreck located in 2023.	42.734833°N 86.9025°W		
Milwaukee	Steel ferry	1902	1929	United States	Sank in a severe storm on 22 October 1929, while on a return trip to Grand Haven, from Milwaukee, carrying 25 rail cars containing miscellaneous goods, killing 46 people. Listed on the National Register of Historic Places in 2015.	43.136317°N 87.832283°W		
Milwaukee Fireboat 17	Wooden fireboat	1893	1930	United States	Scuttled near Milwaukee, on 12 May 1930. Wreck located in 2024.	43.0555°N 87.79215°W		
Milwaukee Fireboat 23	Wooden fireboat	1896	1922	United States	Scuttled through burning near Milwaukee, in December 1922. Wreck located in 2005.	43.015778°N 87.802917°W		
Milwaukie	Wooden schooner	1836	1842	United States	Ran aground at the mouth of the Kalamazoo River on 16 November 1842, after loading additional cargo, and resuming her trip from St. Joseph, for Buffalo, laden with flour.	42.695517°N 86.209153°W		
Minneapolis	Wooden bulk freighter	1873	1894	United States	Sank in the Straits of Mackinac on 4 April 1894, while travelling from Chicago, to Buffalo, with a cargo of corn.	45.808517°N 84.731733°W		
Minnehaha	Wooden schooner-barge	1880	1893	United States	Cast off from the freighter Henry J. Johnson after receiving damage in a storm and grounded near Arcadia, Michigan, on 13 October 1893, while bound from Chicago, for Point Edward, Ontario, with a cargo of corn.	44.495306°N 86.241833°W		
M. J. Bartelme	Steel bulk freighter	1895	1928	United States	Ran aground on Cana Island on 4 October 1928, while bound from Milwaukee, for Escanaba, without cargo.	45.0866°N 87.046833°W		
Mojave	Wooden barquentine	1863	1864	United States	Sank in a storm on 8 November 1864, while laden with corn bound from Chicago, for Buffalo. Wreck located in 2016, and listed on the National Register of Historic Places in 2024.	43.8065°N 87.4545°W		
Monitor	Wooden steam barge	1870	1890	United States	Foundered in a gale near Racine, on 19 August 1890, while bound from Pierport, Michigan, for Milwaukee, with lumber.			
Muskegon	Wooden sandsucker	1872	1910	United States	Burned on 6 October 1910, while docked in Michigan City, while loaded with sand.	41.716667°N 86.933333°W		
Muskegon	Wooden paddle steamer	1871	1905	United States	Damaged beyond repair while in dry dock in Milwaukee, on 22 September 1896. Towed to Manitowoc, that same year, and was dismantled and abandoned in 1905.	44.10695°N 87.64235°W		
Muskegon	Iron paddle steamer	1881	1919	United States	Collided with the breakwater while entering the harbour at Muskegon, during a gale, on a routine voyage from Milwaukee, on 28 October 1919, killing around 30 people.	43.224918°N 86.34701°W		
Nahant	Wooden bulk freighter	1873	1897	United States	Burned while docked at Escanaba, on 29 November 1897.	45.746534°N 87.044892°W		
Nevada	Wooden bulk freighter	1882	1890	United States	Sprang a leak in a gale on 15 November 1890, while bound from Cleveland, for Sheboygan. Sank near Two Rovers, after being towed by the freighter Manchester for two hours.			
Niagara	Wooden paddle steamer	1845	1856	United States	Burned and sank off Belgium, Wisconsin, on 24 September 1856, while bound from Collingwood, for Chicago, killing over 60 people. Listed on the National Register of Historic Places in 1996.	43.238333°N 87.845278°W		
Niko	Wooden steam barge	1889	1924	United States	Sank in a gale off Garden Island on 2 November 1924, while headed for Manistique, with a cargo of lumber, and the schooner-barge C. E. Redfern in tow.	45.805592°N 85.441708°W		
No. 2	Wooden railway barge	1895	1907	United States	Capsized in the Chicago harbour due to the faulty loading of railway cars on 6 September 1906. Raised, towed out into Lake Michigan and sunk by dynamite early in 1907.	41.748367°N 87.450042°W		
Norlond	Wooden package freighter	1890	1922	United States	Left Chicago, for Milwaukee, on 13 November 1922, docked in Racine, the following day to patch leaks developed during a gale. Resumed her voyage on 15 November, but sprang a leak again, sinking near Milwaukee.	42.970833°N 87.812333°W		
Northwest	Wooden schooner	1873	1898	United States	Sank in the Straits of Mackinac on 6 April 1898, after striking ice, while under tow of the freighter Aurora from Chicago, for Buffalo, laden with corn.	45.790833°N 84.858133°W		
Novadoc	Steel canaller	1928	1940	Canada	San aground near Pentwater, during the Armistice Day storm on 11 November 1940, while bound from Chicago, for Port-Alfred, Quebec.	43.696683°N 86.5159°W		
Orion	Wooden paddle steamer	1865	1870	United States	Grounded on a sand bar at Grand Haven, on 16 October 1870, while carrying 700 barrels of apples. Later destroyed by storm	43.055331°N 86.254249°W		
Pathfinder	Wooden schooner-barge	1869	1886	United States	Broke loose from the steam barge Jim Sherrifs during a severe snow storm on 17 November 1886, while laden with iron ore, and grounded on Rawley Point. Listed on the National Register of Historic Places in 2015.	44.245547°N 87.511456°W		
Pere Marquette 18	Steel ferry	1902	1910	United States	Left Ludington, Michigan, for Milwaukee, on the night of 8 September 1910, laden with 29 rail cars containing coal and other freight. Developed a serious leak in her stern the following morning, sinking a few hours later, killing 29 people. Wreck discovered in 2020.	43.7417°N 87.3044°W		
Peshtigo	Wooden schooner	1863	1878	United States	Sank near Beaver Island on 25 June 1878, in a collision with the schooner St. Andrew, which also sank, while bound from Erie, for Chicago, with a cargo of coal. Originally believed to have been lost on Lake Huron, which was disproved following the discovery of the wrecks in 2019.	45.484346°N 85.491666°W		
Pillsbury	Steel bulk freighter	1901	1966	United States	Sunk as a breakwater in Burns Harbor, in 1966.	41.649171°N 87.131461°W		
P. J. Ralph	Wooden steam barge	1889	1924	United States	Dragged her anchor and ran aground on South Manitou Island on 8 September 1924, while laden with lumber.	45.014444°N 86.090583°W		
Plymouth	Wooden schooner-barge	1854	1913	United States	Departed Menominee without cargo on 6 November 1913, for Search Bay, near Hessel, Michigan, in tow of the tug James H. Martin. After remaining at anchor behind St. Martin Island until 8 November, Plymouth was towed to, and anchored at to Gull Island, where James H. Martin left her. On 11 November, the most destructive storm in the history of the Great Lakes struck Lake Michigan, sinking Plymouth, and the 7 people aboard.	45.518639°N 86.676833°W		
Princeton	Steel bulk freighter	1900	1967	United States	Sunk as a breakwater in Burns Harbor, in 1967.	41.649199°N 87.131297°W		
Prins Willem V	Steel ocean freighter	1948 (Note: Construction started in 1939.)	1954	Netherlands	Collided with the towing cables connecting the tug Chicago and the Sinclair Oil Corporation's Barge No. 12 shortly after leaving Milwaukee, on 14 October 1954, while laden with a mixed cargo bound for Europe.	43.02565°N 87.8088°W		
R. G. Peters	Wooden steam barge	1880	1882	United States	Caught fire and burned to the waterline in a severe gale and snowstorm near Milwaukee, on 2 December 1882, while headed from St. Joseph, for Manistee, with the barge A. W. Luckey in tow, killing all 14 aboard.			
Richard Winslow	Wooden schooner	1871	1898	United States	Sprang a leak and sank near White Shoals, in the vicinity of the Straits of Mackinac on 3 September 1898, while laden with iron ore and in tow of the steamer Inter-Ocean. Wreck flattened by explosives in 1902.	45.842553°N 85.14267°W		
Rising Sun	Wooden steamship	1884	1917	United States	Grounded on Pyramid Point near Sleeping Bear Dunes on 29 October 1917, while hauling supplies from St. Joseph, to the House of David's compound on High Island.	44.969356°N 85.931829°W		
R. J. Hackett	Wooden bulk freighter	1869	1905	United States	Caught fire on 12 November 1905, while loaded with coal, and purposefully beached on Whaleback Shoal in Green Bay. Listed on the National Register of Historic Places in 1992.	45.357778°N 87.181944°W		
Robert C. Pringle	Wooden tugboat	1903	1922	United States	Struck a floating object and sank on 19 June 1922, while headed from Milwaukee, to Sandusky, Ohio, with a freighter in tow. Wreck located in 2008, and listed on the National Register of Historic Place in 2020.	43.691667°N 87.555°W		
Robert Willis	Wooden brig	1852	1853	United States	Departed Chicago, on 21 November 1853, laden with wheat bound for Buffalo. Went missing during the voyage, likely sinking a storm sweeping Lake Michigan between 23 and 24 November, near Ile Aux Galets. Unsubstantiated rumours claimed Robert Willis and her crew were lured ashore on Beaver Island by Mormon leader James Strang and his followers.			
Rosinco	Steel yacht	1916	1928	United States	Departed Milwaukee for Chicago on 18 September 1928. Struck an underwater obstruction off Kenosha early the following morning, tearing a large hole in her hull, and sinking. Wreck listed on the National Register of Historic Places in 2001.	42.625°N 87.627°W		
Rotarian	Wooden paddle steamer	1889	1931	United States	Machinery removed in 1927, and converted for use as a restaurant at Clark Street on the Chicago River. Sank after falling into disrepair in 1931; raised and scuttled in Lake Michigan on 28 September, that year.	41.950278°N 87.434444°W		
Salvor	Steel barge	1896	1930	United States	Originally built as the turret deck ship Turret Chief, later converted to barge. Grounded near Muskegon, on 26 September 1930, after breaking free from a tug while headed to that port from DeTour, Michigan, while carrying stone.	43.26025°N 86.36865°W		
Sandusky	Wooden brig	1848	1856	United States	Sank in a gale in the Straits of Mackinac on either 18 or 20 September 1856, while carrying grain from Chicago, to Buffalo.	45.799317°N 84.837483°W		
SC-419	SC-1-class subchaser	1918	after 1929	United States	Subchaser sunk as a breakwater off Zion, Illinois, in the 1930s. SC-419 established as the most likely identity of the wreck, though SC-418 is also a possible candidate.	42.458917°N 87.7969°W		
S. C. Baldwin	Wooden barge	1871	1908	United States	Capsized near Two Rivers, on 27 August 1908, while southbound from Sturgeon Bay, with a cargo of stone. Listed on the National Register of Historic Places in 2016.	44.193011°N 87.453247°W		
Sea Bird	Wooden paddle steamer	1859	1868	United States	Burned offshore of Waukegan, on 9 April 1868, while carrying passengers and general freight from Two Rivers, to Chicago. Between 72 and 100 people died.	42.314867°N 87.821033°W		
Sebastopol	Wooden paddle steamer	1855	1855	United States	Left Buffalo, for Chicago, on September 12, 1855, with 60 passengers and a mixed cargo. Grounded during a storm near St. Francis, Wisconsin, on 18 September, after the crew mistook lights ashore for those of the piers at Milwaukee.	42.986306°N 87.863306°W		
Senator	Steel bulk freighter	1896	1929	United States	Sank in a collision with the freighter Marquette 16 miles (25.7 km) west of Port Washington, Wisconsin, while bound from Milwaukee, for Detroit, laden with 268 Nash automobiles, killing seven. Wreck located in 2005, listed on the National Register of Historic Places in 2016.	43.335644°N 87.569846°W		
Sheboygan	Wooden paddle steamer	1869	1914	United States	Towed out into Lake Michigan from Manitowoc, and burned on 24 September 1914.	44.109417°N 87.63785°W		
Sidney O. Neff	Wooden steam barge	1890	1939	United States	Towed into Lake Michigan from the Menominee River on 31 October 1939, and scuttled. Listed on the National Register of Historic Places in 2022.	45.092°N 87.577°W		
Silver Lake	Wooden scow-schooner	1889	1900	United States	Sank in a collision with the ferry Pere Marquette in fog near Mosel, Wisconsin, on 27 May 1900, while bound from Manitowoc, for Racine, with maple wood. Wreck listed on the National Register of Historic Places in 2013.	43.806167°N 87.577667°W		
Silver Spray	Wooden excursion steamer	1894	1914	United States	Stranded on Morgan Shoal just outside Chicago, on 15 July 1914, while trying to unload passengers. A failed salvage attempt resulted in her capsizing, and destruction by heavy weather.	41.808155°N 87.583529°W		
St. Albans	Wooden canaller	1868	1881	United States	Sank after being punctured by ice near Milwaukee, on 30 January 1881, while headed from that port for Ludington, carrying flour and livestock.	43.066533°N 87.759267°W		
St. Andrew	Wooden schooner	1857	1878	United States	Sank near Beaver Island on 25 June 1878, in a collision with the schooner Peshtigo, which also sank, while bound from Chicago, for Buffalo, with a cargo of corn. Originally believed to have been lost on Lake Huron, which was disproved following the discovery of the wrecks in 2019.	45.484188°N 85.491686°W		
State of Michigan	Wooden steamship	1873	1901	United States	Sank off Montague, Michigan, on 15 or 18 October 1901, while travelling between Muskegon, and Manistee, with a cargo of salt destined for Chicago, after her engine's piston rod broke and punctured her hull.	43.388933°N 86.464183°W		
St. Lawrence	Wooden bulk freighter	1890	1898	United States	Driven ashore by a storm on Point Betsie, on 25 November 1898, while loaded with corn bound from Chicago, for Prescott, Ontario.	44.671817°N 86.26165°W		
Sumatra	Wooden schooner	1889	1934	United States	Sprang a leak and sank during heavy weather off Milwaukee harbour on 27 October 1896, while bound from Chicago, for Lake Superior with rail iron, in tow of the tug Arnold.	43.023667°N 87.883333°W		
Sunny Side	Wooden schooner	1862	1883	United States	Sank north of North Fox Island on 19 August 1883, after colliding with her towmate, the schooner S. L. Foster, during a squall, while being towed from Escanaba, to Cleveland, by the freighter William H. Barnum.			
Superior	Wooden bulk freighter	1873	1898	United States	Beached on Gull Island on 28 August 1898, after developing a leak while hauling iron ore from Escanaba, for Toledo.	45.715278°N 85.833694°W		
Sydney C. McLouth	Wooden package freighter	1880	1912	United States	Burned to the waterline and sank in Green Bay near Pensaukee, Wisconsin, on 27 June 1912, after unloading cement in Green Bay, Wisconsin. Previously named Rochester.	44.833417°N 87.814767°W		
Tampico	Steel canaller	1900	1968	United States	Sunk as a breakwater in Frankfort, in 1968, with Adrian Iselin.	44.629554°N 86.225964°W		
The Straits of Mackinac	Steel ferry	1928	2003	United States	Sunk as a diving attraction near Evanston, in 2003	42.0455°N 87.514°W		
Thomas A. Scott	Wooden schooner-barge	1869	1880	United States	Sank in a collision with the package freighter Avon near Milwaukee, on 29 October 1880, while under tow of the freighter Connemaugh, laden with corn from Chicago. Wreck located in 2005.	43.024933°N 87.8722°W		
Thomas H. Smith	Wooden steam barge	1881	1893	United States	Sank in a collision near Racine, during fog, with the package freighter Arthur Orr on 11 November 1893, while bound from Menominee, for Chicago, while towing the schooner William Aldritch. Wreck located in 2024.	42.779617°N 87.64365°W		
Thomas Hume	Wooden schooner	1870	1891	United States	Disappeared without a trace during a storm on 21 May 1891, while sailing empty from Chicago, for Muskegon. Wreck located in 2005.	41.940917°N 87.178317°W		
Three Brothers	Wooden steam barge	1888	1911	United States	Sprang a leak during a gale while bound from Boyne City, Michigan, for Chicago with a cargo of lumber on 27 September 1911. Run ashore on South Manitou Island to prevent her from sinking.	45.01075°N 86.091944°W		
Toledo	Wooden steamship	1854	1856	United States	Departed Port Washington on 24 October 1856, for Milwaukee with either 41 or 81 passengers and crew and package freight on board, when a violent storm began to form. The ship's crew decided to lower the anchor, but its chain got caught. Before her crew could free the anchor chain with axes, she ran aground. The storm rapidly broke up the ship, leading to the loss of all but two of the passengers and crew.	43.38885°N 87.85555°W		
Transfer	Wooden schooner-barge	1872	1923	United States	Scuttled outside Milwaukee, by ramming on 6 December 1923. Wreck located in 2009, and listed on the National Register of Historic Places in 2021.	43.018167°N 87.764167°W		
Trinidad	Wooden schooner	1867	1881	United States	Developed a leak during moderate waves on 10 May 1881, while bound from Port Huron, for Milwaukee, with a cargo of coal. Sank near Algoma, the following day, after a sudden exacerbation of the leak. Wreck discovered in 2023, and listed on the National Register of Historic Places in 2024.	44.574917°N 87.20225°W		
T. S. Christie	Wooden steam barge	1885	1933	United States	Driven ashore by a blizzard near Manistee, on 7 November 1933, while loaded with cordwood.	44.3061°N 86.30655°W		
Tubal Cain	Wooden barque	1866	1867	United States	Grounded near Two Rivers, on the morning of 26 November 1867, due to heavy winds, while bound from Milwaukee, for Oswego, New York, with a cargo of wheat. Listed on the National Register of Historic Places in 2017.	44.156017°N 87.542167°W		
Uganda	Wooden bulk freighter	1892	1913	United States	Sank in the Straits of Mackinac on 19 April 1913, after being cut by ice, while bound from Milwaukee, for Buffalo, with a cargo of corn.	45.84255°N 85.049967°W		
Vega	Steel bulk freighter	1893	1905	United States	Driven ashore on South Fox Island by the Mataafa Storm on 29 November 1905, while bound for Gary, with iron ore. Pounded to pieces by the storm.	45.440517°N 85.850583°W		
Vernon	Wooden package freighter	1886	1887	United States	Departed Frankfort, on 28 October 1887, headed for the eastern shore of Lake Michigan laden with miscellaneous freight. Foundered in a heavy storm near Rawley Point the following day, killing around 50 people, leaving only a single survivor.	44.202222°N 87.412222°W		
Volunteer	Wooden bulk freighter	1888	1914	United States	Towed out into Lake Michigan near Milwaukee, and scuttled, following the removal of her machinery.	42.984578°N 87.860428°W		
Walter B. Allen	Wooden schooner	1866	1880	United States	Damaged during a grounding on South Manitou Island on 10 April 1880. Sank in a gale while being towed to Manitowoc. Wreck listed on the National Register of Historic Places in 2011.	43.83035°N 87.6087°W		
Walter L. Frost	Wooden package freighter	1883	1903	United States	Stranded on South Manitou Island on 4 November 1903, while bound from Chicago, for Ogdensburg, New York, loaded with corn and general merchandise.	44.996033°N 86.142533°W		
W. C. Kimball	Wooden schooner	1888	1891	United States	Disappeared on a trip from Manistee, for Northport, Michigan, on 8 May 1891, laden with shingles and salt, killing all four aboard. Located in 2019, the wreck is the most intact wooden schooner ever discovered.	44.838886°N 86.298601°W		
Wells Burt	Wooden schooner	1873	1883	United States	Foundered in a storm off Evanston, on 20 May 1883, while bound from Buffalo, for Chicago, with a cargo of coal, killing all eleven crew members. A subsequent investigation revealed a faulty rudder compounded the weather conditions, causing Wells Burt to sink.	42.046028°N 87.618389°W		
Westmoreland	Wooden steamship	1853	1854	United States	Sank in a storm near Sleeping Bear Point on 7 December 1854, while laden with a mixed cargo, killing 15 to 17 people. Wreck discovered in 2010.	44.779558°N 86.173652°W		
W. H. Gilcher	Steel bulk freighter	1890	1892	United States	Disappeared during a gale on 28 October 1892, while laden with coal bound from Buffalo, for Milwaukee. Sister ship, Western Reserve, split in two several months earlier, due to deficiencies in the steel used in her construction.			
William A. Reiss	Steel bulk freighter	1901	1934	United States	Ran aground while trying to enter the harbour at Sheboygan, on 13 October 1934, with a cargo of coal	43.74645°N 87.691767°W		
William B. Davock	Steel bulk freighter	1907	1940	United States	Sank near Pentwater, on 11 November 1940, during the Armistice Day Storm, while laden with coal, killing 32 people.	43.672783°N 86.605583°W		
William Livingstone Jr.	Wooden tugboat	1874	1880	United States	Sank off Cana Island on 4 October 1880, while bound for Peshtigo, Wisconsin, with two barges, after experiencing engine failure and developing a leak.			
William T. Graves	Wooden bulk freighter	1867	1885	United States	Ran aground on North Manitou Island on 31 October 1885, while bound from Chicago, to Buffalo, with corn and the schooner–barge George W. Adams in tow.	45.049167°N 86.0075°W		
Wisconsin	Iron package freighter	1881	1929	United States	Abandoned in Sturgeon Bay, in 1916, burned to the waterline in 1931. Listed on the National Register of Historic Places in 2009.	42.532683°N 87.708733°W		
Wisconsin	Wooden schooner-barge	1882	1935	United States	Built as a package freighter, rebuilt as a schooner-barge in 1919. Scuttled via burning near Green Island in Green Bay, in 1935.	45.079°N 87.491667°W		
W. L. Brown	Wooden steam barge	1880 (Note: Built from Neptune, a vessel constructed in 1856.)	1886	United States	Sprang a leak and sank near Green Island on 21 October 1886, while bound from Escanaba, for De Pere, Wisconsin, with a cargo of pig iron.	44.964667°N 87.552167°W		

== See also ==
- List of shipwrecks on the Great Lakes
- List of Great Lakes shipwrecks on the National Register of Historic Places
- List of shipwrecks in the Thunder Bay National Marine Sanctuary

== Bibliography ==
- Kohl, Cris (2008). The Great Lakes Diving Guide (2nd ed.). West Chicago: Seawolf Communications. ISBN 978-0-9679-9769-8 – via Internet Archive.
- Mansfield, John Brandt (1899). History of the Great Lakes. Chicago: J. H. Beers & Company – via Internet Archive.
