= SS Milwaukee =

Nine steamships have been named SS Milwaukee (or derivation).

- SS Milwaukee (1852), U.S. package freighter.
- SS Milwaukee (1868), U.S. steam barge.
- SS Milwaukee (1879), also known as Yonkers, U.S. package freighter.
- SS Milwaukee (1889), U.S. tugboat.
- SS Milwaukee (1902), U.S. package freighter.
- SS Manistique-Marquette & Northern No. 1 (1902), also known as SS Milwaukee (1902), U.S. ferry.
- SS Juniata (1904), also known as SS Milwaukee Clipper, U.S. passenger ship.
- SS City of Milwaukee (1931), U.S. ferry.

== See also ==
- USS Milwaukee
- MS Milwaukee (1929), a German transatlantic cruise ship of the Hamburg-America Line. As spoils of war, it entered British service in 1945 as Empire Waveney.
