= SS Vernon =

American passenger and package freighter ship sunk in Lake Michigan

Coordinates: 44°12′08″N 87°24′44″W

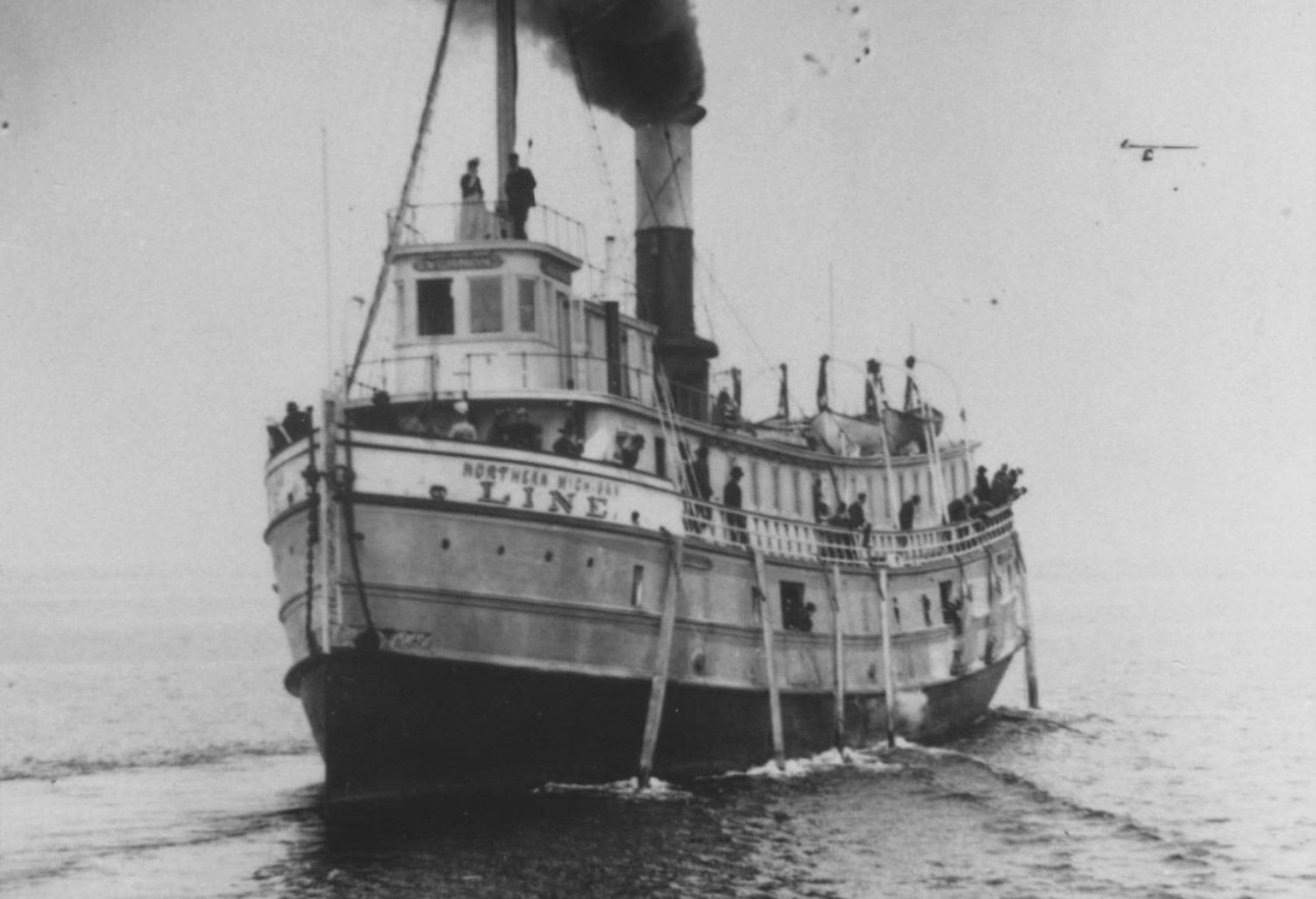
- Vernon before she sank

History

United States
- Name: Vernon
- Namesake: W. Vernon Booth
- Owner: Alfred Booth
- Operator: Northern Michigan Line
- Port of registry: Chicago, Illinois, United States
- Builder: James P. Smith of Chicago, Illinois
- In service: September 1/2, 1886
- Identification: Registry number US 161557
- Fate: Sank October 29, 1887

General characteristics
- Type: Passenger and package freighter
- Tonnage: 694.94 GRT; 560.41 NRT
- Length: 158.58 ft (48.34 m)
- Beam: 25.42 ft (7.75 m)
- Depth: 18.66 ft (5.69 m)
- Installed power: Engine: 565 hp (421 kW) fore and aft compound engine; Boilers: 2 × 125 psi (860 kPa) Scotch marine boilers
- Propulsion: 1 × fixed pitch propeller
- Speed: 13 knots (24 km/h; 15 mph)
- Crew: 23–25

SS Vernon was a wooden-hulled American passenger and package freighter that sank in a Lake Michigan storm on October 29, 1887, near Two Rivers, Wisconsin, with the loss of between 36 and 50 lives, making her one of the deadliest shipwrecks ever to have occurred in Wisconsin. Only one of the people on board survived.

Vernon was built in 1886 in Chicago, Illinois by the James P. Smith shipyard. She was built for Alfred Booth, also of Chicago. That same year, she replaced the package freighter A. Booth (which sank on August 29, 1886, near Duluth, Minnesota) in the Duluth, Minnesota-Port Arthur, Ontario run on Lake Superior. For a time in 1887, Vernon was engaged in the iron ore trade, towing schooner barges between Lake Superior ports and Cleveland, Ohio. In July 1887, Vernon briefly came into the ownership of John Pridgeon of Detroit, Michigan, to whom she was sold as compensation for the damage done to his scow barges while they were being towed by Vernon. In August of that same year, Vernon once again became owned by Booth and was operated as part of his Booth Packing Company. Around the same time, she was chartered by the Northern Michigan Line in order to replace their steamer Champlain which had burned down in Charlevoix, Michigan.

In October 1887, Vernon was bound from Cheboygan, Michigan, for Chicago, making stops at several ports along the way. On October 28, she left Frankfort, Michigan, for the lake's western shore, she began encountering rough seas. Eventually, she became overwhelmed by the waves, sinking near Two Rivers on the morning of October 29. Only one person, fireman Axel Stone, survived.

Discovered in 1969, the wreck of Vernon rests intact in 210 feet (64 m) of water.

== History ==
=== Design and construction ===
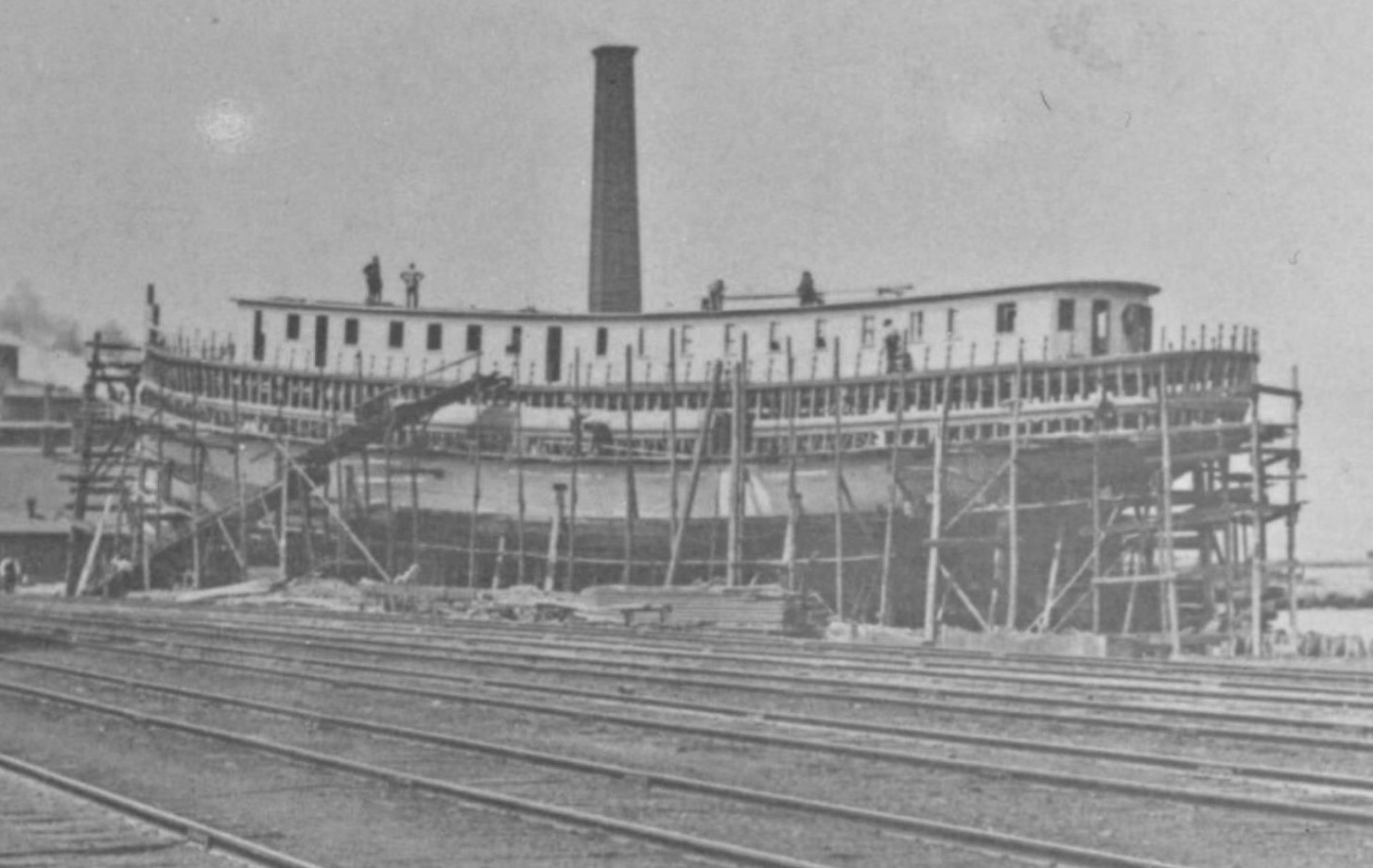
Vernon under construction in Chicago

Vernon (Official number 161557) was built in 1886 in Chicago, Illinois, by the shipyard owned by James P. Smith. Her wooden hull was 158.58 feet (48.3 m) (some sources state 177 feet (53.9 m)) in length, 25.42 feet (7.7 m) wide and 18.66 feet (5.7 m) deep. Vernon had a gross register tonnage of 694.94 tons and a net register tonnage of 560.41 tons.

Vernon was powered by a two-cylinder 565 hp (421 kW) fore and aft compound engine; the cylinders of the engine had bores of 22 inches (56 cm) and 40 inches (100 cm) and a stroke of 24 inches (61 cm). Steam for the engine was produced by two 16-by-6.6-foot (4.9 m × 2.0 m) 125 psi (860 kPa) Scotch marine boilers. The engine and boilers were manufactured by the Marine Boiler Works in Chicago. She was propelled to a top speed of 15 miles per hour (13 kn; 24 km/h) by a single fixed pitch propeller.

Vernon was built to carry passengers and freight from Chicago to Manistique, Michigan/Northern Lake Michigan in as little time as possible. She was regarded as one of the most elegant ships on the Great Lakes. Equipped with extensive brass fittings, eighteen state rooms and one very large cabin lounge, she cost $78,000 (equivalent to $2.4 million in 2024) to build.

Vernon had an abnormally deep draft when compared to her narrow beam, which caused her to become unstable when she was fully loaded. At the time of her construction, sailors criticized Vernon's builders for sacrificing her buoyancy and stability in return for speed, predicting that she would "sooner or later meet with disaster".

Great Lakes shipping expert Steve Harold wrote that:

"From the start, the Vernon was known to have an unusual, perhaps defective, hull design. Even when empty, she had an extreme draft and sat very low in the water. Some people later declared it was even unsafe for her to carry significant amounts of cargo because she was then dangerously low in the water."

=== Service history ===
Vernon was launched on August 16, 1886, in front of approximately 5000 onlookers. She was named after W. Vernon Booth, one of Alfred Booth's two sons. She was built for Alfred Booth of Chicago, Illinois, and his sons, A. Edeward and W. Vernon Booth, each of whom owned a 1/3 share in her. She received her enrollment on September 1/2, 1886 in Chicago, which would also be her home port. That same year, she replaced the package freighter A. Booth (which sank on August 29, 1886, near Duluth, Minnesota,) in the Duluth–Port Arthur, Ontario, run on Lake Superior. For a time in 1887, Vernon was engaged in the iron ore trade, towing schooner barges between Lake Superior ports and Cleveland, Ohio. While towing scow barges owned by John Pridgeon of Detroit, Michigan, when she ran onto a reef in the Straits of Mackinac, causing damage to the barges. She was sold by the United States Marshals Service to Pridgeon on July 22, 1887, as he had libeled her, due to the damage done to his barges. On August 6, 1887, she was repurchased by Alfred Booth for $23,350; and was then transferred to Booth's Booth Packing Company. That same month, she was chartered by the Northern Michigan Line, in order to replace their steamer Champlain, which burned down in Charlevoix, Michigan, on June 1 of that same year, with the loss of 21 lives.

=== Final voyage ===
Vernon left Chicago, Illinois, for Cheboygan, Michigan, on October 20, 1887, under the command of Captain George Thorpe, making stops along the way at Manitowoc, Wisconsin, Suttons Bay, Michigan, and St. Ignace, Michigan. Reports conflict about the number of crewmen on board, with most reports giving estimates of between 23 and 25. On her return trip, Vernon was bound from Cheboygan for Chicago, and was once again scheduled to make stops at Mackinac Island and several other northern Lake Michigan ports. She left Cheboygan at around 3:00 a.m., accompanied by the package freighter Joseph L. Hurd. The two ships proceeded to Beaver Island, where Vernon boarded passengers and loaded freight, while Joseph L. Hurd headed for Chicago. Vernon departed Beaver Island the following day, and passed Leeland, Michigan, at 1:00 p.m. She made a stop at Glen Haven, Michigan, and later at Frankfort, Michigan. On the evening of October 28, Vernon left Frankfort, and head across Lake Michigan to its Wisconsin shore. At around 10:00 p.m., Vernon encountered a northeast gale, which gradually worsened as she headed across the lake. Eventually, the large waves that made headway increasingly difficult, swamped Vernon, extinguishing her boilers. Now powerless, Vernon sank near Two Rivers, Wisconsin, sometime between 3:00 and 4:00 a.m. on October 29. When Vernon sank, she was carrying a cargo of 400 boxes of fish, 90 tons of pig iron, apples, 2,000 bushels of potatoes, 90,000 barrel staves and other general merchandise.

=== Aftermath ===
Late at night, the same day Vernon sank, the schooner Joseph Page arrived in Milwaukee, Wisconsin; she reported encountering copious amounts of wreckage from a "large, white propeller", with several people clinging to it. The steam barge Superior reported encountering several life rafts and a yawl, which contained survivors who were signalling for assistance. Superior also encountered people floating in the water, wearing life jackets. Captain Moran of Superior identified the wreckage as Vernon's, based upon the gold scrollwork unique to Vernon. The schooners Blazing Star, Horace A. Badger, William Home and the tug Anderson passed through a wreckage field, encountering several corpses. None of the ships that passed through the wreckage stopped to assist the survivors. Eventually, only 19 bodies were recovered; they were laid out in the Two Rivers fire station, which served as a temporary morgue. Initially, it was assumed that fifty people died onboard Vernon. This number was later revised to 36–41 lives, as several passengers embarked and disembarked at the ports where she stopped. The high toll makes Vernon one of the deadliest shipwrecks ever to have occurred in Wisconsin. She was valued at $75,000 (equivalent to $2.31 million in 2024).

Initially, it was believed that no one onboard Vernon survived. However, on October 31, the schooner S.B. Pomeroy which was bound from Chicago, Illinois for Green Bay, Wisconsin discovered a life raft with two men on board. One had died from exposure, meanwhile the other one, 23-year-old Swedish fireman Axel Stone had survived. S.B. Pomeroy transported him to Green Bay, where he recounted the details of the disaster to the local newspaper. Stone claimed that Vernon was heavily overloaded, to the point that less than 6 inches (15 cm) of freeboard remained above the waterline. He reported that due to the excessive load, Vernon's crew were unable to close the gangways.

An inquest held on November 7, 1887, stated that:

The storm of October 29th was not so fierce nor the lake so rough as to prevent the rescue of these bodies. If their perilous condition had been known, the life-saving crew, each and all of the five fishing tugs here, besides many small boats would have gone promptly to their rescue.

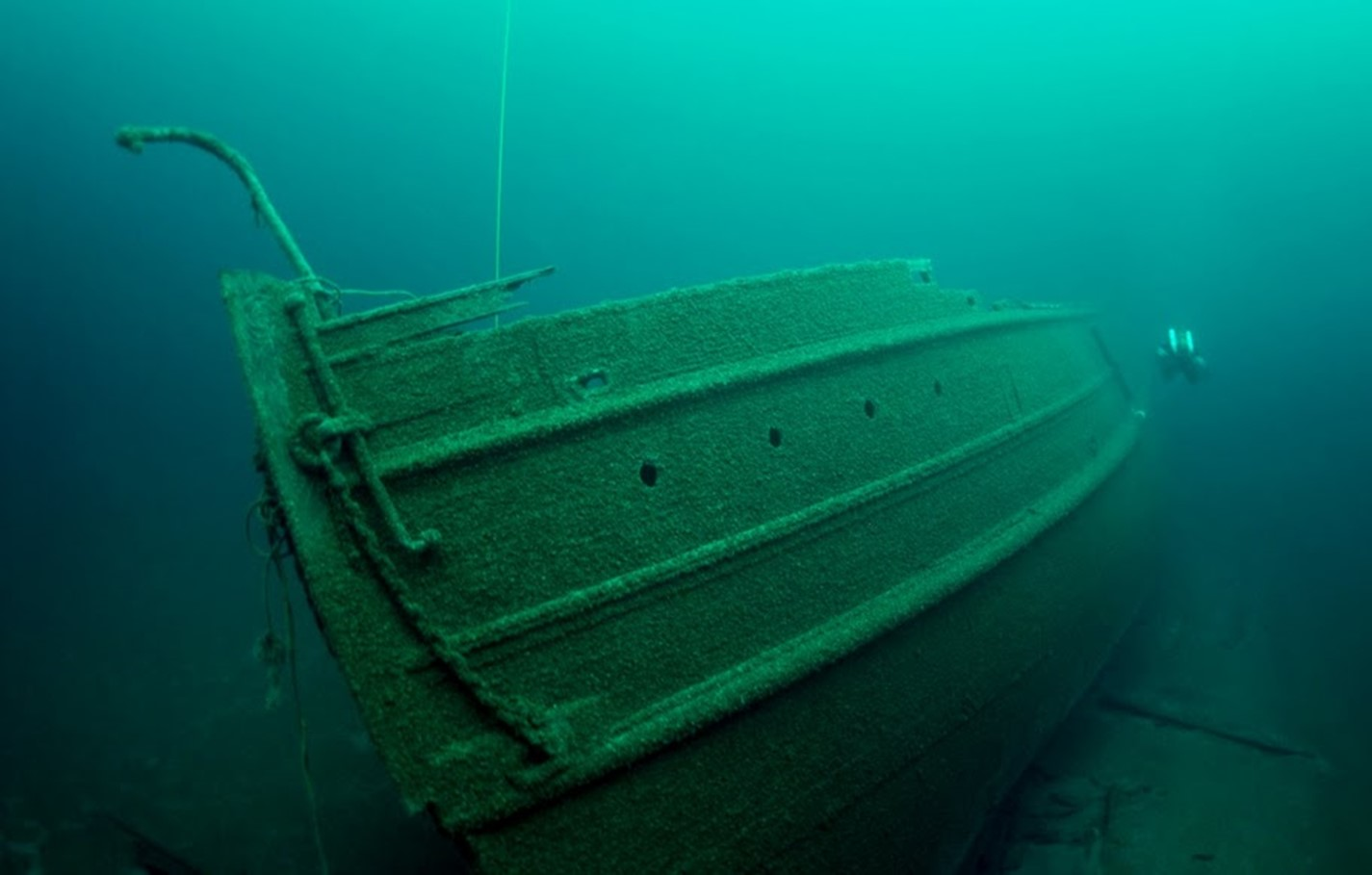
Wreck of Vernon

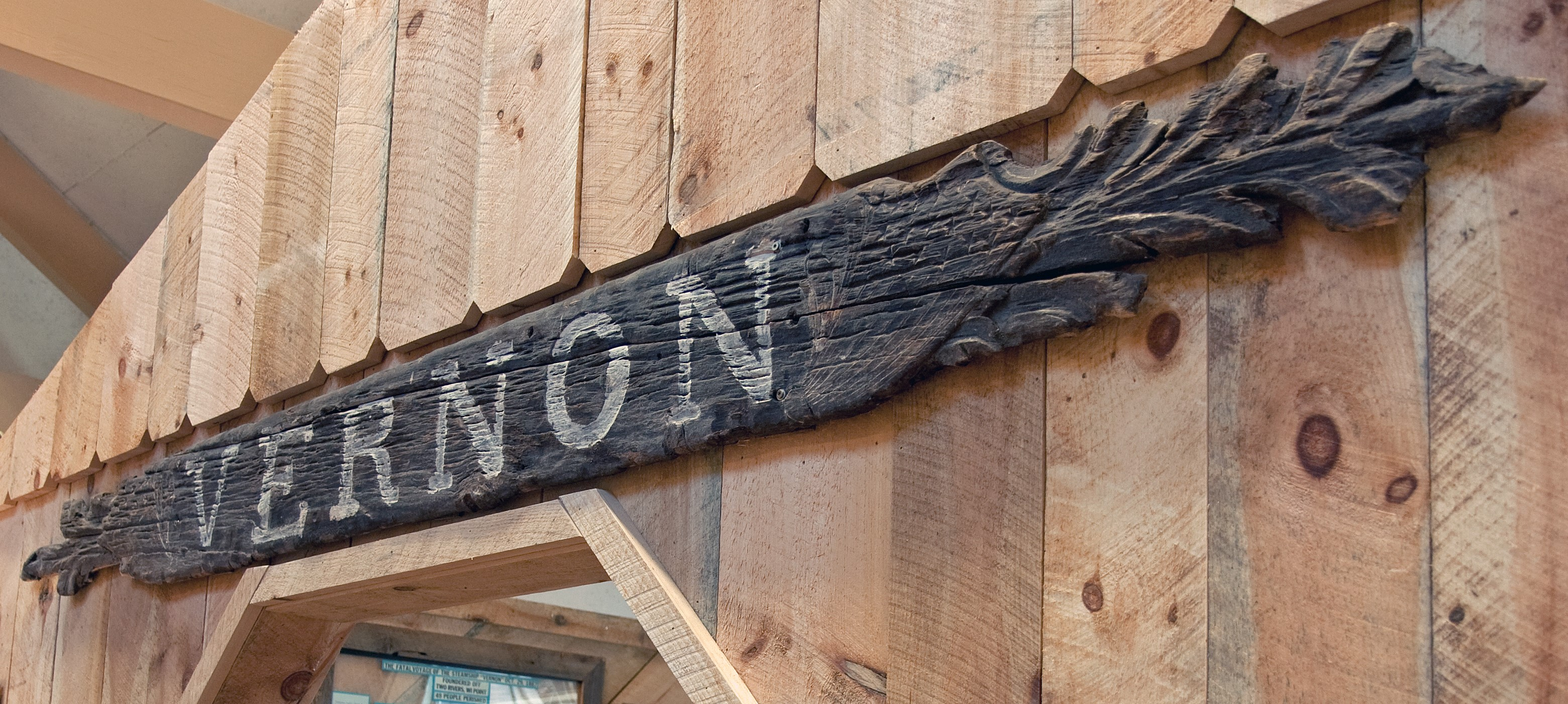
Vernon's name board

As part of the inquest, the captains of Joseph Page and Superior were reprimanded for not making more of an effort to save the survivors.

== Vernon today ==
A wreck, possibly that of Vernon was found in 1908 by two fishermen, 8 miles (12.9 km) north of Two Rivers, Wisconsin, 5 miles (8.0 km) off shore in 300 feet (91.4 m) of water. The wreck of Vernon was located in 1969 by Kent Bellrichard of Milwaukee, Wisconsin. She rests intact in 210 feet (64 m) of water, northeast of Two Rivers. She is keeled over to starboard side. Her pilot house and cabins which broke away when she sank, lie west of her wreck in 160 feet (48.8 m) of water. Her cargo is still intact within her hold. Her gangways are still open, confirming Axel Stone's claims of her crew not being able to close them due to her excessive load. Various artefacts, including her name board are on display at the Rogers Street Fishing Village in Two Rivers.

A monument commemorating eight of the people who died onboard Vernon stands in the Pioneer Rest Calvary Cemetery in Two Rivers.

== Sources ==
- Alpena County George N. Fletcher Public Library (1) (2020). "Booth, A. (1882, Propeller)". Alpena, Michigan: Alpena County George N. Fletcher Public Library.
- Alpena County George N. Fletcher Public Library (2) (2020). "Vernon (1886, Propeller)". Alpena, Michigan: Alpena County George N. Fletcher Public Library.
- National Marine Engineers Beneficial Association of the United States (1909). "American Marine Engineer January, 1909". Washington D.C.: National Marine Engineers Beneficial Association of the United States – via Haithi Trust.
- Bowling Green State University (2010). "Vernon". Bowling Green, Ohio: Bowling Green State University.
- Boyd (1), Richard (2000). "The Dark Voyage of the Propeller Vernon-Part 1" (PDF). Wisconsin: Wisconsin Underwater Archeological Association. Archived from the original (PDF) on November 21, 2003.
- Boyd (2), Richard (2000). "The Dark Voyage of the Propeller Vernon-Part 2" (PDF). Wisconsin: Wisconsin Underwater Archeological Association. Archived from the original (PDF) on June 10, 2004.
- Brinkman, Jim (2007). "36 died after boat left Good Harbor". Leelanau County, Michigan: Leelanau Enterprise. Archived from the original on May 17, 2008.
- Carus, Edward (1887). "Marine Man recalls loss of "Vernon" in 1887". Madison, Wisconsins: Wisconsin Historical Society.
- Donahue, James L. (2021). "Surviving The Vernon Disaster". The Mind of James Donahue.
- Ero, Natasha (2020). "Two Rivers monument honors lives lost in one of Wisconsin's deadliest shipwrecks". Green Bay, Wisconsin: We Are Green Bay. Archived from the original on November 24, 2020.
- GenDisasters (1887). "Two Rivers, WI (Off Shore) Steamer Vernon Sinks In Lake Michigan, Oct 1887". North America: GenDisasters.
- Hanakova, Jitka (2020). "Freighter Vernon". Milwaukee, Wisconsin: Shipwreck Explorers.
- Jarvey, Michele (2007). "Diving the Vernon" (PDF). St. Charles, Missouri: Midwest Scuba Diving. Archived from the original on July 12, 2014.
- Manitowoc County Historical Society (2019). "Remembering the Vernon". Manitowoc County, Wisconsin: Manitowoc County Historical Society.
- Maritime History of the Great Lakes (1) (1887). "Vernon (Propeller), sunk, 29 Oct 1887". Ontario, Canada: Maritime History of the Great Lakes.
- Maritime History of the Great Lakes (2) (1887). "Vernon (Propeller), sunk, 29 Oct 1887". Ontario, Canada: Maritime History of the Great Lakes.
- Meyer, Amy (2015). "Just 1 survivor in 1887 shipwreck near Two Rivers". Manitowoc, Wisconsin: The Herald Times Reporter.
- National Oceanic and Atmospheric Administration (2020). "Wisconsin Shipwreck Coast National Marine Sanctuary Designation-Final Environmental Impact Statement and Final Management Plan" (PDF). Washington D.C.: National Oceanic and Atmospheric Administration.
- Rogers Street Fishing Village (2020). "Welcome to Rogers Street Fishing Village". Two Rivers, Wisconsin: Rogers Street Fishing Village.
- St. Mane, Ted (2010). Lost Passenger Steamships of Lake Michigan. Charleston, South Carolina: The History Press. ISBN 978-1-614232-15-5. "The propeller Vernon of the Northern Michigan Line, foundered during the terrible gale which raged on Lake Michigan yesterday, and it is almost certain that of her crew and list of passengers, numbering over 30, and probably close to 50, not a soul escaped"
- Swayze, David D. (2001). "Great Lakes Shipwrecks-V". Port Huron, Michigan: Boatnerd.
- Wisconsin Shipwrecks (2020). "Vernon (1886)". Madison, Wisconsin: Wisconsin Historical Society.
- Wrecksite (2008). "SS Vernon (+1887)". Affligem, Belgium: Wrecksite.
