= SS Ironsides =

Wooden-hulled American package freighter on Great Lakes service

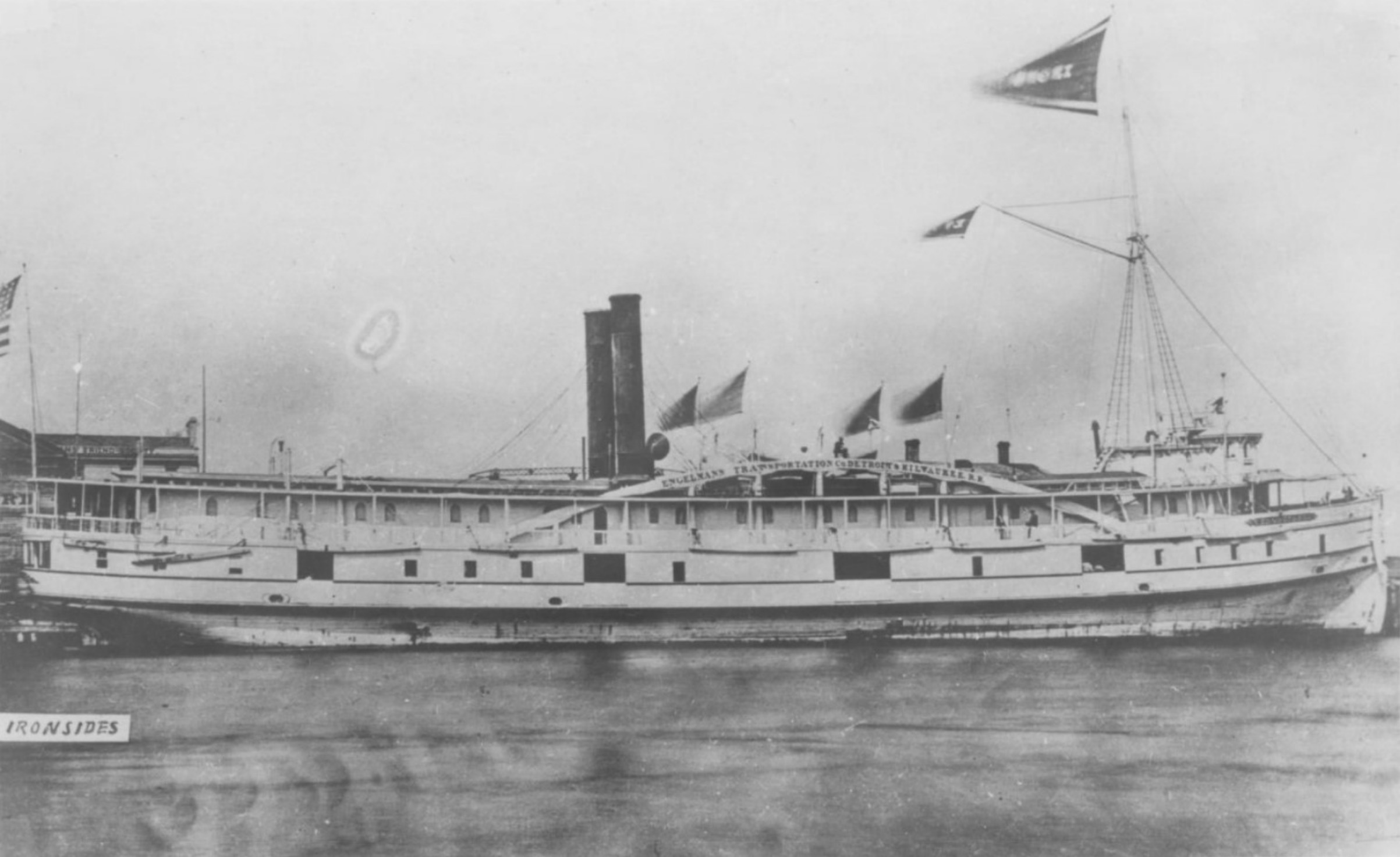
- Ironsides while she was owned by the Englemann Transportation Company

History

United States
- Name: Ironsides
- Owner: John E. Turner (1864–1867); Dwight Scott (1867–1869); Thomas A. Howe (April 30, 1869 – May 10, 1869); Nathan Englemann (May 10, 1869–1873)
- Operator: Cleveland & Lake Superior Line (1864–1867); Englemann Transportation Company (1871–1873)
- Port of registry: Cleveland, Ohio, United States; later Milwaukee, Wisconsin
- Builder: Ira Lafrinier or Quayle & Martin of Cleveland, Ohio
- Launched: July 23, 1864
- In service: 1864
- Out of service: September 15, 1873
- Identification: US official number 12091
- Fate: Sank in a storm on Lake Michigan 43°2′53.88″N 86°19′8.76″W

General characteristics
- Class & type: Package freighter
- Tonnage: 973 GRT; 1,123.75 GRT (after re–measurement)
- Length: 231 feet (70.4 m) LOA; 218.66 feet (66.6 m) LBP
- Beam: 30.75 feet (9.4 m); 38 feet (11.6 m) (with overhanging guards)
- Depth: 12.75 feet (3.9 m)
- Installed power: Engine: 2 × two cylinder 1,284 hp (957 kW) low pressure direct acting engines; Boilers: 2 × firebox boilers
- Propulsion: 2 × 9 feet (2.7 m) 4–bladed fixed pitch propellers

SS Ironsides was a wooden-hulled American package freighter in service between 1864 and 1873. She was built in 1864 in Cleveland, Ohio, by either Ira Lafrinier or Quayle & Martin. She was built for John E. Turner, also of Cleveland, and operated as part of the Cleveland & Lake Superior Line. She had an identical sister ship named Lac La Belle. Ironsides operated between Cleveland and Lake Superior for a number of years, and was sold several times. In 1869, she was sold to Nathan Englemann of Milwaukee, Wisconsin, and operated between Milwaukee and Grand Haven, Michigan. In 1871, she became part of the Englemann Transportation Company.

On the night of September 14, 1873, Ironsides left Milwaukee for Grand Haven with 13,000 bushels of wheat, 500 barrels of flour, 125 barrels of pork, general merchandise, 19 passengers and about 30 crewmen on board. Later that evening, the light breeze that had been blowing became a powerful gale. At 4:00 a.m. the next day, Ironsides began to take on water quickly. After failing to navigate Ironsides into Grand Haven harbour twice, Captain Harry Sweetman decided instead to anchor, and ride out the storm offshore. Later that morning, the water extinguished the fire in Ironsides' boilers. By 11:00 a.m., all people on board had escaped in five lifeboats. Ironsides sank at 12:10 p.m. Three of the five lifeboats capsized, killing roughly 18 to 28 people.

In 1878, pieces of Ironsides' wreck were brought up by fishermen in their nets. In 1887, the Englemann Transportation Company claimed they would raise Ironsides' wreck, however, the salvage never occurred. The wreck was discovered in about 1966 by shipwreck hunter Gene Turner. The wreck lies partially collapsed in between 109 feet (33.2 m) and 122 feet (37.2 m) of water.

== History ==
=== Design and construction ===
Ironsides (US official number 12091) was built in 1864 in Cleveland, Ohio. Sources conflict on who built her; she was built by either Ira Lafrinnier or Quayle & Martin. She had an identical sister ship named Lac La Belle, built by Lafrinnier. Her name stemmed from the metal plating her hull was sheathed in. Her hull contained two watertight bulkheads, and was stiffened with two "hogging arches" which were reinforced with iron. Ironsides had 44 state rooms, which were furnished with chandeliers, damask curtains and colourful carpets.

Ironsides' hull had an overall length 231 feet (70.4 m) and a length between perpendiculars of 218.66 feet (66.6 m) (some source states 218.8 feet (66.7 m) or 219 feet (66.8 m)). Her beam was 30.75 feet (9.4 m) (some sources state 30.7 feet (9.4 m) or 31 feet (9.4 m)) wide. At her main deck, Ironsides had overhanging hull guards, which brought her over all beam to 38 feet (11.6 m). Ironsides' hull was 12.75 feet (3.9 m) (some sources state 12.9 feet (3.9 m) or 14 feet (4.3 m)) deep. She had a gross tonnage of 973 tons.

She was powered by two dual-cylinder 1,284 hp (957 kW) low pressure direct acting engines, designed by J.F. Holloway, and nicknamed "Jack and Jill" by Ironsides' crew. The cylinders of the engine were 34 inches (86.4 cm) in diameter, and had a stroke of 42 inches (110 cm). Steam for the engine was provided by two 21 feet (6.4 m) long and 10 feet (3.0 m) wide firebox boilers with 378 return tubes. Ironsides' engine and boilers were both built by the Cuyahoga Iron Works of Cleveland. She was propelled by two four-bladed fixed-pitch propellers, 9 feet (2.7 m) in diameter.

=== Service history ===
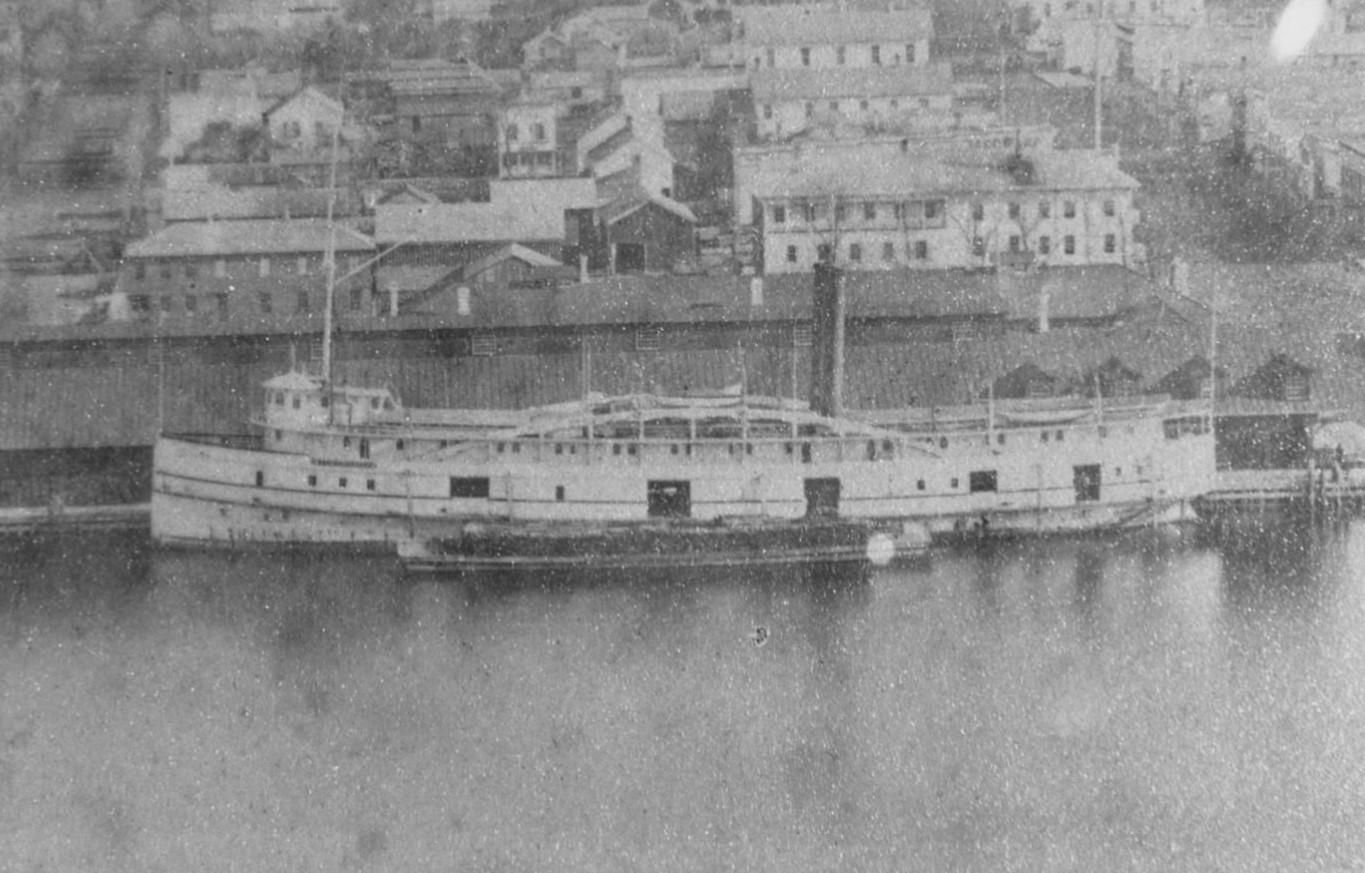
Ironsides in Grand Haven, Michigan

Ironsides was launched at 4:00 p.m. on July 23, 1864. Commissioned by John E. Turner of Cleveland, she operated as part of the Cleveland & Lake Superior Line between Cleveland, Detroit, Michigan, Mackinac Island and several Lake Superior ports. On September 16, Ironsides was enrolled in Cleveland, which was also her home port. Later in her career, her home port was changed to Milwaukee, Wisconsin. Throughout her career, Ironsides was involved in multiple accidents and incidents.

During the American Civil War, Ironsides hauled iron ore from Lake Superior. After the old measurement system was abolished, Ironsides was remeasured in Cleveland on September 20, 1865; under the new system, Ironsides had a gross tonnage of 1123.75 tons. While in Detroit in June 1865, Ironsides was slightly damaged by a fire in her cargo hold. On April 25, 1867, Ironsides was sold to Dwight Scott of Cleveland. She was sold to Thomas A. Howe of Pittsburgh, Pennsylvania, on April 30, 1869; on May 10, that same year, Ironsides was sold to Nathan Englemann of Milwaukee, and travelled between Milwaukee and Grand Haven, Michigan.

Ironsides had three accidents in 1869. While loaded with corn and 15,000 bushels of wheat, one of Ironsides' crankpins broke while travelling off Point Betsie in May 1869. Propelled by only one engine, Ironsides made it to Detroit on May 21, and was repaired in Buffalo, New York. In August, she collided with a dredge in either Milwaukee, or Racine, Wisconsin. In October, she collided with the revenue cutter Andrew Johnson in Milwaukee.

On May 30, 1871, Ironsides became part of the Englemann Transportation Company of Milwaukee, and operated in conjunction with the Detroit, Grand Haven & Milwaukee Railway. On October 15, that same year, Ironsides was damaged in a collision with an unknown propeller-driven steamship in Saginaw Bay. A month later, one of her propellers broke as she was travelling across Lake Michigan. She was laid up for two weeks while the repairs to her propeller and boiler were made. On October 14, 1872, Ironsides' sister ship, Lac La Belle sank in a storm off Racine, Wisconsin. Ironsides collided with the schooner Floretta on December 5, 1872. She was repaired at the Wolf & Davidson shipyard in Milwaukee, in March 1873. The repairs cost $10,000 (equivalent to $238,000 in 2024).

=== Final voyage ===
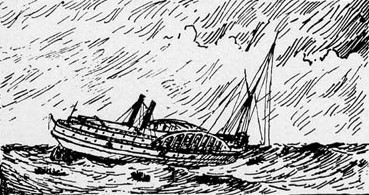
Ironsides' sinking, as illustrated by Samuel Ward Stanton

At 9:30, 9:40 or 9:45 p.m. on September 14, 1873, Ironsides left Milwaukee for Grand Haven under the command of Captain Harry Sweetman, with 13,000 bushels of wheat, 500 barrels of flour, 125 barrels of pork, general merchandise, 19 passengers and about 30 crewmen on board. Throughout the night, the light southwest breeze that had been blowing when she left port became a powerful gale. By 4:00 a.m. on September 15, Ironsides' starboard midships gangways had been smashed in by the waves, causing her to take on water fast.

Captain Sweetman tried to guide her into Grand Haven harbour, but the bad weather pushed Ironsides off course, forcing him to turn back and try again. After failing to guide her into the harbour a second time, Captain Sweetman decided to ride out the storm while anchored offshore. At the time, it was reported that Ironsides "narrowly missed going on the beach".

By 9:00 or 9:30 a.m., Ironsides began to sink; the rising water in her engine room extinguished the fire in her boilers, and her signal of distress was hoisted. As Ironsides' crew were unable to pump her free of water, Captain Sweetman gave the order to abandon ship. The passengers and crew were ready to leave Ironsides 10:30 a.m.; the first lifeboat was launched at 11:20 a.m., and the last was launched at 11:50 a.m. She sank at 12:10 p.m. It was reported that she "settled down stern first, her bow remaining in sight a full minute". Out of the five lifeboats, three of them capsized before they reached land. Between 18 and 28 people died.

In 1878, pieces of Ironsides' wreck were brought up by fishermen in their nets. In 1887, the Englemann Transportation Company claimed they would raise Ironsides' wreck, however, the salvage never occurred.

== Ironsides wreck ==
The wreck of Ironsides was discovered in about 1966 by Illinois shipwreck hunter Gene Turner. Resting 4 miles (6.4 km) west-southwest of the Grand Haven harbour entrance, the stern of her wreck rests in 109 feet (33.2 m) of water, while the bow lies slightly deeper at 122 feet (37.2 m). The hull is split open at the bow. Although both of the "hogging arches" have fallen inward, they remain intact. Ironsides' engines, boilers, propellers and rudder remain in place. Investigation of her wreck revealed evidence that Ironsides did run aground on the beach, likely sustaining damage to the bottom of her hull. Six of her eight propeller blades are missing, indicating that they were turning at a high speed when they were damaged. The wreck is considered an advanced dive due to the depth.

== Sources ==
- Alpena County George N. Fletcher Public Library (2021). "Ironsides (1864, Propeller)". Alpena, Michigan: Alpena County George N. Fletcher Public Library.
- Berry, Sterling (2021). "Ironsides". Detroit, Michigan: Great Lakes Vessel Histories.
- Bowling Green State University (2021). "Ironsides". Bowling Green, Ohio: Bowling Green State University.
- Daily News (1873). "Daily News (Kingston, ON), Sept. 18, 1873". Kingston, Ontario: Daily News.
- Detroit Free Press (1864). "The New Steamer Ironsides". Detroit, Michigan: Detroit Free Press.
- Detroit Free Press (1865). "Marine Disasters for 1865 – Full Particulars of the Disasters for Each Month of the Year – An Unusually Large Record". Detroit, Michigan: Detroit Free Press.
- Donahue, James L. (2021). "Ironsides Couldn't Get Out Of The Storm". United States: James L. Donahue.
- Johnston, J. E. (1957). "Telescope: Volume 6. – Number 4. (April 1957)" (PDF). Detroit, Michigan: Great Lakes Model Shipbuilders' Guild.
- Kohl, Cris (2005). The 100 Best Great Lakes Shipwrecks – Volume II. West Chicago, Illinois: Seawolf Communications. ISBN 978-0-9679-9766-7.
- Maritime History of the Great Lakes (1) (1869). "Ironsides (Propeller), U12091, broke machinery, 1 May 1869". Ontario, Canada: Maritime History of the Great Lakes.
- Maritime History of the Great Lakes (2) (1869). "Ironsides (Propeller), U12091, collision, 1 Aug 1869". Ontario, Canada: Maritime History of the Great Lakes.
- Maritime History of the Great Lakes (3) (1869). "Ironsides (Propeller), U12091, collision, 1 Aug 1869". Ontario, Canada: Maritime History of the Great Lakes.
- Maritime History of the Great Lakes (4) (1869). "Ironsides (Propeller), U12091, collision, 1 Oct 1869". Ontario, Canada: Maritime History of the Great Lakes.
- Maritime History of the Great Lakes (1871). "Ironsides (Propeller), U12091, broke wheel, 1 Nov 1871". Ontario, Canada: Maritime History of the Great Lakes.
- Maritime History of the Great Lakes (1) (1873). "Ironsides (Propeller), U12091, 1 Mar 1873". Ontario, Canada: Maritime History of the Great Lakes.
- Maritime History of the Great Lakes (2) (1873). "Ironsides (Propeller), U12091, sunk, 15 Sep 1873". Ontario, Canada: Maritime History of the Great Lakes.
- Michigan Shipwreck Research Association (2013). "Ironsides". Holland, Michigan: Michigan Shipwreck Research Association.
- Michigan Underwater Preserves (2021). "West Michigan Underwater Preserve". Kalamazoo, Michigan: J.R. Underhill Communications.
- Stanton, Samuel Ward (1895). "Ironsides". New York City: Smith & Stanton.
- Swayze, David (2001). "Great Lakes Shipwrecks – I". Port Huron, Michigan: Boatnerd. Archived from the original on June 15, 2002.
- The Cleveland Leader (1869). "A Steamer Disabled". Cleveland, Ohio: The Cleveland Leader.
