= SS Lac La Belle =

American package freighter

Coordinates: 42°36′09″N 87°31′36″W

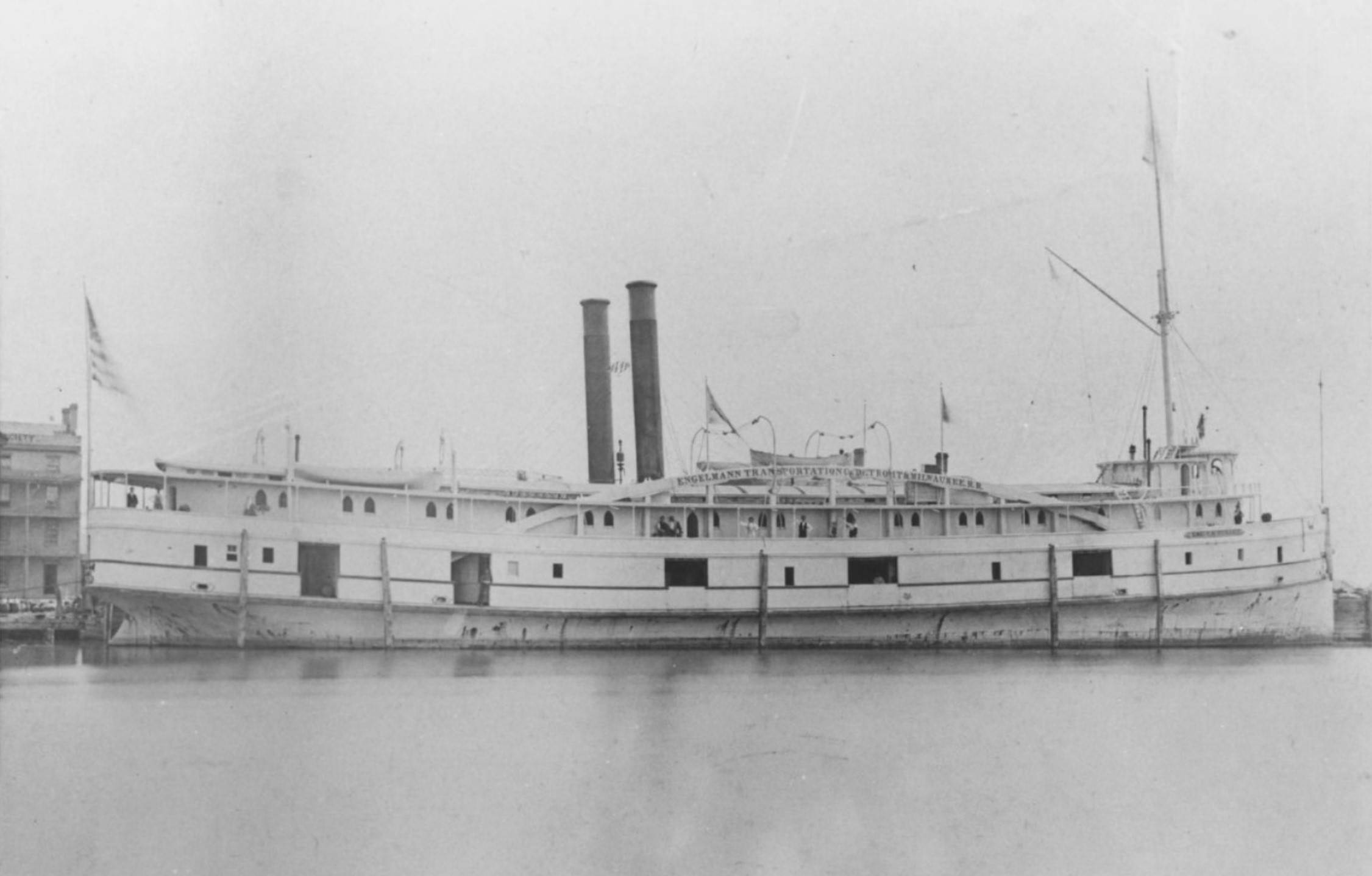
- Lac La Belle as she was owned by the Englemann Transportation Company

History

United States
- Name: Lac La Belle
- Owner: Robert Hanna & Company (1864–1869); Nathan Englemann (1869–1872)
- Operator: Englemann Transportation Company (1870–1872)
- Port of registry: Cleveland, Ohio, United States; later Milwaukee, Wisconsin
- Builder: Ira Lafrinier of Cleveland, Ohio
- Launched: April 30, 1864
- In service: 1864
- Out of service: October 14, 1872
- Identification: US official number 15803
- Fate: Sank in a storm on Lake Michigan

General characteristics
- Class & type: Package freighter
- Tonnage: 872.5 GRT; 1,187.19 GRT (after re-measurement)
- Length: 217.5 feet (66.3 m)
- Beam: 31.5 feet (9.6 m)
- Depth: 13.25 feet (4.0 m)
- Installed power: Engine: 2 × two cylinder high pressure condensing engines; Boilers: 2 × firebox boilers
- Propulsion: 2 × 4–bladed fixed pitch propellers

SS Lac La Belle was a wooden-hulled American package freighter in service between 1864 and 1872. She was built in 1864 in Cleveland, Ohio, by Ira Lafrinier for Hanna & Garretson, also of Cleveland. She had an identical sister ship named Ironsides. Lac La Belle operated between Cleveland and Lake Superior for a number of years, and was sold several times. In 1869, she was sold to Nathan Englemann of Milwaukee, Wisconsin, and operated between Milwaukee and Grand Haven, Michigan. In 1871, she became part of the Englemann Transportation Company. Throughout her career, Lac La Belle was involved in several accidents.

On the night of October 13, 1872, Lac La Belle left Milwaukee for Grand Haven under the command of Captain W. H. Thompson, with about 19,000 bushels of barley, 1,200 barrels of flour, 50 barrels of pork, 25 barrels of whiskey, 20 tons of animal feed, sundries and 53 passengers and crew on board. There was a gale blowing across Lake Michigan. As she was travelling about 25 miles (40.2 km) off Racine, Wisconsin, she began leaking. At around midnight, the rising water in Lac La Belle's engine room extinguished the fire in her boilers. All attempts to save her failed. Next morning, the passengers and crew began abandoning Lac La Belle. She sank about 20 miles (32.2 km) off Racine. One of the lifeboats capsized, resulting in the deaths of eight people.

Her wreck was discovered almost 150 years after her sinking in October 2022, although it was announced in February 2026.

== History ==
=== Design and construction ===
Lac La Belle (US official number 15803) was built in 1864 in Cleveland, Ohio, by Ira Lafrinnier. She was launched on April 30, 1864, and had an identical sister ship named Ironsides, built by either Lafrinnier, or Quayle & Martin.

Lac La Belle's hull was 217.5 feet (66.3 m) (some source states 218 feet (66.4 m) long. Her beam was 31.50 feet (9.6 m) (some sources state 31.5 feet (9.6 m) or wide, while her hull was 13.25 feet (4.0 m) deep. She had a gross tonnage of 872.5 tons.

She was powered by two dual-cylinder high pressure condensing engines; the cylinders of the engine were 34 inches (86.4 cm) in diameter, and had a stroke of 44 inches (110 cm). Steam for the engine was provided by two firebox boilers. Lac La Belle's engine and boilers were both built by the Cuyahoga Steam Furnace Company of Cleveland. She was propelled by two fixed-pitch propellers. She was either the first, or one of the first propeller driven steamships on the Great Lakes with twin funnels.

=== Service history ===
Lac La Belle was commissioned by Robert Hanna & Company of Cleveland, and operated between Cleveland and various Lake Superior ports. On July 8, 1864, she was enrolled in Cleveland, which was also her home port. Later, her home port was changed to Milwaukee, Wisconsin. Throughout her career, Lac La Belle was involved in multiple accidents.

She ran aground at Eagle River, Michigan in 1864. After the old measurement system was abolished, Lac La Belle was remeasured in Cleveland on July 20, 1865. Under the new system, she was 216 feet (65.8 m) (or 216.1 feet (65.9 m)) long, 37 feet (11.3 m) (some sources state 37.15 feet (11.3 m) or 37.48 feet (11.4 m)) wide, 19.58 feet (6.0 m) (or 19.75 feet (6.0 m)) deep, and had a gross tonnage of 1187.19 tons. In that same year, she ran aground while upbound on Lake Superior, sustaining $5,000 (equivalent to $80,000 in 2024) worth of damage. Lac La Belle sustained $400 (equivalent to $7,000 in 2024) worth of damage in September 1866, when one of her propellers broke on Lake Superior.

On November 23, 1866, Lac La Belle was downbound from Ontonagon, Michigan, for Cleveland with a cargo of 385 tons of iron ore, 125 tons of copper ingots, potatoes, cedar posts, about 210 kegs of fish and ship's knees. As she was near Algonac, Michigan, about 2 miles (3.2 km) above the St. Clair Flats, her crew noticed the running lights of the paddle steamer Milwaukee. Lac La Belle was travelling along the American shore of the St. Clair River. After rounding the bend in the river, Lac La Belle blew her whistle once, signaling to Milwaukee that she should head along the Canadian shore of the river. Lac La Belle turned to port, in order to head closer to the shore. At about 6:00 or 6:30 p.m., Milwaukee struck Lac La Belle on her port side, about 40 feet (12.2 m) or 50 feet (15.2 m) from her stem. The force of the collision was so great that for a time, Milwaukee was unable to free herself from the gash. Lac La Belle sank into 25 feet (7.6 m) of water in less than five minutes. Two crewmen from Lac La Belle died. Chief engineer James Evans drowned in the engine room, while steward Henry Rudd was crushed after falling between the two vessels as he was trying to jump over to Milwaukee's deck.

It was reported at the time that "a general unfamiliarity with the St. Clair River by one, if not both pilots probably contributed to the crash". On June 15, 1871, the Detroit Free Press reported that:

On Tuesday nearly five years from the date of the collision, the suit which resulted between the vessels was decided in the United States District Court by Judge Longyear. Assessment of the damage being abrogated and thus both vessels having been at fault. The night was light and the vessels saw each other many hundred feet away. To a landsman it seems a wonder that a collision should ensue under such circumstances, but to a navigator aware of the difficulties in determining the speed at which vessels are approaching, the uncertainty which often attends signals, and the confusion and panic which are apt to prevail when there becomes danger of a collision, the occurrence of these accidents seem less surprising. In the one in question, the officers of both boats undoubtedly believed they did their whole duty and held themselves blameless.

Operations to raise the wreck of Lac La Belle began on July 23, 1869, and were undertaken by the Coast Wrecking Company of New York City. After she was raised, she was taken to Detroit for repairs, which cost $14,000 (equivalent to $292,000 in 2024). On September 24, Nathan Englemann of Milwaukee purchased her at an auction in Detroit for $23,600 (equivalent to $493,000 in 2024). Under Englemann's ownership, she operated between Milwaukee and Grand Haven, Michigan, in conjunction with the Detroit, Grand Haven & Milwaukee Railway.

In November 1869, Lac La Belle ran aground in Grand Traverse Bay. On December 28, 1870, she became part of the Englemann Transportation Company of Milwaukee. The following year on July 4, Lac La Belle missed the Grand Haven harbour entrance and ran aground. After almost six hours, she was freed.

=== Final voyage ===
At 9:00 or 9:30 p.m. on October 13, 1872, Lac La Belle left Milwaukee for Grand Haven under the command of Captain W. H. Thompson, with about 19,000 bushels of barley, 1,200 barrels of flour, 50 barrels of pork, 25 barrels of whiskey, 20 tons of animal feed, sundries and 53 passengers and crew on board. There was a gale blowing across Lake Michigan. As she was travelling about 25 miles (40.2 km) off Racine, Wisconsin, she began leaking. At around midnight, the rising water in Lac La Belle's engine room extinguished the fire in her boilers. All attempts to save her failed. At around 5:00 a.m., the passengers and crew began abandoning Lac La Belle. She sank about 20 miles (32.2 km) off Racine. One of the lifeboats capsized, resulting in the deaths of eight people, while the rest of the lifeboats drifted ashore, or were picked up by passing vessels.

Ironsides sank under similar circumstances, eleven months later along the same route.

== Wreck ==
According to maritime historian Brendon Baillod, Lac La Belle was one of the most sought–after shipwrecks on Lake Michigan, eluding shipwreck hunters for almost 150 years. The poorly known location of the sinking resulted in a large search grid. However, in October 2022, following the discovery of new historical evidence, shipwreck hunters Paul Ehorn and Bruce Bittner of Illinois, succeeded in locating the wreck after a two hour search. Lac La Belle's wreck was located almost exactly 150 years after her sinking. The wreck was surveyed two years later by divers John Scoles and John Janzen, with the discovery being announced on February 13, 2026. Despite the violent nature of Lac La Belle's sinking, her hull remains mostly intact. Her hogging arches remain intact, while her superstructure is absent.

== Sources ==
- Alpena County George N. Fletcher Public Library (2021). "Lac La Belle (1864, Propeller)". Alpena, Michigan: Alpena County George N. Fletcher Public Library.
- Baillod, Brendon (2009). "Fathoms Deep But Not Forgotten: Wisconsin's Historic Shipwrecks – Part II: Racine County". Brendon Baillod and Great Lakes Shipwreck Research.
- Baillod, Brendon (2026). "Pioneer Wreckhunter Finds Lake Michigan Passenger Steamer Lost for 150 Years". Shipwreck World. Madison, Wisconsin.
- Berry, Sterling (2021). "Lac La Belle". Detroit, Michigan: Great Lakes Vessel Histories.
- Bowling Green State University (2021). "Lac La Belle". Bowling Green, Ohio: Bowling Green State University.
- Daily News (1866). "Daily News (Kingston, ON), Nov. 24, 1866". Daily News. Kingston, Ontario.
- Donahue, James L. (2021). "Wreck of the Lac La Belle". United States: James L. Donahue.
- Lee, Robert E. (1974). "Telescope, v. 23, n. 2 (March – April 1974)". Detroit, Michigan: Great Lakes Maritime Institute.
- Maritime History of the Great Lakes (1866). "Lac La Belle (Propeller), U15803, broke her wheel, 1 Sep 1866". Ontario, Canada: Maritime History of the Great Lakes.
- Maritime History of the Great Lakes (1866). "Lac La Belle (Propeller), U15803, sunk by collision, 23 Nov 1866". Ontario, Canada: Maritime History of the Great Lakes.
- Maritime History of the Great Lakes (1868). "Lac La Belle (Propeller), U15803, sunk, 1 May 1868". Ontario, Canada: Maritime History of the Great Lakes.
- Maritime History of the Great Lakes (1869). "Lac La Belle (Propeller), U15803, aground, 1 Nov 1869". Ontario, Canada: Maritime History of the Great Lakes.
- Maritime History of the Great Lakes (1871). "Lac La Belle (Propeller), U15803, aground, 4 Jul 1871". Ontario, Canada: Maritime History of the Great Lakes.
- Maritime History of the Great Lakes (1872). "Lac La Belle (Propeller), U15803, sunk, 4 Oct 1872". Ontario, Canada: Maritime History of the Great Lakes.
- Swayze, David (2001). "Great Lakes Shipwrecks – L". Port Huron, Michigan: Boatnerd. Archived from the original on October 3, 2002.
- The Cleveland Leader (1864). "For Lake Superior". Cleveland, Ohio: The Cleveland Leader.
- Warren, Johnson & Company (1871). "Classification of Lake Vessels and Barges: Adopted by a Board of Marine Inspectors, April 1, 1871". Buffalo, New York: Warren, Johnson & Company.
- Wisconsin Shipwrecks (2021). "Lac La Belle (1864)". Madison, Wisconsin: Wisconsin Historical Society.
