= SS Francis Hinton =

Wooden-hulled steam barge sunk in Lake Michigan

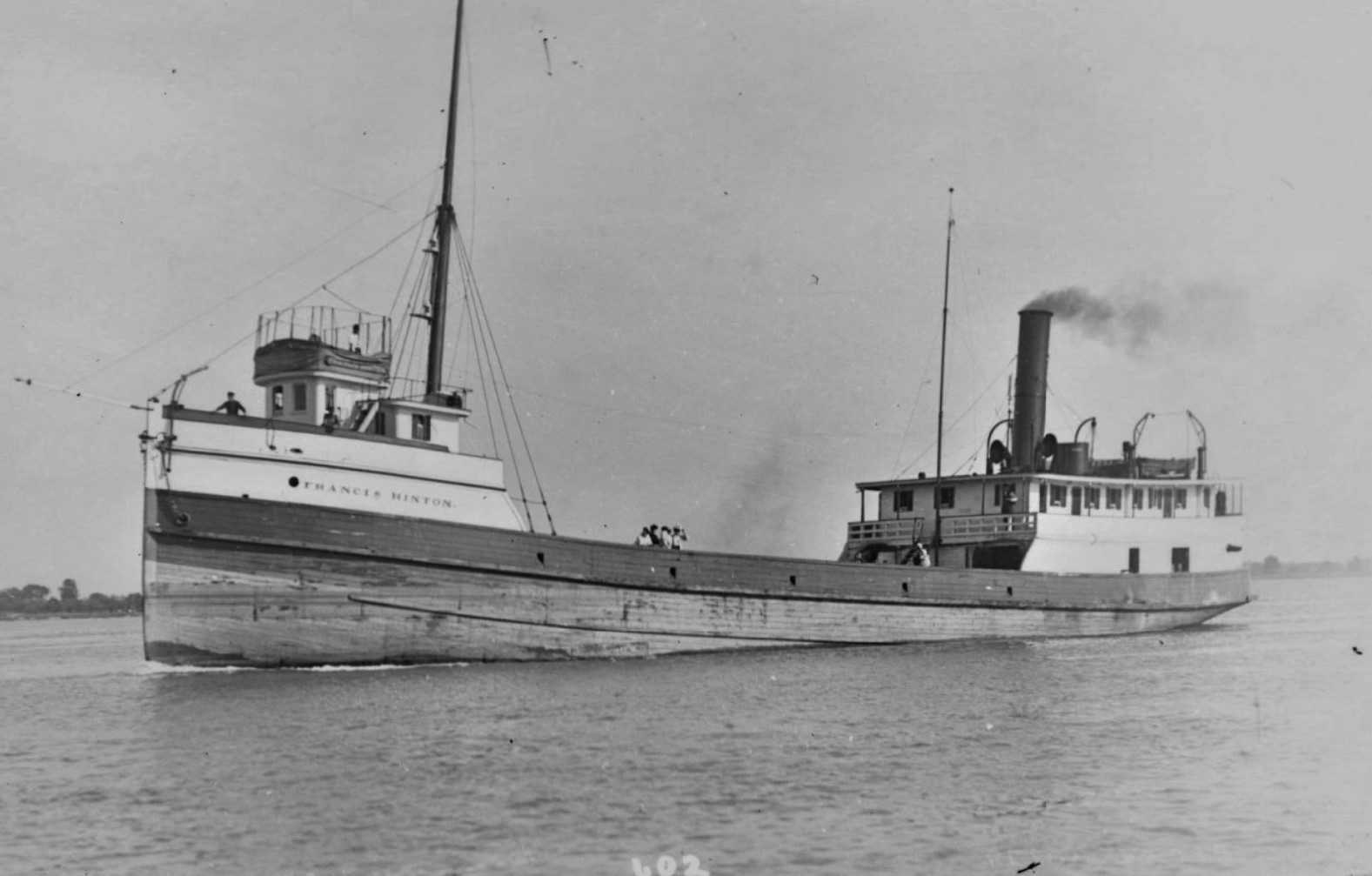
- Francis Hinton prior to her sinking

History

United States
- Name: Francis Hinton
- Owner: George G. Oliver
- Operator: Marine Navigation Company
- Builder: Hanson & Scove
- Launched: 1889
- In service: 1889
- Out of service: November 16, 1909
- Identification: U.S. Registry #120754
- Fate: Wrecked

General characteristics
- Tonnage: 417.34 GRT; 331.07 NRT
- Length: 152.16 ft (46.38 m)
- Beam: 30.75 ft (9.37 m)
- Depth: 10.66 ft (3.25 m)
- Installed power: 385 hp (287 kW) Steeple compound engine

National Register of Historic Places data
FRANCIS HINTON (steamer)
U.S. National Register of Historic Places
Location within Wisconsin Location within the United States
Location	Off the coast of Manitowoc, Wisconsin
Nearest city	Manitowoc, Wisconsin
Coordinates	44°06.67′N 087°37.876′W
Built	1889
Architect	Hanson & Scove
Architectural style	Steam barge
NRHP reference No.	96001457
Added to NRHP	December 16, 1996

SS Francis Hinton was a wooden-hulled steam barge that sank in a gale off the coast of Manitowoc, Wisconsin, on Lake Michigan in 1909 while heavily laden with a cargo of lumber. On December 16, 1996, the wreck of the Francis Hinton was listed on the National Register of Historic Places.

== History ==
Francis Hinton (Official number 120754) was built in 1889 by Danish immigrants Jasper Hanson and Hans Scove (collectively known as Hanson & Scove) in Manitowoc for Horatio Truman and George Cooper of Manitowoc. Her wooden hull was 152.16 feet (46.38 m) long, her beam was 30.75 feet (9.37 m) wide, and her hull was 10.66 feet (3.25 m) wide. She had a gross register tonnage of 417.34 tons, and a net register tonnage of 331.07 tons. She was powered by a 385-horsepower (287 kW) Steeple compound engine that was built by the Manistee Iron Works of Manistee, Michigan, and a single boiler. Her listed capacity was 550.000 board feet (1.29786 m^{3}). She had an Inland Lloyd's rating of A1, and was valued at $35.000 in 1890.

In 1891 the Francis Hinton was sold to the Wisconsin Dredge & Dock Company of Manitowoc. In 1897 the Francis Hinton was sold to James A. Calbick of Chicago, Illinois. In 1899 the Francis Hinton was sold to Ausin A. Canavan of Chicago. In 1902 she was sold to Marine Navigation Company of Marine City, Michigan. On April 18, 1904, the Francis Hinton had her tonnage changed to 397 gross register tons, and 273 net register tons. On August 25, 1905, the Francis Hinton had a collision with the steamer Binghamton near Peche Island in the Detroit River.

=== Final voyage ===
On November 16, 1909, the Francis Hinton left Manistique, Michigan, for Chicago, heavily laden with a cargo of lumber. After encountering a gale, her crew discovered that she was taking on water and decided to try and get her to the safety of Two Rivers Harbor. After the water that leaked into her hull extinguished the fire in her boiler, the Francis Hinton was left immobile. Her crew dropped her anchor, but the large waves kept on pounding her hull and letting water in. Eventually, her captain ordered her anchor line cut, and she drifted ashore. The Two Rivers Lifesaving determined that the seas were too rough to attempt to rescue the Francis Hinton's crew. Her crew eventually deployed a yawl and made it to shore safely. Eventually, the Francis Hinton beached in Maritime Bay, about 1.9 miles (3.1 km) northeast of the Manitowoc River. A day after she wrecked, the Francis Hinton's crew, and the lifesaving crew stripped her of everything of value on board.

== The wreck ==
The remains of the Francis Hinton were rediscovered by sports divers in 1987. Her remains lie broken, and partially scattered in about 15 feet (4.6 m) of water. The wreckage consists of her bilge, her boiler, her four-bladed propeller. Also on the site are the remains of her Steeple compound engine. Visibility at the site is usually about 10 feet (3.0 m). Due to her shallow depth, her wreck has received a lot of damage from ice and waves. The wreck of the Francis Hinton lies near the wreck of the tugboat Arctic.
