= F. J. King (schooner) =

19th-century Great Lakes schooner

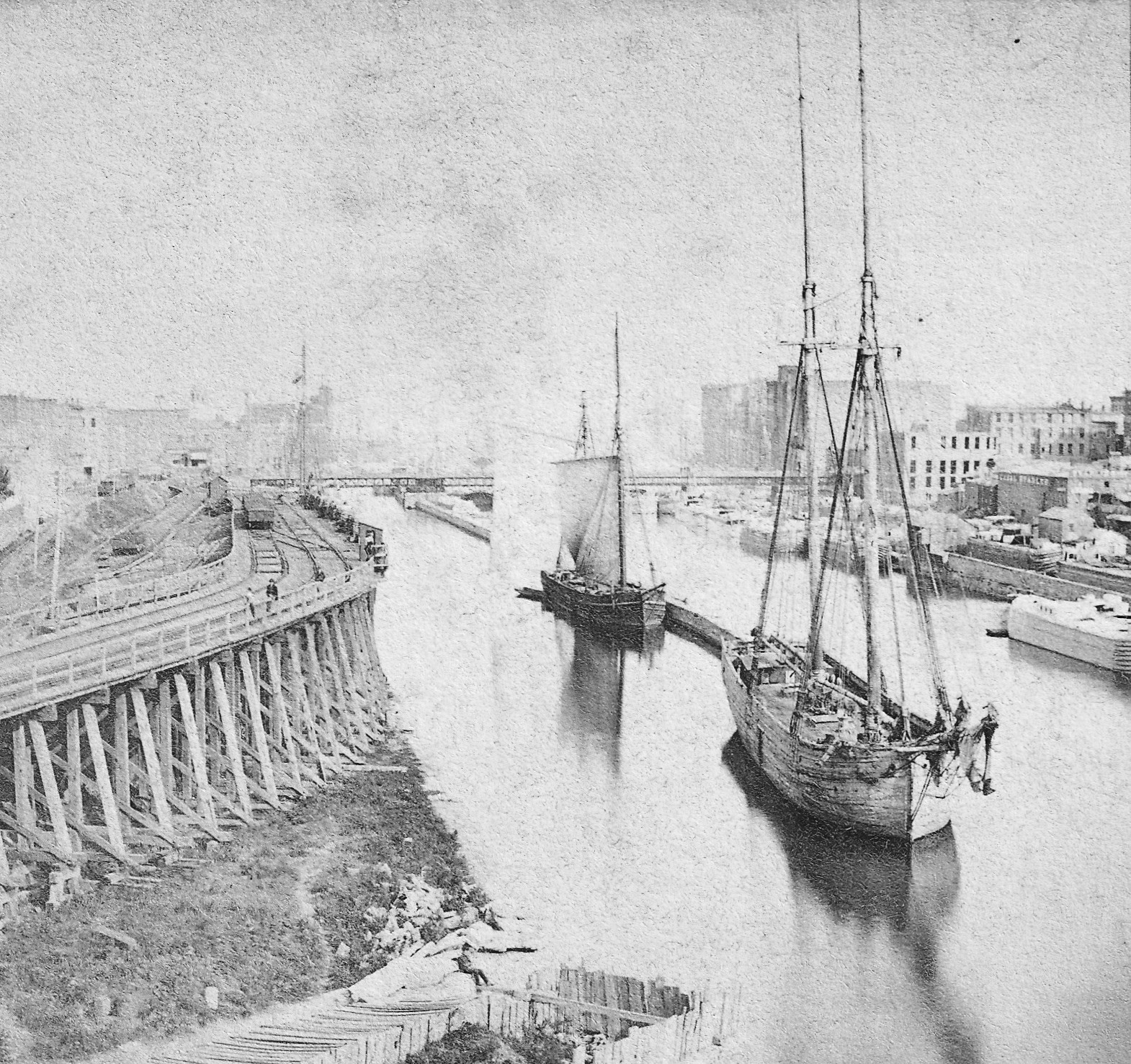
- F. J. King (right) in her original configuration

History

United States
- Name: F. J. King
- Owner: William Griffin & J. S. Dunham
- Builder: George R. Rogers, Toledo, Ohio
- Launched: 16 June 1867
- Out of service: 15 September 1886
- Identification: US official number 9299
- Fate: Sank in a storm on Lake Michigan; 45°04.568′N 86°59.588′W

General characteristics
- Class & type: Schooner
- Tonnage: 280.55 GRT; 266 NRT
- Length: 144 feet (43.9 m)
- Beam: 26.2 feet (8.0 m)
- Depth: 12 feet (3.7 m)

National Register of Historic Places data
F. J King Shipwreck (Schooner)
U.S. National Register of Historic Places
Location within Wisconsin Location within the United States
Location	Near Liberty Grove, Wisconsin
Coordinates	45°04.568′N 86°59.588′W
MPS	Great Lakes Shipwreck Sites of Wisconsin MPS
NRHP reference No.	100013253
Added to NRHP	29 July 2026

F. J. King was an American schooner built in 1867. She operated on the Great Lakes for 19 years, before sinking in a storm on Lake Michigan, on 15 September 1886, while laden with iron ore. Her wreck was located nearly 139 years after her loss, on 28 June 2025, in 137 feet (41.8 m) of water near Cana Island, by a Wisconsin archaeological group.

== History ==
F. J. King (US official number 9299) was a wooden schooner, built by master shipwright George R. Rogers in Toledo, Ohio, in 1867. Her hull was 144 feet (43.9 m) in length, 26.2 feet (8.0 m) in beam, and 12 feet (3.7 m). She had a gross register tonnage of 280.55 tons, and a net register tonnage of 266. She was launched on 16 June 1867. Although built to fit within the confines of the Welland Canal, she was found to be too long, resulting in the removal of her stern's corners in 1869, to facilitate her passage. She was shortened by 3 feet (0.9 m) a year later.

She lost her bowsprit on Lake Erie, on 2 November 1871, eventually running aground at the Black River.

A third mast was installed in 1885.

== Final voyage ==
In the early hours of 15 September 1886, F. J. King was headed from Escanaba, Michigan, to Chicago, Illinois, under the command of Captain William Griffin, with a cargo of iron ore. While off the Door Peninsula, she ran into a southwest gale, with 8–10-foot (2.4–3.0 m) waves, resulting in her aging hull springing a leak. The crew attempted to pump the water out of her hull, which proved unsuccessful. Eventually, Griffin gave the order to abandon the sinking schooner, and the crew boarded the schooner's yawl. At approximately 02:00, as the crew rowed towards the shore, they witnessed F. J. King sink bow-first, her aft deckhouse being blown about 50 feet (15.2 m) into the air as she went down. The crew was picked up by the schooner La Petite, which transported them to Baileys Harbor, Wisconsin.

== Wreck ==
The wreck of F. J. King was located on 28 June 2025, nearly 139 years after her loss, by the Wisconsin Underwater Archaeology Association, a group led by maritime historian Brendon Baillod. She was located in 137 feet (41.8 m) of water, near Baileys Harbor. She was discovered after a two-hour search of the targeted area suggested by historical sources from Baillod's research. Over the previous decades, she had been one of the most highly sought-after shipwrecks on Lake Michigan, with a dive club issuing a $1,000 reward for her discovery in the 1970s. Most wooden vessels laden with ore sustained significant damage upon impacting the lake bottom, but F. J. King's hull remains mostly intact.

The wreck was listed on the National Register of Historic Places on 29 July 2026.
