= Arctic (1881 tug) =

Tugboat used in the Great Lakes of North America

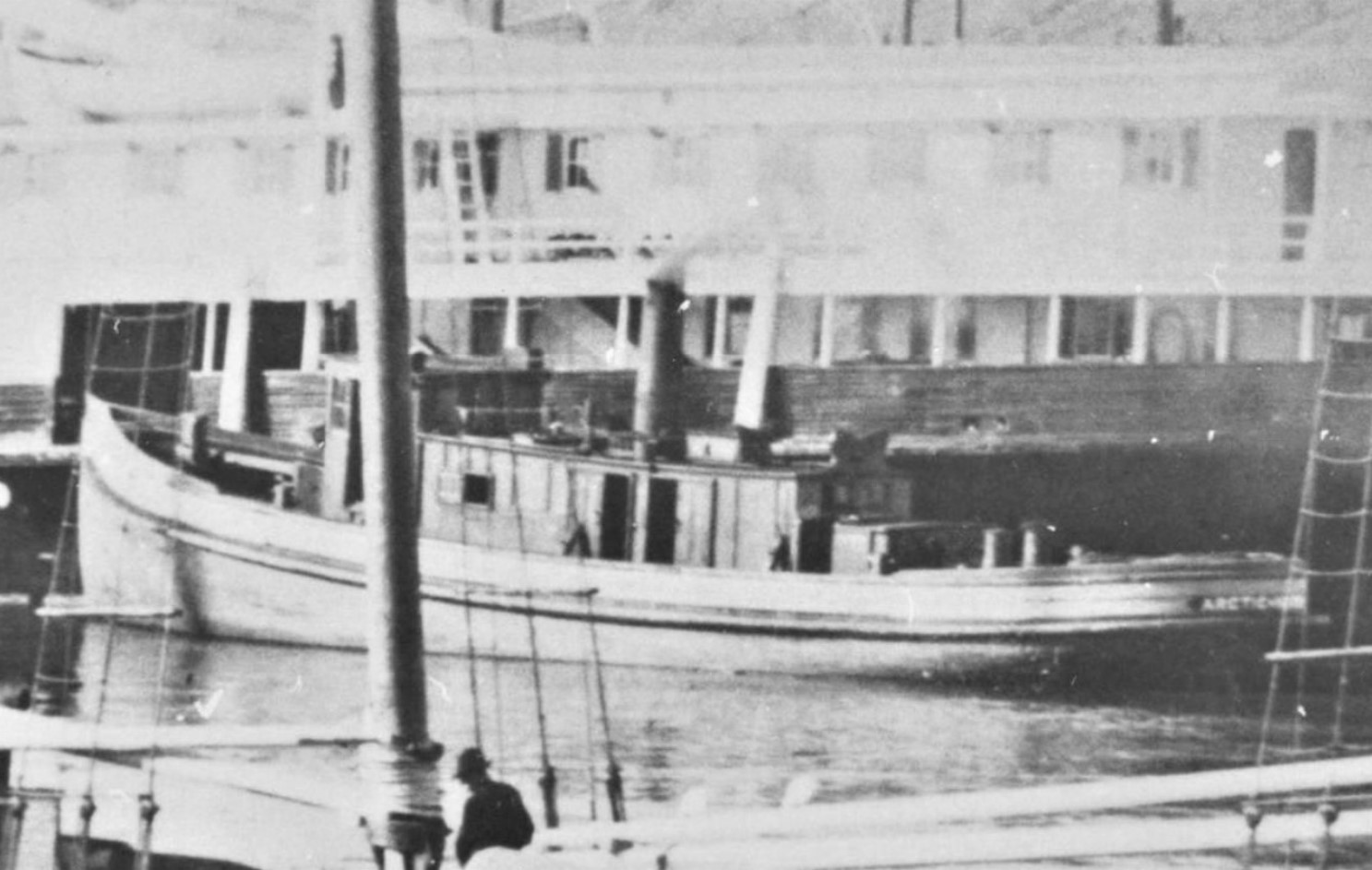
- Arctic in Manitowoc, Wisconsin, c. 1888

History

United States
- Name: Arctic
- Builder: Rand & Burger
- Launched: 1881
- In service: 1881
- Out of service: January 17, 1930
- Fate: Disassembled, beached, and abandoned by January 17, 1930

General characteristics
- Type: Tugboat
- Tonnage: 52 GRT; 26 NRT
- Length: 64.42 ft (19.64 m)
- Beam: 18 ft (5.5 m)
- Depth: 9 ft (2.7 m)
- Installed power: 560 hp (420 kW) non-condensing engine
- Arctic (tug) Shipwreck
- U.S. National Register of Historic Places
- Location within Wisconsin Location within the United States
- Location: 1.5 miles northeast of the Manitowoc Breakwater Light
- Nearest city: Manitowoc, Wisconsin
- Coordinates: 44.11405°N 87.63115°W
- Built: 1881
- Architect: Rand & Burger
- Architectural style: Tugboat
- NRHP reference No.: 100002612
- Added to NRHP: June 22, 2018

Arctic was a wooden-hulled tugboat that worked on the Great Lakes of North America from 1881 to 1930. In 1930 the Arctic was stripped of her machinery, and abandoned at Manitowoc, Wisconsin. On June 22, 2018, the remains of the Arctic were listed on the National Register of Historic Places.

== History ==
The Arctic was built in 1881 by Rand & Burger of Manitowoc, Wisconsin. Her hull was 64.42 feet (19.64 m) long, her beam was 18 feet (5.5 m) and her hull was 9 feet (2.7 m) wide. She had a gross register tonnage of 52 tons, and a net register tonnage of 26 tons.

She was built as an ice breaking and harbour tug for the Goodrich Transportation Company. The Arctic's hull was exceptionally strong and durable, this meant that she could not only work at the harbor, she also worked as a wreaking tug assisting stranded vessels stranded on shoals and/or stuck in ice. In the summer, the Arctic was stationed at Manitowoc, Wisconsin, and in the winter she was stationed at Milwaukee, Wisconsin.

In the summer of 1898 the Arctic was taken to the Burger & Burger shipyard for a hull extension and complete overhaul. Her hull was extended by twelve feet. Her new length was 76.5 feet (23.3 m), and her new gross register tonnage was 71 tons.

November 18, 1919 the Arctic was towing the McMullen & Pitz dredge Algoma, along with two dump scows. The vessels encountered bad weather off Cleveland, Wisconsin, between Sheboygan, Wisconsin and Manitowoc, Wisconsin. Eventually, the Algoma was swamped by a large wave, and sank into 85 feet (26 m) of water after her crew of five made it aboard the Arctic.

From 1923 to 1925 the Arctic was stationed at Chicago, Illinois. While in Chicago, she accompanied Goodrich steamers such as the Christopher Columbus and the Virginia.

== Later history ==
As she aged, the Arctic required repair and overhaul more frequently. Eventually, the Goodrich Transportation Company realized that repairing the Arctic would cost more than a new tug. The Arctic was taken apart, and beached north of Manitowoc harbor. On January 17, 1930 the Arctic's enrollment documents were surrendered, declaring her abandoned.

In 1930 an article appeared in the Manitowoc Herald-Times talking about the Arctic:

To recount the items of service this craft has rendered throughout its life, would fill volumes-- its responses to the four blasts of vessels on the lake in need of help; its assistance to grounded boats; its welcome stream of water on dock property being destroyed by flames; its charges into ice jams that threatened destruction of boats and bridges; and breaking of ice that enabled navigation to continue—all are legion in number, and no man can recount them all.

== The Arctic today ==
The remains of Arctic lie 1.5 miles (2.4 km) northeast of the Manitowoc Harbor light, partially covered by sand 10 to 15 feet (3.0 to 4.6 m) of water. She lies in two sections 800 feet (240 m) apart. The southern section consists of the boiler and the bilge. The northern section consists of a partially intact upper hull and the stempost. Her wreck lies near to the wreck of the steam barge Francis Hinton.
