= SS Milwaukee (1868) =

American steamship launched in 1868

Coordinates: 42°44′5.4″N 86°54′9″W

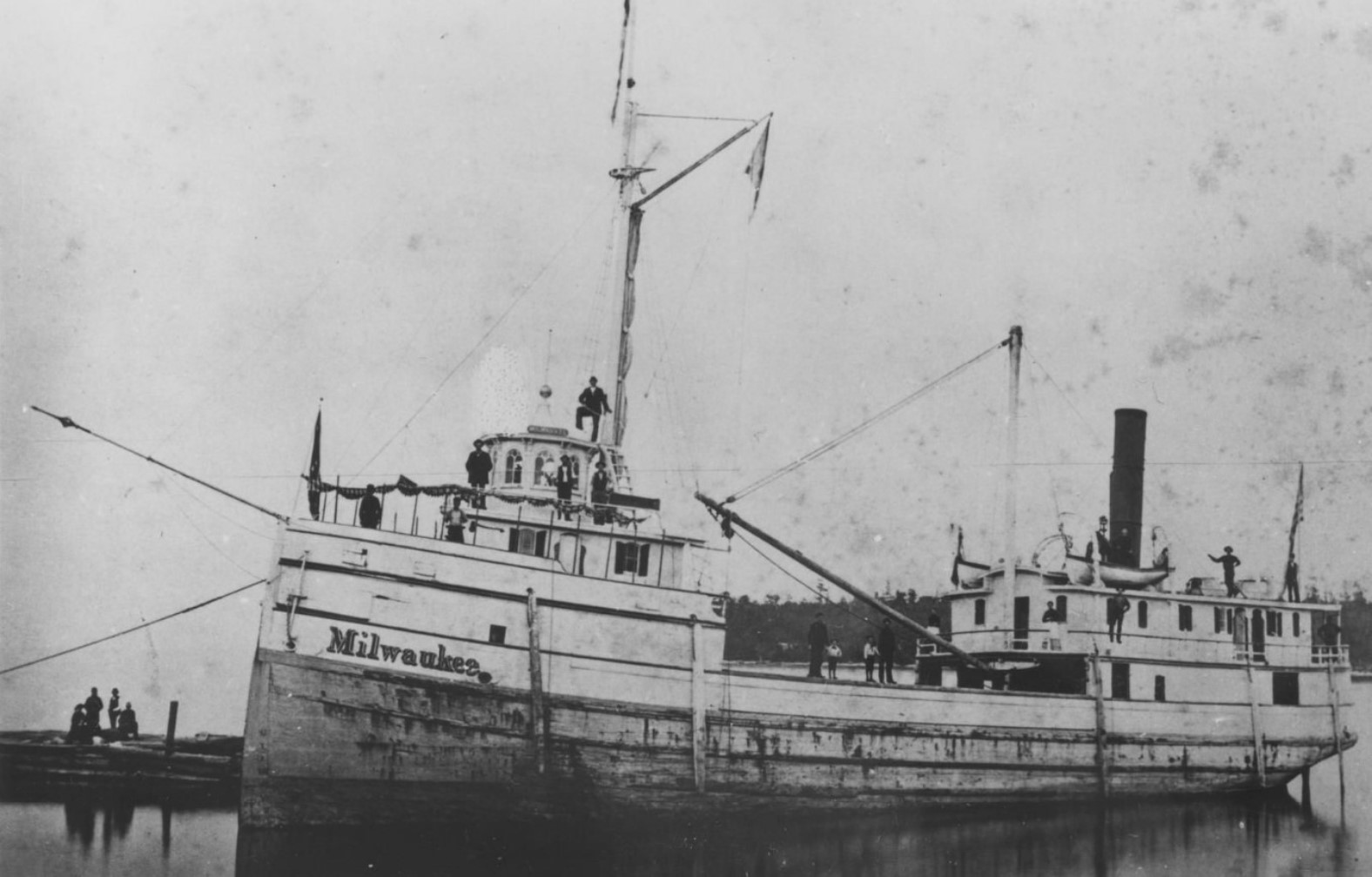
- The only known photo of Milwaukee following her rebuild in 1883

History

United States
- Name: Milwaukee
- Namesake: Milwaukee
- Owner: Northern Transportation Company (1868–1876); Philo Chamberlain (1876–1876); Northern Transit Company (1876–1881); Giles M. Wing & James W. Morgan (1881–1881); E.J. Wing & G.E. Morgan (1881–1882); E.J. Wing, C.E. Morgan, & William H. Harford (1882–1883); Lyman G. Mason (1883–1886)
- Builder: A.C. Keating of Ogdensburg, New York
- In service: 1868
- Out of service: July 8, 1886
- Identification: US official number 17984
- Fate: Sank in a collision on Lake Michigan
- Notes: Wreck discovered June 2023

General characteristics
- Class & type: Canaller (1868–1883); Steam barge (1883–1886)
- Tonnage: 419.11 GRT (1868–1883); 279.79 GRT (1883–1886, after re-measurement); 192.09 NRT (1883–1886)
- Length: 135.5 feet (41.3 m)
- Beam: 26.1 feet (8.0 m)
- Depth: 10.9 feet (3.3 m)
- Installed power: Engine: 1 × 300 hp (220 kW) single cylinder marine steam engine
- Propulsion: 1 × fixed pitch propeller

SS Milwaukee was a wooden-hulled American steam barge in service between 1866 and 1886. Originally a canaller, she was built in 1868 in Ogdensburg, New York, by A.C. Keating, for the Northern Transportation Company of Cleveland, Ohio. Designed with the explicit purpose to traverse the locks of the Welland Canal, Milwaukee spent her early career shuttling cargo between Ogdensburg, and Chicago, Illinois, while routinely making several stops in between. She was sold several times, and was involved in multiple accidents between 1868 and 1883. In early 1883, she was sold to lumberman Lyman G. Mason of Muskegon, Michigan, who had her reconstructed as a steam barge for the transport of lumber to Chicago.

Late in the afternoon on July 8, 1886, Milwaukee left Chicago, bound for Muskegon, following a lumber delivery. Despite clement weather, visibility across Lake Michigan was impaired by smoke from several forest fires. A few hours later, the crew of Milwaukee sighted the lights of the Chicago-bound steam barge C. Hickox. A thick fog suddenly descended on the lake, obscuring both vessels, and leading to the lack of reduced speed required to avert a collision. Following a sudden turn, C. Hickox made a sudden turn, crashing into the side of Milwaukee. Two hours after the collision, Milwaukee sank, with only a single fatality.

The location of Milwaukee's wreck remained unknown for almost 137 years, until it was located by the Michigan Shipwreck Research Association, resting in 360 feet (109.7 m) of water, 40 miles (64.4 km) from Holland, Michigan, significantly intact. The discovery of the wreck was publicly announced on March 23, 2024.

She remains upright and completely intact with collision damage to the port bow. Her pilothouse and mast remain in place as well.

== Sources ==
- "A New Steamer". Chicago, Illinois: Chicago Evening Post. 1868 – via Newspapers.com.
- "Milwaukee". Bowling Green, Ohio: Bowling Green State University. 2024.
- "Milwaukee (1868, Propeller)". Alpena, Michigan: Alpena County George N. Fletcher Public Library. 2024.
- Michigan Shipwreck Research Association (2024). "Milwaukee (steam barge)". Holland, Michigan: Michigan Shipwreck Research Association.
