= National Register of Historic Places listings in Manitowoc County, Wisconsin =

Location of Manitowoc County in Wisconsin

This is a list of the National Register of Historic Places listings in Manitowoc County, Wisconsin. It is intended to provide a comprehensive listing of entries in the National Register of Historic Places that are located in Manitowoc County, Wisconsin. The locations of National Register properties for which the latitude and longitude coordinates are included below may be seen in a map.

There are 40 properties and districts listed on the National Register in the county.

This National Park Service list is complete through NPS recent listings posted November 13, 2025.

== Current listings ==
	Name on the Register	Image	Date listed	Location	City or town	Description
1	Alaska Shipwreck (Scow Schooner)	Alaska Shipwreck (Scow Schooner)	January 17, 2017 (#100000518)	4.2 miles (6.8 km) NE of Two Rivers, in Lake Michigan; 44°10′08″N 87°28′12″W	Two Rivers	90-foot wooden scow-schooner built by Smith Neville, Sr. in Sheboygan in 1869. Mainly hauled lumber on Lake Michigan. Pushed ashore by a gale March 23, 1879, while carrying wheat to Ahnapee her remains now lie in 5 feet of water.
2	Arctic Shipwreck (tug)	Arctic Shipwreck (tug)	June 22, 2018 (#100002612)	1.5 miles (2.4 km) NE of the Manitowoc Breakwater Light, in Lake Michigan; 44°06′51″N 87°37′52″W	Manitowoc vicinity	76.5 foot harbor tug, built in 1881 by Rand and Burger of Manitowoc with a wooden hull and a steam-screw drive. Escorted Goodrich steamers and other vessels around Manitowoc, Milwaukee and Chicago harbors for 49 years. Then stripped and abandoned in 1930.
3	Central Park Historic District	Central Park Historic District	December 1, 2000 (#00001069)	Roughly bounded by 19th St., Adams St., 16th St. and Jefferson St. 44°08′56″N 87°34′05″W	Two Rivers	A fairly intact part of the old business district, with contributing structures built from 1850 to 1948. Buildings are significant for commerce, education, and social history, and many are fine examples of various 19th and early 20th century architecture styles.
4	CONTINENTAL shipwreck (bulk carrier)	CONTINENTAL shipwreck (bulk carrier)	January 14, 2009 (#08001330)	One mile north of Rawley Point; 44°13′50″N 87°30′31″W	Two Rivers	This 244-foot wood-hulled steam screw bulk carrier was built 1882 in Cleveland. She hauled iron and coal until December of 1904, when in a snowstorm she ran onto a sandbar off Rawley Point, while trying to reach dry dock in Manitowoc for the winter.
5	Eighth Street Historic District	Eighth Street Historic District	March 17, 1988 (#88000215)	Roughly bounded by Buffalo St., Eighth and Seventh Sts., Hancock St., and Tenth, Ninth and Quay Sts. 44°05′25″N 87°39′31″W	Manitowoc	Manitowoc's old downtown, with contributing structures built from the 1850s to 1930s. Many first stories are remodeled, but the upper stories are intact and historic.
6	Floretta (canaller) Shipwreck	Floretta (canaller) Shipwreck	October 20, 2014 (#14000877)	11 mi. SE. of Manitowoc; 43°57′14″N 87°32′12″W	Centerville	Built in 1867 and sized to carry a maximum load through the Welland Canal locks, the Floretta carried grain and ore up and down the Great Lakes. She sank in a storm in 1885 and lies wrecked under 180 feet of water.
7	Francis Hinton (steamer)	Francis Hinton (steamer)	December 16, 1996 (#96001457)	Address restricted 44°06′40″N 87°37′53″W	Manitowoc	152-foot wooden steambarge built in Manitowoc by Danish immigrants Hanson and Scove in 1889. She was broken up in November 1909, hauling lumber from Manistique to Chicago.
8	Frenchside Fishing Village	Frenchside Fishing Village	January 6, 1987 (#86003580)	Twenty-first, Jackson, East, Sixteenth, Harbor, and Rogers Sts. 44°09′01″N 87°33′46″W	Two Rivers	The part of Two Rivers identified with commercial fishing for 167 years - a longer continuous span than any other city on the Great Lakes. Structures include French-Canadian homes as old as 1855, fish sheds, ice houses, smoke houses, and net-drying racks.
9	GALLINIPPER Shipwreck (Schooner)	GALLINIPPER Shipwreck (Schooner)	December 28, 2010 (#10001091)	9.5 miles northeast of Hika Park in Lake Michigan; 43°45′53″N 87°41′47″W	Centerville	This early 95-foot wooden schooner was built in 1832 in Ohio for Michael Dousman. She traded goods from out East for furs from Wisconsin, carried passengers, and had various mishaps. Finally sank in a gale in 1851, and now sits largely intact under 210 feet of water.
10	Green Bay Road Bridge	Green Bay Road Bridge	August 3, 1998 (#98000877)	Mill St. at Manitowoc R. 44°05′46″N 87°42′06″W	Manitowoc Rapids	Early, one-lane single-span Pratt through truss iron bridge across the Manitowoc River, 150 feet long by 15 feet wide, built by the Wisconsin Bridge and Iron Company of Milwaukee in 1887.
11	Carl Gottlieb Heins House	Carl Gottlieb Heins House	May 6, 1998 (#98000433)	227 Fremont St. 43°54′44″N 88°01′56″W	Kiel	1906 brick-clad home in Colonial Revival style, with a gambrel roof shingled with ornamental pressed sheet-metal. Heins was a German immigrant who opened a general store in Kiel in 1861, helped found Kiel Woodenware, Kiel Manufacturing, and the Kiel State Bank, and served in various civic roles.
12	Home (schooner)	Home (schooner)	December 28, 2010 (#10001092)	10 miles southeast of Manitowoc; 43°56′50″N 87°33′17″W	Centerville	Small lakeshoring schooner built in Portland, Ohio in 1843. Initially hauled grain and merchandise on Lake Erie; later lumber on Lake Michigan. Sank in 1858 after a collision with another schooner.
13	Island Village Site	Island Village Site	November 21, 1994 (#94001331)	Address Restricted; 44°03′30″N 88°02′09″W	Eaton	Former site of a Potawatomi village, which once had garden beds and a burial ground.
14	Kiel Mill	Kiel Mill	February 4, 2022 (#100007129)	11 East Fremont St. 43°54′45″N 88°01′38″W	Kiel	German immigrant William Meyer built this first flouring mill in Kiel beside the Sheboygan River in 1883, toward the end of Wisconsin's wheat-growing heyday. Converted to steam power around 1894. The Klemmes bought it in 1919 and later converted to electric power.
15	Charles and Herriette Klingholz House	Charles and Herriette Klingholz House	August 6, 2013 (#13000587)	224 Mill Rd. 44°05′36″N 87°42′21″W	Manitowoc Rapids	Dignified Italianate farmhouse built in 1868. Klingholz operated a flouring mill on the Manitowoc River and served as a civic leader.
16	LaSalle Shipwreck (schooner)		May 1, 2017 (#100000949)	1.27 mi. S. of Rawley Pt. Lighthouse in L. Michigan; 44°11′31″N 87°30′35″W	Two Rivers	139-foot three-masted schooner built in 1874 by Parsons & Humble of Tonawanda, built to hold maximum grain yet fit through the locks of the Welland Canal. On October 25, 1875, heading with a load of wheat from Chicago for Buffalo, she was damaged in a gale, caught in quicksand, and wrecked.
17	Lincoln Boulevard Historic District	Lincoln Boulevard Historic District	March 29, 2019 (#100003576)	Generally bounded by both sides of Lincoln Blvd. between Cleveland Ave. & Oak St. 44°06′19″N 87°39′23″W	Manitowoc	Neighborhood of 84 contributing homes, including the 1893 Queen Anne Meany house, the 1915 Prairie School Kulnick house, the 1920 Craftsman Kerscher house, the 1920 American Foursquare Galloway house, the 1922 Miller bungalow, the 1930 French Provincial Dick house, the 1930 Tudor Revival Grall house, the 1934 Mediterranean Revival Strathearn house, and the 1939 Colonial Revival Dr. Schneck house.
18	Lookout (schooner) Shipwreck	Lookout (schooner) Shipwreck	June 5, 2017 (#100001051)	Lake Michigan, 4.35 miles (7.00 km) northeast of Two Rivers; 44°11′42″N 87°30′36″W	Two Rivers	127-foot wooden schooner built in 1855 by George Hardison of Buffalo, NY. Sailed the Great Lakes for many years, with cargoes including grain, coal and lumber. Grounded off Rawley Point April 29, 1897, heading from Chicago to Masonville, Michigan in a northeast gale.
19	Loreto Shrine Chapel	Loreto Shrine Chapel	June 7, 1982 (#82000679)	Off WI A 43°59′58″N 87°55′44″W	St. Nazianz	Pink stucco chapel built in 1870 to house a statue of Mary brought by immigrants from Baden, Germany.
20	Luling School		September 26, 2025 (#100012331)	1010 Huron Street; 44°06′08″N 87°39′40″W	Manitowoc	Public graded elementary school, with its original block designed by T.D. Allen in Italian Renaissance Revival style and built in 1892. Classroom wings were added in 1899 and 1907, and a gymnasium in 1938. Construction of the gymnasium was supported with PWA funding, and the arched laminate beams supporting the gym's roof are the first use of that technology in the city.
21	Lutze Housebarn	Lutze Housebarn	June 7, 1984 (#84003702)	13634 S. Union Rd. 43°55′59″N 87°46′58″W	Newton	"Long" house built by German immigrants in 1850, with the family's home at one end and cattle housing at the other. Framed from hand-hewn timbers in the fachwerk style, it is believed to be one of only three such structures left in the U.S.
22	Major Anderson (barkentine) Shipwreck		October 15, 2014 (#14000866)	Lake Michigan near mouth of Molash Cr. 44°10′57″N 87°30′40″W	Two Rivers	154-foot wooden barkentine schooner built in 1861 in Cleveland. Sank in a gale in 1871 while carrying a load of coal from Erie to Chicago.
23	Manitowoc County Courthouse	Manitowoc County Courthouse	April 16, 1981 (#81000047)	8th and Washington Sts. 44°05′17″N 87°39′29″W	Manitowoc	3-story Neoclassical courthouse with Beaux-Arts details, built in 1906. It was designed by Christ H. Tegen, a local architect who immigrated from Germany.
24	Mirro Aluminum Company Plant No. 3	Mirro Aluminum Company Plant No. 3	July 26, 2016 (#16000475)	2402 Franklin St. 44°05′27″N 87°40′44″W	Manitowoc	5-story factory built by Aluminum Goods Manufacturing Company in 1929. Mirro built its Mirro-Craft aluminum pleasure boat here from 1958 to 1962. In 2015, the plant was converted to loft apartments for artists.
25	National Tinsel and Toy Manufacturing Company Building	National Tinsel and Toy Manufacturing Company Building	July 26, 2023 (#100009196)	1133 South 16th St. 44°05′09″N 87°40′08″W	Manitowoc	William Protz's factory that made Christmas tinsel, with its first section designed by Earl Miller and built in 1918, and additions in 1919, 1926, and 1927 designed by William Raeuber.
26	Pathfinder (schooner) Shipwreck	Pathfinder (schooner) Shipwreck	October 5, 2015 (#15000712)	2.6 mi. N. of Rawley Point Light Station; 44°14′44″N 87°30′41″W	Two Creeks	190-foot three-masted wooden schooner with an unusual keelson, built in Detroit in 1869. In November of 1886, carrying a load of iron ore from Marquette, a squall drove her ashore, where she now sits under 12 to 15 feet of water in quicksand, largely intact.
27	Rawley Point Light Station	Rawley Point Light Station	July 19, 1984 (#84003706)	Point Beach State Forest; 44°12′37″N 87°30′31″W	Two Rivers	Victorian lightkeeper's house built in 1873, with a 111-foot skeletal light-tower built in 1894. Tallest lighthouse on the Great Lakes.
28	Rock Mill	Rock Mill	June 21, 1982 (#82000680)	Off U.S. 141 (now County R); 44°17′58″N 87°46′33″W	Maribel	2 1/2-story wooden mill built on Devil's River in 1847 as a sawmill by Pliny Pierce and Mr. Bruce. Converted to a gristmill in the 1850s, much of the original grinding machinery is still in place.
29	ROUSE SIMMONS (Shipwreck)	ROUSE SIMMONS (Shipwreck)	March 21, 2007 (#07000197)	6 mi (9.7 km). off Point Beach; 44°16′45″N 87°24′52″W	Lake Michigan	The Christmas Tree Ship. 124-foot 3-masted double-centerboard lumber schooner built in 1868. Later in her career she was used to haul Christmas trees from Thompson, Michigan to Chicago, and sank in November 1912, with all hands lost.
30	S.C. Baldwin Shipwreck (barge)	S.C. Baldwin Shipwreck (barge)	August 22, 2016 (#16000565)	2.3 miles (3.7 km) SSE of Rawley Point Light in Lake Michigan; 44°11′35″N 87°27′12″W	Two Rivers	160-foot wooden steam barge built in 1871 to carry iron ore from Escanaba to Milwaukee and Chicago. Later carried lumber and coal until it sank in Green Bay in 1903. Raised and repurposed for hauling limestone out of Sturgeon Bay until she sank in August of 1908, losing one man.
31	St. Gregory's Church	St. Gregory's Church	June 7, 1982 (#82000681)	212 Church St. 44°00′19″N 87°55′35″W	St. Nazianz	"Country Church Gothic" church with 148-foot steeple, designed by Rev. Ambrose Oschwald and built in 1864, named for Gregory of Nazianzus. Oschwald founded St. Nazianz as a communal religious community for Catholic immigrants from Baden, Germany.
32	Saint Luke's Church Complex	Saint Luke's Church Complex	February 9, 2001 (#01000107)	1800-1816 Jefferson St. 44°09′02″N 87°34′03″W	Two Rivers	Tall Gothic Revival Catholic church built in 1891, a 2 1/2-story Queen Anne-styled rectory designed by Christ Tegen and built in 1895, and a 3-story Classical Revival influenced elementary school.
33	St. Mary's Convent	St. Mary's Convent	April 5, 2001 (#82005120)	300 S. Second Ave. 44°00′15″N 87°55′26″W	St. Nazianz	The Greek Revival-styled stucco-clad building was constructed as an orphanage and hospital in 1866-67 by Father Oschwald's utopian community, then converted to a convent in 1896 when the Sisters of the Divine Savior took over. Now Maria Haus.
34	Bernard and Fern Schwartz House	Bernard and Fern Schwartz House	March 28, 2019 (#100003551)	3425 Adams St. 44°10′00″N 87°34′36″W	Two Rivers	2-story Usonian home designed by Frank Lloyd Wright and built in 1939, with views of the East Twin River.
35	Sexton's House	Sexton's House	February 23, 2001 (#01000173)	736 Revere Dr. 44°06′04″N 87°40′15″W	Manitowoc	Gable-roofed brick Italianate home with porte cochere, built in 1878 at the southeast end of Evergreen Cemetery to house its keeper, the sexton.
36	Tubal Cain (barque) Shipwreck		December 4, 2017 (#100001873)	1.33 miles (2.14 km) NE of Two Rivers harbor entrance in L. Michigan; 44°09′22″N 87°32′32″W	Two Rivers vicinity	137-foot wooden canal barque built in 1866 by J.M. Jones of Detroit, built to carry grain between Chicago and New York via the Welland Canal. On Nov 26, 1867, heading out from Milwaukee carrying 18,000 bushels of wheat, she ran ashore just off Two Rivers, and settled into quicksand.
37	Two Rivers Post Office	Two Rivers Post Office	October 24, 2000 (#00001246)	1516 Eighteenth St. 44°09′00″N 87°34′08″W	Two Rivers	Georgian Revival-styled post office, designed by Perce Schley of Milwaukee and built in 1933 with help from the New Deal Public Works Administration.
38	USS COBIA (submarine)	USS COBIA (submarine)	January 14, 1986 (#86000087)	809 S. Eighth St. 44°05′31″N 87°39′29″W	Manitowoc	312-foot Gato-class "thin-skinned" sub, built in 1943, which helped blockade Japan during World War II. Built by the Electric Boat Company of Groton, CT, but similar to subs built by nearby Manitowoc Shipbuilding.
39	Joseph Vilas, Jr. House	Joseph Vilas, Jr. House	April 29, 1977 (#77000035)	610-616 N. 8th St. 44°05′57″N 87°39′29″W	Manitowoc	2.5-story home designed by Ferry & Clas in Shingle style and built in 1891. In Manitowoc Vilas helped run a general store and shipped grain, served as village president and state senator, and promoted a railroad. He moved west for mining, then returned in 1890 and built this house. Reinhardt Rahr was a local brewer who lived here starting in 1910. Now the Rahr-West Art Museum.
40	Ruth St. John and John Dunham West House and Gardens	Ruth St. John and John Dunham West House and Gardens	February 17, 2023 (#100008630)	915 Memorial Dr. 44°06′52″N 87°38′07″W	Manitowoc	Streamline Moderne-style house built in 1934, surrounded by extensive gardens. Ruth was a garden expert who started local garden clubs and travelled through the Midwest lecturing and demonstrating.

== See also ==
- List of National Historic Landmarks in Wisconsin
- National Register of Historic Places listings in Wisconsin
- Listings in neighboring counties: Brown, Calumet, Kewaunee, Sheboygan
