= Sisseton (disambiguation) =

Sisseton typically refers to Sisseton, South Dakota.

Other uses include:

- Sisseton people, a group of Dakota people, a plains tribe
- Sisseton-Wahpeton Oyate, a federally recognized tribe of Santee Dakota in South Dakota
- Sisseton Wahpeton College, a tribal college in South Dakota
- Sisseton Lake, in Minnesota
