= Oneida County Courthouse =

Oneida County Courthouse may refer to:

- Oneida County Courthouse (Idaho), Malad, Idaho
- Oneida County Courthouse (Wisconsin), Rhinelander, Wisconsin
