= Franz E. Rohrbeck =

American painter

Franz Edward Rohrbeck (1852–1919), often referred to as Franz E. Rohrbeck, was an American artist, of Milwaukee, known for his murals in courthouses and other government buildings.

He graduated from the Berlin Art Academy and emigrated from Germany to the United States in 1885.

He became a muralist at some point, having "worked as a panoramic painter in San Francisco" and having done some painting for the 1893 World Columbian Exposition.

He painted murals in Wisconsin, Minnesota, Iowa, and Michigan. He is probably most known for his large mural, "The Spirit and Strength of Wisconsin," at the Wisconsin State Capitol.

Works include:

- Two 8 feet (2.4 m) by 10 feet (3.0 m) mural paintings in the second floor courtroom at Green County Courthouse
- Six murals at Martin County Courthouse (Fairmont, Minnesota) (designed by Charles E. Bell, built 1906–07)
- Four murals on four spandrels under the dome of Grant County Courthouse (Lancaster, Wisconsin) (1905)
- Mural "The Spirit and Strength of Wisconsin" in the Wisconsin State Capitol, in Madison, Wisconsin
- Mural(s) at Brown County Courthouse (designed by Charles E. Bell) in Green Bay, Wisconsin
- Mural(s) at Manitowoc County Courthouse (designed by German-born Christ H. Tegen, built in 1906) in Manitowoc, Wisconsin

In at least two cases, it was architect Charles E. Bell who designed the county courthouse. Bell was a prolific architect of courthouses.
