= Manitowoc County Courthouse =

- U.S. National Register of Historic Places
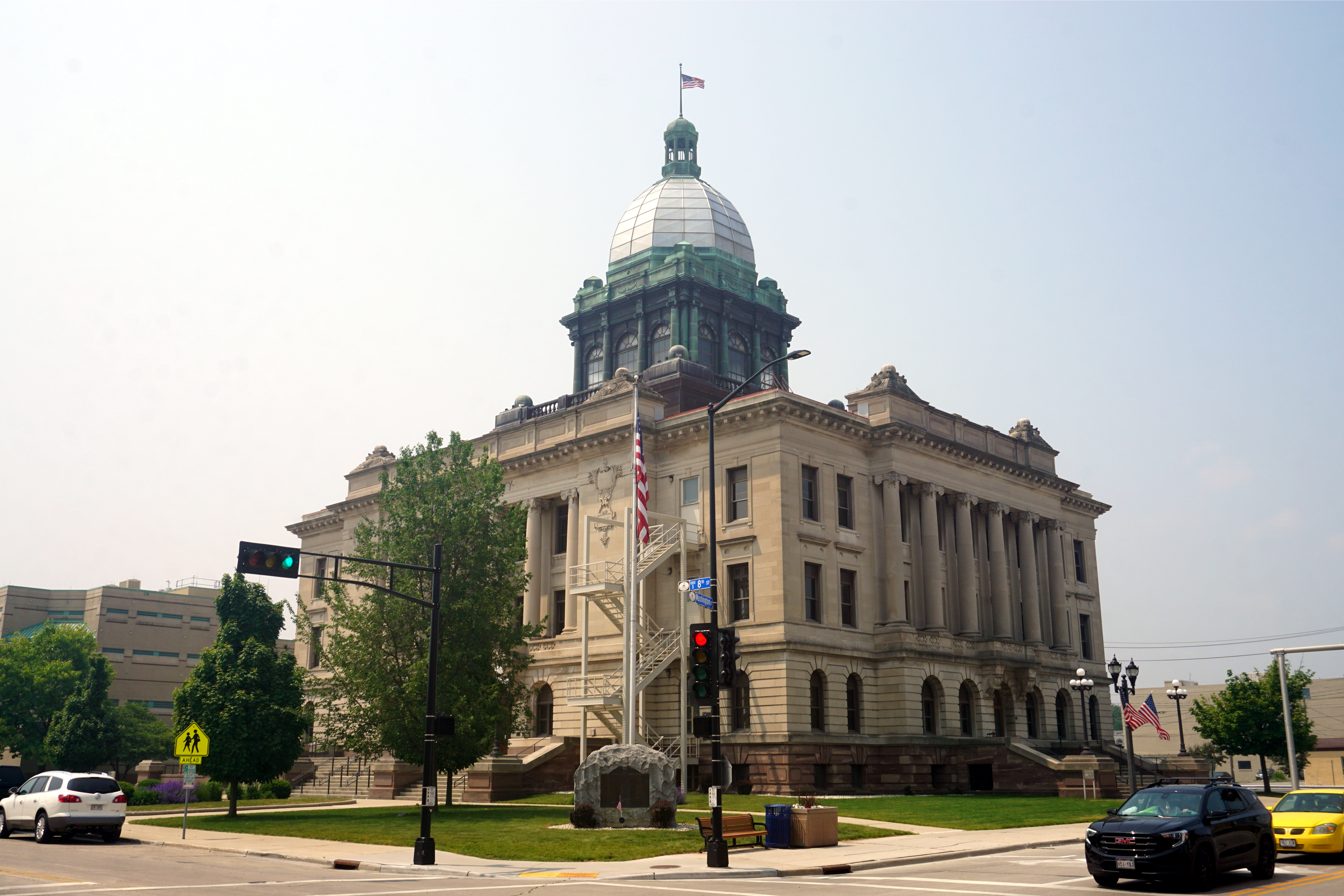
- Manitowoc County Courthouse

- Location within Wisconsin Location within the United States
- Interactive map showing the location for Manitowoc County Courthouse
- Location: 1010 South 8th Street; Manitowoc, Wisconsin
- Coordinates: 44°05′17″N 87°39′29″W
- Area: 1.5 acres (0.61 ha)
- Built: 1906
- Architect: Christ H. Tegen/George Rickman & Sons Co.
- Architectural style: Beaux-Arts
- NRHP reference No.: 81000047
- Added to NRHP: April 16, 1981

The Manitowoc County Courthouse is a three-story domed courthouse located in Manitowoc, Wisconsin. It houses the circuit court and government offices of Manitowoc County, Wisconsin. The building was listed on the National Register of Historic Places in 1981 and on the State Register of Historic Places in 1989 for its significance as a local example of Beaux-Arts and Neoclassical architecture. The courthouse is located in the Eighth Street Historic District.

== History ==
The current building is the third courthouse to serve Manitowoc County. The first courthouse was a wooden structure built in Manitowoc Rapids, Wisconsin in 1839. It burnt down in 1852 when an inmate of the adjoining jail started a conflagration. After the fire, Manitowoc replaced Manitowoc Rapids as the county seat.

The second courthouse was a brick structure constructed in 1857 on the same site as the present courthouse. In 1905, the county decided to replace this courthouse to gain more space. The second courthouse was moved a block to the south, where it continued to house a variety of public functions until demolition in 1961 to make way for a new jail and sheriff's department.

The present courthouse was built in 1905–1907. German-born architect Christ H. Tegen of Manitowoc designed the structure, and the county contracted with George Rickman & Sons of Kalamazoo, Michigan to construct the building. The total cost was $238,000. Tegen would reuse several elements of the courthouse design when he planned the similar 1908 Oneida County Courthouse.

The dome of the courthouse was originally copper and glass, and was nearly identical to the domes of the Oneida County Courthouse and Grant County Courthouse. When a severe storm in May 1950 damaged the glass, the dome was rebuilt with stainless steel.

== Design ==
The courthouse is a three-story stone Beaux-Arts structure. The exterior walls are gray Indiana Limestone, with red sandstone foundations. The stone at the foundation level and first floor is horizontally rusticated, and the first floor doors and windows are arched. The north, east (front), and south facades feature Ionic columns spanning from the second to the third story. The building is capped with a substantial square drum that supports an octagonal copper and stainless steel dome.

The interior of the courthouse features a large square lobby rising from the first floor to the cupola. The lobby is ornamented with classical columns, marble wainscoting, and ornamental cast metal balustrades lining the staircases and balconies. The spandrels below the dome feature medallions painted by Franz E. Rohrbeck. There is a large canvas landscape painting by Rohrbeck on the second floor depicting the original 1839 county courthouse. Another canvas landscape painting by artist Franz Biberstein depicts a panoramic view of Manitowoc.

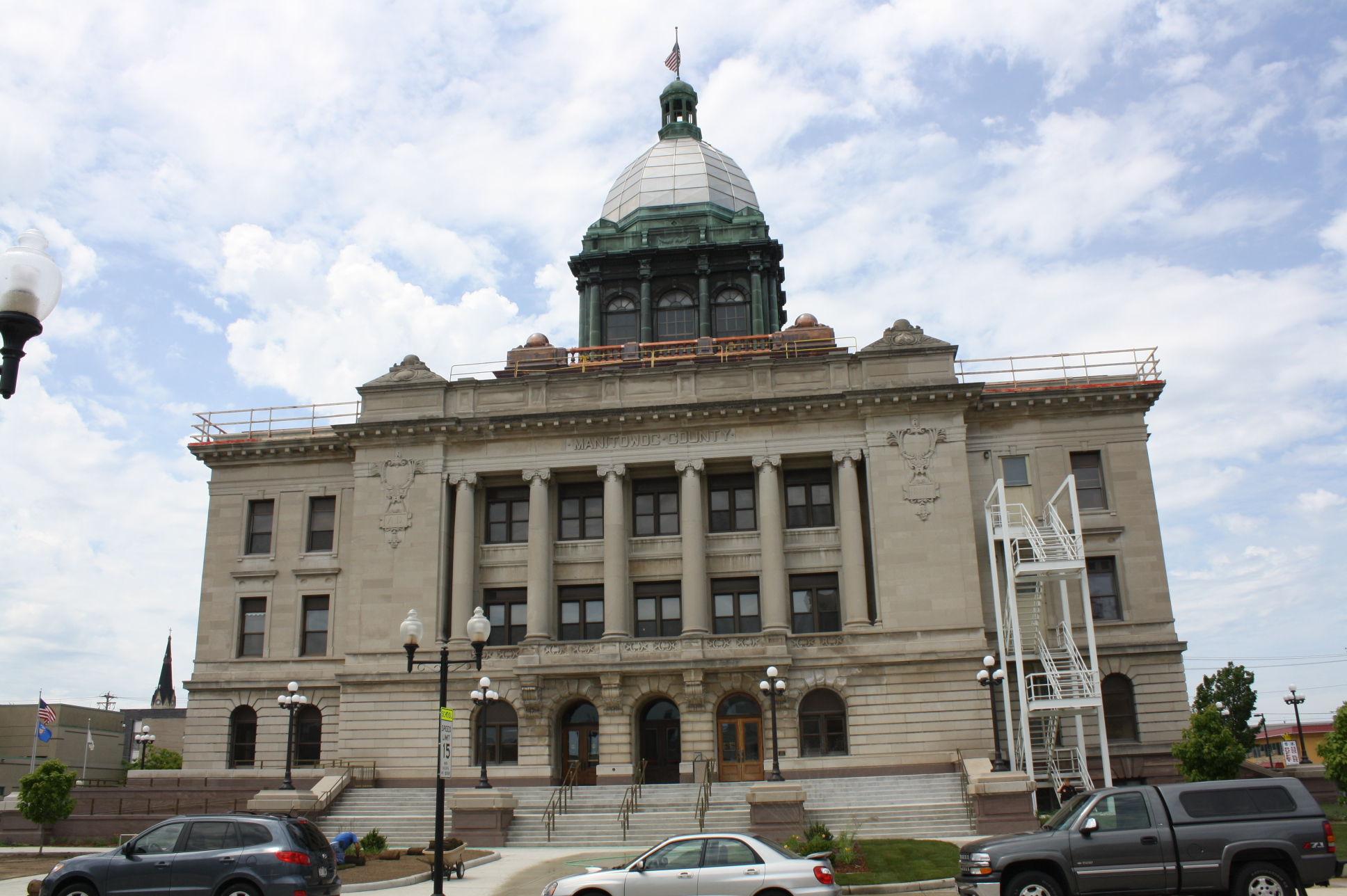
The east side of the Courthouse in 2010

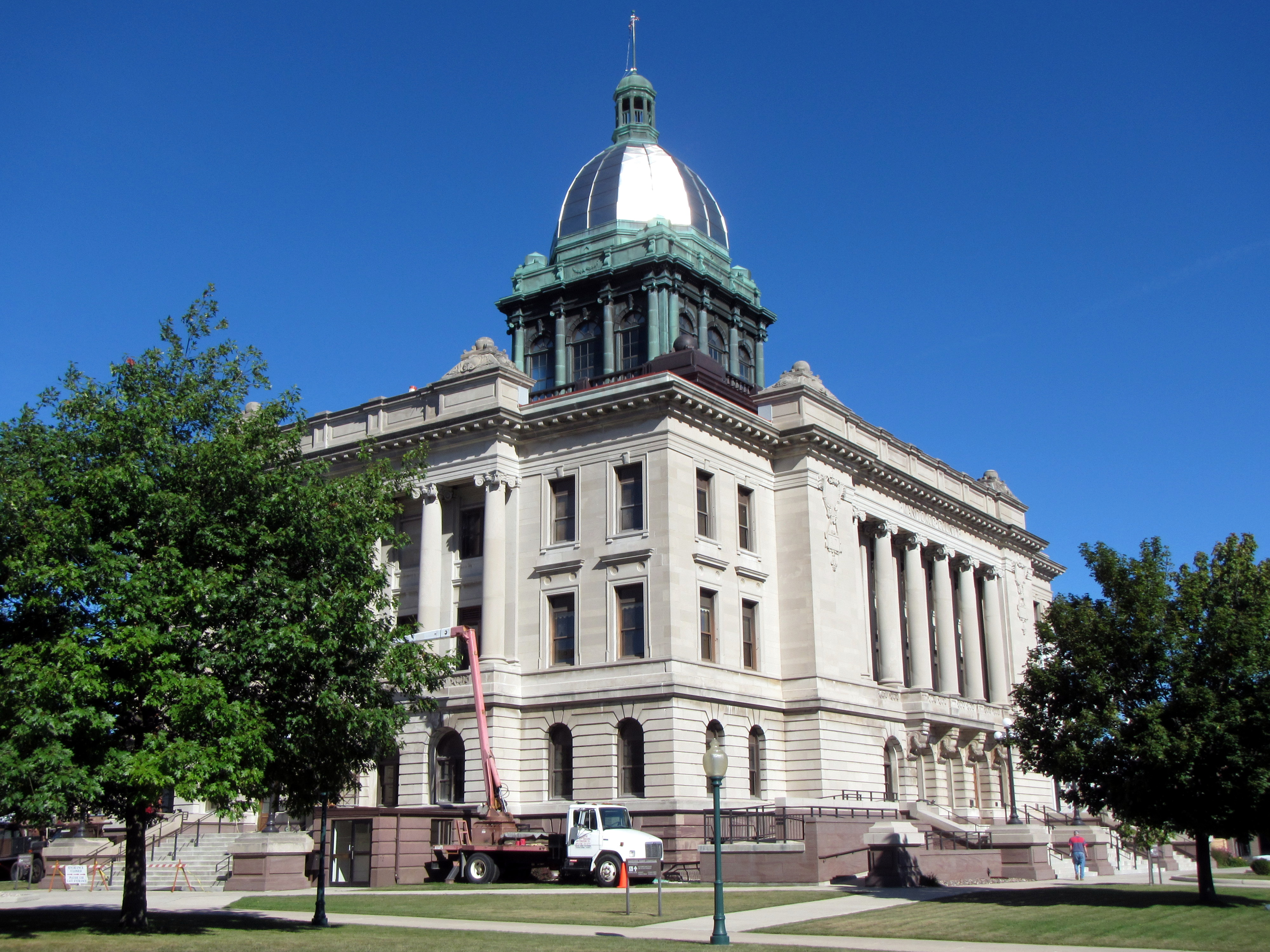
The southeast side of the Courthouse in 2013

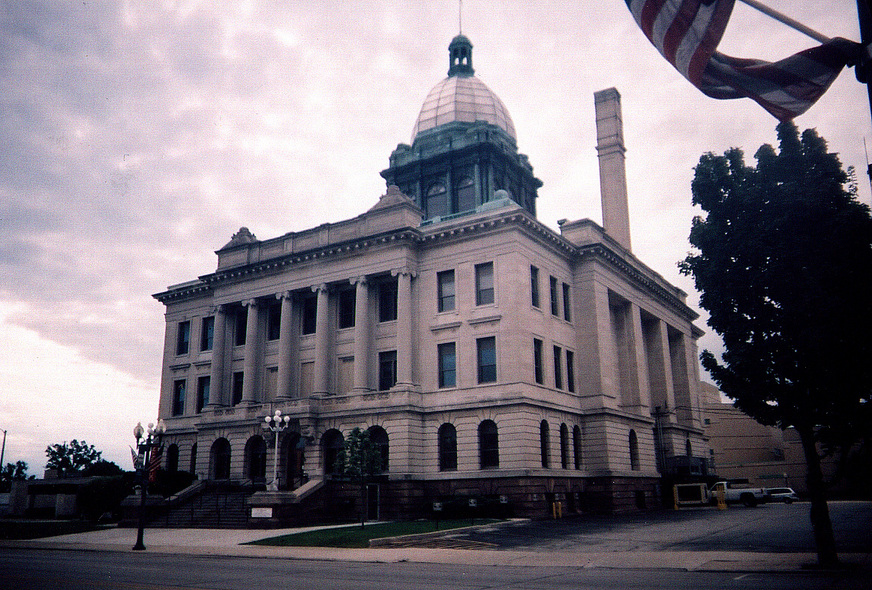
The northwest side of the Courthouse in 2006
