= Martin County Courthouse (Minnesota) =

- U.S. National Register of Historic Places
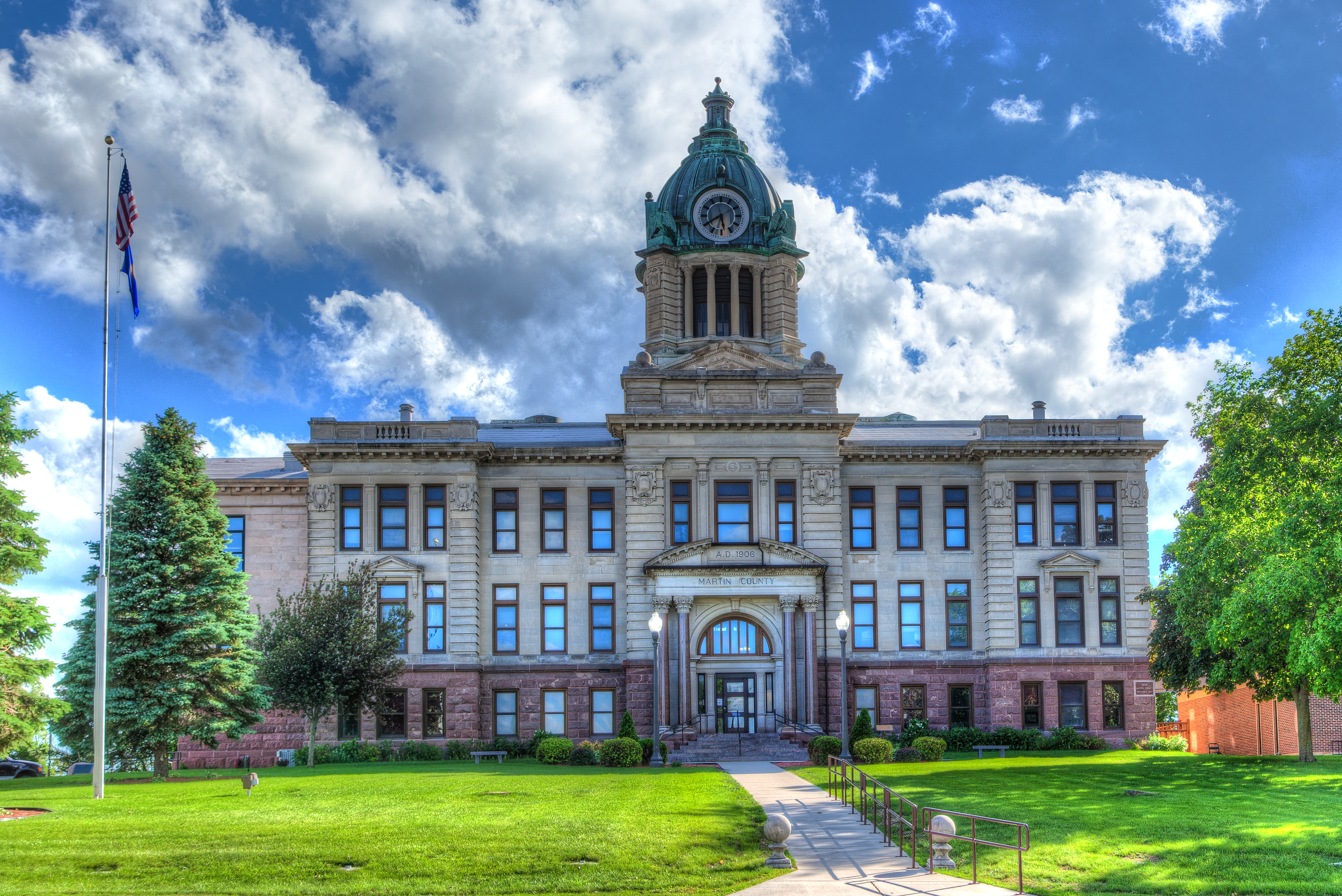

- Location within Minnesota Location within the United States
- Location: Fairmont, Minnesota
- Coordinates: 43°39′12.6″N 94°27′53.78″W
- Area: 1 acre (0.40 ha)
- Built: 1907
- Built by: J. B. Nelson
- Architect: Charles E. Bell
- Artist (murals): Franz E. Rohrbeck
- Architectural style: Beaux Arts
- NRHP reference No.: 77000755
- Added to NRHP: September 22, 1977

The Martin County Courthouse is the county courthouse for Martin County, Minnesota. The building is located at 201 Lake Avenue on the western side of the city of Fairmont, on a hill overlooking Lake Sisseton. It is a Beaux Arts building featuring a high copper dome with four clock faces. The first floor was made out of Michigan sandstone. The second and third stories are built of Bedford limestone. The arched entrance is flanked by polished double Corinthian order columns and topped by a pediment.

The building is connected to the brick and concrete Martin County Security Building by skyway on second level, and by tunnel below ground, at basement level. The security building provides space for police and detention, and was designed by 1972.

The building is 79 feet (24 m) by 116 feet (35 m) and rises 50 feet (15 m) to the top of the roof, then 58 feet (18 m) to the top of the dome.

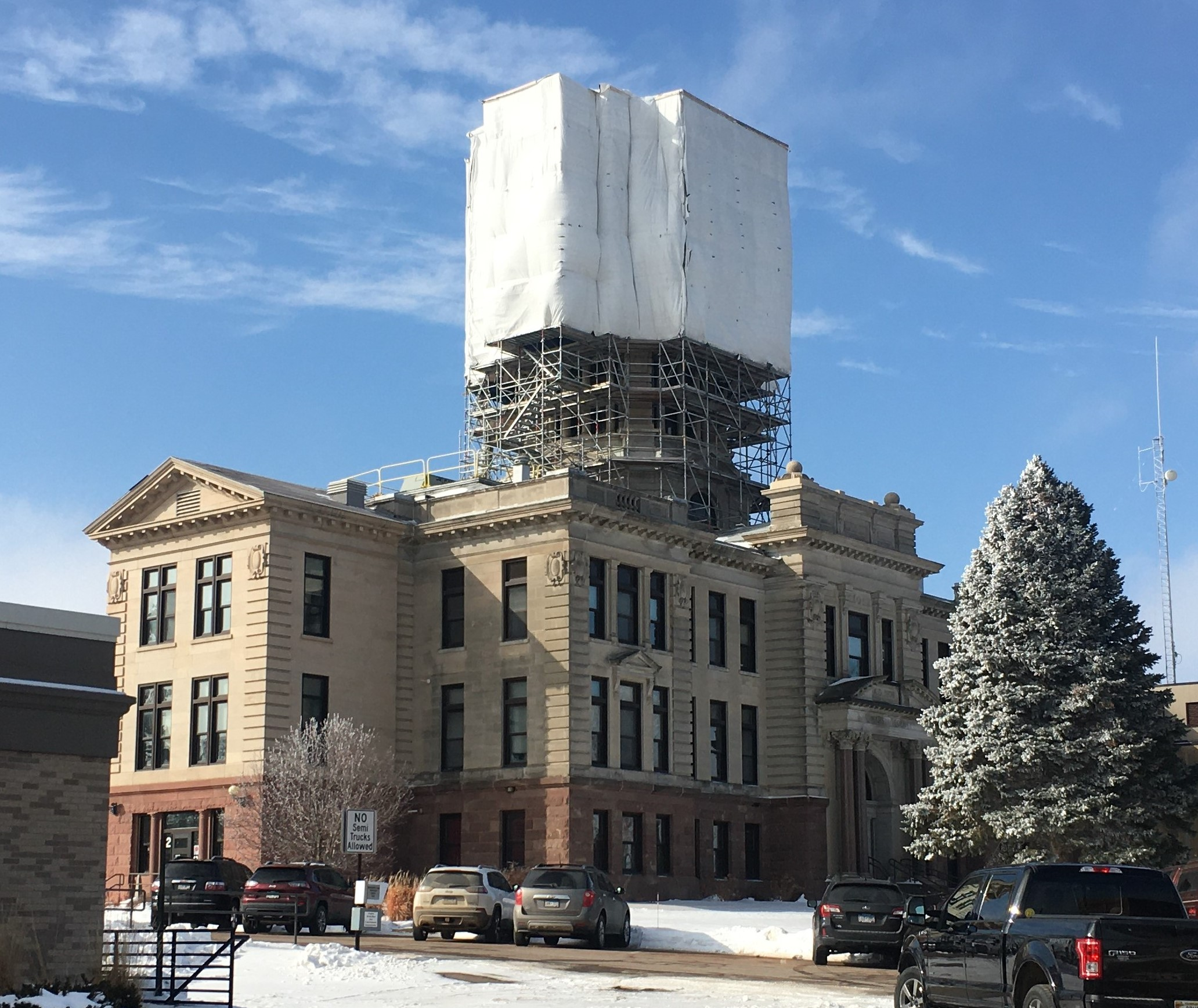
View of renovations being conducted at the courthouse in February 2021

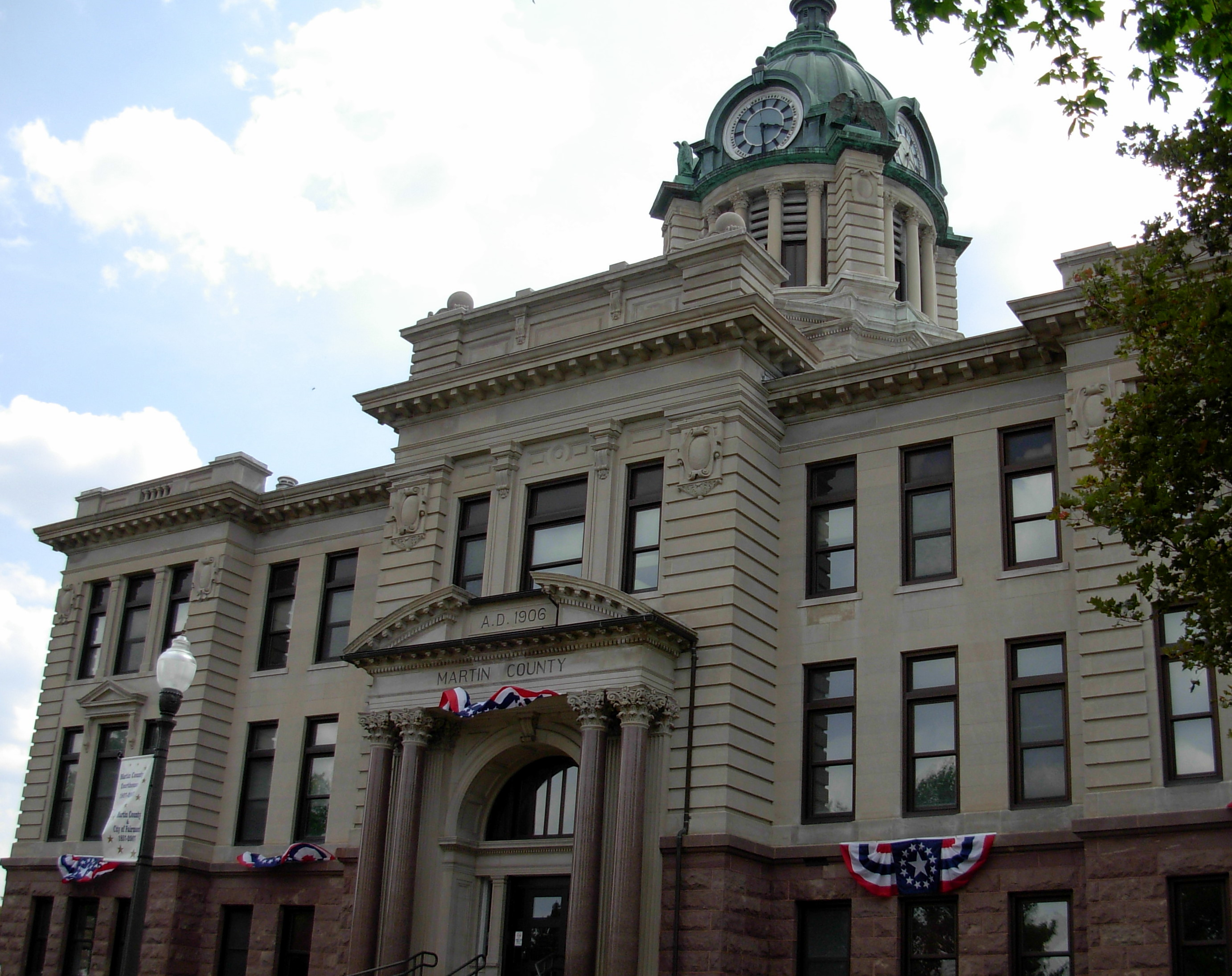
The courthouse as seen in 2007

== History ==
The building was designed by Charles E. Bell and built by J. B. Nelson for $125,000 during 1906-1907. Interior murals of figures representing Peace, War, Inspiration, Genius, Sentence, and The Execution were painted by Franz E. Rohrbeck of Milwaukee. Interior finishing includes marble countertops, metalwork, and stained glass. The original clock, seated at the base of the domed roof, was designed and manufactured by noted clockmaker Seth Thomas. It features four 7 foot tall clocks, one on each side of the tower.

Renovation of the building began in late 2020, with the aim of replacing the leaking copper roof, as well as restoring the clockworks inside of the tower.
