= Eighth Street Historic District =

Historic district in Wisconsin, United States

- U.S. National Register of Historic Places
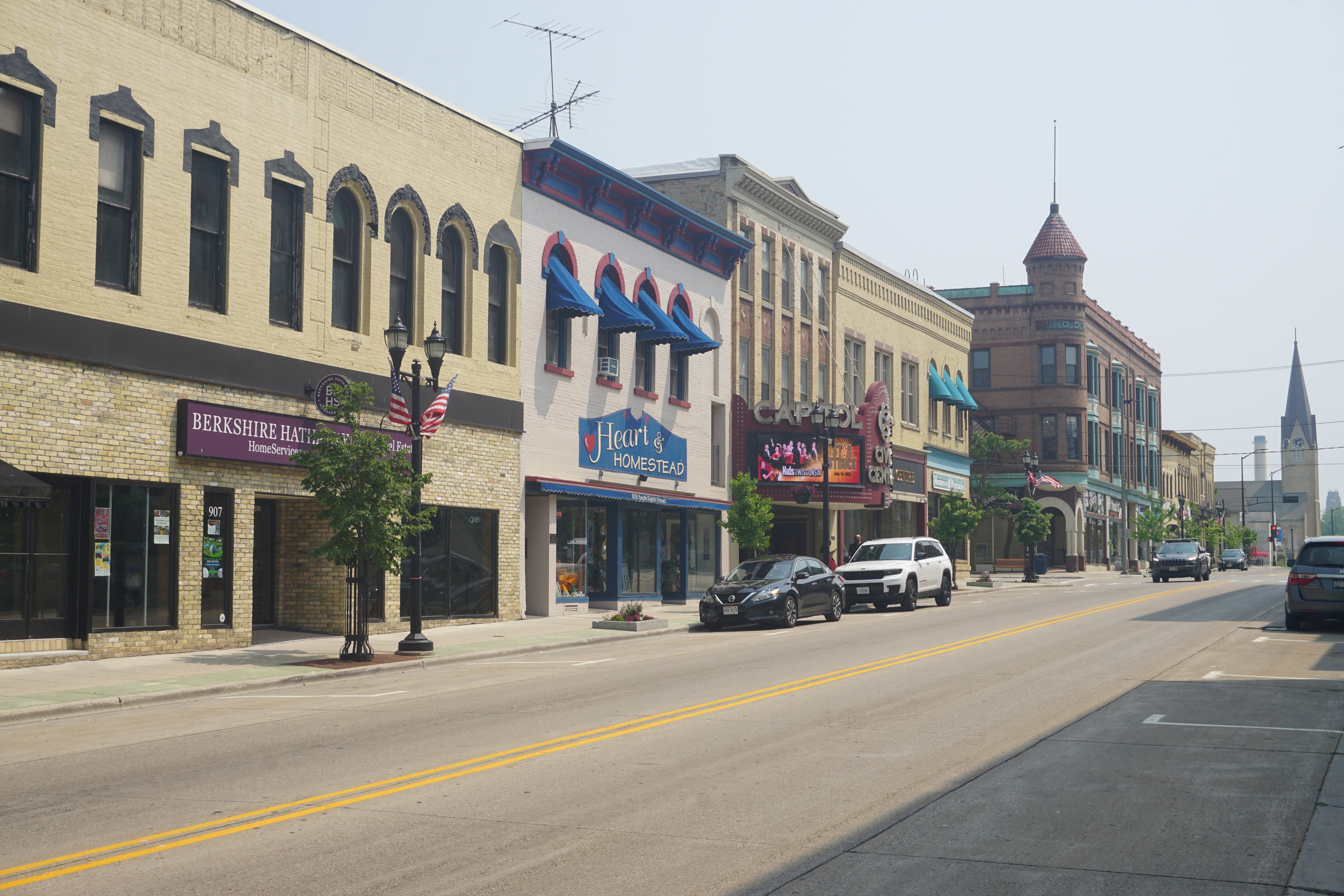
- A portion of the district.

- Location within Wisconsin Location within the United States
- Location: Roughly bounded by Buffalo St., Eighth and Seventh Sts., Hancock St., and Tenth, Ninth and Quay Sts., Manitowoc, Wisconsin
- Coordinates: 44°05′25″N 87°39′31″W
- Area: 32.3 acres (13.1 ha)
- NRHP reference No.: 88000215
- Added to NRHP: March 17, 1988

The Eighth Street Historic District is located in Manitowoc, Wisconsin, United States.

== History ==
The district is Manitowoc's old downtown, with many first stories remodeled, but many historic upper stories intact. Interesting structures include the 1853 Schultz house, the 1857 Italianate-styled Berner's Hardware Store, the 1865/1878 Fricke/Schreihart Brewery, the 1875/1880 Queen Anne Wernecke Bakery, the 3-story 1890 Queen Anne I.O.O.F. Hall, the 1895 High Victorian Italianate Jarchow Blacksmith shop, the 1901 Neoclassical German-American Bank, the 1901 Beaux Arts Schuette Brothers Department Store, the 1906 Christ H. Tegen-designed Beaux-Arts-styled Manitowoc County Courthouse and the 1927 Mediterranean-flavored Hotel Manitowoc.
