= Grant County Courthouse (Wisconsin) =

- U.S. National Register of Historic Places
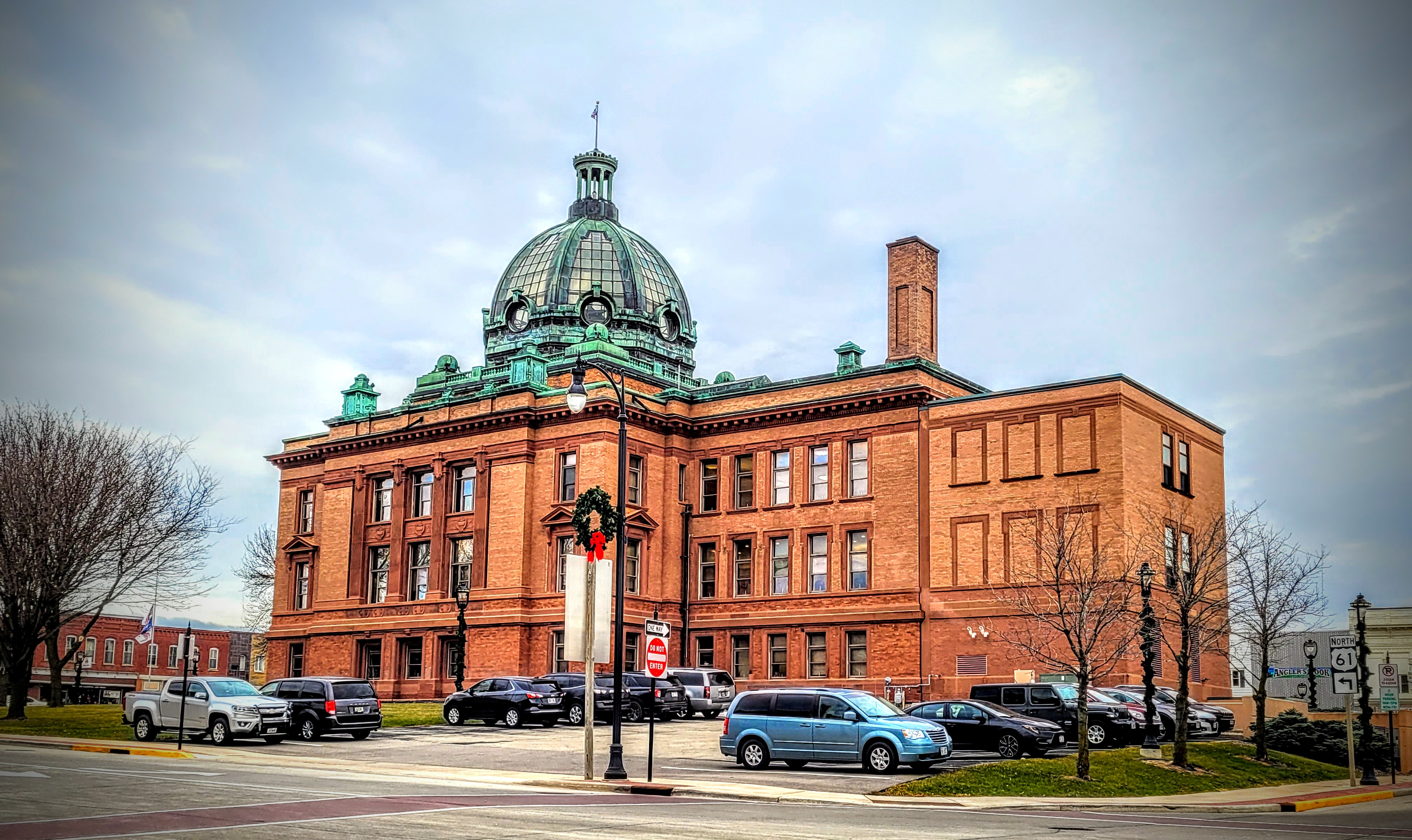

- Location within Wisconsin Location within the United States
- Interactive map showing the location of Grant County Courthouse
- Location: 126 W. Main Street, Lancaster, Wisconsin
- Coordinates: 42°50′51″N 90°42′36″W
- Area: 1.6 acres (0.65 ha)
- Built: 1902
- Architect: Armand D. Koch
- Artist (murals): Franz E. Rohrbeck
- Architectural style: Classical Revival
- NRHP reference No.: 78000096
- Added to NRHP: October 19, 1978

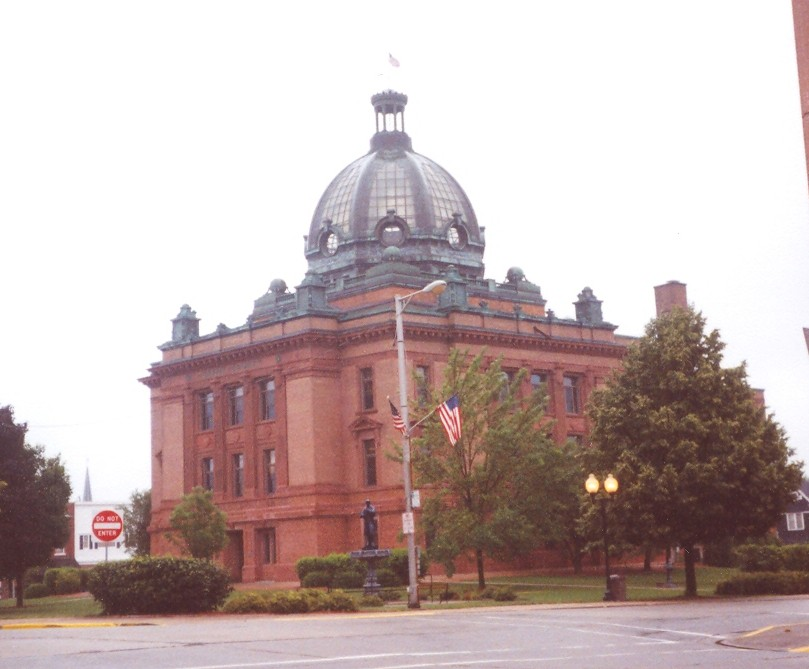
The courthouse in 2005

The Grant County Courthouse, built in 1902, is an historic glass-and-copper-domed county courthouse building located at 126 West Main Street in Lancaster, Wisconsin. Designed by Armand D. Koch in the Classical Revival style, it was built of red sandstone.

Murals decorating the four spandrels under the dome were done by Franz E. Rohrbeck. (Note: Franz Edward Rohrbeck of Milwaukee painted four murals under the dome of the Grant County Courthouse in Lancaster, Wisconsin, six murals at the Martin County Courthouse in Fairmont, Minnesota, and murals at the Green County Courthouse in Monroe, Wisconsin.) In a small room on the 1st floor (labeled "G.A.R.") can be found "the Stars and Bars." the flag of the Confederacy, captured from Archer's troops at the Battle of Gettysburg by the 7th Wisconsin.

On October 19, 1978, it was added to the National Register of Historic Places.
