= Oneida County Courthouse (Wisconsin) =

- U.S. National Register of Historic Places
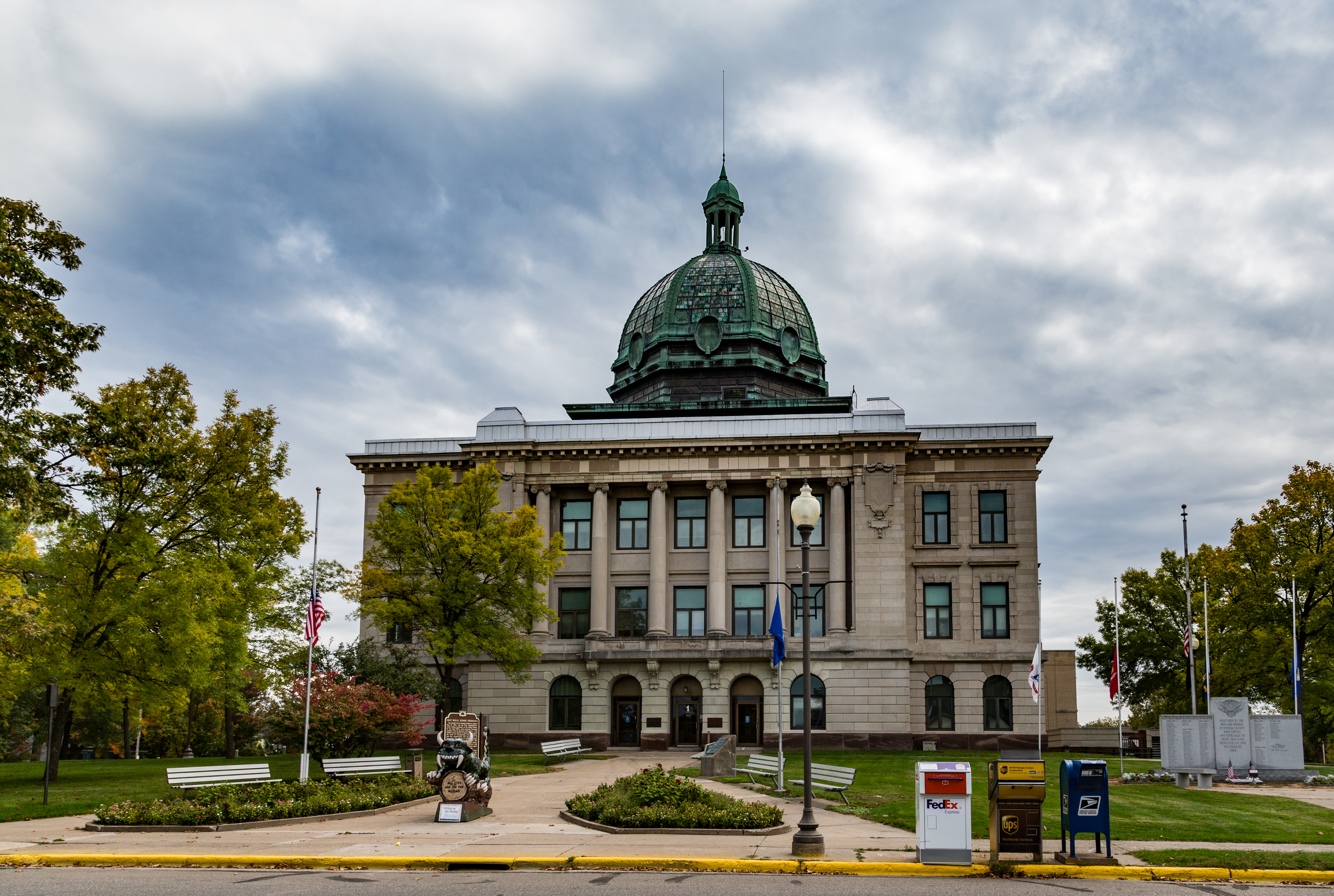
- Oneida County Courthouse

- Location within Wisconsin Location within the United States
- Interactive map showing the location for Oneida County Courthouse
- Location: S. Oneida Avenue, Rhinelander, Wisconsin
- Coordinates: 45°38′15″N 89°24′26″W
- Area: 3 acres (1.2 ha)
- Built: 1908-1910
- Architect: Christ H. Tegen
- Architectural style: Neoclassical
- NRHP reference No.: 81000052
- Added to NRHP: March 20, 1981

The Oneida County Courthouse is a three-story, copper-domed county courthouse located in Rhinelander, Wisconsin. It houses the circuit court and government offices of Oneida County, Wisconsin. The building was listed on the National Register of Historic Places in 1981 and on the State Register of Historic Places in 1989 for its significance as a local example of Neoclassical architecture.

== History ==
The courthouse was built in 1908 to a replace a timber-frame courthouse that had stood on the same site from 1887 to 1908. The 1908 courthouse was designed by German-born architect Christ H. Tegen of Manitowoc, who had designed the similar Manitowoc County Courthouse two years earlier. The rear of the building has been expanded several times over the century to provide additional space for county government.

== Design ==
The exterior of the courthouse consists of gray limestone ashlar walls, which are rusticated on the first story. The north, west, and south facades feature Ionic columns spanning from the second to the third story. The building is topped with an octagonal stained glass and copper dome. The dome is nearly identical to that of the Grant County, Wisconsin Courthouse, except that the latter uses clear glass, the stained glass in Rhinelander's courthouse was manufactured by the Schuler-Mueller Company of Chicago. It was damaged in a severe windstorm in 1964; the outer dome was quickly restored but the inner dome was not restored until 1987.

The courthouse interior includes a three-story light well beneath the stained-glass dome. The four spandrels of the dome are decorated with identical mosaics depicting eagles. There are three murals on the third floor. Two murals painted in 1919 by Franz Biberstein depict romanticized impressions of the area's early fur trading and lumber rafting history. The third, anonymous mural depicts the Hodag creature of local legend.

The grounds of the courthouse include a marble war memorial and various commemorative markers related to local history.

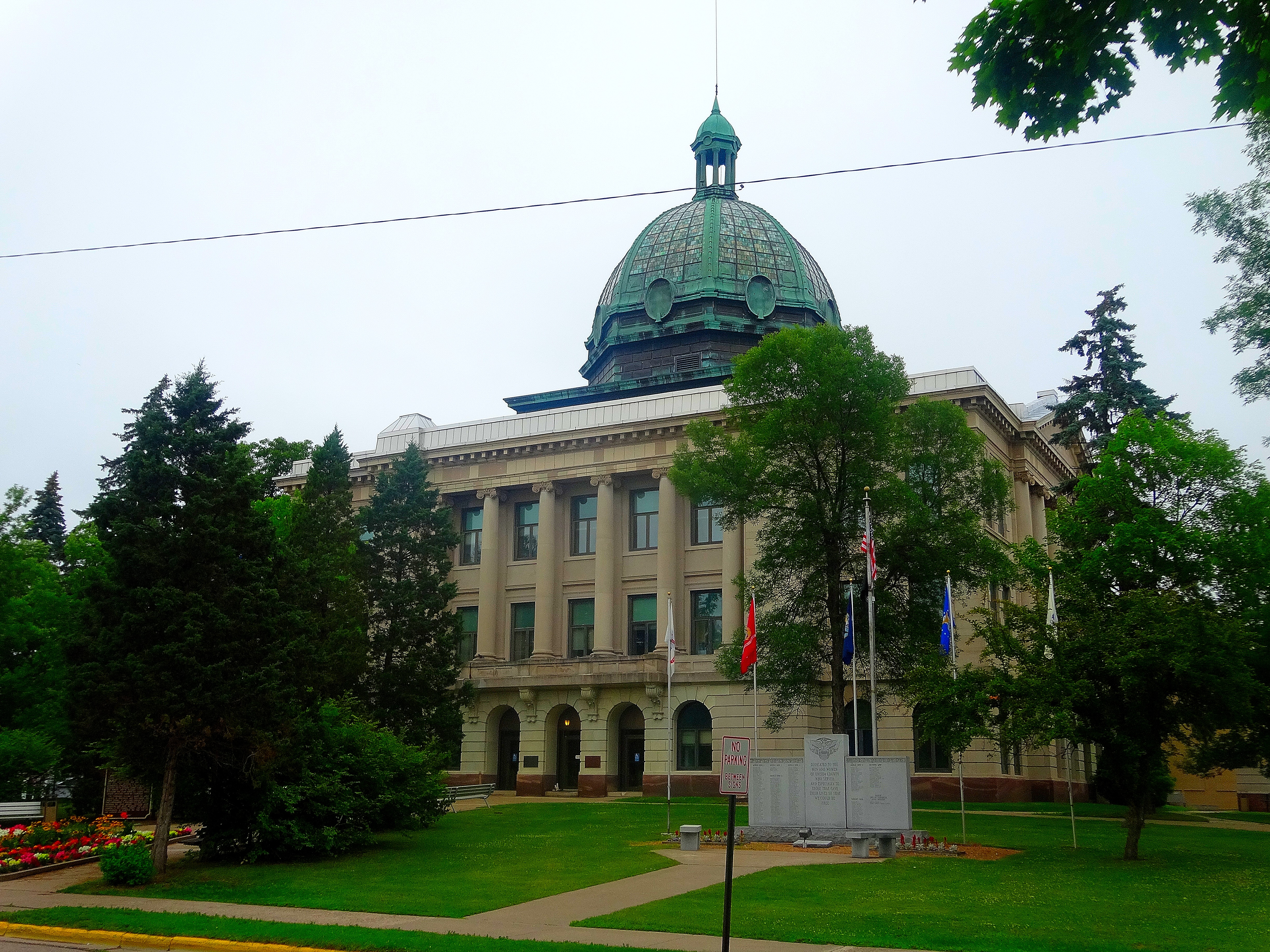
Southwest side of the courthouse in 2014, showing war memorial

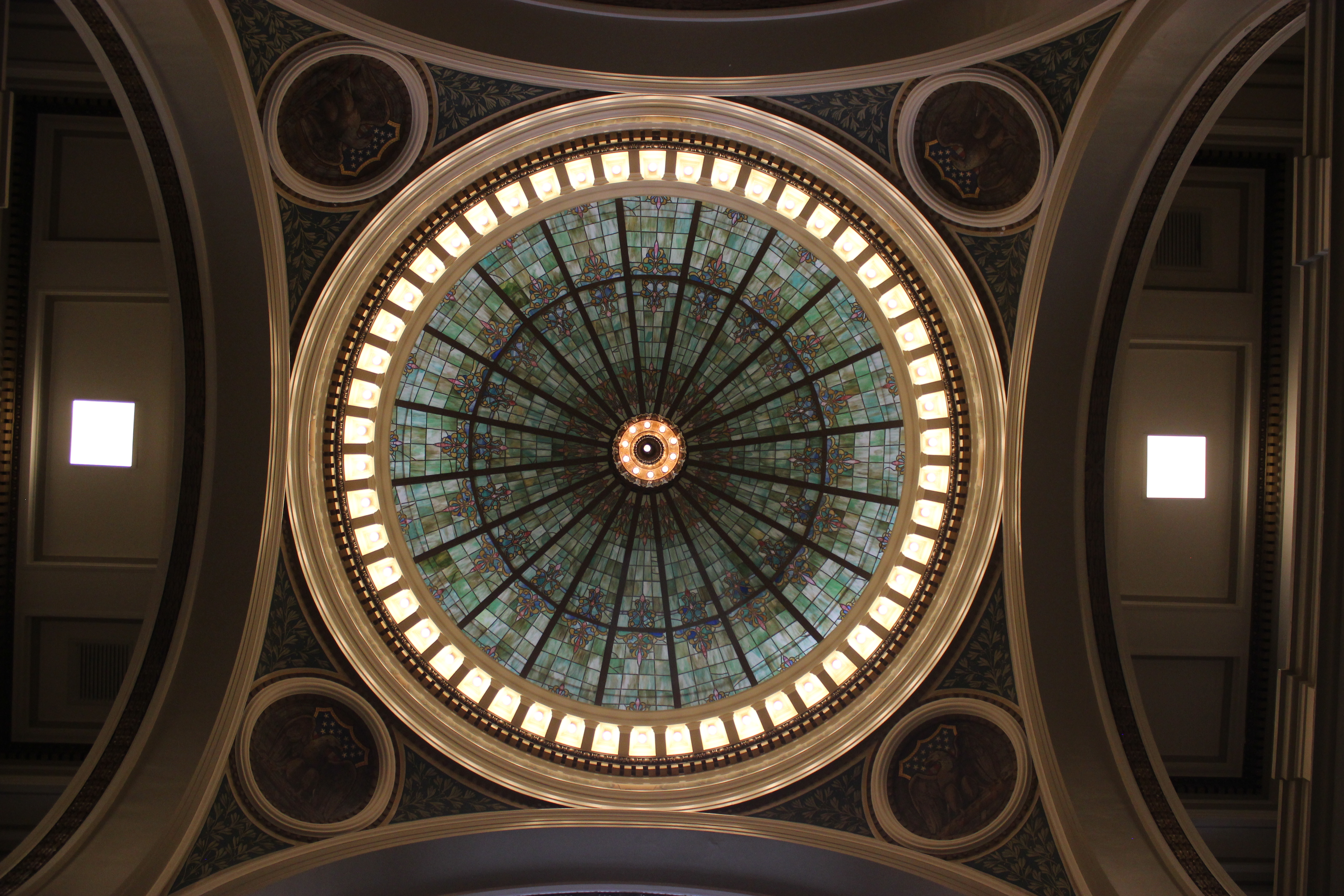
Interior of the courthouse's dome

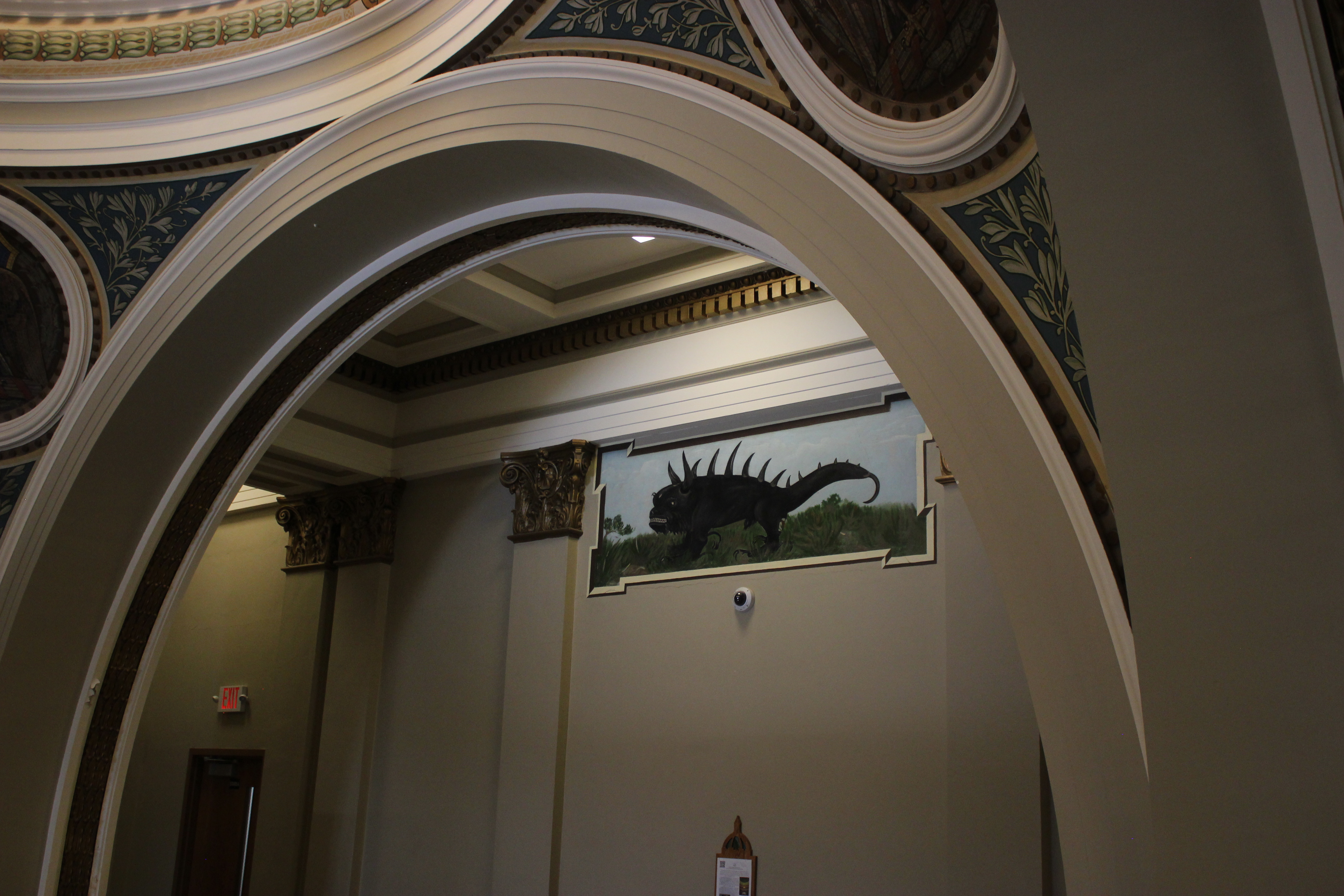
Hodag mural on the third floor
