= Home (shipwreck) =

Two-masted schooner which sank in Lake Michigan

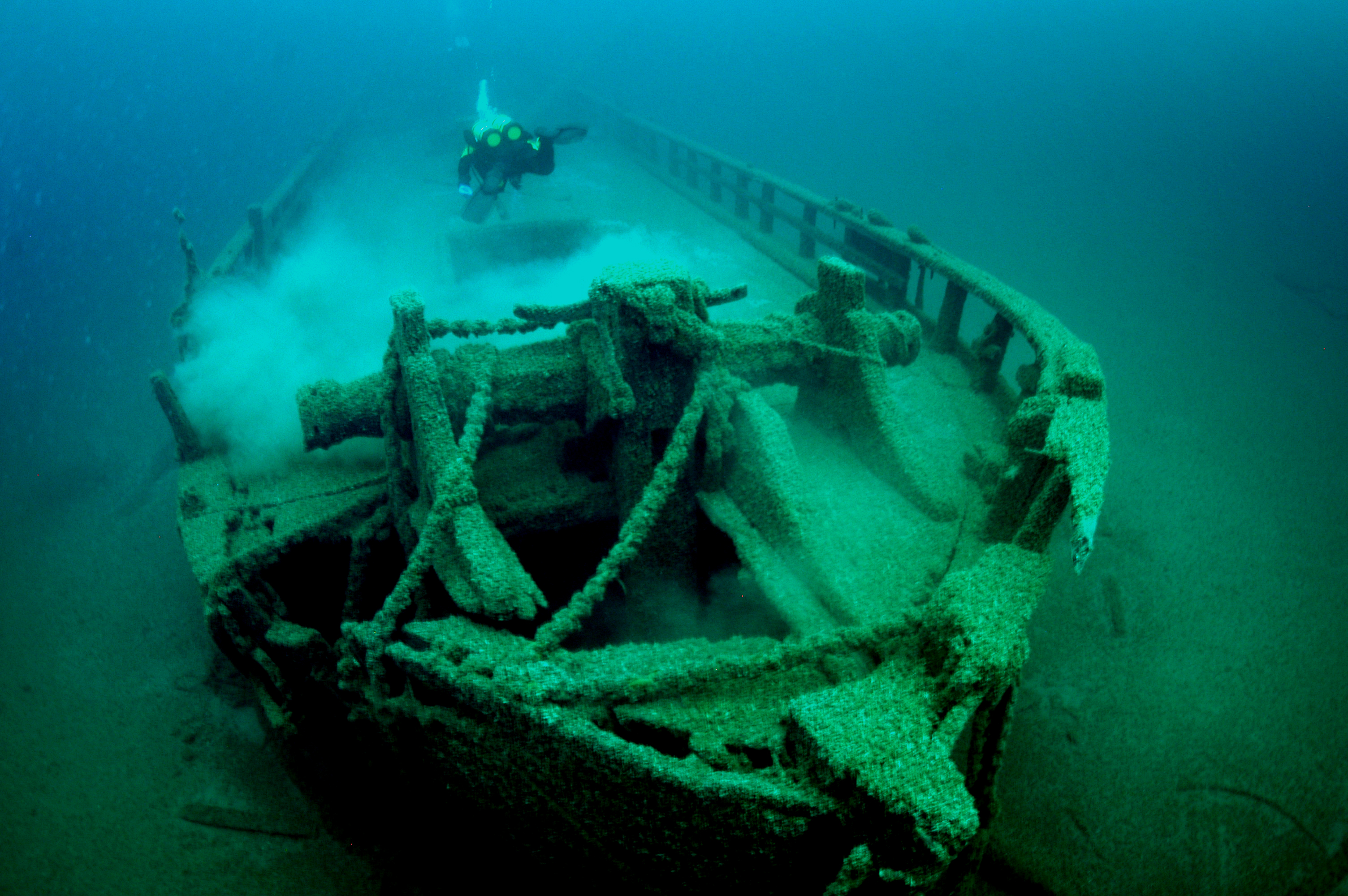

History

United States
- Name: Home
- Builder: Redfield, Black River, Ohio
- Completed: 1843
- Home port: Chicago, Illinois
- Fate: Sunk in collision October 17, 1858

General characteristics
- Type: Schooner
- Length: 84 feet 8 inches (25.8 m)
- Beam: 23 feet 8 inches (7.2 m)
- Depth: 7 feet 4 inches (2.2 m)
- Propulsion: Sails
- Sail plan: Two-masted schooner rig
- Home Shipwreck (Schooner)
- U.S. National Register of Historic Places
- Location within Wisconsin
- Location: Lake Michigan off Centerville, Manitowoc County, Wisconsin
- Coordinates: 43°56′50″N 87°33′17″W
- NRHP reference No.: 10001092
- Added to NRHP: December 28, 2010

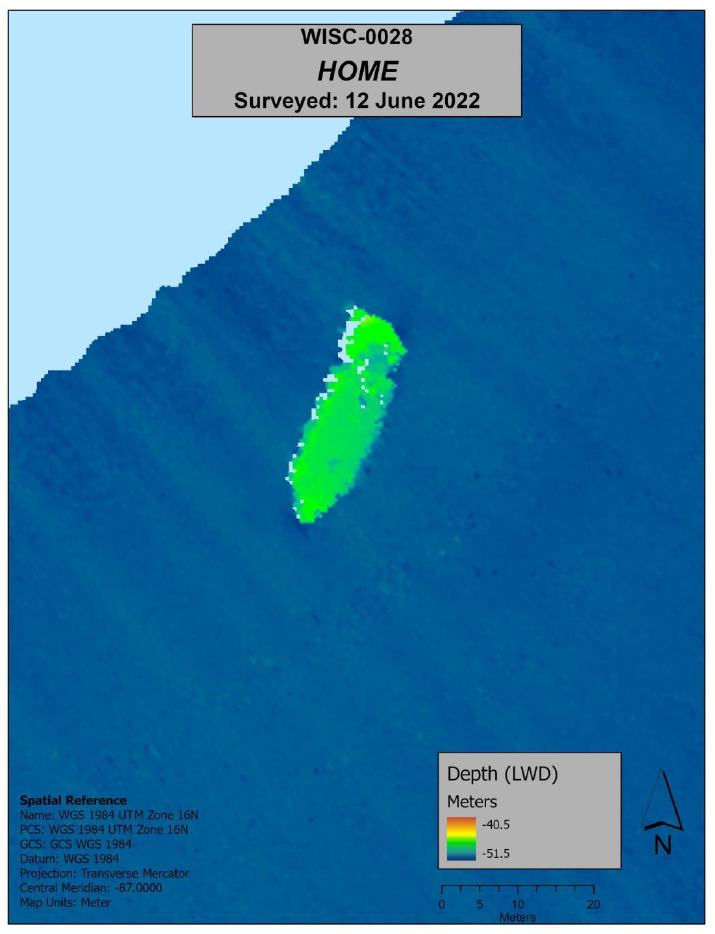
Sonar image of the wreck of Home, June 12, 2022.

Home was a two-masted schooner which sank in Lake Michigan off Centerville in Manitowoc County, Wisconsin, United States, in 1858. In 2010 the shipwreck site was added to the National Register of Historic Places.

== History ==
Home was built in 1843 by Redfield on the Black River in Ohio. The property of W. D. Winslow, Robert White, and Thomas Jones, of Chicago, Illinois, she was constructed to carry grain, lumber, and general merchandise between Lake Erie and the upper Great Lakes. Her captain, James Nugent, was an abolitionist who collaborated with the Underground Railroad, and many of the merchants who shipped goods on Home also opposed slavery, making it likely that Home contributed in some way to the Underground Railroad, although she was never caught with fugitive slaves aboard.

Home departed Manitowoc, Wisconsin, on October 16, 1858, bound for Chicago with a cargo of merchandise, wood, and cedar posts, and sank in Lake Michigan southeast of Manitowoc after a collision in dense fog and early-morning darkness with the schooner William Fiske at 4:00 a.m. on October 17, 1858. The collision stove in Home′s hull and toppled her masts. The undamaged William Fiske rescued her crew.

== Wreck ==
Several newspapers gave an incorrect location for the collision, and Home′s wreck was not discovered until April 1981. It lies in 165 to 170 feet (50 to 52 m) of water about 10 nautical miles (19 km; 12 mi) southeast of Manitowoc at 43°56.932′N 087°33.211′W. Added to the National Register of Historic Places on December 28, 2010, the shipwreck site was included within the boundaries of the Wisconsin Shipwreck Coast National Marine Sanctuary when it was created in 2021.

Home is the second-oldest shipwreck in Wisconsin's waters, preceded only by the 1833 schooner Gallinipper, which sank in 1851. The wreck is upright and mostly intact, although the stern cabin is missing and the starboard bow has damage from the collision with William Fiske. Home′s foremast also is missing from the wreck: It was pulled to the surface in commercial fishing nets, and is on display at the Rogers Street Fishing Village in Two Rivers, Wisconsin.
