= St. Mary's Convent =

- U.S. National Register of Historic Places
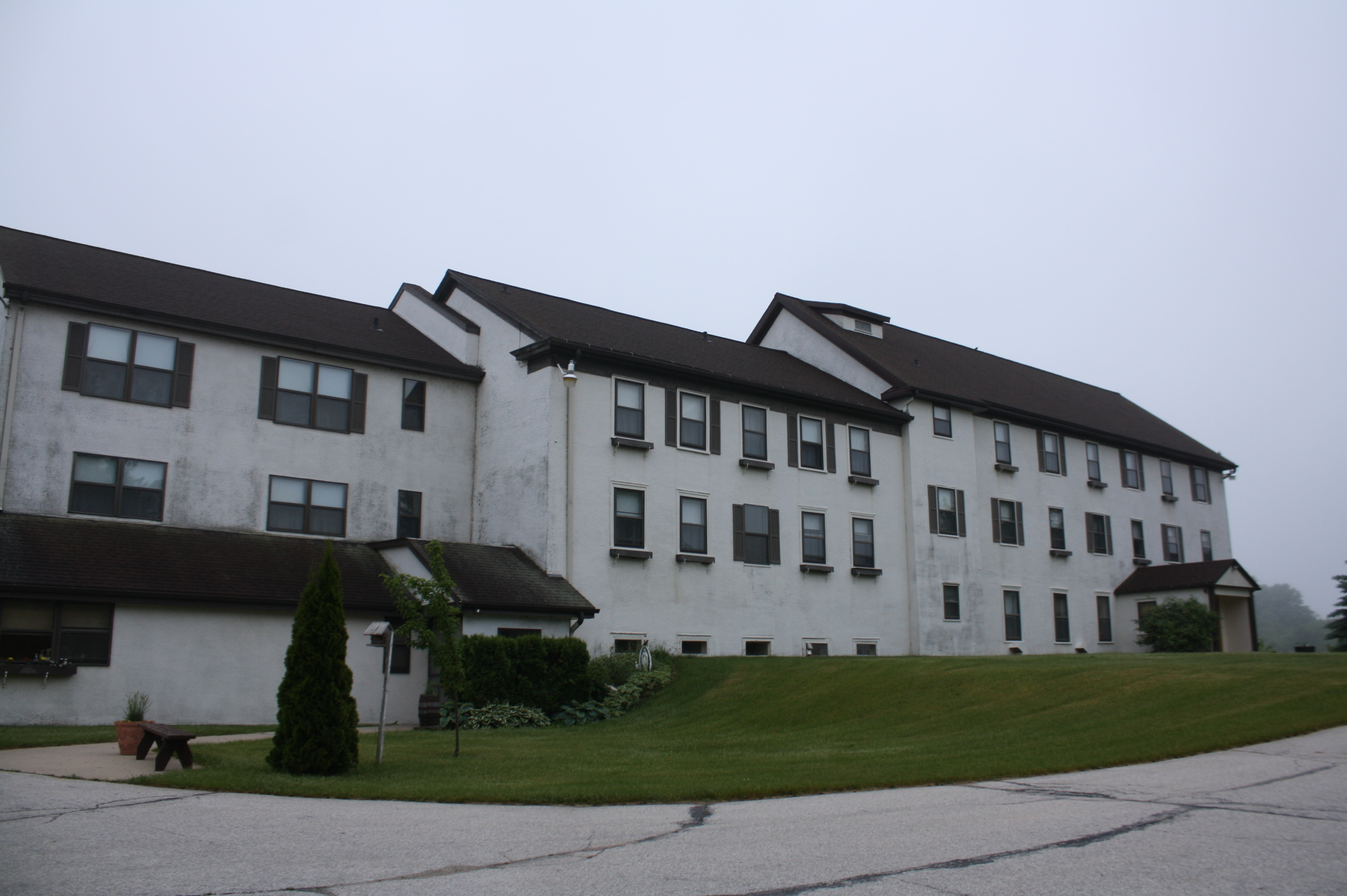
- St. Mary's Convent

- Location within Wisconsin Location within the United States
- Location: 300 S. Second Ave. St. Nazianz, Wisconsin
- Coordinates: 44°00′15″N 87°55′26″W
- Built: 1865
- NRHP reference No.: 82005120
- Added to NRHP: April 5, 2001

St. Mary's Convent is located in St. Nazianz, Wisconsin. It was built by Ambrose Oschwald, the Roman Catholic priest who founded St. Nazianz. The site was added to the National Register of Historic Places in 2001.
