= Frenchside Fishing Village =

- U.S. National Register of Historic Places
- U.S. Historic district
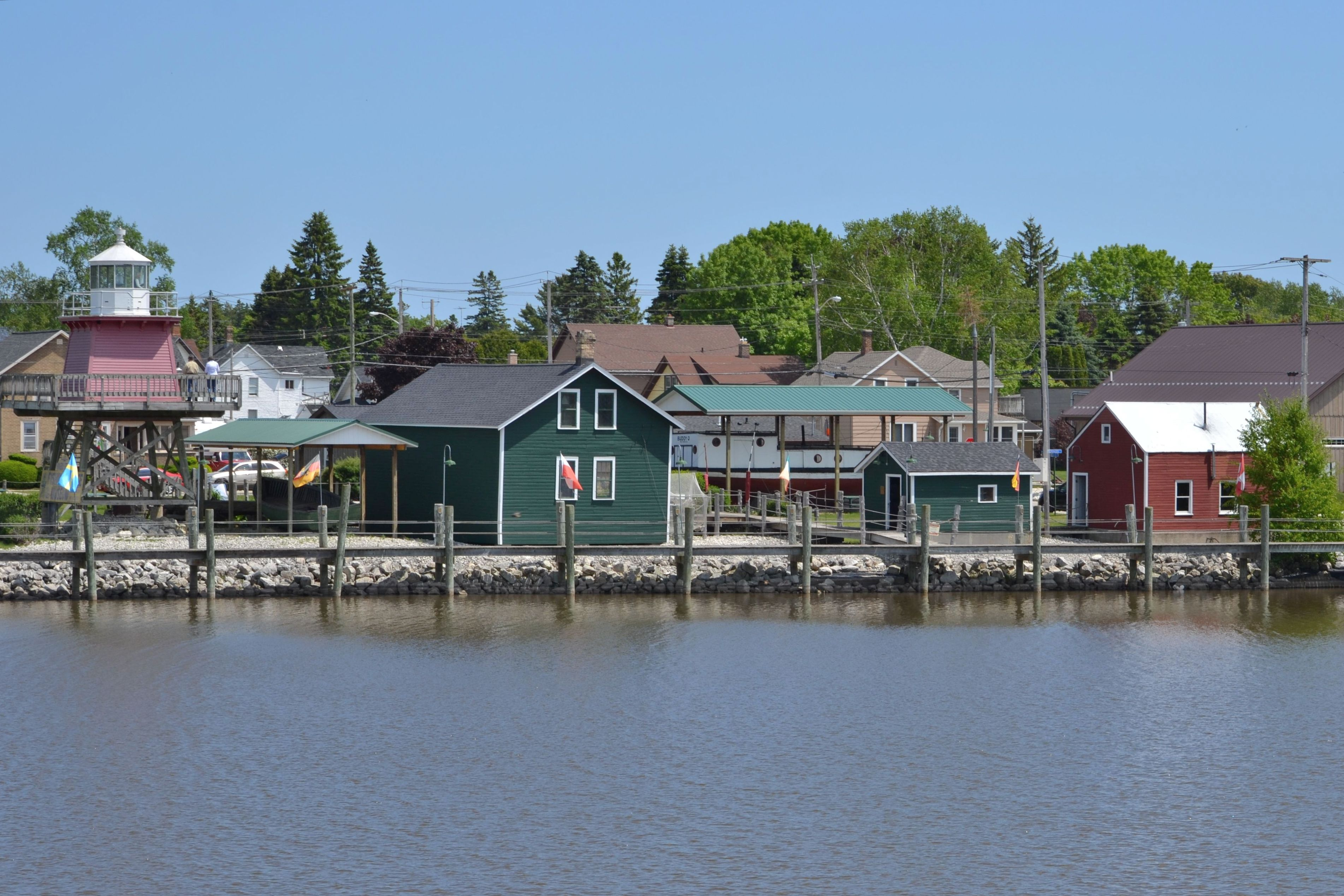
- Frenchside Fishing Village
- Location: Two Rivers, Wisconsin
- NRHP reference No.: 86003580
- Added to NRHP: January 6, 1987

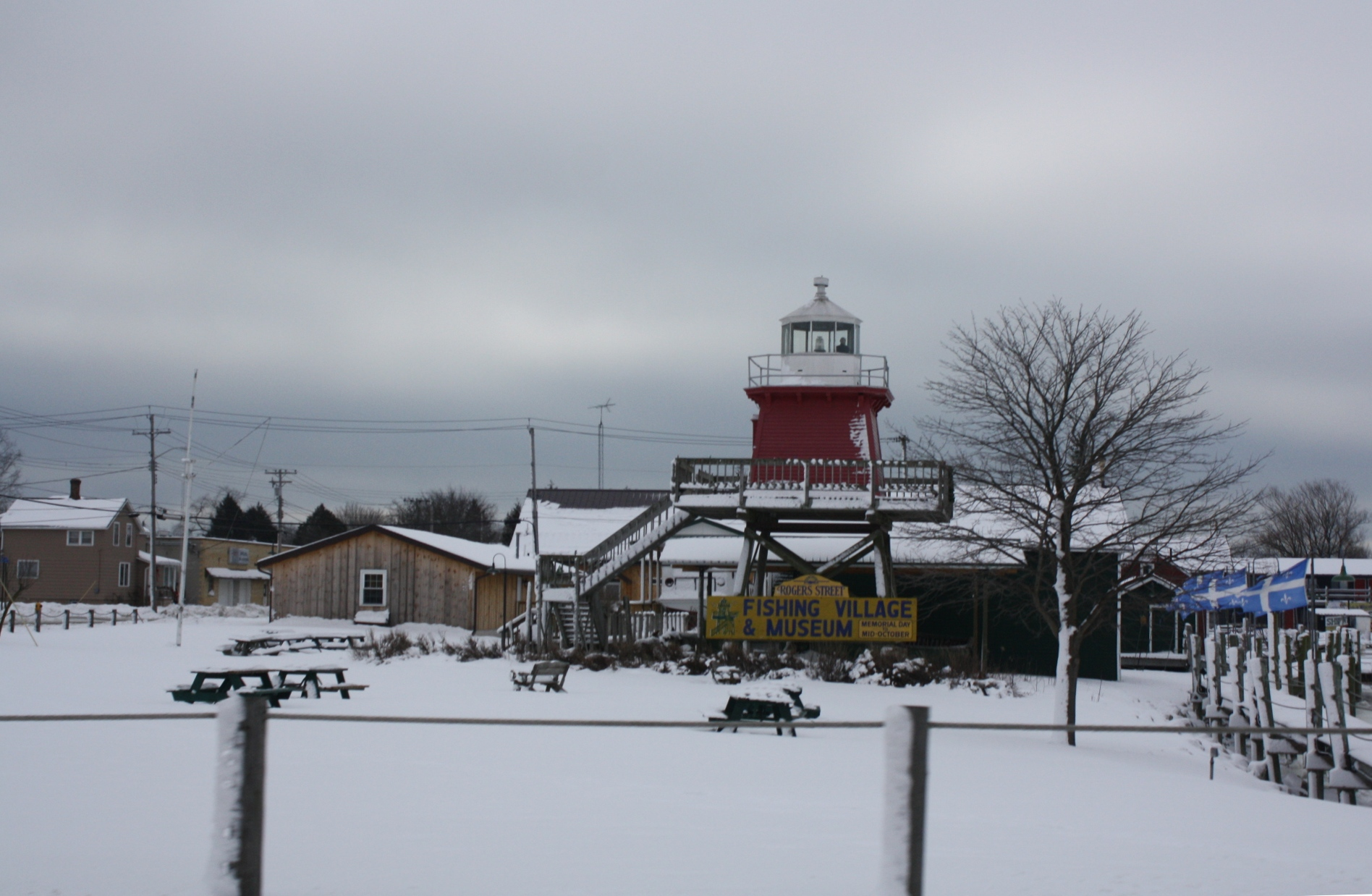
Village in winter

The Frenchside Fishing Village is located in Two Rivers, Wisconsin. It was added to the National Register of Historic Places in 1987.

== History ==
The area was originally largely inhabited by French Canadian immigrants. It became the longest-running commercial fishing district on the Great Lakes and would come to have the largest fleet as well.
