= Kiel Mill =

- U.S. National Register of Historic Places
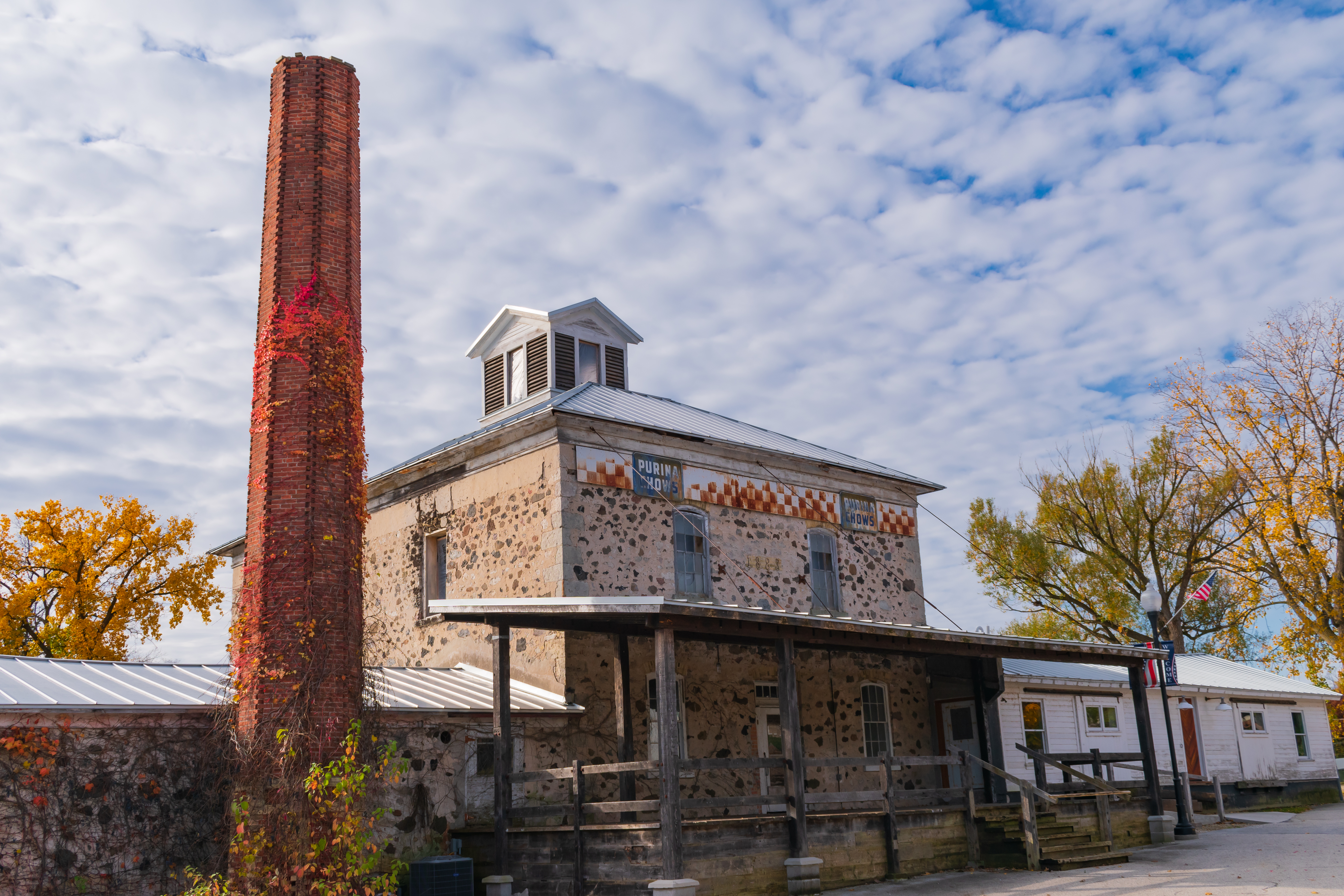
- Kiel Mill

- Location within Wisconsin
- Location: 11 Fremont St, Kiel, Wisconsin
- Coordinates: 43.91244°N 88.02690°W
- Built: 1883
- Architect: Carl Koeser
- NRHP reference No.: 100007129
- Added to NRHP: February 4, 2022

The Kiel Mill is a historic grinding and feed mill located in Kiel, Wisconsin. It was added to the Wisconsin State Register of Historic Places in 2021, and the National Register of Historic Places in 2022.

== History ==
The mill was built by German-born William Meyer in 1883 on property he owned along the Sheboygan River. It was the city's first and only water-powered flour mill. By 1893, the mill transitioned from flour milling to grinding feed for livestock. In 1894, a powerhouse was built to accommodate steam power. The new wing suffered a fire in 1897 but was quickly rebuilt.

Meyer sold the mill to the Kiel Grain and Milling Company in 1901. A brick chimney was added in 1902. Harry and Walter Klemme purchased the mill in 1919 and 1920, respectively, and owned it until 1953, during which time it was converted to electrical power and a warehouse was added.

== Modern use ==
After milling operations ceased in 1981, the building housed a Salvation Army location and a woodworking shop. Other attempts to restore the mill for commercial use failed, and the building stood vacant for 20 years. As of 2020, the Kiel Mill is under restoration, with a portion of the property anticipated for mixed-use residential.
