= Centerville, Manitowoc County, Wisconsin =

Centerville, Wisconsin
- Town
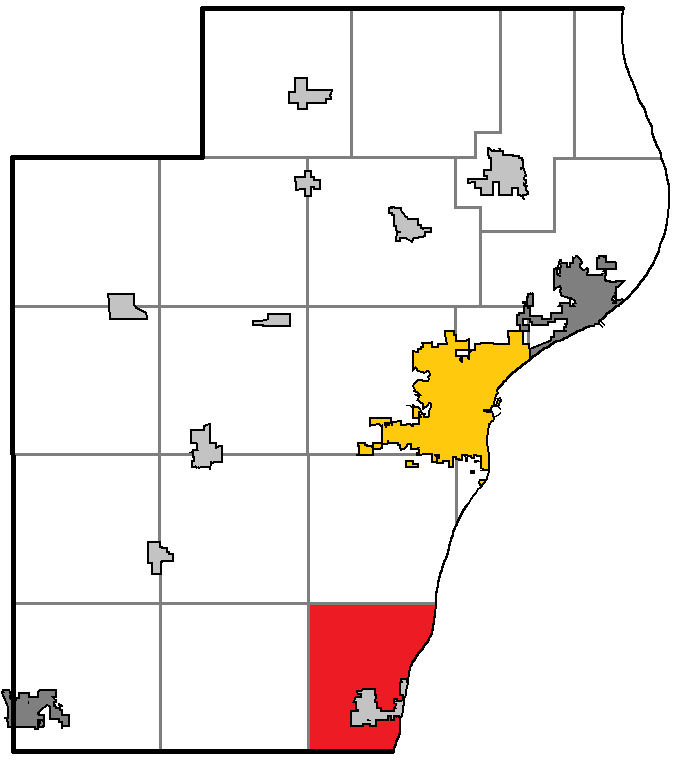
- Location of Centerville, within Manitowoc County
- Coordinates: 43°56′13″N 87°44′45″W
- Country: United States
- State: Wisconsin
- County: Manitowoc

Area
  - Total: 26.5 sq mi (68.7 km^{2})
  - Land: 23.8 sq mi (61.7 km^{2})
  - Water: 2.7 sq mi (7.0 km^{2})
- Elevation: 673 ft (205 m)

Population (2020)
  - Total: 631
  - Density: 26.5/sq mi (10.2/km^{2})
- Time zone: UTC-6 (Central (CST))
  - Summer (DST): UTC-5 (CDT)
- Area code: 920
- FIPS code: 55-13750
- GNIS feature ID: 1582943
- Website: townofcenterville.us

Centerville is a town in Manitowoc County, Wisconsin, United States. The population was 631 at the 2020 census. The town is divided by I-43 and surrounds the Village of Cleveland.

== Geography ==
According to the United States Census Bureau, the town has a total area of 26.5 square miles (68.7 km^{2}), of which 23.8 square miles (61.7 km^{2}) is land and 2.7 square miles (7.0 km^{2}) (10.18%) is water.

== Demographics ==
At the 2000 census there were 713 people, 239 households, and 196 families living in the town. The population density was 29.9 people per square mile (11.6/km^{2}). There were 262 housing units at an average density of 11.0 per square mile (4.2/km^{2}). The racial makeup of the town was 98.18% White, 0.98% Native American, 0.14% Asian, and 0.70% from two or more races. Hispanic or Latino people of any race were 1.26%.

Of the 239 households, 36.0% had children under the age of 18 living with them, 71.1% were married couples living together, 3.3% had a female householder with no husband present, and 17.6% were non-families. 15.1% of households were one person and 4.6% were one person aged 65 or older. The average household size was 2.98 and the average family size was 3.32.

The age distribution was 29.5% under the age of 18, 7.6% from 18 to 24, 25.0% from 25 to 44, 25.8% from 45 to 64, and 12.2% 65 or older. The median age was 38 years. For every 100 females, there were 116.7 males. For every 100 females age 18 and over, there were 115.0 males.

The median household income was $58,750 and the median family income was $62,647. Males had a median income of $34,375 versus $26,250 for females. The per capita income for the town was $18,638. About 1.0% of families and 2.1% of the population were below the poverty line, including 2.0% of those under age 18 and 2.0% of those age 65 or over.

== Notable people ==
- Wilhelm Albers, Wisconsin State Representative
- John Egan, Wisconsin State Representative
- John Lorfeld, Wisconsin State Representative
- Peter Reuther, Wisconsin State Representative
- Mark Tobey, abstract painter; born in Centerville

== Shipwrecks ==
Shipwrecks off the coast of Centerville:

- Gallinipper
- Home
