= Gallinipper =

Schooner that sank in Lake Michigan

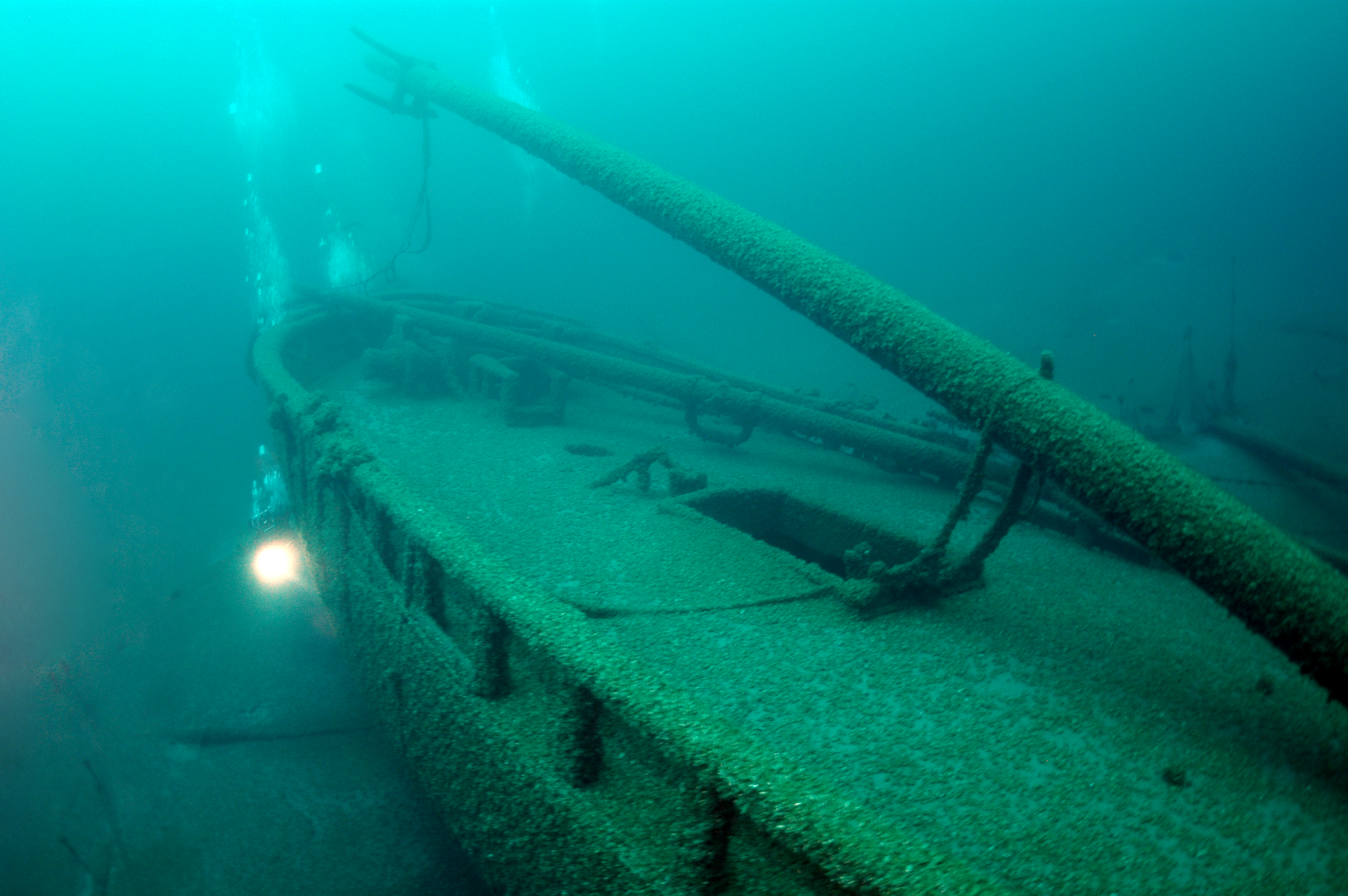
- Wreck of the Gallinipper

History

United States
- Name: Nancy Dousman
- Builder: Augustus Jones and G. W. Cochran, Black River, Ohio
- Completed: 1833
- Renamed: Gallinipper, c. 1846
- Home port: Chicago, Illinois
- Fate: Sank July 1851

General characteristics
- Type: Schooner
- Length: 95 feet (29 m)
- Beam: 21.8 feet (6.6 m)
- Depth: 7.9 feet (2.4 m)
- Propulsion: Sails
- Sail plan: Two-masted schooner rig

- Gallinipper Shipwreck (Schooner)
- U.S. National Register of Historic Places
- Location within Wisconsin Location within the United States
- Location: Lake Michigan off the coast of Centerville, Manitowoc County, Wisconsin
- Coordinates: 43.912986°N 87.484484°W
- NRHP reference No.: 10001091
- Added to NRHP: December 28, 2010

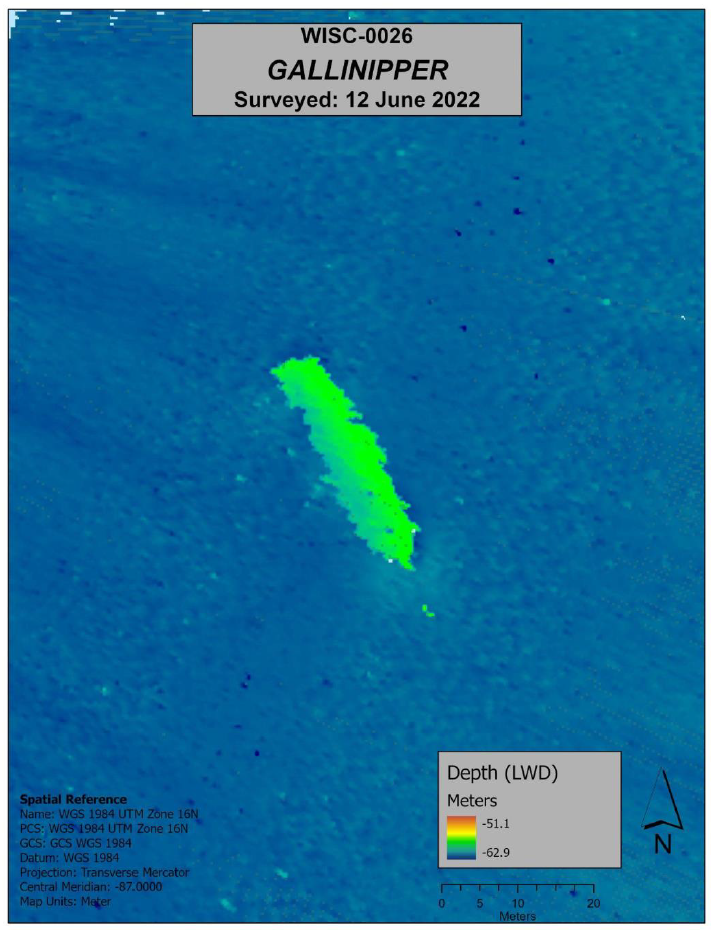
Sonar image of the wreck of Gallinipper, June 12, 2022.

Gallinipper was a schooner that sank in Lake Michigan off the coast of Centerville, Manitowoc County, Wisconsin, United States. In 2010, the shipwreck site was added to the National Register of Historic Places.

== Service history ==
=== Nancy Dousman ===
Originally named Nancy Dousman, the ship was built in 1833 by Augustus Jones and G. W. Cochran on the Black River in Ohio, for Michael Dousman, the western agent for John Jacob Astor's American Fur Company. Named for Dousman's daughter Nancy, Nancy Dousman carried goods from the eastern United States to the Wisconsin Territory frontier and returned with furs from the frontier for markets in the eastern United States. Nancy Dousman also carried employees of the American Fur Company and other passengers, including immigrants who settled the Wisconsin Territory's frontier. In addition to his work for the fur company, Dousman established a warehouse, gristmill, and sawmill at Milwaukee, Wisconsin Territory, in 1835, and he used Nancy Dousman to bring supplies to Milwaukee and transport grain to markets in the eastern United States.

Nancy Dousman was sold to new owners a number of times. She ran aground at least twice, but was refloated each time.

=== Gallinipper ===
In 1846, shipwright Henry Gibson rebuilt the ship at Milwaukee, increasing her cargo capacity. Renamed Gallinipper, she returned to service, based at Milwaukee and engaged in transporting cargoes of lumber. She again was sold and resold, and experienced a number of mishaps, sinking at Beaver Island in Lake Michigan on July 7, 1848, running aground at Milwaukee in 1850; and sinking at the mouth of the Milwaukee River in May 1851. She was refloated and returned to service each time.

During a voyage from Milwaukee, Wisconsin, to Bay de Noque, Michigan, to pick up a cargo of lumber and carrying a crew of seven and two passengers, Gallinipper capsized in Lake Michigan 8 to 10 nautical miles (15 to 19 km; 9.2 to 11.5 mi) off the coast of Wisconsin between Manitowoc and Sheboygan during a rain squall on July 7, 1851. She righted herself, but then capsized again, and her crew and passengers abandoned ship and were rescued by the schooner Cleopatra. Waterlogged, Gallinipper became mostly submerged, but did not sink. The schooner Crook sighted her on 9 July 1851 and reported her to be nearly underwater. The schooner Convoy later made an unsuccessful attempt to take her under tow 10 nautical miles (19 km; 12 mi) from Manitowoc, but gave up and abandoned her 10 nautical miles (19 km; 12 mi) southeast by east of Manitowoc after salvaging her mainsail, main boom, and main gaff. Despite a search for her by her captain, she was not found again and was presumed to have sunk. Valued at USD3,000 and insured for USD2,000, she was declared a total loss.

== Wreck ==
Gallinipper′s wreck was discovered in 1994 in 210 feet (64 m) of water by a commercial fisherman whose fishing nets snagged on it. The wreck remained unidentified until a 2009 archaeological survey of it by the Wisconsin Historical Society. On December 28, 2010, the shipwreck site was placed on the National Register of Historic Places. The wreck was included within the boundaries of the Wisconsin Shipwreck Coast National Marine Sanctuary when it was created in 2021.

Gallinipper′s wreck is the oldest known shipwreck in Wisconsin's waters. It is a rare example of an early Great Lakes trading schooner. Few trading schooners were built for service on the western Great Lakes, and little other evidence of them remains, despite their importance in maintaining trade and communication among frontier communities on the Great Lakes and between them and cities in the eastern United States.

The wreck lies off Centerville in the waters of Manitowoc County, Wisconsin, 9.5 miles (15.3 km) east of Hika Bay Park. It sits upright on the lake bottom with its bow slightly higher than its stern and with a 20-degree list to starboard. The hull is intact and covered by silt and mussels. The standing rigging has been damaged by fishing nets snagging on it and efforts by fishermen to free the nets, resulting in the mainmast being pulled from the mast step and toppling forward so that it rests at an angle over the bow, the foremast breaking loose from the hull and coming to the surface, and most of the rest of the rigging—including a boom, gaff, topmast, and two yards—being deposited on the lake floor to starboard of the wreck. Fishing net is wrapped around the stern, runs along the lake bed on either side of the hull, and is draped over the mainmast and forward deck.

Gallinipper's foremast is on display at the Rogers Street Fishing Village in Two Rivers, Wisconsin.

== See also ==
- National Register of Historic Places listings in Manitowoc County, Wisconsin
- List of shipwrecks in the Great Lakes
