= Lake Sisseton =

Lake in the state of Minnesota, United States

- Location within Minnesota
- Location: Martin County, Minnesota
- Coordinates: 43°39′5″N 94°28′5″W
- Type: lake

Sisseton Lake is a lake in Martin County, in the U.S. state of Minnesota.

Sisseton Lake was named for the Sisseton Sioux.
