= Christ H. Tegen =

American architect

Christian H. Tegen (1853 – March 19, 1917), often known as Christ H. Tegen, was a German-born American architect who designed a number of civic structures in Wisconsin.

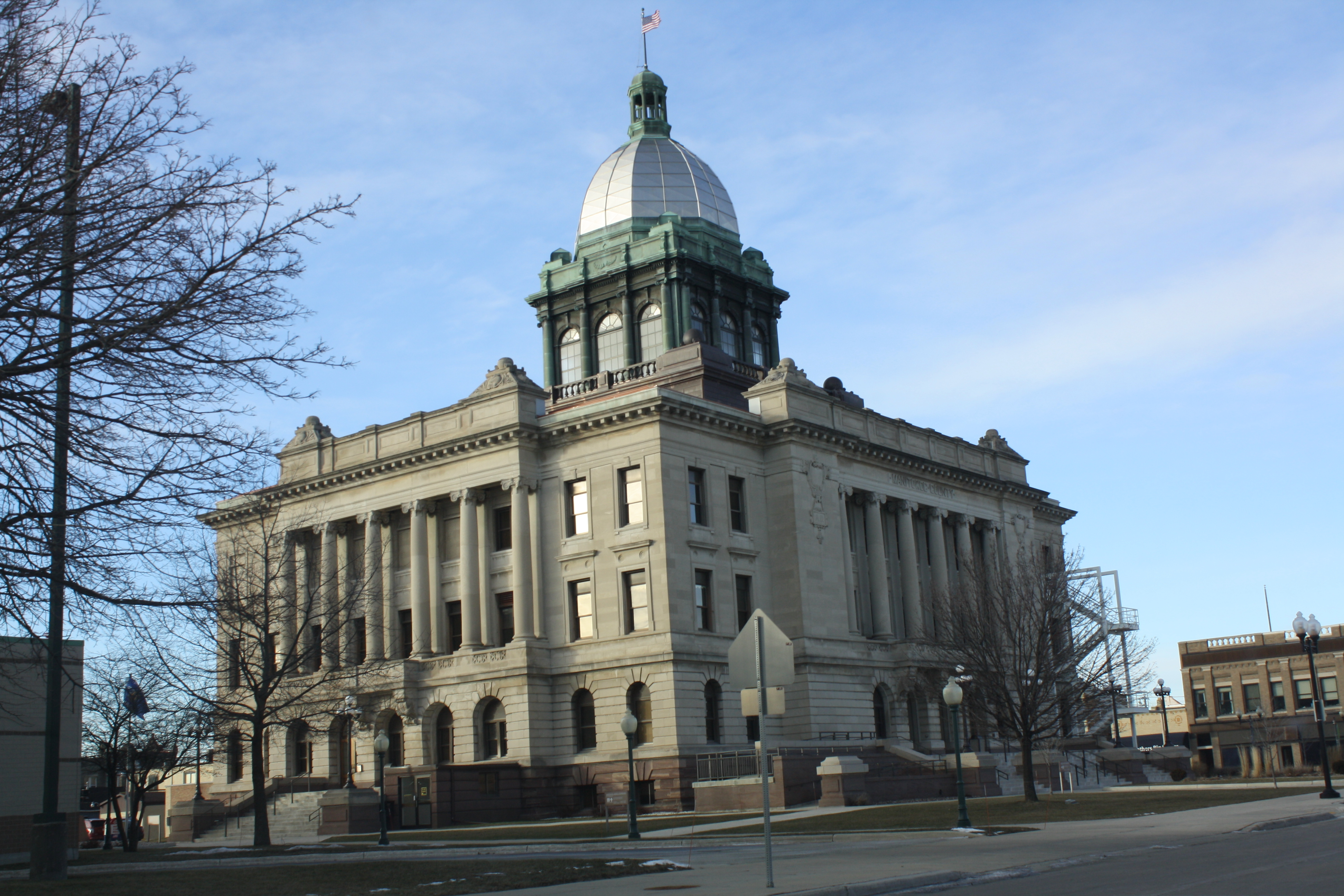
Manitowoc County Courthouse, another view

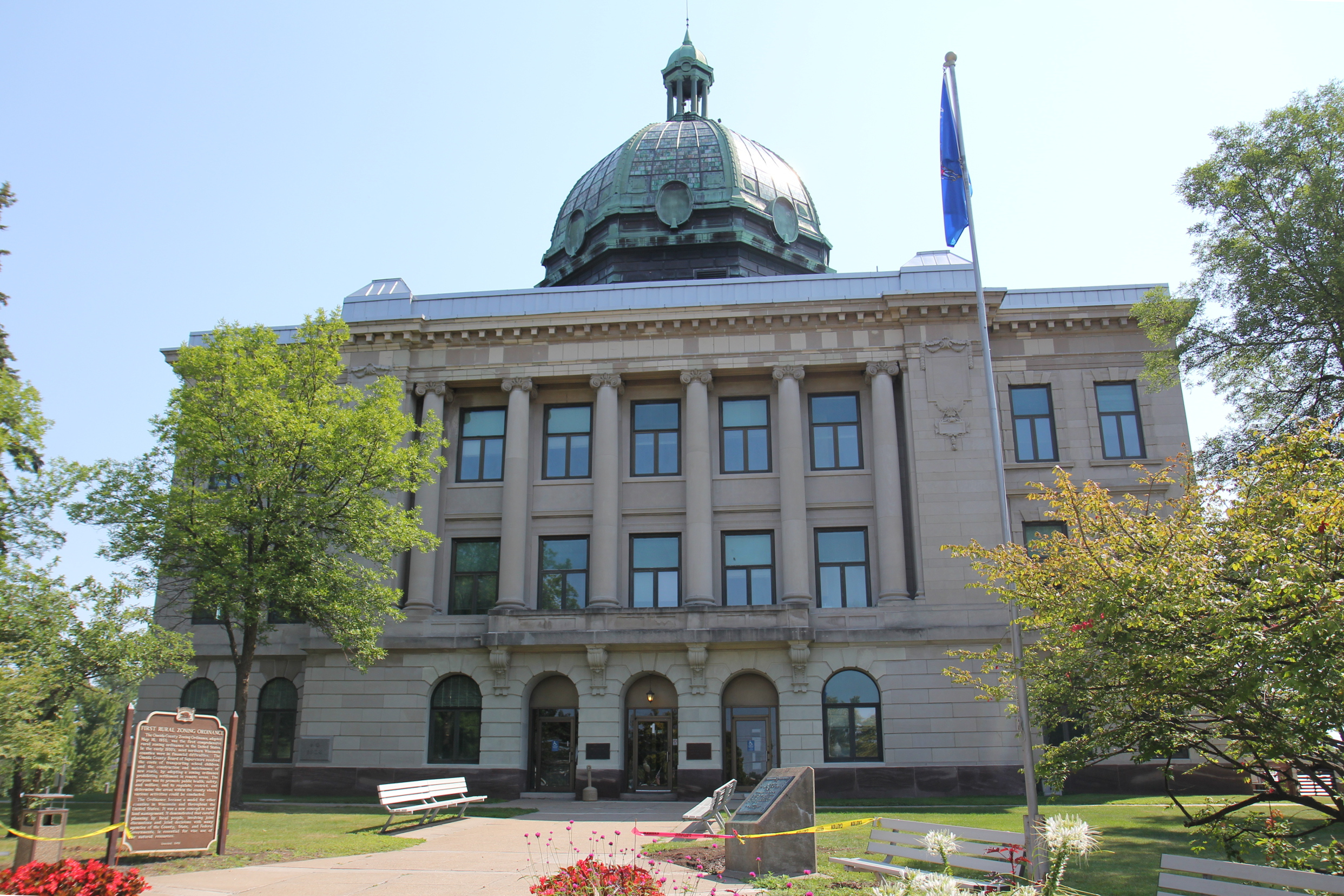
Oneida County Courthouse

He was "the most prominent of the city's early architects" He was said to be "designer of 'many of the largest and most beautiful buildings in Manitowoc'" Two of his works are listed on the U.S. National Register of Historic Places for their architecture.

He went to high school and to the Polytechnic School in Hamburg, and to the Holtzmann Polytechnic Institute.

He emigrated to the United States in 1883. His retirement was announced in 1916.

Works include:

- Manitowoc County Courthouse, Manitowoc, Wisconsin, built in 1906, listed on the National Register of Historic Places for its architecture Its dome was originally glass windows, but the windows were replaced by steel in 1950 after storm damage.
- Oneida County Courthouse, Rhinelander, Wisconsin (built 1908–1910), Renaissance-Beaux Arts, listed on the National Register of Historic Places for its architecture
- the Dempsey Block, Manitowoc, 102–108 N. Eighth Street (1902 (p123) or 1910 (p138)) a "white tile Neoclassical commercial building" with "heavy cornices" and more
- the Manitowoc Insane Asylum, Manitowoc (1885)
- the Holy Family Hospital, Manitowoc (1890)
- the Luling School, 1010 Huron Ave, Manitowoc, named for Charles Luling, (a school board member and Manitowoc's second mayor) which later became the McKinley Academy. As of 2025, it is being converted to affordable housing.
- the Williams Block, Manitowoc
- Manitowoc County Jail, since demolished

Both the Manitowoc and the Oneida courthouses feature spacious light courts under their glass domes.

== See also ==
- Franz E. Rohrbeck
