= Green County Courthouse (Wisconsin) =

- U.S. National Register of Historic Places
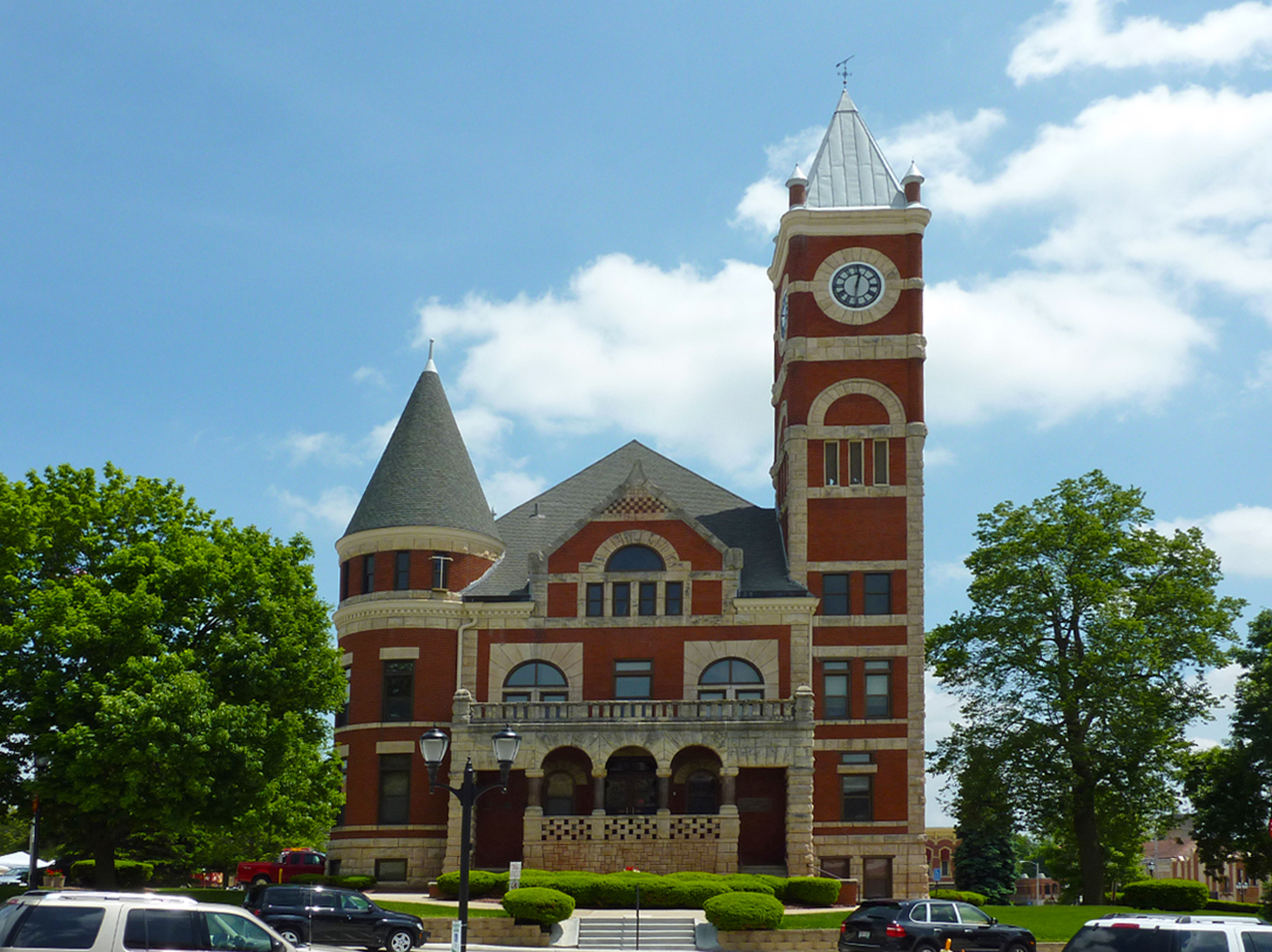
- West side of the courthouse

- Location within Wisconsin Location within the United States
- Interactive map showing the location of Green County Courthouse
- Location: Courthouse Sq., Monroe, Wisconsin
- Coordinates: 42°36′6″N 89°38′21″W
- Area: 2.1 acres (0.85 ha)
- Built: 1891
- Architect: G. Stanley Mansfield
- Architectural style: Richardsonian Romanesque
- NRHP reference No.: 78000097
- Added to NRHP: March 21, 1978

The Green County Courthouse, located on Courthouse Square in Monroe, is the county courthouse serving Green County, Wisconsin. Built in 1891, it is the county's second permanent courthouse. Architect G. Stanley Mansfield designed the Richardsonian Romanesque building. The courthouse was added to the National Register of Historic Places in 1978.

== History ==
Before Green County had a permanent courthouse, it conducted government business in the American House, a Monroe hotel which the county helped pay to build. In 1844, the county's first dedicated courthouse, a two-story Greek Revival structure, opened at the site of the present building; it served the county until it needed a larger space toward the end of the 19th century. After Monroe fought off a bid by nearby Monticello to claim the county seat, the present courthouse was built in 1891; it has functioned as the seat of county government ever since.

The courthouse was listed on the National Register of Historic Places on March 21, 1978.

== Architecture ==
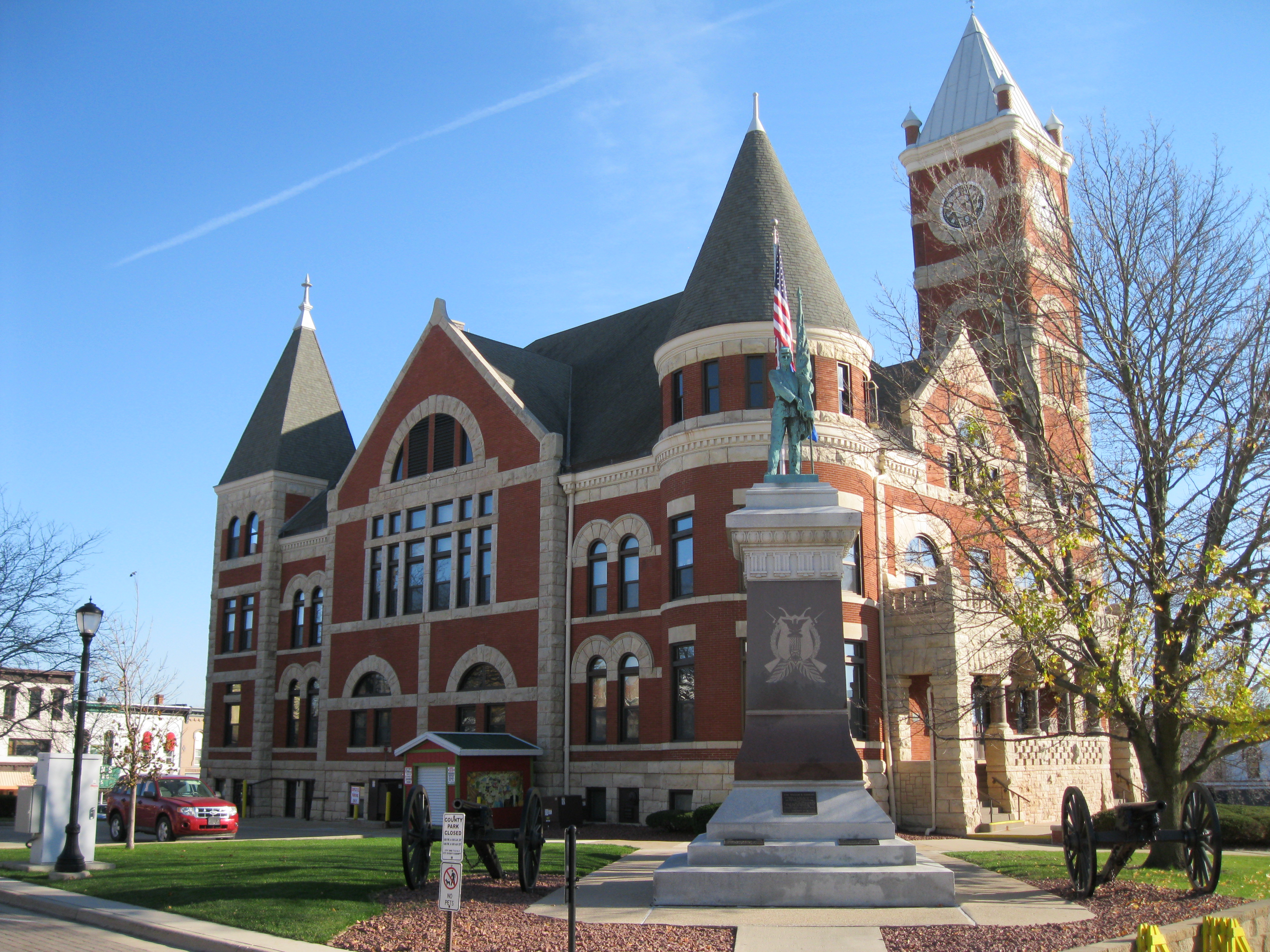
Northwest corner of the courthouse, with the war memorial in front

Architect G. Stanley Mansfield, a courthouse architect who also planned the Clinton County Courthouse in Iowa, designed the Richardsonian Romanesque courthouse. The two-and-one-half story building is built from red brick and limestone, the typical building materials of Romanesque architecture. A 120-foot (37 m) clock tower rises from the southwest corner of the building; smaller towers mark the other three corners. Limestone porches on the east and west sides cover the courthouse's two main entrances. Both the entranceways and the north and south sides' windows feature heavy limestone arches, a common Romanesque feature. The courthouse occupies a courthouse square which it shares with a Civil War memorial; the square is surrounded by Monroe's downtown commercial district.

Artist Franz Rohrbeck painted two paintings displayed in one of the courthouse's court rooms. Rohrbeck, a German immigrant, painted murals in government buildings throughout the Midwest; one of his larger murals can be found in the Wisconsin State Capitol. The courthouse's two paintings are smaller oil murals, each one 8 by 11 feet (2.4 by 3.4 m) and depicting a subject related to the concept of justice.

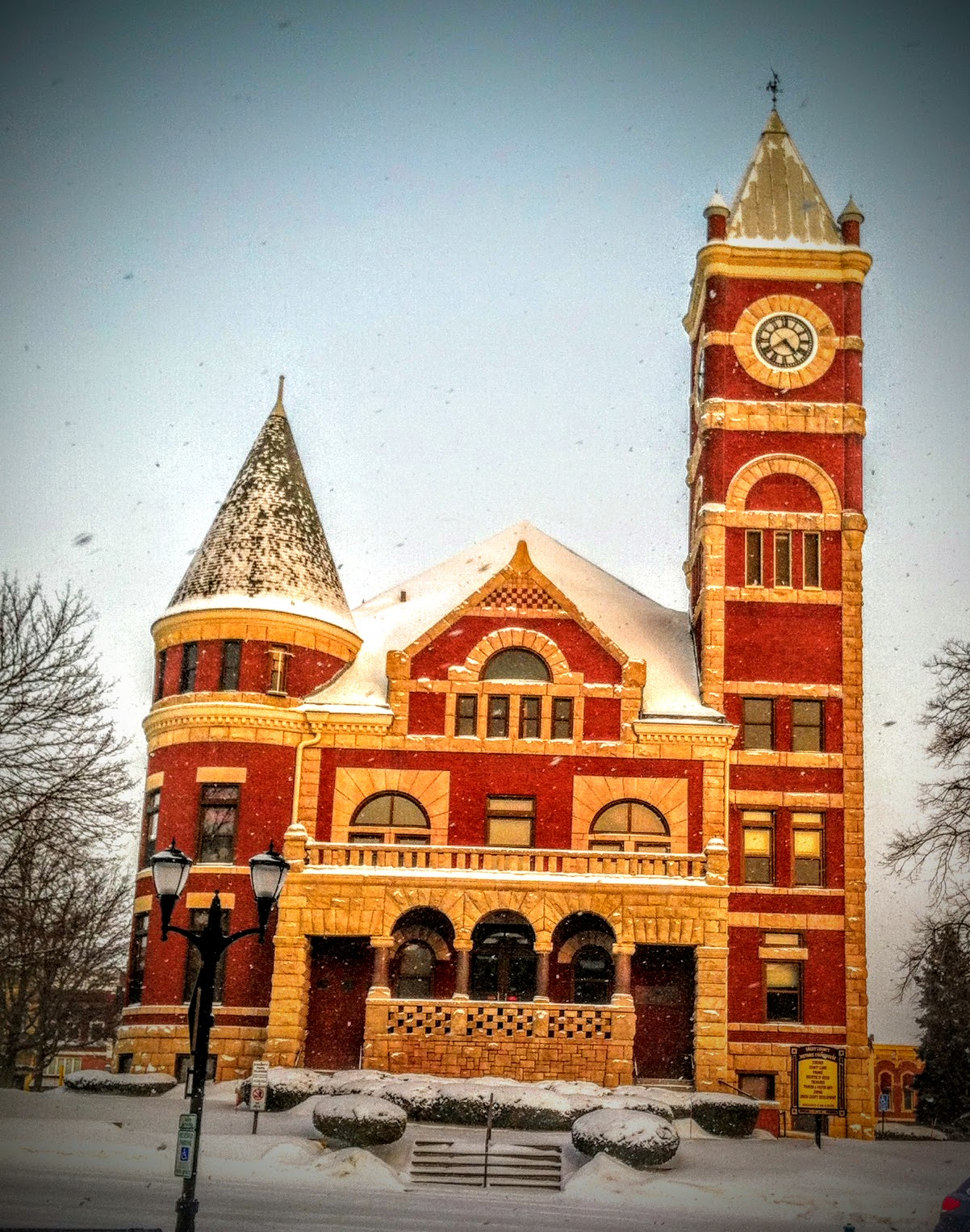
The courthouse in winter
