= Ryans Corner, Wisconsin =

- Unincorporated community
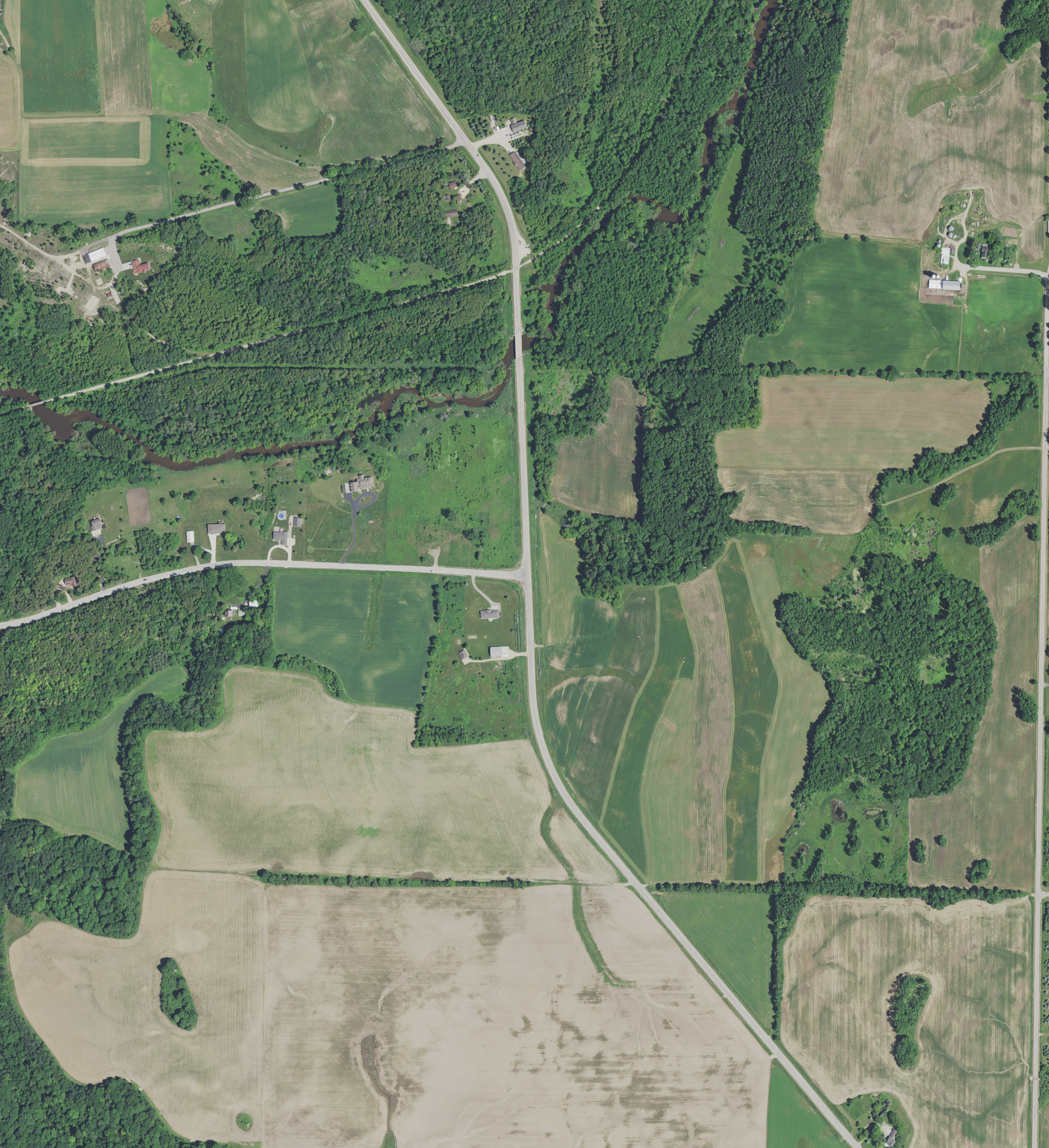
- Ryans Corner on August 7, 2020. County Trunk Highway A (left) and County Trunk Highway C make a T-intersection. The Kewaunee River is visible to the north of Ryans Corner, and the Ahnapee State Trail is visible to the north of the river.

- Location within Wisconsin Location within the United States
- Coordinates: 44°30′48″N 87°36′28″W
- Country: United States
- State: Wisconsin
- County: Kewaunee
- Town: Casco
- Elevation: 679 ft (207 m)
- Time zone: UTC-6 (Central (CST))
  - Summer (DST): UTC-5 (CDT)
- Area code: 920
- GNIS feature ID: 1577805

Ryans Corner is an unincorporated community in the town of Casco, in Kewaunee County, Wisconsin, United States. It was named after a local landowner, T. Ryan.

== See also ==
- Casco, Wisconsin
- Casco Junction, Wisconsin
