= List of historical markers in Kewaunee County, Wisconsin =

List of historical markers in Kewaunee County, Wisconsin

Kewaunee County Wisconsin

== Historical markers ==
| Marker title | Image | Date dedicated | Location | Brief Description |
| Father Marquette | | November 1, 1936 | Marker is in Father Marquette Memorial Park, Kewaunee, Wisconsin, in site of the Kewaunee Pierhead Light. 44.465133°N 87.49615°W | "Father Marquette offered the Holy Sacrifice of Mass on this spot November 1, 1674." |
| Car-Ferry Service | | 1964 | Marker is at the end of Hathaway Drive, in Harbor Point Park, Kewaunee, Wisconsin. 44.46005°N 87.499933°W | Location of car ferry service to Michigan. |
| Early History of Kewaunee | | 2000 | Marker is located next to a parking lot at the intersection of Harrison and Main Streets in front of the Tug Ludington, Kewaunee, Wisconsin. 44.459643°N 87.50171°W | History of Kewaune, including the "gold rush". |
| The Old Mill | | 2000 | Marker is located C.D. "Buzz" Besadny Anadromous Fish Facility lookout point at N3884 Ransom Moore Lane, Kewaunee, Wisconsin. 44.4627967°N 087.5593383°W | History of the old mill and its importance in the annual sucker run. |
| Kewaunee County Lime Kilns | | 1996 | Marker is located in the back portion of Kewaunee County Bruemmer Park and Zoo E4927 County Highway F Kewaunee, Wisconsin. 44.45975°N 87.550867°W | History of local lime production and lime kilns within sight of marker. |

== See also ==
National Register of Historic Places listings in Kewaunee County, Wisconsin
