= Kewaunee County, Wisconsin =

County in Wisconsin, United States

- County
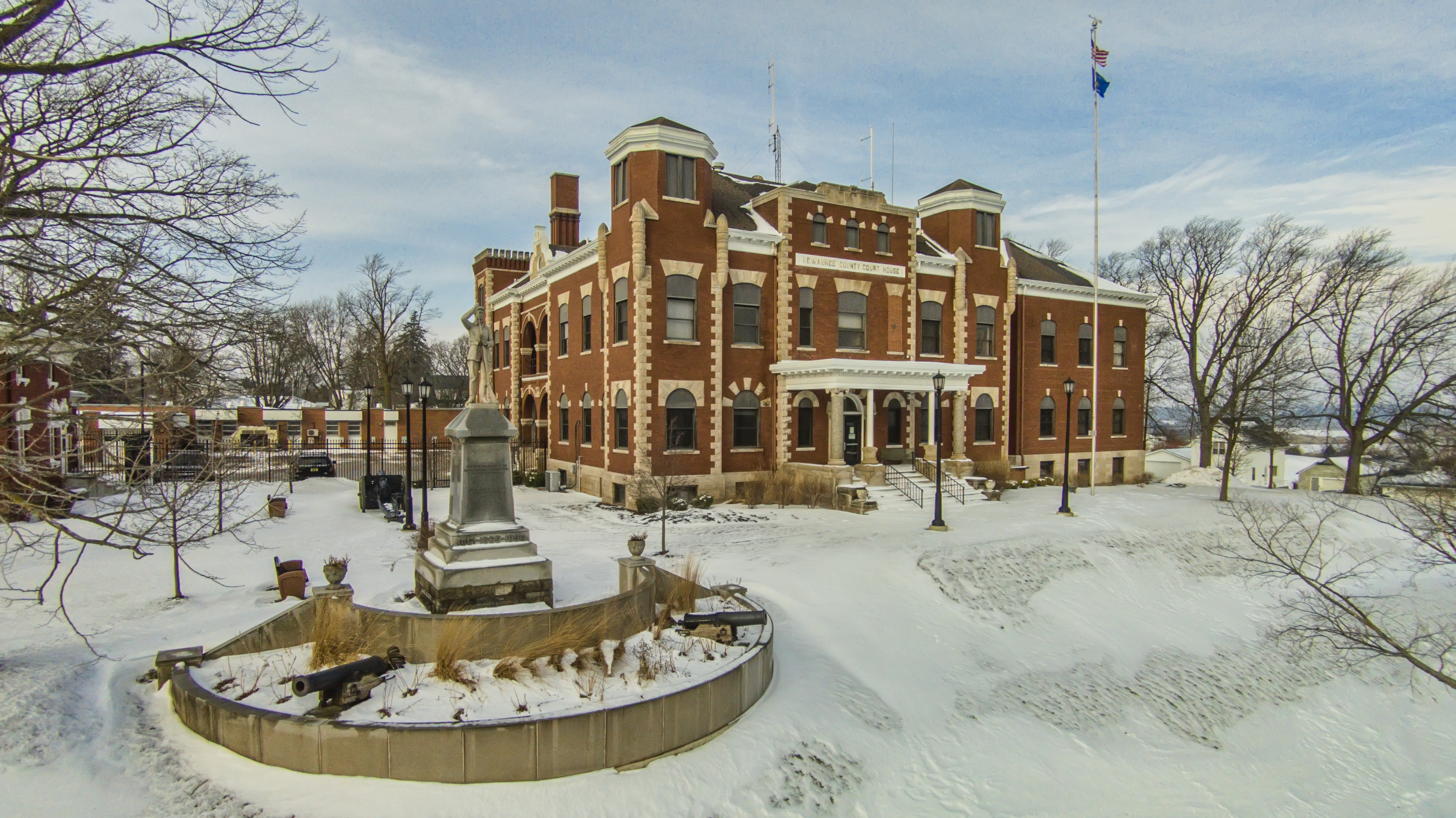
- Kewaunee County Courthouse

- Location within the U.S. state of Wisconsin
- Coordinates: 44°35′N 87°26′W
- Country: United States
- State: Wisconsin
- Founded: 1859
- Seat: Kewaunee
- Largest city: Algoma

Area
  - Total: 1,084 sq mi (2,810 km^{2})
  - Land: 343 sq mi (890 km^{2})
  - Water: 742 sq mi (1,920 km^{2}) 68%

Population (2020)
  - Total: 20,563
  - Estimate (2025): 20,758 ▲
  - Density: 60/sq mi (23/km^{2})
- Time zone: UTC−6 (Central)
  - Summer (DST): UTC−5 (CDT)
- Congressional district: 8th
- Website: www.kewauneeco.org

Kewaunee County is a county located in the U.S. state of Wisconsin. As of the 2020 census, the population was 20,563. Its county seat is Kewaunee. The county was created in 1852 and organized in 1859. Its Menominee name is Kewāneh, an archaic name for a species of duck. Kewaunee County is part of the Green Bay, WI Metropolitan Statistical Area as well as the Green Bay-Shawano, WI Combined Statistical Area. Uniquely in Wisconsin, the county is considered both a high-farming concentration county and a high-manufacturing county by the U.S. Department of Agriculture, meaning at least 20 percent of its earnings came from agriculture and at least 25 percent came from manufacturing.

== Fishing and boating ==
In 2018, Kewaunee County ranked first in the state in the Chinook salmon harvest, with 26,557 fish caught, with nearby Door County ranking second at 14,268 fish caught. Chinook salmon are sought after by tourists enjoying chartered fishing trips.

The state record rainbow trout was set in 1997 at 27 pounds, 2 ounces and 42.5 inches long. It came from the Kewaunee County portion of Lake Michigan. In 1999 the state record pink salmon was also caught in Lake Michigan out of Kewaunee County waters. It was 6 pounds, 1.9 ounces and was 24.0 inches long. In 2005, the state record white perch was taken out of the Kewaunee County portion of Green Bay. It weighed 1 pound, 5.4 ounces and was 13.5 inches long.

Beginning in 1964, first coho and then chinook salmon were stocked in Lake Michigan. New salmon and trout fingerling stocking in the spring and egg and milt collection from late September to early November takes place at the C.D. "Buzz" Besadny Anadromous Fish Facility. The facility is a public attraction.

In recent years there has been concern that the alewife population will not support the salmon population, especially as the Chinook population has already collapsed in Lake Huron. A 2016 survey of Wisconsin anglers found they would on average pay $140 for a trip to catch Chinook salmon, $90 for lake trout, and $180 for walleye. Should the Chinook salmon fishery be replaced with a native lake trout fishery, the economic value would decrease by 80%.

A 1995 study found the greatest abundance of spawning lake trout in Lake Michigan was on the Clay Banks Reef off of Door and Kewaunee counties.

The sucker run, which was a popular fishing event in the 19th century, occurs in March and April. Suckers may be taken by frame dip nets, and the sucker run is also sought out as viewing opportunity. The smelt run also attracts fishermen.

The state recognizes 11 public boat access sites. There are 14 inland lakes or ponds in Kewaunee County. In 2012, there were 2,252 registered boats in the county. Algoma Light and Kewaunee Pierhead Light are active navigational aids for boaters. The Daniel Lyons shipwreck near Algoma is used as a dive site, but the America near Carlton is less visited by divers due to its remote location. There are 24 other known shipwrecks in county waters. The Tug Ludington in Kewaunee is operated as a museum boat.

== Parks and other lands open to the public ==
The county operates eight parks. The Dana Farm (childhood home of Ransom Asa Moore) was relocated to the Winter Park. Along with the Bruemmer Park and Zoo, it is located near the state-owned C.D. Buzz Besadny Fish Hatchery. Two other state-owned parks are Mashek Creek Public Access and the Brusky Wildlife Area. There are also 27 municipal parks operated by the cities of Algoma, Kewaunee, and the Village of Luxembourg.

There are four public beaches in the county, three of which are routinely monitored for water quality advisories. The county and the city of Algoma each operate one beach. Kewaunee operates two beaches, There are boardwalks along the beach in Algoma and the Kewaunee Marshland Walk. Altogether there are ten public access sites to Lake Michigan and Green Bay in the county.

Limestone kiln remnants of historical interest are open to the public at the Bruemmer Park and Zoo. Although lime is not presently produced in Kewaunee County, as of 2016, there were 9 active gravel pits producing sand and gravel for roadwork and construction use.

279.54 acres (113.13 hectares) of privately owned land is open to the public for hunting, fishing, hiking, sight-seeing and cross-country skiing under the Managed Forest Program.

== Species lists and coastal wetlands ==
The four state recognized coastal wetlands in the county are the Kewaunee River Wetland Complex, the Black Ash Swamp Area, the Ahnapee River Wetlands, and the Duvall Swamp. A 1980 inventory of natural areas recognized Duvall Swamp, Alaska Bog, Krok Woods, Kewaunee River Marshes, Cosco Tamarack Woods, Broemmer Creek Headwaters, Alaska Lake, Three Mile Creek Tag Alder, Silver Lake, Krohn's Lake, and the Ahnapee River Swamps. Historically, hypnum peat was produced in the county.

=== Plants ===
In 2016, 586 plant species were listed in a checklist for the county that excluded mosses, liverworts, and hornworts. In 2020, 33 species of mosses, liverworts, and hornworts and 125 species of macrofungi (including lichens) were listed for the county. In 1999, 8 aquatic species were found in East Alaska Lake.

=== Snails ===
From 1996 to 2001, researchers listed 48 species of snails in Kewaunee County, ranking eighth out of the 22 counties in the study. Nearby Door and Brown counties ranked first and second with 69 and 62 species respectively. However, they only sampled 13 areas in Kewaunee County, compared to 74 areas in Door and 28 areas in Brown. Slugs were found in all three counties.

=== Birds ===
As of 2020, 103 species of birds have been confirmed to breed in Kewaunee County.

In 1911, passenger pigeons were seen in the Black Ash Swamp. This was one of the last reported sightings in the state.

== Cattle and deer ==
In 2018 statistics, a county total of 3,527 deer were killed as a total of all deer hunting seasons, down from the total harvest of 3,787 deer for 2017 statistics. In 2017, Kewaunee and Door counties were reported to have equal deer-to-human ratios. Kewaunee County had the third highest cow-to-human ratio in the state, with only Lafayette and Buffalo counties having higher ratios. In 2018, there were an estimated 97,000 head of cattle in the county, more than Door County which had 23,500 head of cattle.

== Foods, agritourism, and alcohol ==
Kewaunee County is known for its kolache. Another distinctive local food is booyah. The cooking of booyah is not exclusive to Belgians, but has also been adopted by some Czechs. Cornish apple elderberry dumplings are another local dish.

In 2017, six operations tapped 1,840 trees to produce maple syrup, down from 3,024 trees tapped by three operations in 1997.

U-pick strawberries, apples, and pumpkins are grown.

There are also two Christmas tree operations. In 2017, 4,084 Christmas trees were cut, down from 4,462 in 2012.

In 2014–15, there were 96 liquor licenses in the county. The first modern winery in the state opened in Algoma in 1967. The area was recognized as part of a larger federally designated wine grape-growing region in 2012. In 2017, there were 28 acres of vineyards, down from 34 in 2012.

== Arts ==
Tourism supports an arts community, including papermaking, sculpture, and painting.

== Crops ==
The most important field crops by acres harvested in 2017 were hay and haylage at 48,887 acres, corn (silage) at 37,042 acres, corn (grain) at 22,846 acres, soybeans at 15,000 acres, wheat at 9,975 acres, oats at 2,834 acres, and barley at 146 acres.

Both sale prices and rental values of agricultural land are higher than the average for Wisconsin counties. The most common USDA soil association in the county is the Hortonville (Note: Hortonville soil series information)–Symco (Note: Symco soil series information) association. About 51 percent of soils in this association are Hortonville and 16 percent are Symco. The remaining 33% in the association are minor soils such as Carbondale, (Note: Carbondale soil series information) Pella, (Note: Pella soil series information) and Kolberg. (Note: Kolberg soil series information) Altogether, about 34.8% of the county has Hortonville-Symco association soils. In a forested environment, Hortonville and Symco soils have an average of 7.6% and 13.2% organic matter, respectably. However, as cropland they only have tested from 2% to 3% organic matter.

== Geography ==
According to the U.S. Census Bureau, the county has a total area of 1,084 square miles (2,810 km^{2}), of which 343 square miles (890 km^{2}) is land and 742 square miles (1,920 km^{2}) (68%) is water. The northern part of the county is on the Door Peninsula between Green Bay and Lake Michigan. The northern part of the Kettle Moraine extends into Kewaunee County. There are three named peaks in the county. The USGS monitors one well in the county on an hourly basis. It also takes hourly pictures of the field in front of the well. It usually takes four to five hours for the groundwater level to rise after a big rain.

=== Adjacent counties ===
- Door County – north
- Manitowoc County – south
- Brown County – west
- Benzie County, Michigan – northeast across Lake Michigan
- Manistee County, Michigan – southeast across Lake Michigan

== Transportation ==
=== Major highways ===
- Highway 29 (Wisconsin)
- Highway 42 (Wisconsin)
- Highway 54 (Wisconsin)
- Highway 57 (Wisconsin)

=== Rustic road and quilt trail ===
- There is one rustic road in the county. A quilt trail along roadside barns was organized in 2009.

=== Railroads ===
- Watco

=== Non-motorized ===
- The Ahnapee State Trail connects Kewaunee to Sturgeon Bay. The Ice Age Trail coincides with the Kewaunee County portion of the Ahnapee State Trail, and also extends further south along the East Twin River Segment. Winter snowmobile access to trails is dependent on weather and trail grooming.
- WIS 42 and 57 are part of the Lake Michigan Circle Tour.
- Riverview ATV Park includes mountain bike trails that are off limits to ATVs. It is open from May to November.

=== Airport ===
- The Rio Creek airport (also called Walter's Agri-center Airport) (WI28) is privately owned, but open to the public and includes a campground.
- The nearest international airport is the Green Bay–Austin Straubel International Airport.

=== National marine sanctuary ===
The Wisconsin Shipwreck Coast National Marine Sanctuary was established in 2021 in the waters of Lake Michigan, with its extreme northern portion lying off the southeast corner of Kewaunee County's coast. The national marine sanctuary is the site of a large number of historically significant shipwrecks.

== Demographics ==
Historical population
Census	Pop.	Note	%±
1860	5,530		—
1870	10,128		83.1%
1880	15,807		56.1%
1890	16,153		2.2%
1900	17,212		6.6%
1910	16,784		−2.5%
1920	16,091		−4.1%
1930	16,037		−0.3%
1940	16,680		4.0%
1950	17,366		4.1%
1960	18,282		5.3%
1970	18,961		3.7%
1980	19,539		3.0%
1990	18,878		−3.4%
2000	20,187		6.9%
2010	20,574		1.9%
2020	20,563		−0.1%
2025 (est.)	20,758	▲	0.9%
U.S. Decennial Census; 1790–1960 1900–1990; 1990–2000 2010–2020

=== 2020 census ===
As of the 2020 census, the population was 20,563. The population density was 60.0 people per square mile (23.2 people/km^{2}). There were 9,267 housing units at an average density of 27.1 units per square mile (10.5 units/km^{2}).

The racial makeup of the county was 93.1% White, 0.3% Black or African American, 0.4% American Indian and Alaska Native, 0.3% Asian, <0.1% Native Hawaiian and Pacific Islander, 2.4% from some other race, and 3.5% from two or more races. Hispanic or Latino residents of any race comprised 4.1% of the population.

The most commonly reported ancestries were:

- German (39.6%)
- Belgian (19.2%)
- English (9.9%)
- Czech (9.6%)
- Irish (8.4%)
- Polish (7.9%)
- French (3.1%)
- Norwegian (2.9%)
- Mexican (2.5%)
- Dutch (2.5%)

The median age was 43.8 years. 21.6% of residents were under the age of 18 and 20.6% of residents were 65 years of age or older. For every 100 females there were 102.6 males, and for every 100 females age 18 and over there were 102.3 males age 18 and over.

There were 8,397 households in the county, of which 27.7% had children under the age of 18 living in them. Of all households, 55.6% were married-couple households, 17.9% were households with a male householder and no spouse or partner present, and 19.7% were households with a female householder and no spouse or partner present. About 26.5% of all households were made up of individuals and 12.3% had someone living alone who was 65 years of age or older.

Of the 9,267 housing units, 9.4% were vacant. Among occupied housing units, 81.1% were owner-occupied and 18.9% were renter-occupied. The homeowner vacancy rate was 1.2% and the rental vacancy rate was 5.5%.

<0.1% of residents lived in urban areas, while 100.0% lived in rural areas.

=== Racial and ethnic composition ===
Kewaunee County, Wisconsin – Racial and ethnic composition Note: the US Census treats Hispanic/Latino as an ethnic category. This table excludes Latinos from the racial categories and assigns them to a separate category. Hispanics/Latinos may be of any race.
Race / ethnicity (NH = Non-Hispanic)	Pop 1980	Pop 1990	Pop 2000	Pop 2010	Pop 2020	% 1980	% 1990	% 2000	% 2010	% 2020
White alone (NH)	19,437	18,730	19,822	19,724	18,992	99.48%	99.22%	98.19%	95.87%	92.36%
Black or African American alone (NH)	7	24	27	63	57	0.04%	0.13%	0.13%	0.31%	0.28%
Native American or Alaska Native alone (NH)	23	49	53	75	55	0.12%	0.26%	0.26%	0.36%	0.27%
Asian alone (NH)	17	21	25	59	64	0.09%	0.11%	0.12%	0.29%	0.31%
Native Hawaiian or Pacific Islander alone (NH)	x	x	1	5	2	x	x	0.00%	0.02%	0.01%
Other race alone (NH)	1	0	6	15	41	0.01%	0.00%	0.03%	0.07%	0.20%
Mixed race or Multiracial (NH)	x	x	100	170	518	x	x	0.50%	0.83%	2.52%
Hispanic or Latino (any race)	54	54	153	463	834	0.28%	0.29%	0.76%	2.25%	4.06%
Total	19,539	18,878	20,187	20,574	20,563	100.00%	100.00%	100.00%	100.00%	100.00%

=== 2000 census ===
2000 Census age pyramid for Kewaunee County

As of the census of 2000, there were 20,187 people, 7,623 households, and 5,549 families residing in the county. The population density was 59 people per square mile (23 people/km^{2}). There were 8,221 housing units at an average density of 24 per square mile (9.3/km^{2}). The racial makeup of the county was 98.56% White, 0.15% Black or African American, 0.27% Native American, 0.13% Asian, 0.30% from other races, and 0.57% from two or more races. 0.76% of the population were Hispanic or Latino of any race. 36.4% were of German, 23.8% Belgian, 9.7% Czech, 6.3% Polish and 5.1% American ancestry.

There were 7,623 households, out of which 33.50% had children under the age of 18 living with them, 62.40% were married couples living together, 6.60% had a female householder with no husband present, and 27.20% were non-families. 23.50% of all households were made up of individuals, and 11.80% had someone living alone who was 65 years of age or older. The average household size was 2.61 and the average family size was 3.10.

In the county, the population was spread out, with 25.80% under the age of 18, 8.00% from 18 to 24, 28.20% from 25 to 44, 22.80% from 45 to 64, and 15.20% who were 65 years of age or older. The median age was 38 years. For every 100 females, there were 100.60 males. For every 100 females age 18 and over, there were 98.80 males.

=== Population dynamics ===
Between April 2010 and January 2019, there were an estimated 1,745 births and 1,605 deaths in the county. The greater number of births served to increase the population by an estimated 140 people. In addition, there were an estimated 68 more people who moved in than left. Combined, this positive net migration along with the natural increase raised the county population by an estimated 208 persons during this period. In 2013, a researcher predicted that in 2030 the county's population would peak then start to decline.

In 2017, there were 199 births, giving a general fertility rate of 61.8 births per 1000 women aged 15–44, the 33rd lowest rate out of all 72 Wisconsin counties. Additionally, there were 10 reported induced abortions performed on women of Kewaunee County residence in 2017.

=== Marriages ===
Five-year ACS data from 2012 to 2016 show that an estimated 5.2% of women aged 45–54 in the county had never been married, tying with 19 other counties in having the 697th lowest percentage of never-married women in this age bracket out of 3,130 U.S. counties reporting data. The ACS estimate also found that 76.3% of women aged 35–44 were married, tying with five other counties in having the 360th highest number of married women in this age bracket out of 3,136 counties reporting data, and that the county was tied with seven other counties in having the 552th lowest percentage of births to unmarried women out of 3,021 counties reporting data. 22.8% of births were to unmarried women.

In 2015, the county tied with Sawyer County in having the 13th fewest marriages in the state. It tied with Marquette County in having the 23rd fewest divorces out of all 72 Wisconsin counties. May and October tied as the months with the most weddings, with 21 each. In 2016 the county was the 19th-least populous in the state.

=== Religion ===
In 2010 statistics, the largest religious group in Kewaunee County was the Catholics, with 10,606 adherents worshipping at St. Lawrence Catholic Church in Stangelville and six other parishes, followed by 1,622 WELS Lutherans with three congregations, 1,356 LCMS Lutherans with three congregations, 318 ELCA Lutherans with one congregation, 163 NACCC Congregationalists with one congregation, 155 United Methodists with two congregations, 119 non-denominational Christians with two congregations, 90 Converge Baptists with one congregation, 70 AoG Pentecostals with one congregation, and 27 EC-USA Episcopalians at St Agnes-by-the-Lake in Algoma. Altogether, 70.6% of the population was counted as adherents of a religious congregation. In 2014, Kewaunee County had 15 religious organizations in the county.

== Public health ==
According to calculations based on 2010–2014 data, children born in Kewaunee County have a life expectancy of 82.0 years, the highest out of all 72 Wisconsin counties. From 2000 to 2010, the county premature death rate of persons younger than 75 years old fell 38.3%, the greatest reduction out of all Wisconsin counties. In 2015, 89.1% of babies born in the county had a normal birth weight, compared to 92.6% for the state. The substance abuse and preventable hospitalization rates for the county were lower than for the state as a whole. Five-year ACS estimates for 2012-2016 found that Kewaunee County tied with 23 other counties in having the 675th lowest percentage of disabled residents under 65 years old out of all 3,145 US counties. 9.7% were disabled.

A CDC survey of people reporting frequent mental distress (14-30 mentally unhealthy days in the last 30 days, data aggregated over 2003–2009) found that people in Kewaunee County were more likely to be distressed than those in most Wisconsin counties, but less likely to be distressed than those in the heavily urbanized southeast portion of the state.

From 2014 through 2017 reported cases of Lyme disease increased from 0 cases in 2014 to 5 cases in 2017.

In a study of car accident data from 1992 to 2001, the risk of incurring a severe traffic injury during a stretch of driving was found to be higher in Kewaunee County than in Door County, but Kewaunee County had fewer fatalities per 100 people severely injured than Door County. This was thought to be due to the shorter distance it took to get people injured in Kewaunee County to treatment, as the nearest hospital with a high level of trauma certification was St. Vincent Hospital in Green Bay.

=== Pollution ===
PCBs from Green Bay have been deposited into the county as windborn dust and off of contaminated waters.

The only superfund site in the county is the former Algoma Municipal Landfill.

As of 2020, the state listed the following waters in Kewaunee County as being impaired by pollution: Ahnapee River, Black Creek, Casco Creek, East Alaska Lake, East Twin River, Green Bay, Jambo Creek, Kewaunee River, Krok Creek, Lake Michigan, Neshota River, Red River, School Creek, Silver Creek, and Stony Creek. Concerns varied from waterway to waterway, but included E. coli, mercury, PCBs, phosphorus, sediment levels, and high levels of suspended solids.

Between 2010 and 2018, there were 76 state-documented manure spills in the county. The likelihood of well water contamination differs depending on which area of the county the well is located, as some areas have thicker layers of soil than others. An electronic map marks the locations of every septic system and drain field, along with situations more liable to spread fecal contamination, such as areas with a shallow water table, high permeability, or likely to have karst features. A different electronic map shows the locations of private wells polluted with nitrates and other contaminants down to the section level. Another factor is tile drainage, as relatively high amounts of phosphorus were documented from water coming from two tiled sites located on a Kewaunee County farm between 2005 and 2009. The quick drainage reduces the filtration of nutrients out of the water and into the soil. The distribution of bacterial contamination in private wells has been mapped. Some bacteria found in surface water have genes for antibiotic resistance. This is thought to be due to the bovine use of antibiotics.

== Radio stations ==
- WBDK (96.7 FM, Algoma)
- WRLU (FM 104.1, Algoma)
- WEZY (92.7 FM, Kewaunee)

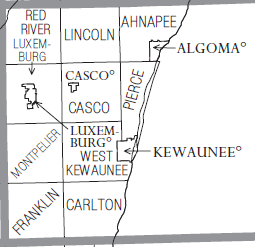
Townships of Kewaunee County

== Communities ==
=== Cities ===
- Algoma
- Kewaunee (county seat)

=== Villages ===
- Casco
- Luxemburg

=== Towns ===
- Ahnapee
- Carlton
- Casco
- Franklin
- Lincoln
- Luxemburg
- Montpelier
- Pierce
- Red River
- West Kewaunee

=== Census-designated places ===
- Dyckesville (partial)

=== Unincorporated communities ===
- Alaska
- Bay View
- Birchwood
- Bolt
- Bruemmerville
- Casco Junction
- Cherneyville
- Clyde
- Curran
- Duvall
- East Krok
- Ellisville
- Euren
- Frog Station
- Gregorville
- Kodan
- Krok
- Lincoln
- Neuren
- Norman
- Pilsen
- Rankin
- Rio Creek
- Rosiere (partial)
- Rostok
- Ryans Corner
- Slovan
- Stangelville
- Thiry Daems
- Tisch Mills (partial)
- Tonet
- Walhain

=== Former communities ===
- Black Earth

== History ==
In 1795, Jacques Vieau established a short-lived trading post in Kewaunee.

On April 16, 1852, Kewaunee County was separated from neighboring Door County.

In 1854, the first Czechs arrived, coming north from Milwaukee.

19th-century Algoma (at the time called Ahnapee) was host to a longstanding inter-ethnic economic struggle over pier pricing and access.

In 1887, an octahedrite meteorite weighing nearly nine pounds was plowed up four miles west of Algoma. It is displayed at the Geology Museum at UW–Madison.

Kewaunee and Casco Junction were connected to Green Bay in 1891 by the Kewaunee, Green Bay and Western Railroad. It later became part of the Green Bay and Western Railroad. The western portion of this line provides freight service to Luxemburg to the present day, but not further east.

The first leg of the Ahnapee and Western Railway was built in 1892.

The first Belgian Kermiss harvest festival in the nation is thought to have taken place in the county.

== Gallery ==
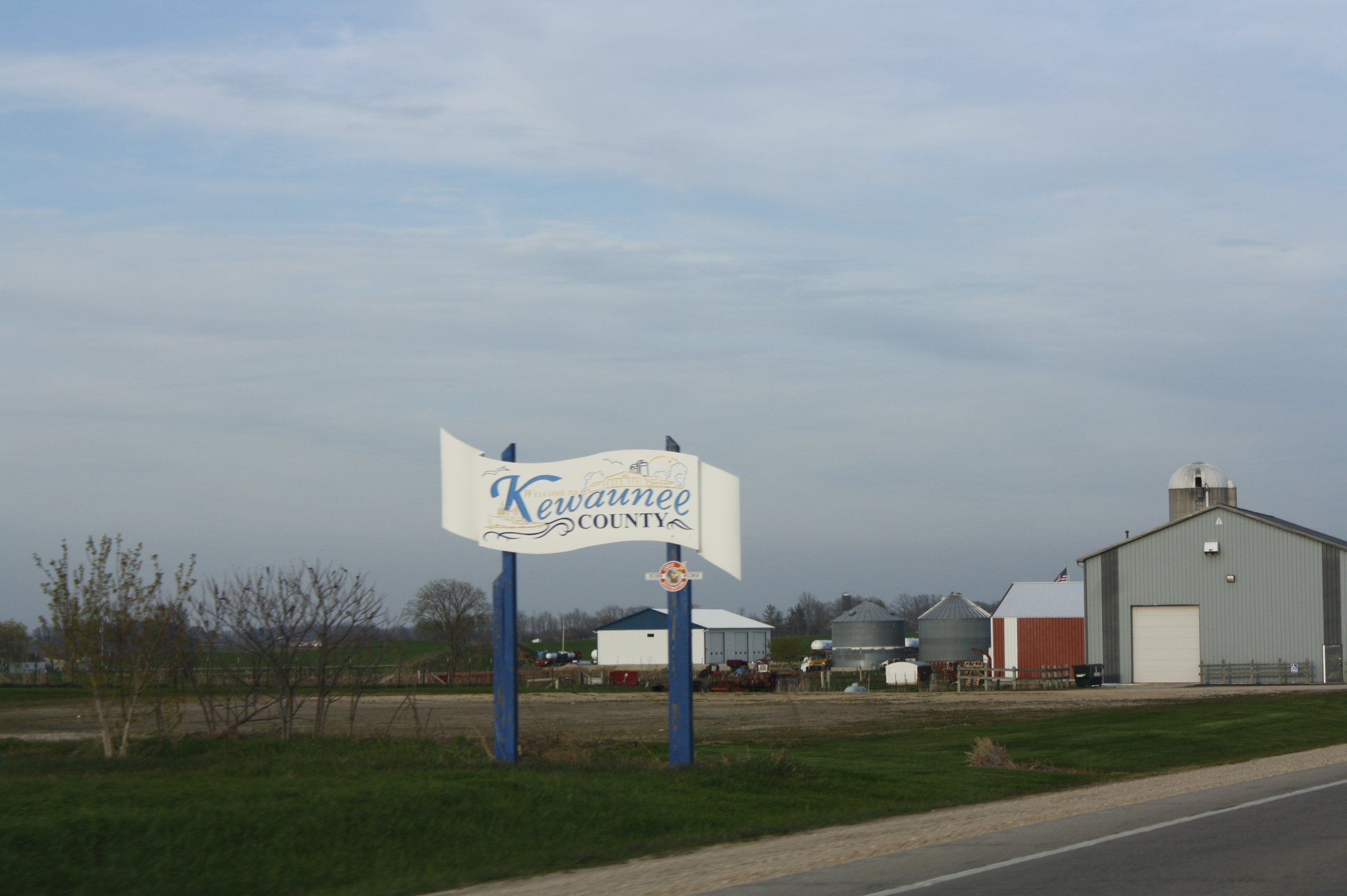
Welcome sign on WIS 54, farm in the background

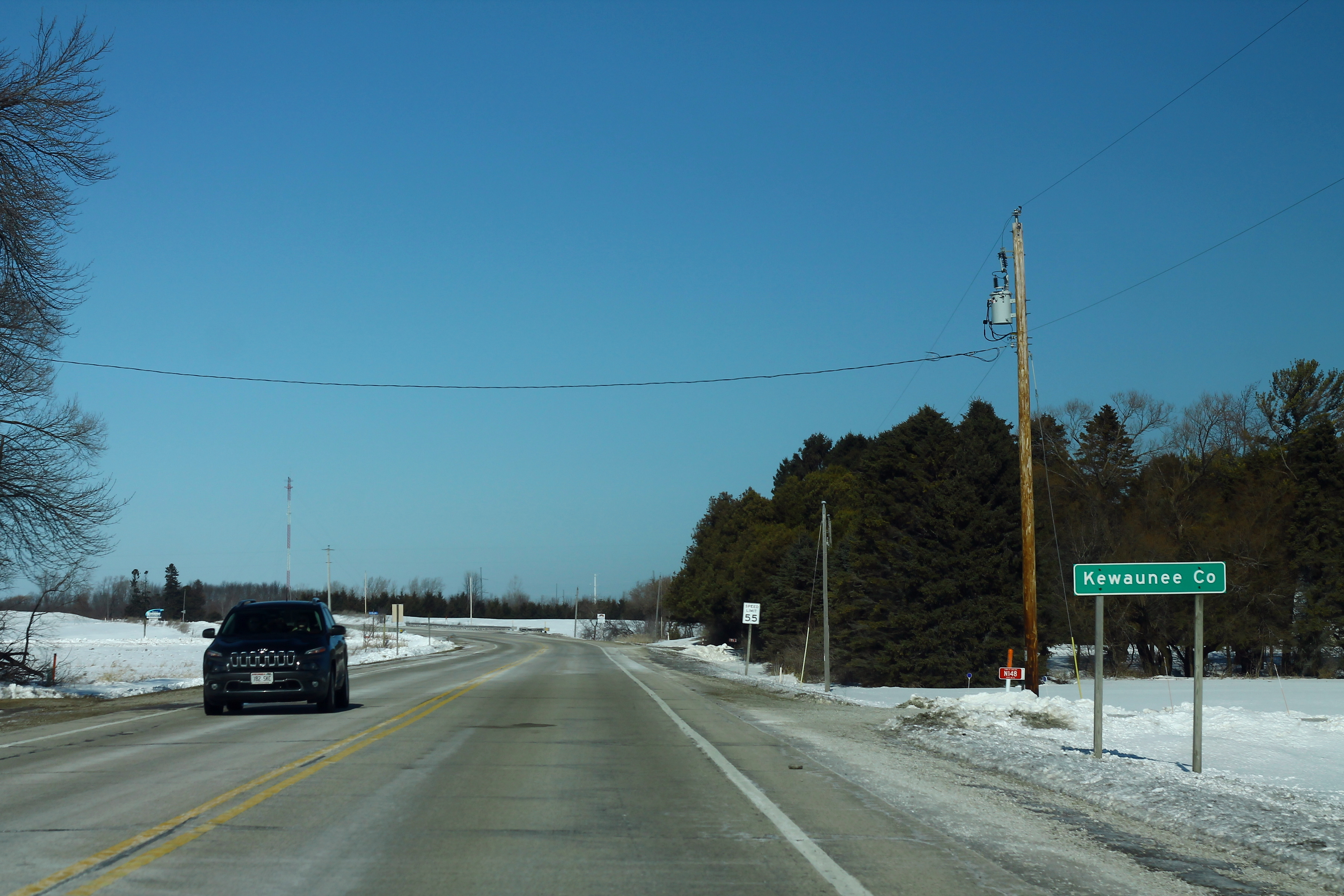
Kewaunee County sign on Highway 42, at the border with Manitowoc County

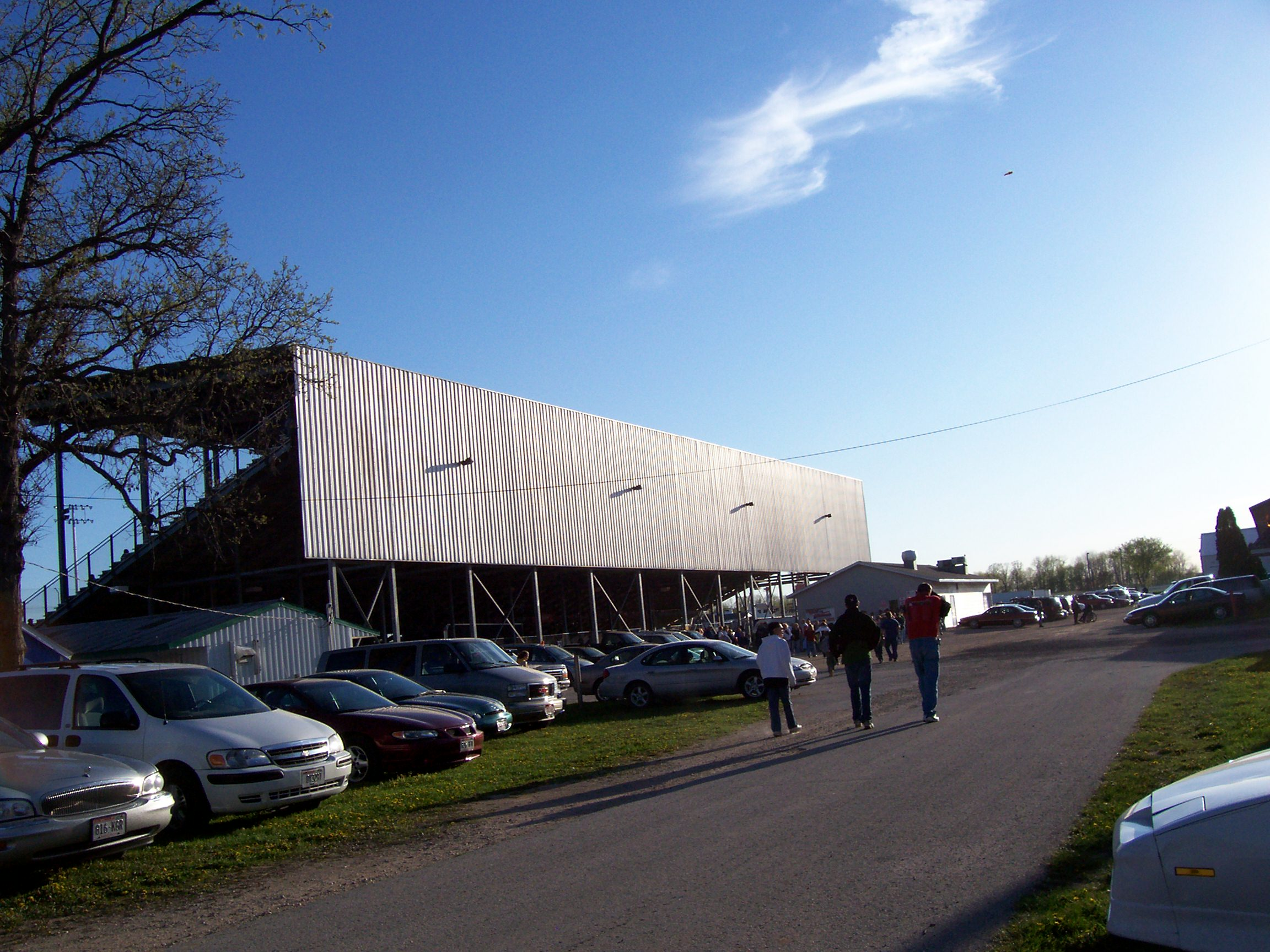
Kewaunee County fairgrounds

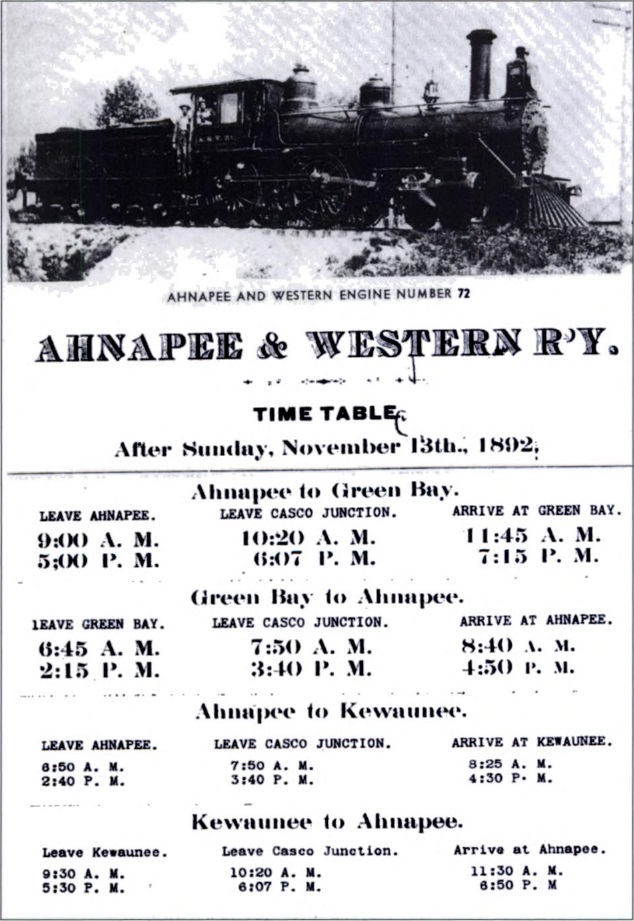
Ahnapee and Western Time Table, 1892

== Politics ==
United States presidential election results for Kewaunee County, Wisconsin
Year	Republican		Democratic		Third party(ies)	
Year	No.	%	No.	%	No.	%
1892	518	19.96%	2,046	78.84%	31	1.19%
1896	1,835	51.11%	1,649	45.93%	106	2.95%
1900	1,750	49.81%	1,729	49.22%	34	0.97%
1904	1,578	49.72%	1,457	45.90%	139	4.38%
1908	1,590	46.48%	1,731	50.60%	100	2.92%
1912	1,115	35.71%	1,696	54.32%	311	9.96%
1916	1,104	35.07%	2,011	63.88%	33	1.05%
1920	2,622	78.83%	598	17.98%	106	3.19%
1924	1,018	23.90%	395	9.27%	2,847	66.83%
1928	1,556	27.94%	3,988	71.61%	25	0.45%
1932	879	14.36%	5,200	84.94%	43	0.70%
1936	1,527	22.73%	4,971	74.01%	219	3.26%
1940	3,862	53.11%	3,389	46.60%	21	0.29%
1944	4,153	61.25%	2,611	38.51%	16	0.24%
1948	3,646	56.28%	2,746	42.39%	86	1.33%
1952	6,482	76.42%	1,972	23.25%	28	0.33%
1956	5,106	68.00%	2,364	31.48%	39	0.52%
1960	3,950	48.09%	4,256	51.82%	7	0.09%
1964	2,980	38.30%	4,792	61.59%	8	0.10%
1968	4,467	57.25%	2,622	33.61%	713	9.14%
1972	4,802	57.15%	3,360	39.99%	241	2.87%
1976	4,447	47.93%	4,607	49.65%	225	2.42%
1980	5,577	57.05%	3,706	37.91%	492	5.03%
1984	5,705	61.94%	3,444	37.39%	61	0.66%
1988	4,330	47.17%	4,786	52.14%	63	0.69%
1992	3,570	34.40%	4,050	39.03%	2,757	26.57%
1996	3,431	37.93%	4,311	47.66%	1,304	14.42%
2000	4,883	48.42%	4,670	46.31%	531	5.27%
2004	5,970	52.96%	5,175	45.91%	128	1.14%
2008	4,711	43.67%	5,902	54.71%	174	1.61%
2012	5,747	52.07%	5,153	46.69%	137	1.24%
2016	6,618	61.47%	3,627	33.69%	522	4.85%
2020	7,927	65.54%	3,976	32.87%	192	1.59%
2024	8,267	66.22%	4,059	32.51%	158	1.27%

From 1952 to 2008, Kewaunee County backed the nationwide winner in every election with the exception of 1988. The county began to shift away from its bellwether status in 2012, when Republican challenger Mitt Romney carried the county by 5.4% over incumbent Democrat Barack Obama in his successful re-election bid. Beginning in 2016, Kewaunee County has become a strongly Republican county, with Donald Trump becoming the first candidate to win over 60% of the county's vote since Ronald Reagan in his landslide re-election in 1984. Trump performed even better in the county in 2020, where he became the first candidate to crack 65% of Kewaunee County's vote since Dwight D. Eisenhower in his 1956 landslide re-election. Trump once again improved in 2024, taking more than 66% of the county's vote and receiving more than double the support of Kamala Harris in Kewaunee County.

== Notable people ==
For lists of notable people from Kewaunee County, see the following articles:

- Luxemburg § Notable people
- Algoma § Notable people
- Kewaunee § Notable people
- Ahnapee § Notable residents
- Carlton § Notable people
- Franklin § Notable people

== See also ==
- National Register of Historic Places listings in Kewaunee County, Wisconsin
