= Slovan, Wisconsin =

- Unincorporated community
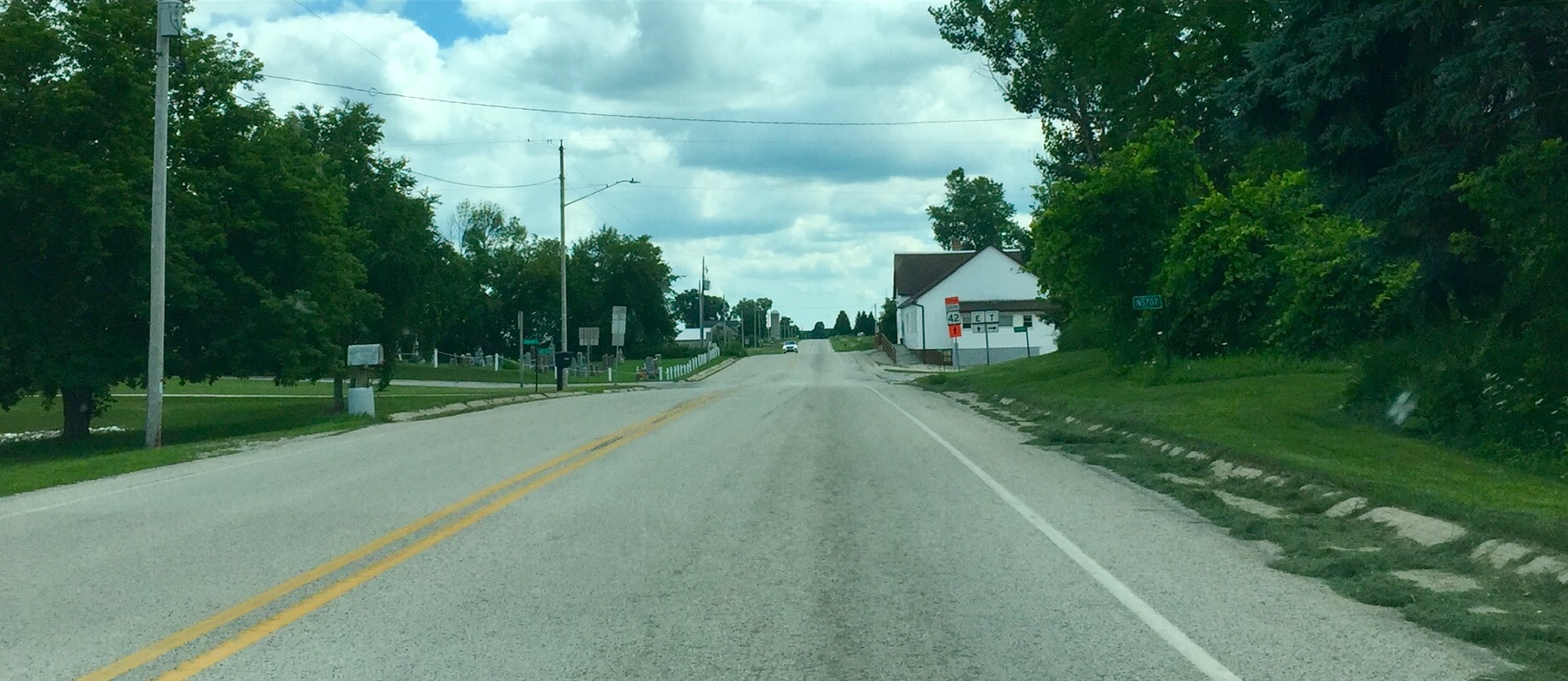
- Looking south at Slovan

- Location within Wisconsin Location within the United States
- Coordinates: 44°31′51″N 87°34′59″W
- Country: United States
- State: Wisconsin
- County: Kewaunee
- Town: Casco
- Elevation: 712 ft (217 m)
- Time zone: UTC-6 (Central (CST))
  - Summer (DST): UTC-5 (CDT)
- Area code: 920
- GNIS feature ID: 1574283

Slovan is an unincorporated community in the town of Casco, Kewaunee County, Wisconsin, United States. Slovan is 2.5 miles (4.0 km) southeast of the village of Casco. It is located at the interestion of County Trunk Highway T (CTH-T) and CTH-E.

== Gallery ==
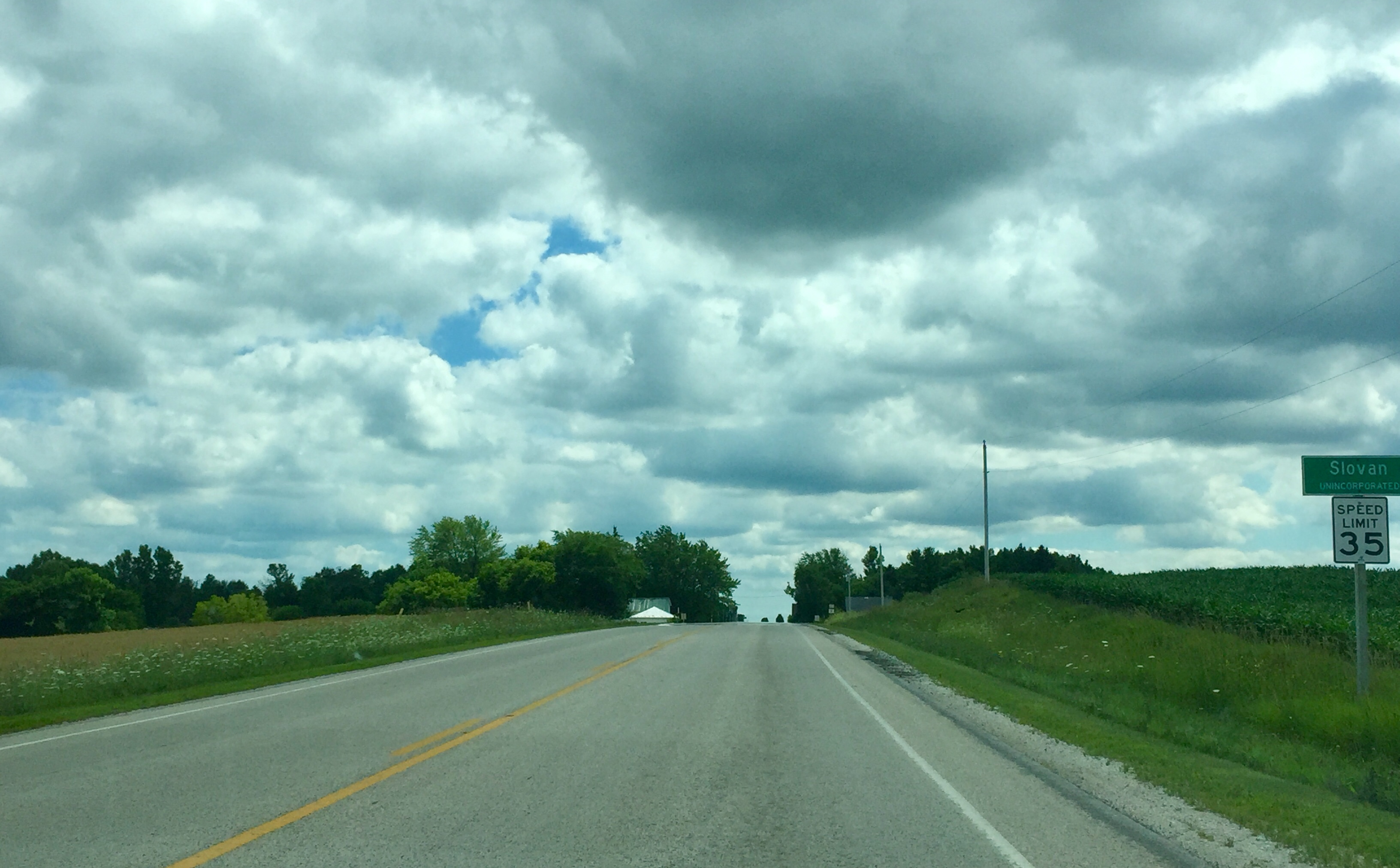
Looking south at the sign for Slovan on CTH-T

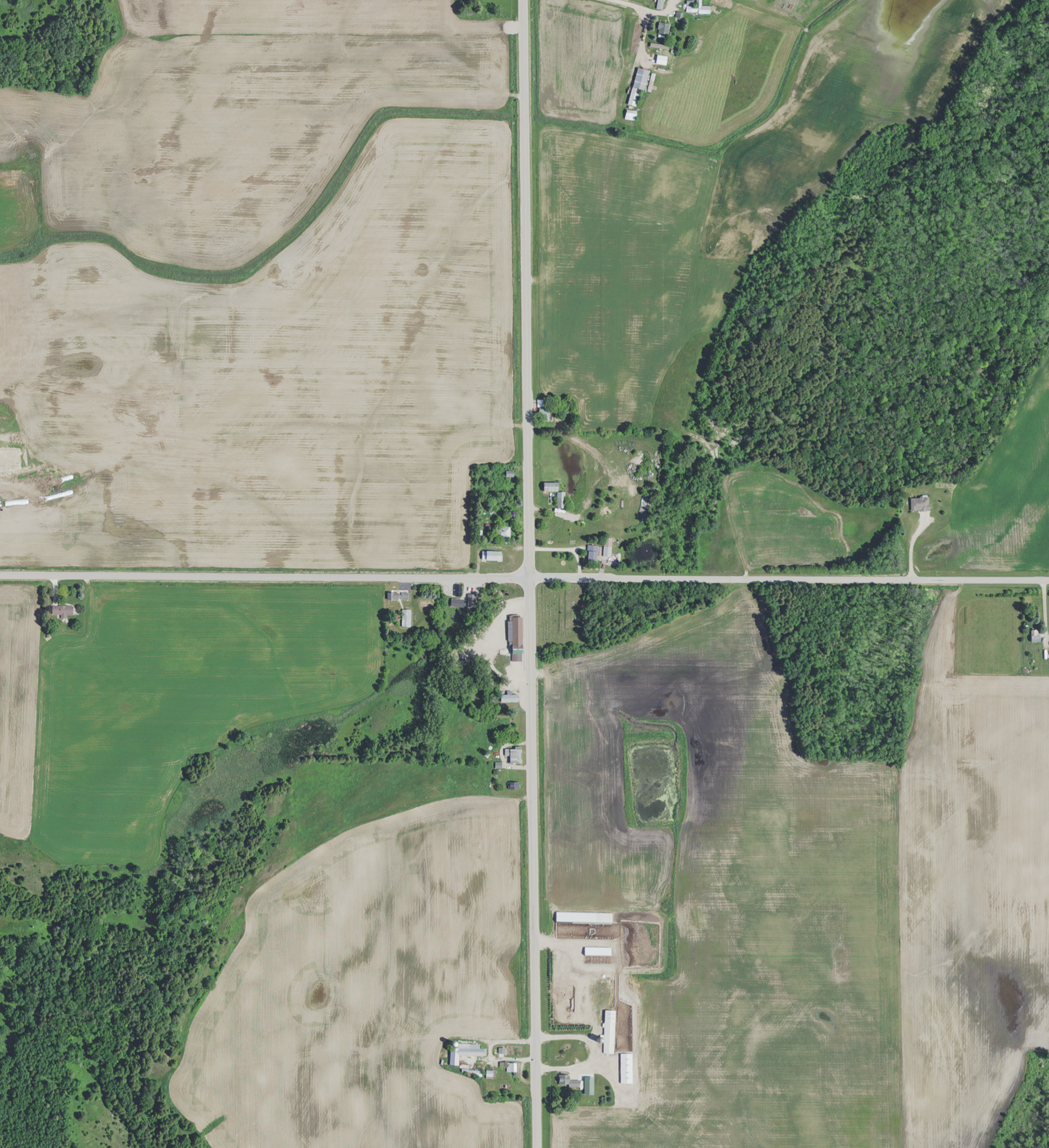
Taken August 7, 2020; CTH-T runs west from the center, while CTH-E runs north and south. Church Road runs east from the center.
