= Clyde, Kewaunee County, Wisconsin =

Clyde, Wisconsin
- Unincorporated community
- Location within Wisconsin Location within the United States
- Coordinates: 44°30′58″N 87°34′58″W
- Country: United States
- State: Wisconsin
- County: Kewaunee
- Town: Casco
- Elevation: 715 ft (218 m)
- Time zone: UTC-6 (Central (CST))
  - Summer (DST): UTC-5 (CDT)
- Area code: 920
- GNIS feature ID: 1577551

Clyde is an unincorporated community located in the town of Casco, Kewaunee County, Wisconsin, United States. It is on County Highway E near the Kewaunee River, 5.6 miles (9.0 km) northwest of Kewaunee.
