= Bruemmerville, Wisconsin =

- Unincorporated community
- Location within Wisconsin Location within the United States
- Coordinates: 44°36′24″N 87°28′12″W
- Country: United States
- State: Wisconsin
- County: Kewaunee
- Town: Ahnapee
- Elevation: 620 ft (190 m)
- Time zone: UTC-6 (Central (CST))
  - Summer (DST): UTC-5 (CDT)
- Area code: 920
- GNIS feature ID: 1562289

Bruemmerville is an unincorporated community in the town of Ahnapee, Kewaunee County, Wisconsin, United States. Bruemmerville is 1.8 miles (2.9 km) west of downtown Algoma. The community was named for Henry Bruemmer, who bought a grist mill on Silver Creek in 1866 and established a brick manufacturing plant.
