= Rio Creek, Wisconsin =

- Unincorporated community
- Location within Wisconsin Location within the United States
- Coordinates: 44°35′21″N 87°32′28″W
- Country: United States
- State: Wisconsin
- County: Kewaunee
- Towns: Casco, Lincoln
- Elevation: 686 ft (209 m)
- Time zone: UTC-6 (Central (CST))
  - Summer (DST): UTC-5 (CDT)
- Area code: 920
- GNIS feature ID: 1572331

Rio Creek (/ˈraɪoʊ/ RY-oh) is an unincorporated community located off Wisconsin Highway 54 in the towns of Casco and Lincoln, in Kewaunee County, Wisconsin, United States. The community is home to Rio Creek Airport (WI28), which holds an annual "fly in" with food, camping, and live music.
