= Kewaunee Marshland Walk =

Coordinates: 44.46648°N 87.50413°W

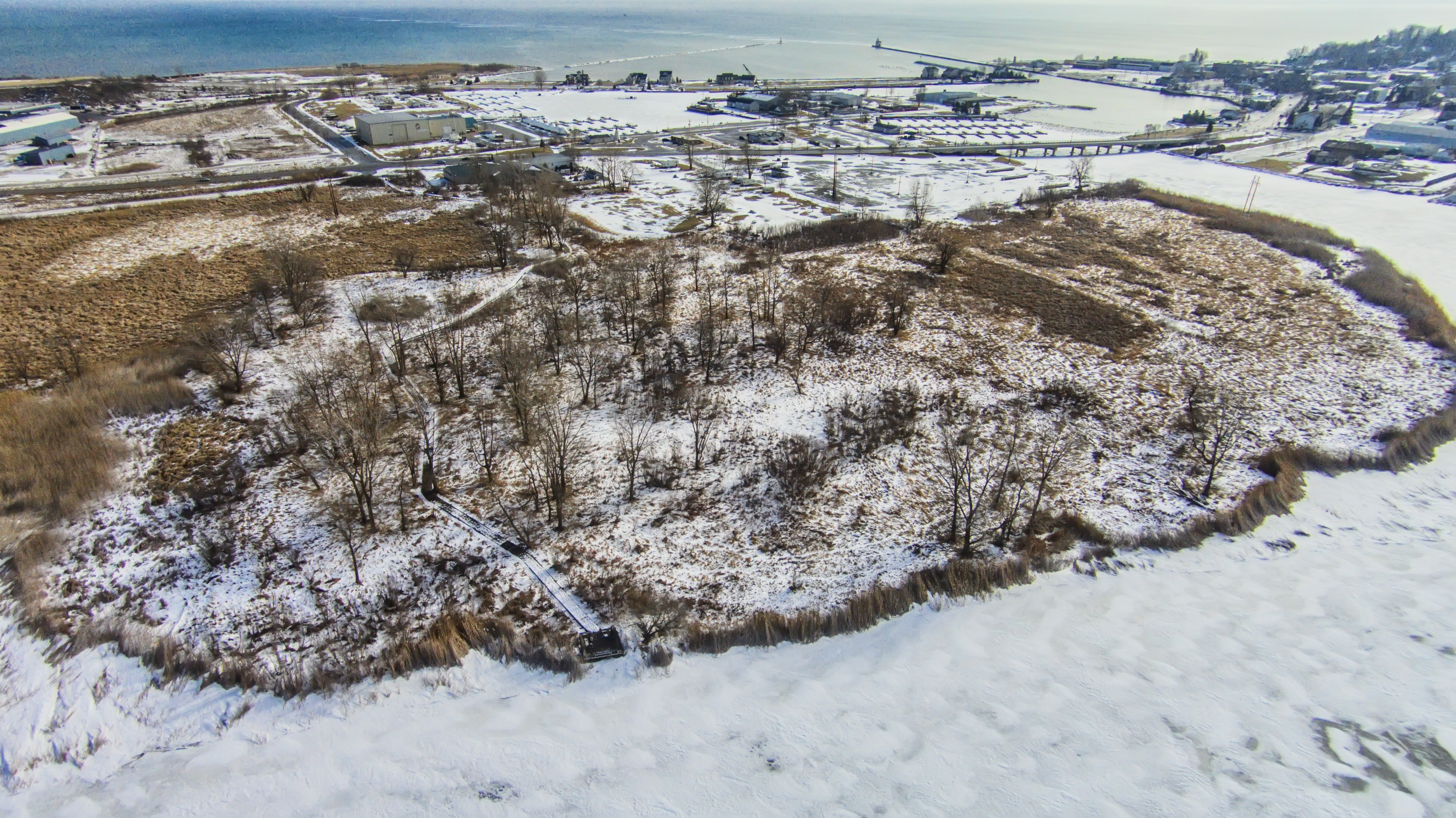
Kewaunee Marshland Walk

The Kewaunee Marshland Walk is a wooden boardwalk through the Kewaunee River marsh. The boardwalk is 980 feet long. It was built in 1993 as a cooperative effort between the City of Kewaunee and the Wisconsin Coastal Management Program.
