= Kewaunee County Bruemmer Park and Zoo =

Zoo in Wisconsin

- Bruemmer Park
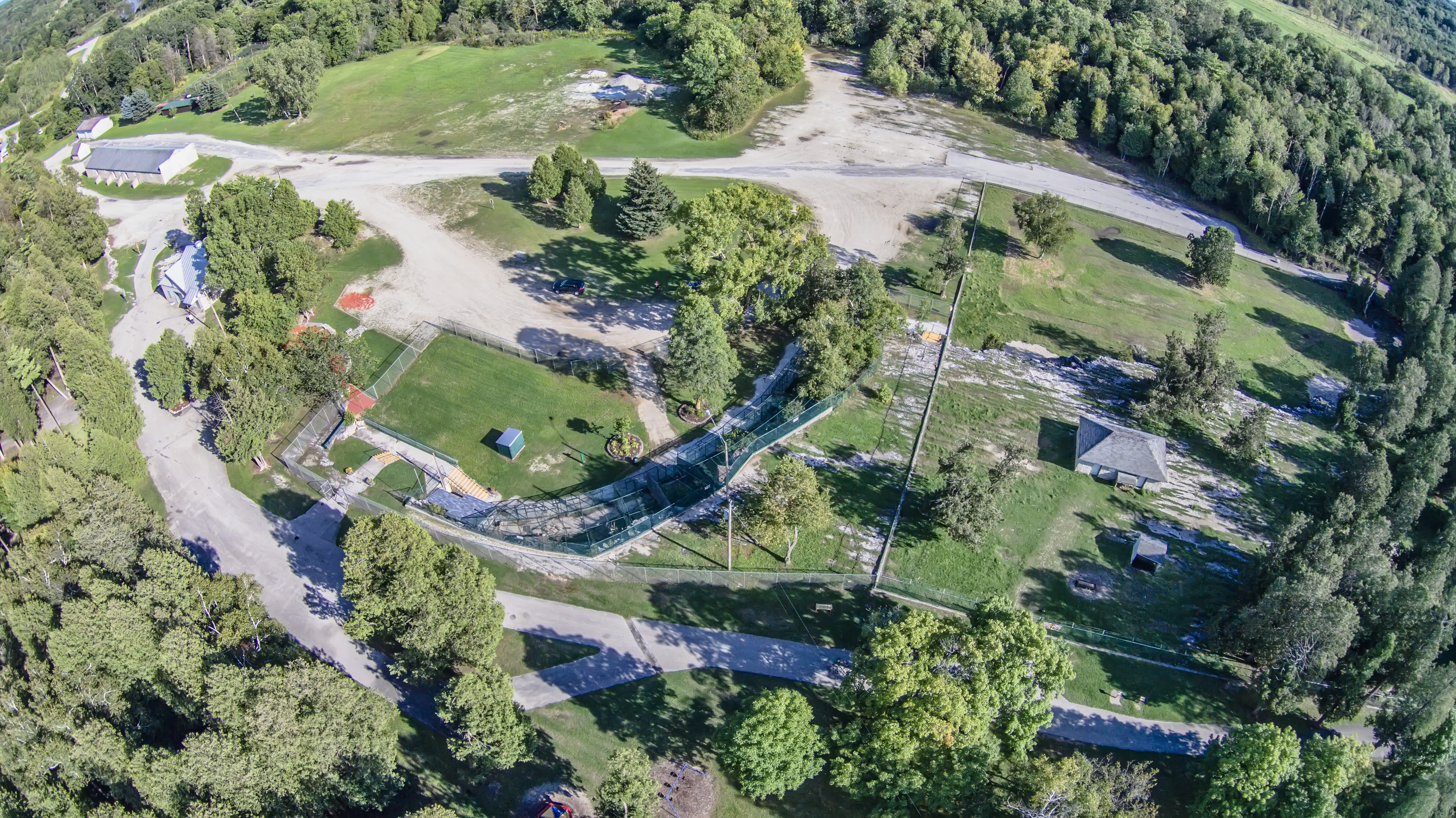
- Aerial image of the zoo area.

- Location within Wisconsin
- Location: Kewaunee County, Wisconsin
- Nearest city: Kewaunee, Wisconsin
- Coordinates: 44°27′38″N 87°33′04″W
- Elevation: 185 meters above sea level

Kewaunee County Bruemmer Park and Zoo is a park located west of Kewaunee, Wisconsin. The park features a small zoo for several North American and at least three exotic animals. The park has wooded trails and borders the Kewaunee River. The park is located on the Niagara Escarpment and is built on bedrock and is home to limestone kiln remnants from early limestone production.

== Species List at the Zoo ==
- White-tailed Deer
- Bobcat
- Domestic Goat
- Arctic Fox
- Indian Peafowl
- Domestic Goose
- Silver Pheasant
- Ring-necked Pheasant
- Golden Pheasant
- Lady Amherst's Pheasant
- Reeves's Pheasant
- Temminck's Tragopan

== Future Developments ==
The zoo plans on adding a new education center. Potential species include grey wolves, American black bears, and prairie dogs.
