= Ahnapee State Trail =

Multi-use trail in Wisconsin, Unirted States

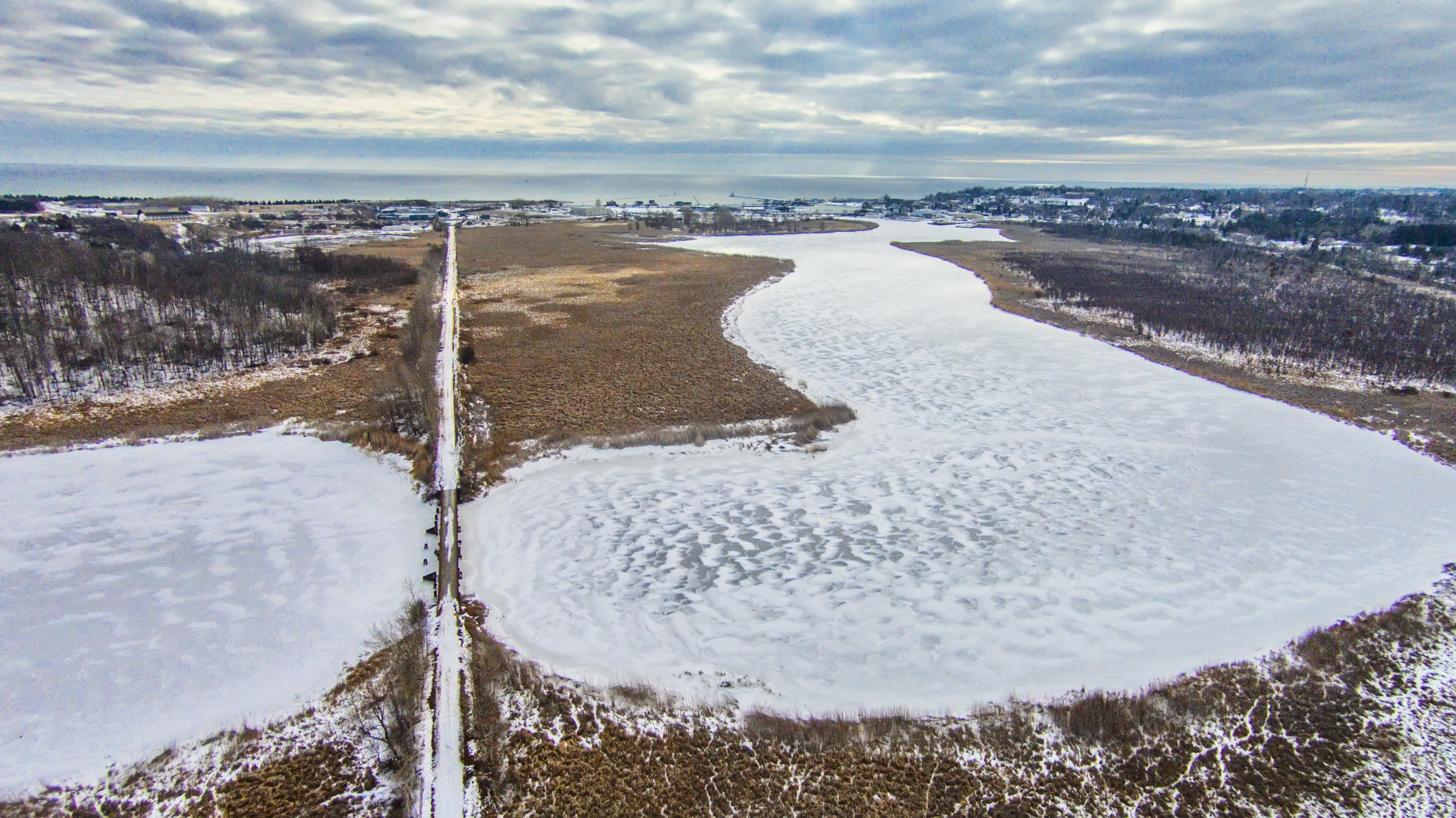
- Ahnapee State trail bridge over the frozen Kewaunee River
- Length: 48 miles
- Established: 1974
- Use: Hiking, Biking, Horseback Riding, Snowmobiling
- Website: Ahnapee State Trail, Wisconsin Department of Natural Resources

The Ahnapee State Trail (also known as the Ahnapee Trail) is a multi-use trail along the Ahnapee River and the Kewaunee River in northeastern Wisconsin.

== Route ==
Beginning in downtown Sturgeon Bay, the trail winds south along the Ahnapee and Kewaunee rivers to Algoma, Casco, Luxemburg, and Kewaunee. Near Casco, the trail branches off in three directions, west to Luxemburg, northeast towards Algoma and southeast towards the city of Kewaunee.

The Ice Age Trail follows two sections of the Ahnapee State Trail corridor, for about 17 miles from downtown Sturgeon Bay in Door County to Algoma and for another 10 miles from the city of Kewaunee through the C.D. Besadny Fish and Wildlife Area in Kewaunee County.

== Access ==
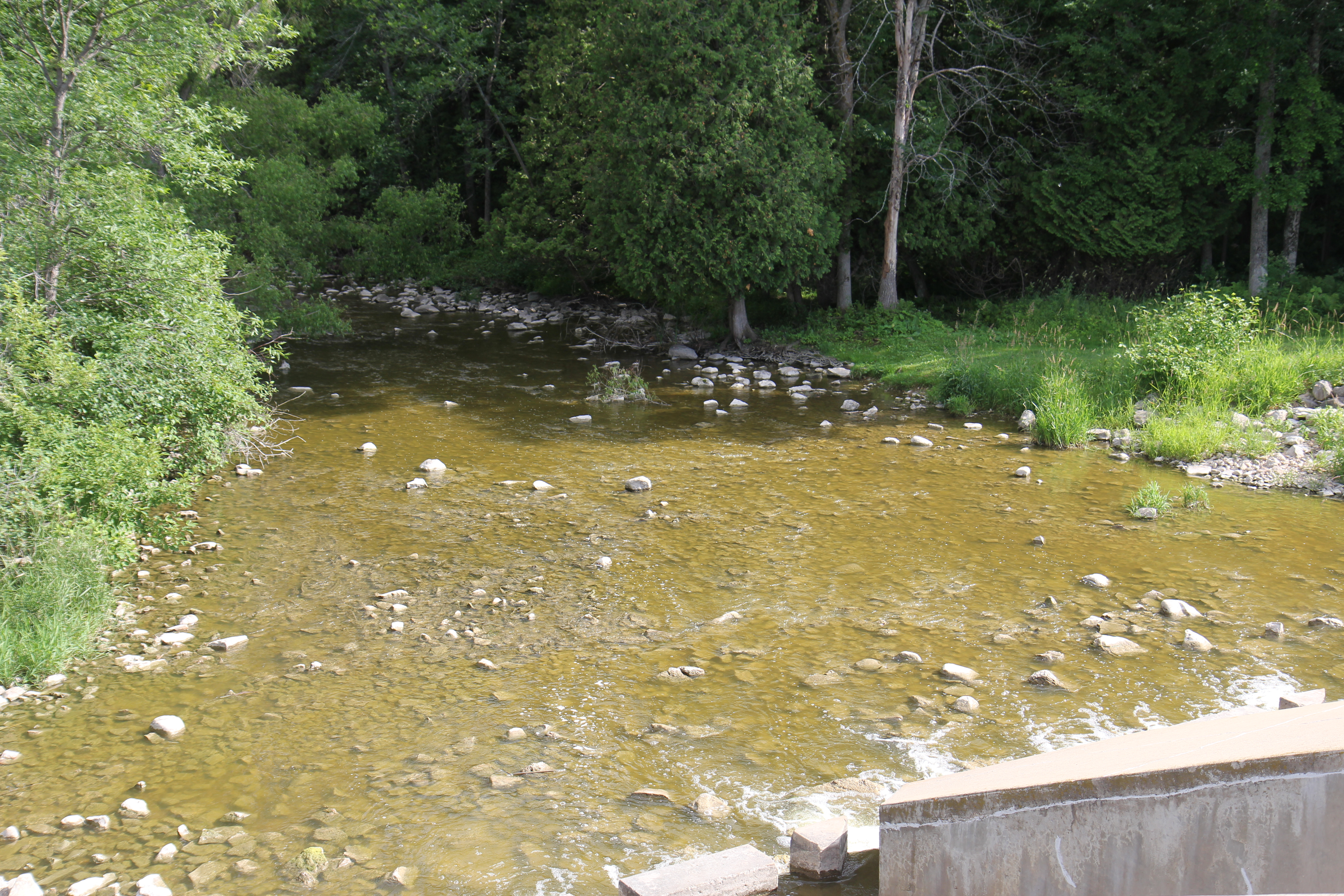
The Ahnapee River below the dam at Forestville

The trail is open to bicyclists, walkers, joggers, horseback riders, and pets on leashes. In the winter the trail is open to cross-country skiing, snowshoeing, and snowmobiling. The grade of the trail is entirely level, which although suitable is not the most ideal for cross-country skiing.

Although the trail is open all 24 hours, the public park toilets located along the trail at the Forestville Dam, the wayside in Maplewood, and S Neenah Ave. in Sturgeon Bay are only open a half hour before sunrise to 11 PM.

In 2019, the trail was found to be the fourth most frequently visited county park in Door County in a voluntary response survey conducted by the county.

== History ==
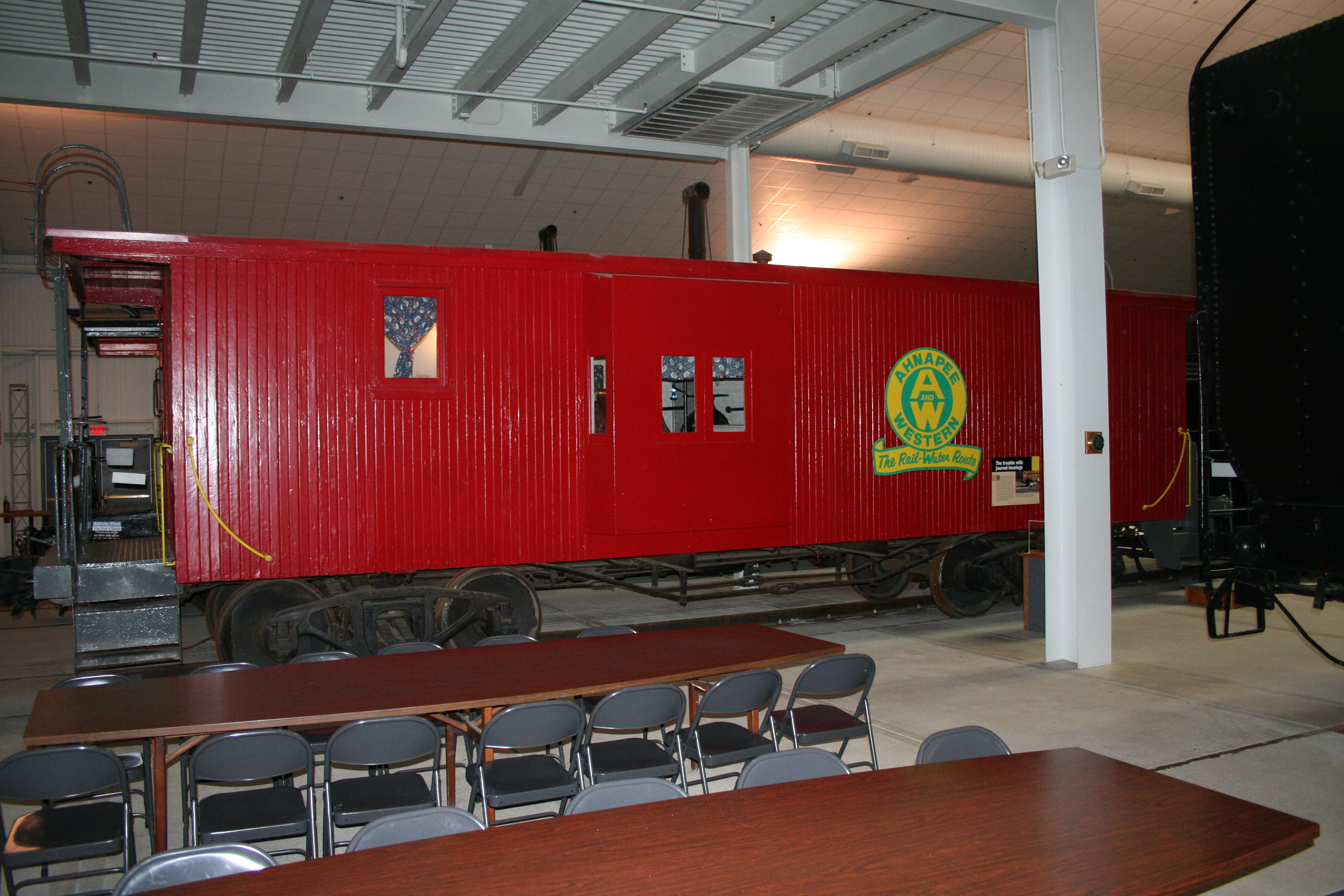
Ahnapee and Western caboose, on display at the National Railroad Museum in Green Bay.

The Ahnapee and Western Railway right of way was purchased by the state in 1970 at a cost of $25,000 for 200 acres of land. The Ahnapee State Trail was constructed over the rail bed, traveling from the railway's original connection with the former Green Bay and Western Railroad tracks at Casco Junction to Sturgeon Bay. Many artifacts of the Ahnapee and Western Railway's history remain along the trail including steam locomotive boiler culverts, dated concrete bridges, several steel girder bridges, and many of the buildings that once housed rail-related industries.

== Location ==
- Northern terminus on S. Neenah Av. just south of Sturgeon Bay (44°48′04″N 87°22′55″W).
- Algoma trailhead on 6th St. in Algoma (44°36′42″N 87°26′28″W).
- Three-way intersection along Sunset Rd. southeast of Casco, including parking (44°31′50″N 87°39′01″W).
- Western terminus on County Highway AB in Luxemburg (44°32′18″N 87°42′13″W).
- Southeastern terminus (north) north of Kewaunee along WIS 42 (44°28′08″N 87°30′03″W).
- Southeastern terminus (south) near downtown Kewaunee on Beardsly St. just north of County Highway E (44°27′42″N 87°30′27″W).
