= Casco Junction, Wisconsin =

- Unincorporated community
- Location within Wisconsin Location within the United States
- Coordinates: 44°31′50″N 87°39′02″W
- Country: United States
- State: Wisconsin
- County: Kewaunee
- Town: Luxemburg
- Elevation: 720 ft (220 m)
- Time zone: UTC-6 (Central (CST))
  - Summer (DST): UTC-5 (CDT)
- Area code: 920
- GNIS feature ID: 1577538

Casco Junction is an unincorporated community located in the town of Luxemburg in Kewaunee County, Wisconsin, United States. The community was an important railroad outpost for the Ahnapee and Western Railway for which Casco Junction acted as the southern terminus of the railroad. Today the now defunct railroad's track has been converted to a walking trail that connects the village of Luxemburg to Algoma and Sturgeon Bay via the Ahnapee State Trail.
