= Ahnapee River =

River in Wisconsin, United States

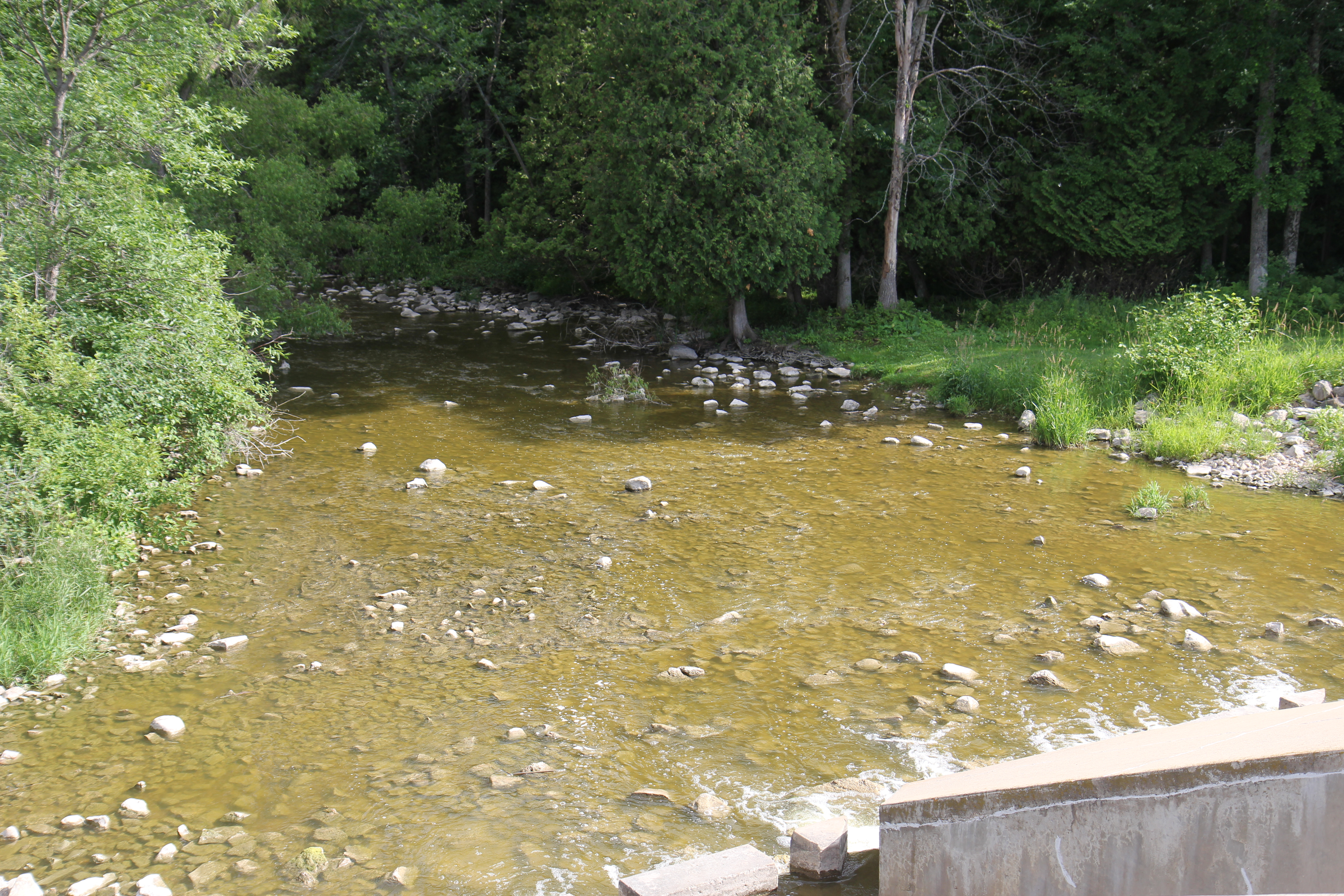
- The Ahnapee River below the dam at Forestville
- Native name: Aanapii (Ojibwe)

Location
- Country: United States
- State: Wisconsin
- Region: Door Peninsula

Physical characteristics
- Source: Gardner Swamp
  - location: Wisconsin
  - coordinates: 44°46′08″N 87°32′21″W
- Mouth: Lake Michigan
  - location: Algoma, Wisconsin
  - coordinates: 44°36′30″N 87°25′59″W
- Length: 15 mi (24 km)

Basin features
- Tributaries
  - left: Silver Creek

The Ahnapee River is a 14.7-mile-long (23.7 km) river on the Door Peninsula in eastern Wisconsin in the United States. It rises in Door County, Wisconsin, and flows through Kewaunee County into Lake Michigan at the city of Algoma. Its name has been ascribed as coming from the Ojibwe word aanapii meaning "when?".

== Course ==
The Ahnapee rises in southern Door County and flows generally southeastwardly into northeastern Kewaunee County, past the village of Forestville, where it is dammed. Downstream of Forestville the river becomes a freshwater estuary of Lake Michigan and is paralleled by a rail trail called the Ahnapee State Trail. It joins Lake Michigan at the city of Algoma. The length of the river from Forestville to Algoma has ten public access points.

== Gallery ==
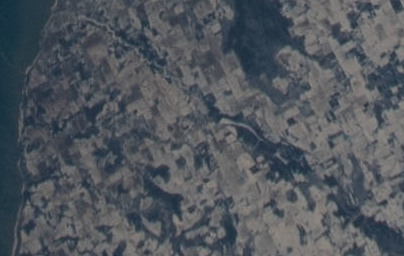
The Ahnapee River on February 7, 2022, taken from the International Space Station. The source of the river (lower right) is at the southeast of Gardner Swamp. The millpond at Forestville (center) appears as a long white spot. The river flows southwest towards its mouth at Algoma (upper left).

The source of the upper portion of the Ahnapee River upstream from where it crosses Wisconsin Highway 57, taken June 27, 2020

The upper part of the Forestville Millpond, with the upper portion of the Ahnapee River flowing into it; taken June 27, 2020

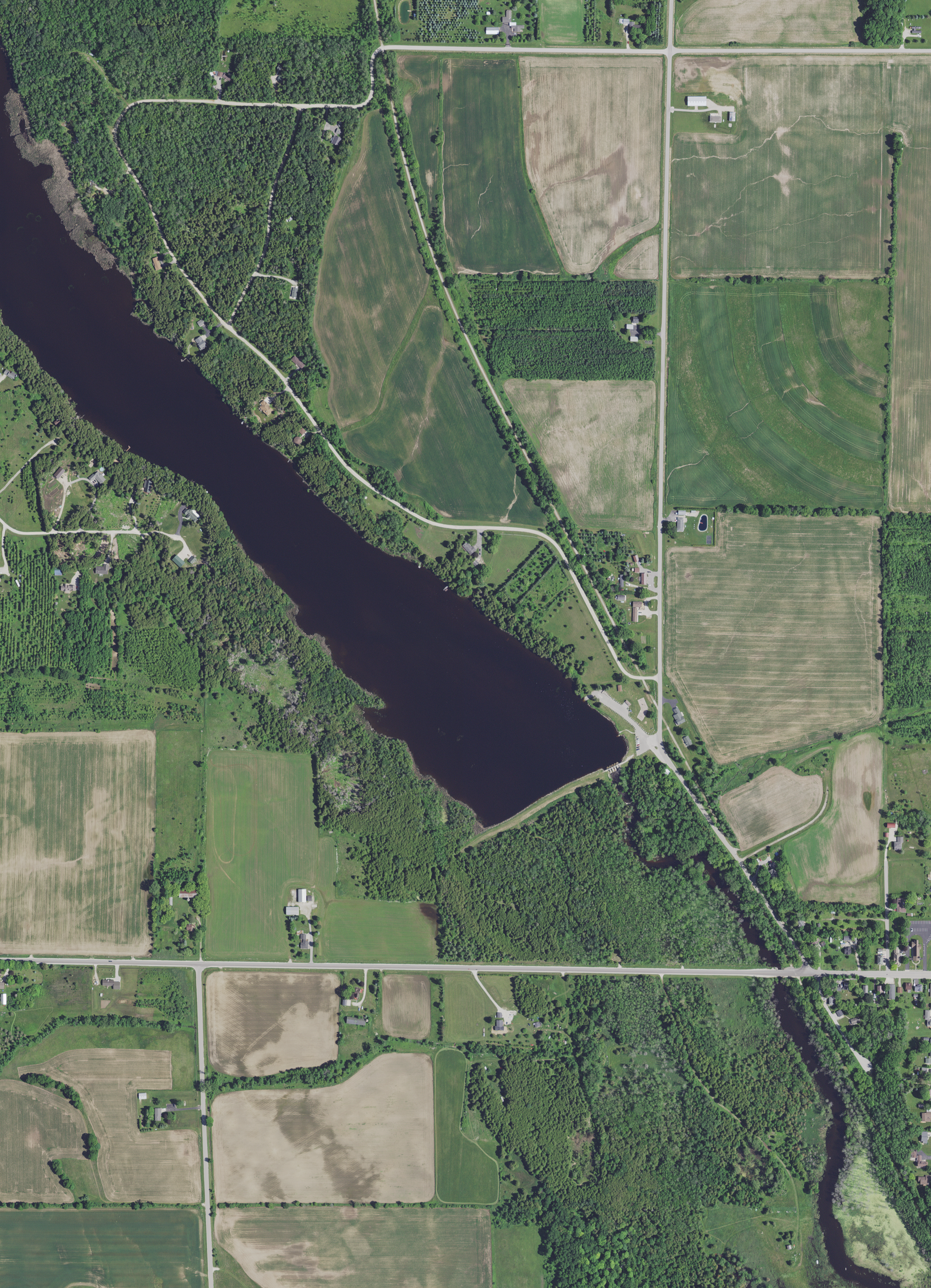
The lower part of the Forestville Millpond and the start of the lower portion of the Ahnapee River; taken June 27, 2020

The Ahnapee on June 27, 2020 as it crosses the Door–Kewaunee county line.

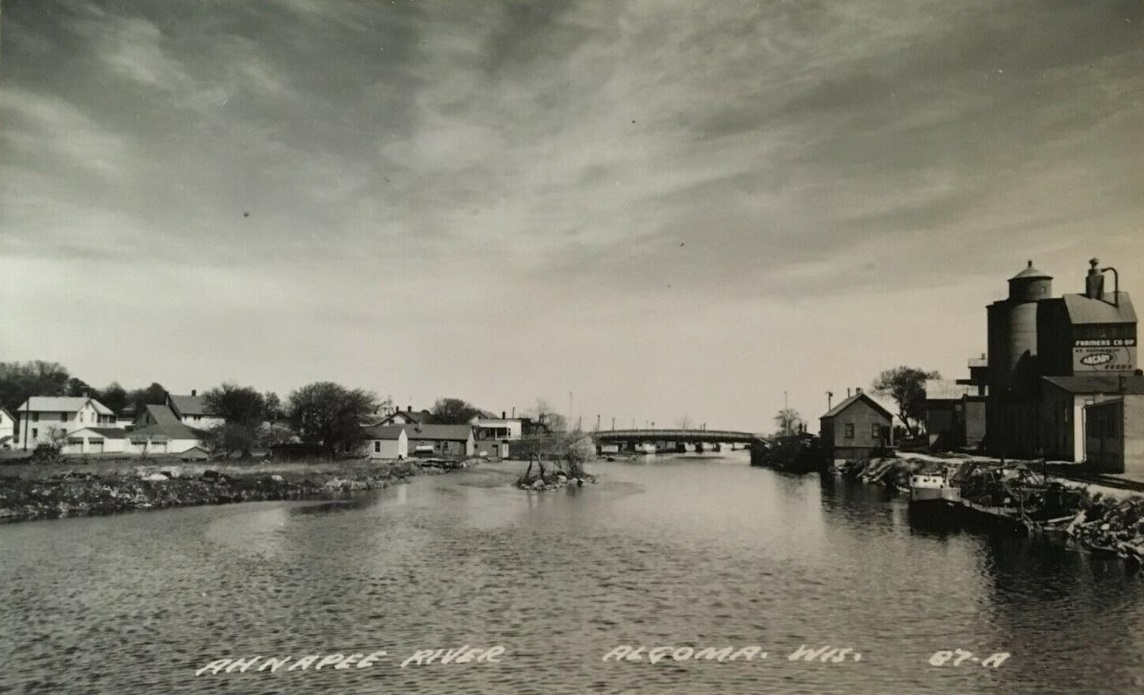
The river in Algoma, from a postcard postmarked in 1960

== See also ==
- List of Wisconsin rivers
