= Beach advisory =

Warning given by a local government to avoid swimming in a body of water

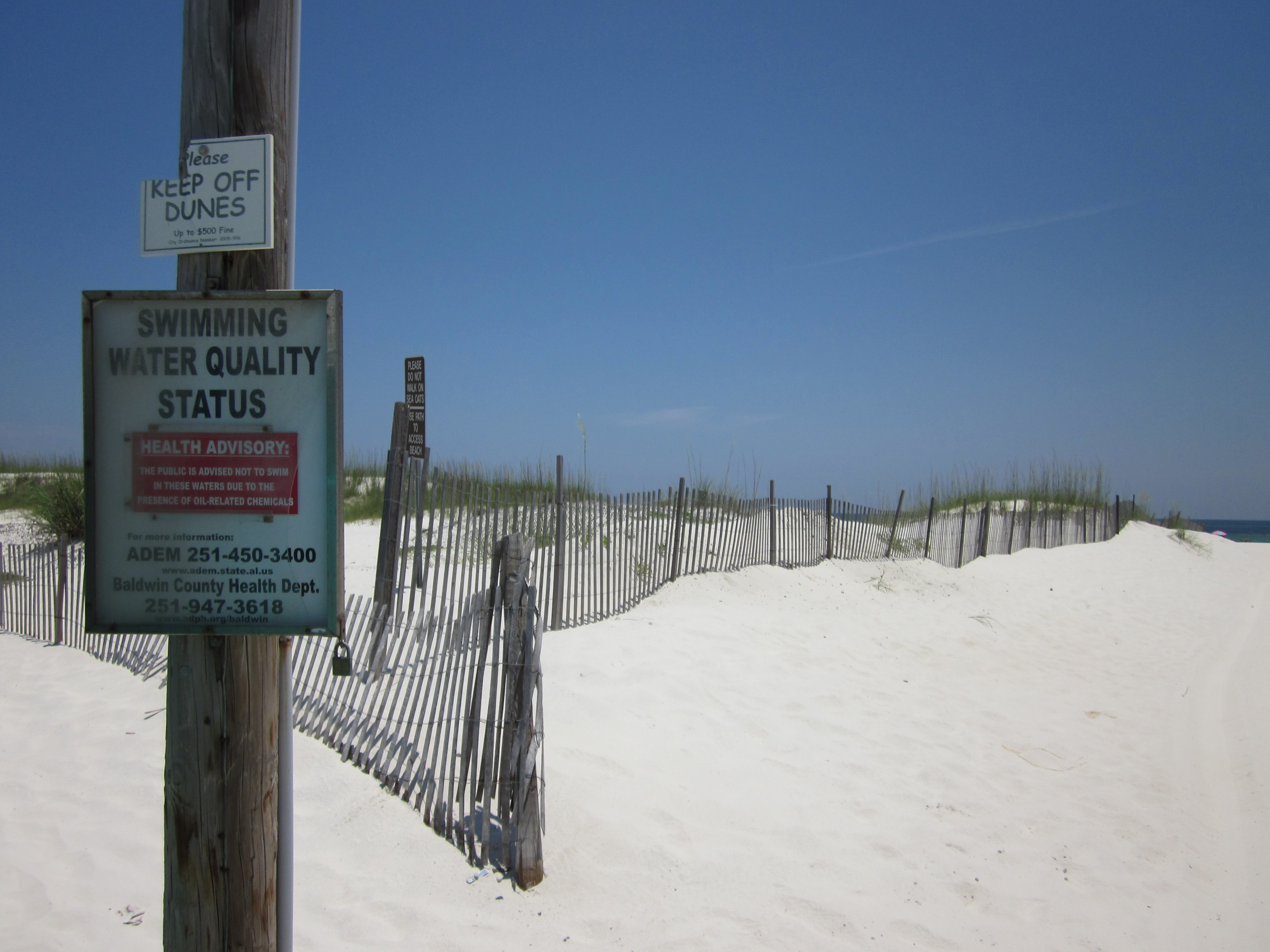
Beach Advisory Warning Sign in Orange Beach, Alabama

A beach advisory is a warning given by a local government to avoid swimming in a body of water. Beach advisories do not automatically close bodies of water to swimmers but instead function as a warning to swimmers against swimming at a particular site.

Beach advisories are issued after unsafe levels of Enterococcus are detected at sample sites along a body of water, often resulting from high levels of fecal matter in the water. One source of waste pollution and subsequent increase in enteroccus concentration may come from migrating birds. Enterococcus bacteria is not harmful by itself, but it indicates harmful bacteria is in the water. These types of bacteria can cause gastrointestinal illnesses, resulting in vomiting and diarrhea. They may also cause upper respiratory illness as well as skin infections at an open wound.

Beach advisories are also issued after chemical spills. Beach advisories are often issued after rain advisories because high amounts of rain can cause contaminated streamflow from flooding to enter a body of water and contaminate the swimming area.

== Reasons for Beach Advisories ==
=== Enterococcus ===
Enterococcus is a large genus of lactic acid phylum Firmicutes (Note: Firmicutes are a phylum of bacteria, in which most have Gram-positive cell wall structure. Many firmicutes are resistant to desiccation and are able to survive extreme conditions.) Fecal enterococci inhabit gastrointestinal tract of animals. Therefore, having abnormally high indicators of fecal enterococcus in bodies of water correlates directly to fecal contamination (Domingo et al., 2003). Domingo also suggests that using the TaqMan-based approach (Note: Taq-man is a chemistry formulation that is used to test the presence of certain bacteria, including enterococcus in large bodies of water.) can detect Enterococcus in environmental waters. This method may be performed in the span of a few hours, making it an efficient system that local governments may rely on, while issuing a beach advisory. Another method to detect large numbers of enterococcus in water is an agar-based growth media incubated under standard aerobic conditions. While conducting various tests involving selective as well as non-selective methods, cultures of enterococcus are isolated in brass and earthen vessels for up to 48 hours (Chhibber et al., 2007). Enterococcus may cause an array of illnesses, varying from cellulitis, prostatitis, diverticulitis, urinary tract infections (UTI), endocarditis as well intra-abdominal infections (Bush, 2013).

=== Escherichia coli (E. coli) ===
Escherichia coli, or E. coli is a bacterium that can be found in many warm-blooded animals, which includes, humans, livestock, wildlife and birds (government of Manitoba). Escherichia coli does not usually cause illness by itself, but when it contaminates large numbers, the level of illness raises. E. coli is expelled into the environment via fecal matter. According to the Public Health Agency of Canada (2015), drinking contaminated water or drinking contaminated food may contract E. coli infections. E. coli may also be spread from one person to another. Symptoms may include nausea, diarrhea, vomiting and severe stomach cramps. Symptoms may appear anywhere from 3 to 10 days after ingestion of the bacteria.

There has been a study in Manitoba concerning the elevated E. coli numbers in Lake Winnipeg. The Interim Report of the Manitoba Water Stewardship, 2009 explains reasons for elevated Escherichia coli in Lake Winnipeg Beaches (Williamson et al., 2009). The Interim Report shows the correlation of high counts of Escherichia coli in the Lake with large discharge of sewage from the City of Winnipeg, run-offs from livestock operations into Lake Winnipeg. The lake had issued countless amounts of beach advisories to the public once it was noticed that irregular amounts of E. coli was found in the water. Studies had proved that the high number of E. coli in bathing water was partially due to wind-induced water level changes and that the majority of it originated from animal sources as opposed to human activity.

== Illnesses ==
=== Swimmer's itch ===
Swimmer's itch is a skin condition that occurs to people who partake in open-water activities. Swimmer's itch may happen in any body of water in the world and is not exclusive to one specific region. The condition involves the cercarial dermatitis to penetrate the skin, while dying in the epidermis, causing the itching sensation (Blankespoor et al., 2004). Beach advisories may be put in place if there is an outbreak of swimmer's itch, but its importance in the public health sector is still unknown. Outbreaks and reoccurring beach advisories may influence vacationers to travel elsewhere although its severity is still in question.

=== Cellulitis ===
The Mayo Clinic defines cellulitis as a common but potentially serious bacterial skin infection (2015). Symptoms of cellulitis include skin swelling, tenderness, redness and skin feeling hot. Cellulitis does not usually spread from person to person, but may enter the body by cracks or breaks in the skin. Cellulitis usually appears on the lower parts of the legs but may spread anywhere on the body. Cellulitis begins by affecting merely the surface of the skin, but may migrate to the tissues, affecting lymph nodes and eventually the bloodstream. If left untreated, the spreading infection may become life-threatening. It is crucial that one seeks medical treatment if the previously mentioned symptoms occur.

=== Prostatitis ===
Enterococcus may also cause prostatitis. Prostatitis is the swelling and inflammation of the prostate gland that is located below men's bladders. Prostatitis can cause painful or difficult urination. Other symptoms may also include pain in the groin, pelvic area and flu-like symptoms. It is important to seek medical attention immediately once experiencing one or more of the symptoms. Prostatitis may be treated by taking antibiotics, but left untreated may cause medical complications concerning the prostate.

=== Diverticulitis ===
Diverticula are small pouches that form in the lining of the digestive system, generally in the lower part of the large intestine. Although there are a small number of implications, there may be swelling of one or more of the pouches. This may lead to infections and can cause extreme abdominal pain, fever, nausea and irregular bowel movements (Mayo Clinic, 2015). Simply resting and taking antibiotics can treat diverticulitis, although serious cases may require surgery.

=== Urinary Tract Infection (UTI) ===
A Urinary Tract Infection is an infection that involves any part of the urinary system, being the kidneys, urethra, bladder, or ureters. Although women are more susceptible to getting UTI's, men may also develop them. The infection causes pain while urinating, the urge to urinate often, and pelvic pain. UTIs may be caused by Escherichia coli, which as mentioned above, may be found in bodies of water at the time of beach advisories. Generally, UTIs can be treated with antibiotics that are prescribed by a doctor.
