= Casco (town), Wisconsin =

Town in Wisconsin, United States

Casco, Wisconsin
- Town
- Town of Casco
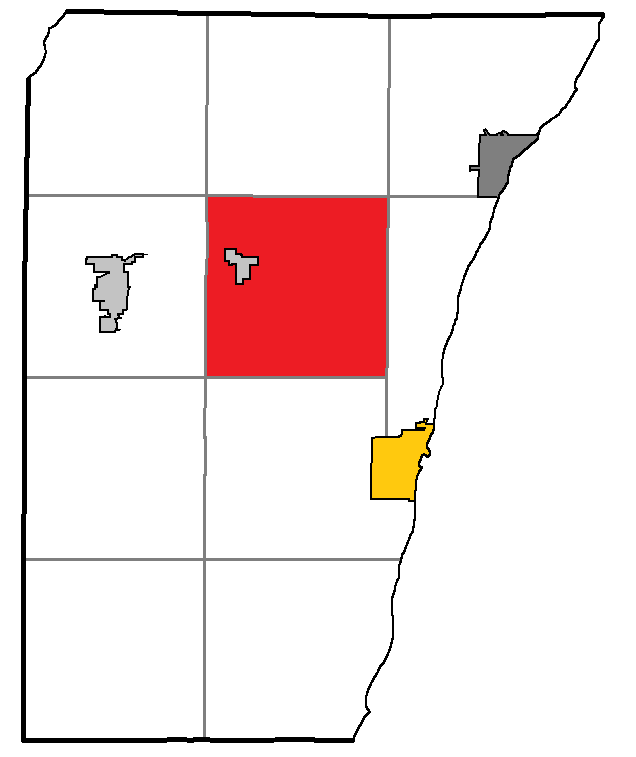
- Location of Casco, within Kewaunee County
- Coordinates: 44°32′52″N 87°35′04″W
- Country: United States
- State: Wisconsin
- County: Kewaunee

Area
  - Total: 35.62 sq mi (92.3 km^{2})
  - Land: 35.61 sq mi (92.2 km^{2})
  - Water: 0.01 sq mi (0.026 km^{2})

Population (2020)
  - Total: 1,150
  - Density: 32.3/sq mi (12.5/km^{2})
- Time zone: UTC-6 (Central (CST))
  - Summer (DST): UTC-5 (CDT)
- Area code(s): 920 & 274
- GNIS feature ID: 1582922

Casco is a town in Kewaunee County, Wisconsin, United States. During the 2020 census, the population recorded was 1,150. The village of Casco, a separate municipality, is in the northwestern part of the town, and the unincorporated communities of Clyde, Ryans Corner, Slovan, and Rio Creek are located in the town as well.

== Geography ==
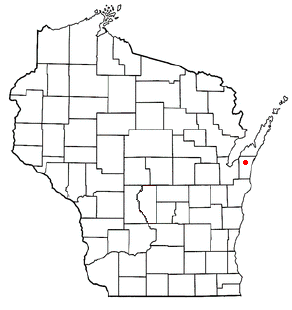
Location of Casco, Wisconsin

According to the United States Census Bureau, the town has a total area of 35.6 square miles (92.2 km^{2}); the area is predominantly land.

== Demographics ==
As of the census conducted in 2000, there were 1,153 people, 385 households, and 329 families residing in the town. The population density was 32.3 people per square mile (12.5/km^{2}). There were 404 housing units at an average density of 11.3 per square mile (4.4/km^{2}). The racial makeup of the town was 98.27% White, 0.26% Native American, 0.09% Asian, and 1.39% from two or more races. 1.04% of the population were Hispanic or Latino of any race.

There were 385 households, out of which 37.9% had children under the age of 18 living with them, 73.5% were married couples living together, 6.8% had a female householder with no husband present, and 14.5% were non-families. 12.5% of all households were made up of individuals, and 5.2% had someone living alone who was 65 years of age or older. The average household size was 2.98 and the average family size was 3.19.

In the town, the population was spread out, with 28.4% under the age of 18, 8.8% from 18 to 24, 27.3% from 25 to 44, 23.9% from 45 to 64, and 11.4% who were 65 years of age or older. The median age was 36 years. For every 100 females, there were 104.4 males. For every 100 females age 18 and over, there were 105.2 males.

The median income for a household in the town was $46,250, and the median income for a family was $48,036. Males had a median income of $35,323 versus $23,977 for females. The per capita income for the town was $17,605. About 4.4% of families and 4.1% of the population were below the poverty line, including 2.4% of those under age 18 and 11.6% of those age 65 or over.
