= C.D. "Buzz" Besadny Anadromous Fish Facility =

Fish egg collection station in Wisconsin, US

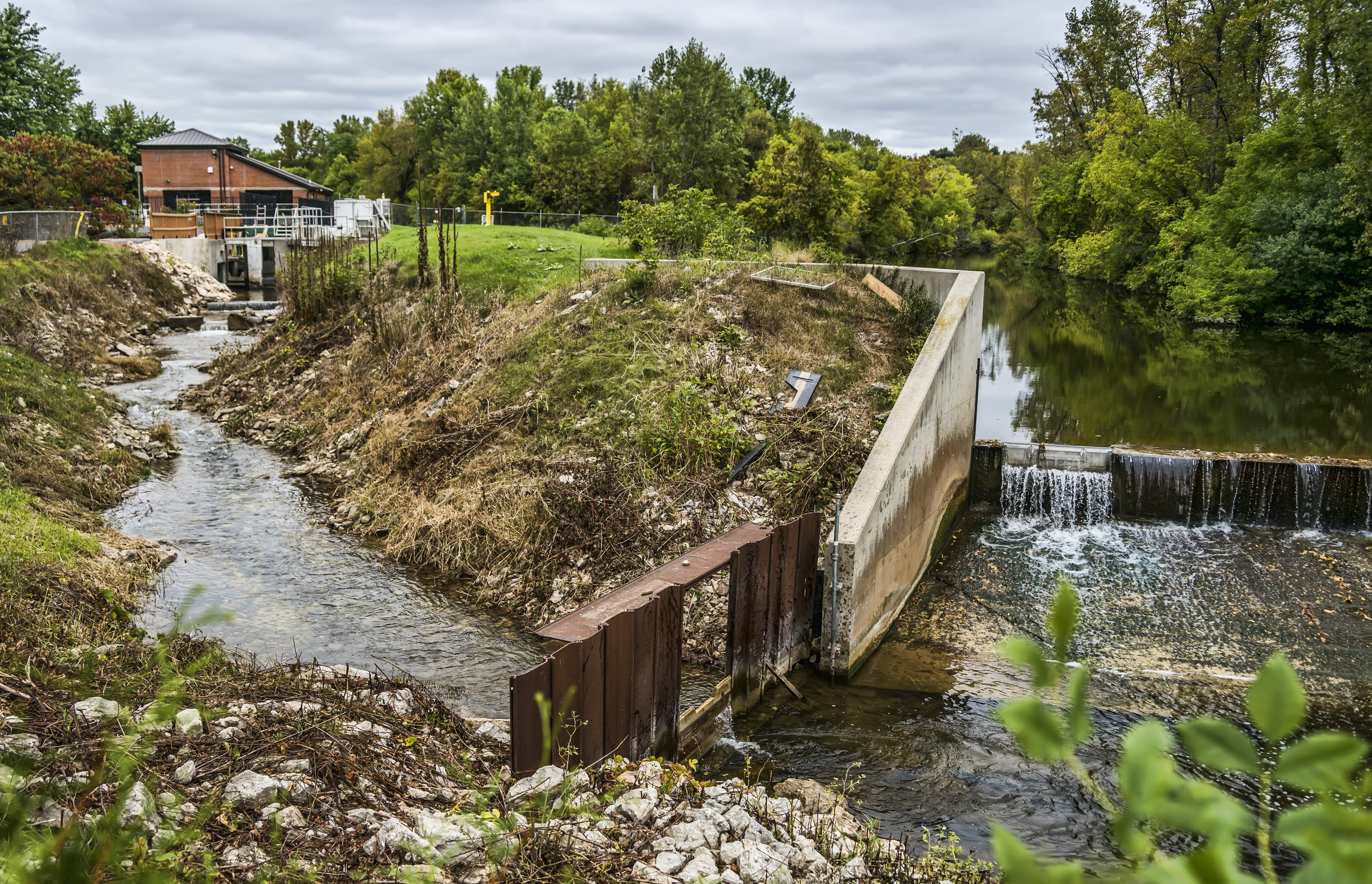
View looking upriver at the old Footbridge dam and fish ladder to the egg collection facility

The C.D. "Buzz" Besadny Anadromous Fish Facility is a Wisconsin Department of Natural Resources egg collection station near the city of Kewaunee. Trout and salmon migrating from Lake Michigan through the Kewaunee River are led by flowing water in a fish ladder to collection ponds. Fish are moved from the ponds into the processing building to be spawned and then sent to hatcheries where they are raised before being released into Lake Michigan's tributaries in order to negate the proliferation of the alewife and support sports fishing.

The facility began operations in 1990, and a processing building and public viewing area was opened in 1996.

== History ==
The site is location of the Kewaunee 'Old Mill', which operated from the mid 1800s to 1936. Once a year the dam was closed and at this location thousands of residents gathered for 'Sucker Day' where sucker fish were easily captured because of the receding waters. A historical marker stands at this site.
