= Casco, Wisconsin =

- Village
- Location of Casco in Kewaunee County, Wisconsin.

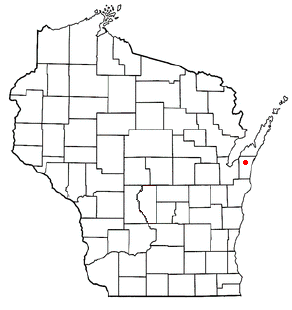
- Location of Casco, Wisconsin
- Coordinates: 44°32′16″N 87°35′35″W
- Country: United States
- State: Wisconsin
- County: Kewaunee

Area
  - Total: 0.67 sq mi (1.74 km^{2})
  - Land: 0.66 sq mi (1.72 km^{2})
  - Water: 0.0039 sq mi (0.01 km^{2})
- Elevation: 728 ft (222 m)

Population (2020)
  - Total: 630
  - Density: 950/sq mi (370/km^{2})
- Time zone: UTC-6 (Central (CST))
  - Summer (DST): UTC-5 (CDT)
- Area code: 920
- FIPS code: 55-12875
- GNIS feature ID: 1582921
- Website: villageofcascowi.gov

Casco is a village in Kewaunee County, Wisconsin, United States. The population was 630 at the 2020 census. It is part of the Green Bay Metropolitan Statistical Area. The village is located within the Town of Casco. Casco is named after Casco Bay on the coast of Maine, the previous home of Edward Decker, an early logger in Kewaunee County.

== Geography ==
Casco is located at 44°33′15″N 87°37′14″W (44.554174, -87.620741).

According to the United States Census Bureau, the village has a total area of 0.69 square miles (1.79 km^{2}), of which 0.68 square miles (1.76 km^{2}) is land and 0.01 square miles (0.03 km^{2}) is water.

== Demographics ==
Historical population
Census	Pop.	Note	%±
1930	246		—
1940	292		18.7%
1950	389		33.2%
1960	460		18.3%
1970	481		4.6%
1980	484		0.6%
1990	544		12.4%
2000	572		5.1%
2010	583		1.9%
2020	630		8.1%
U.S. Decennial Census

=== 2010 census ===
As of the census of 2010, there were 583 people, 230 households, and 155 families living in the village. The population density was 857.4 inhabitants per square mile (331.0/km^{2}). There were 247 housing units at an average density of 363.2 per square mile (140.2/km^{2}). The racial makeup of the village was 91.1% White, 1.0% African American, 2.4% Native American, 3.8% from other races, and 1.7% from two or more races. Hispanic or Latino of any race were 7.5% of the population.

There were 230 households, of which 37.0% had children under the age of 18 living with them, 53.5% were married couples living together, 11.3% had a female householder with no husband present, 2.6% had a male householder with no wife present, and 32.6% were non-families. 28.3% of all households were made up of individuals, and 17.4% had someone living alone who was 65 years of age or older. The average household size was 2.53 and the average family size was 3.15.

The median age in the village was 35.6 years. 29.7% of residents were under the age of 18; 4.8% were between the ages of 18 and 24; 27.7% were from 25 to 44; 21.6% were from 45 to 64; and 16.3% were 65 years of age or older. The gender makeup of the village was 47.5% male and 52.5% female.

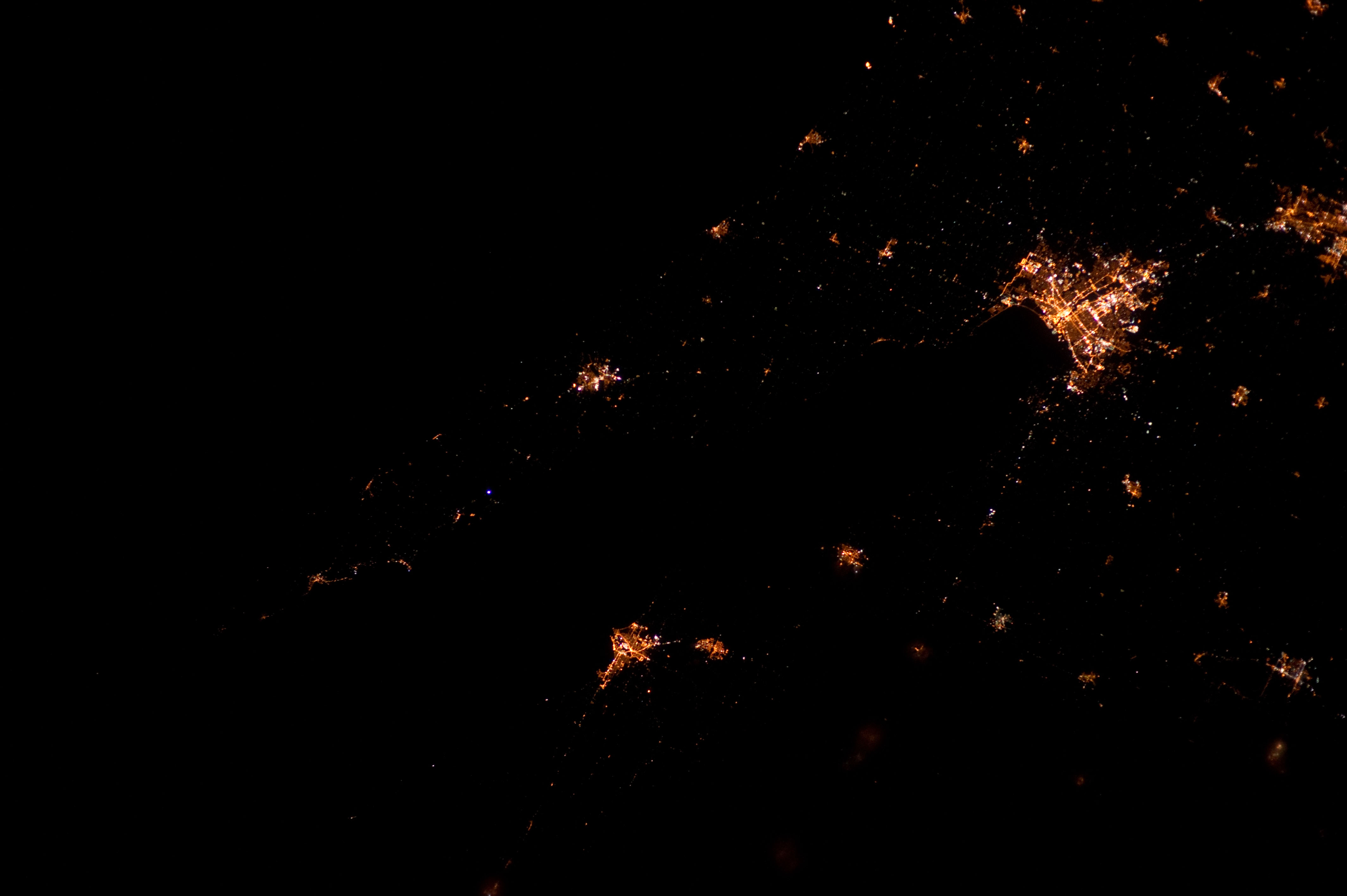
Casco, 1:10 AM CDT

=== 2000 census ===
As of the census of 2000, there were 572 people, 227 households, and 162 families living in the village. The population density was 1,022.1 inhabitants per square mile (394.6/km^{2}). There were 236 housing units at an average density of 421.7/sq mi (162.8/km^{2}). The racial makeup of the village was 97.55% White, 0.70% Native American, 0.87% from other races, and 0.87% from two or more races. 0.87% of the population were Hispanic or Latino of any race.

There were 227 households, out of which 34.8% had children under the age of 18 living with them, 60.4% were married couples living together, 7.0% had a female householder with no husband present, and 28.2% were non-families. 25.1% of all households were made up of individuals, and 12.8% had someone living alone who was 65 years of age or older. The average household size was 2.52 and the average family size was 3.01.

In the village, the population was spread out, with 27.1% under the age of 18, 7.2% from 18 to 24, 30.6% from 25 to 44, 18.7% from 45 to 64, and 16.4% who were 65 years of age or older. The median age was 36 years. For every 100 females, there were 93.9 males. For every 100 females age 18 and over, there were 91.3 males.

The median income for a household in the village was $44,583, and the median income for a family was $50,000. Males had a median income of $36,029 versus $24,444 for females. The per capita income for the village was $18,168. About 2.8% of families and 4.0% of the population were below the poverty line, including 1.9% of those under age 18 and 9.6% of those age 65 or over.

== Gallery ==
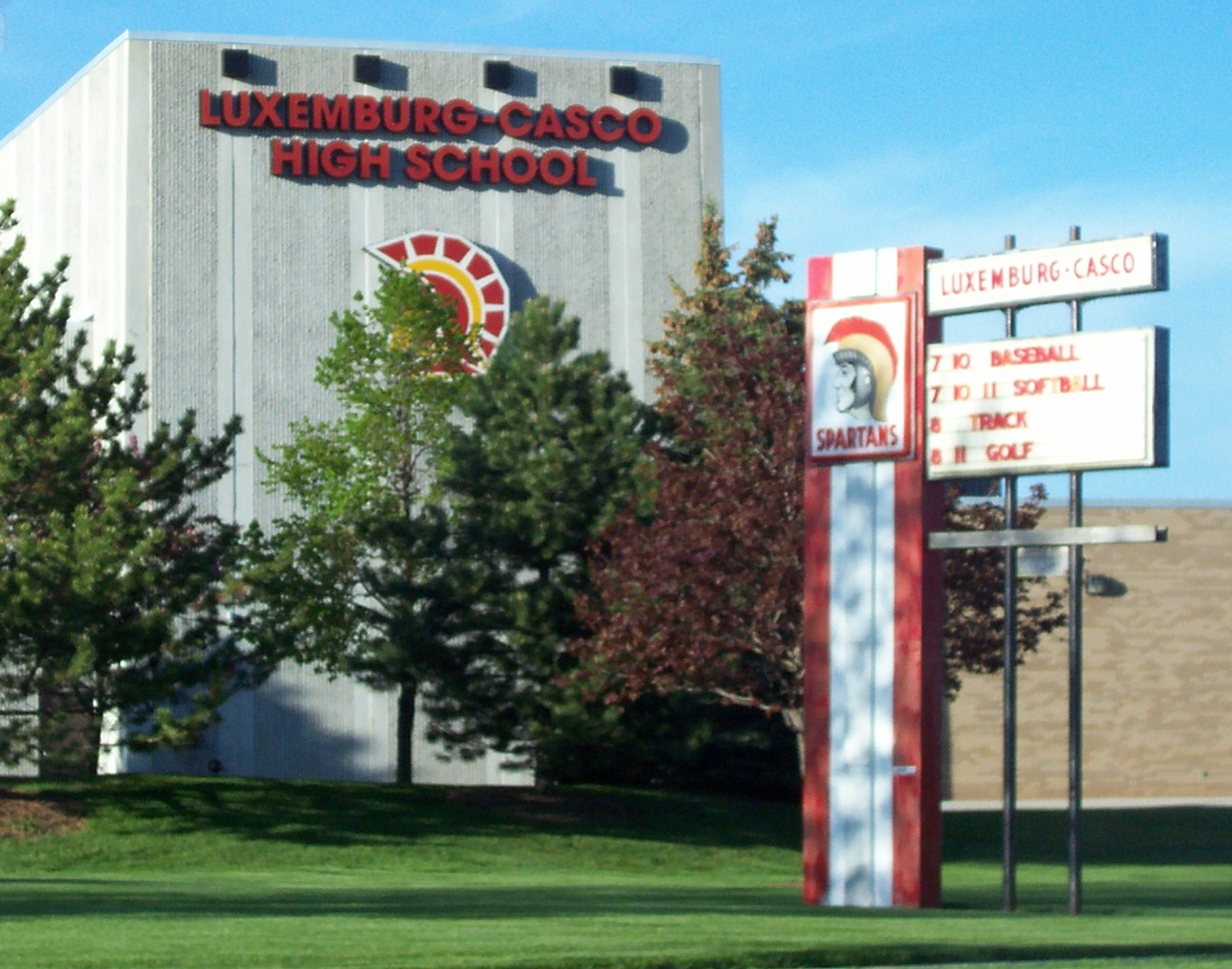
Luxemburg-Casco High School

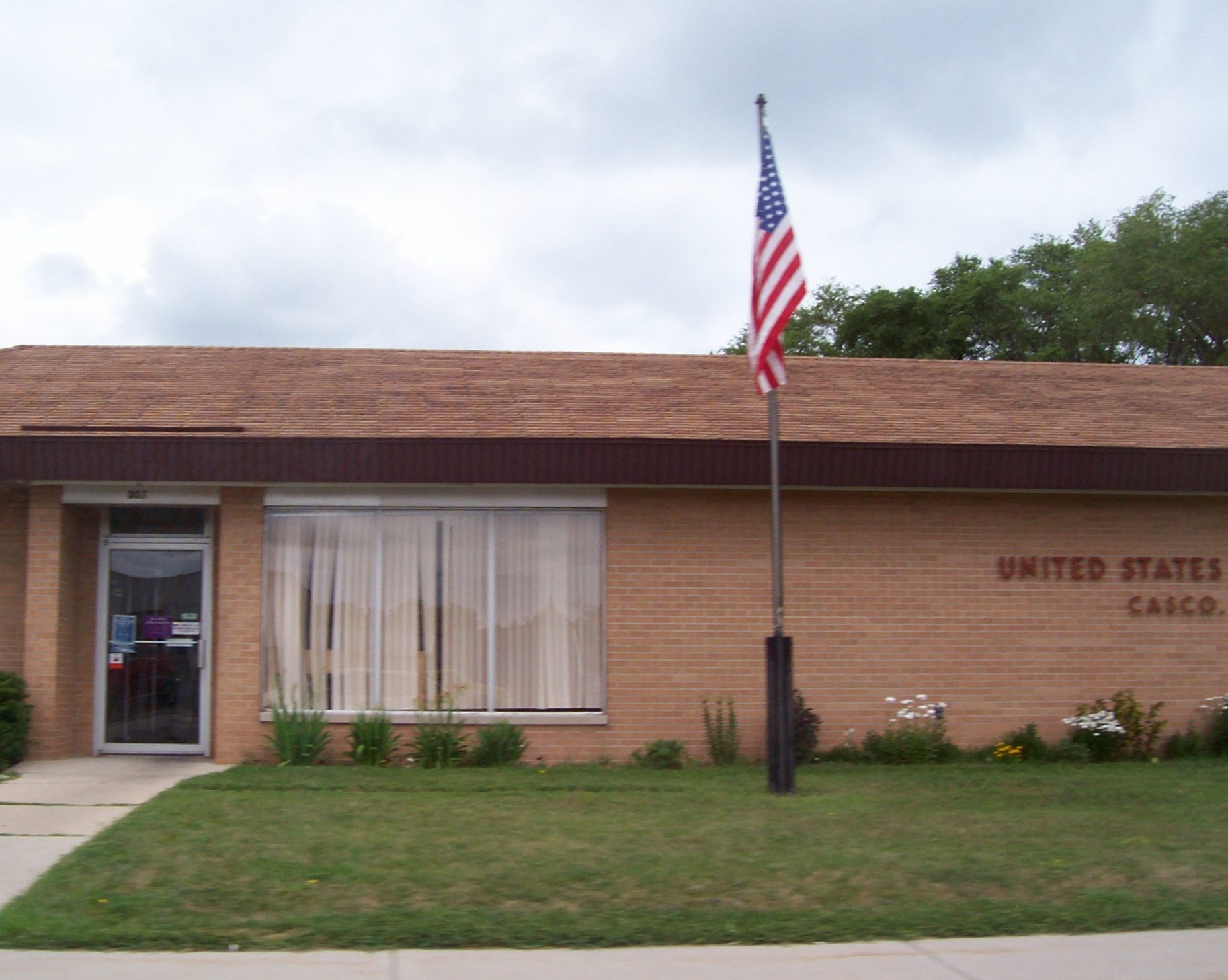
Post office

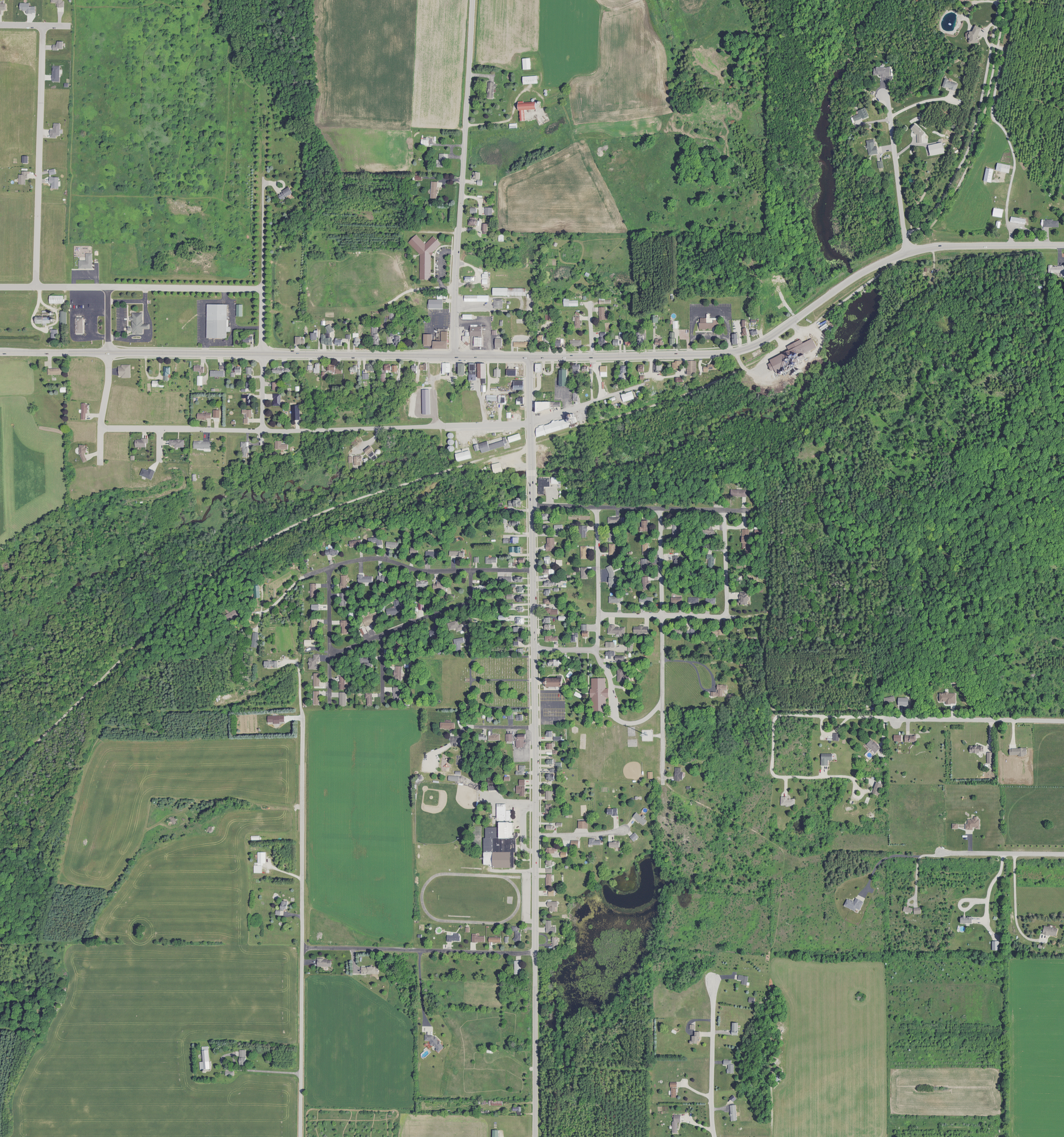
Casco on August 7, 2020

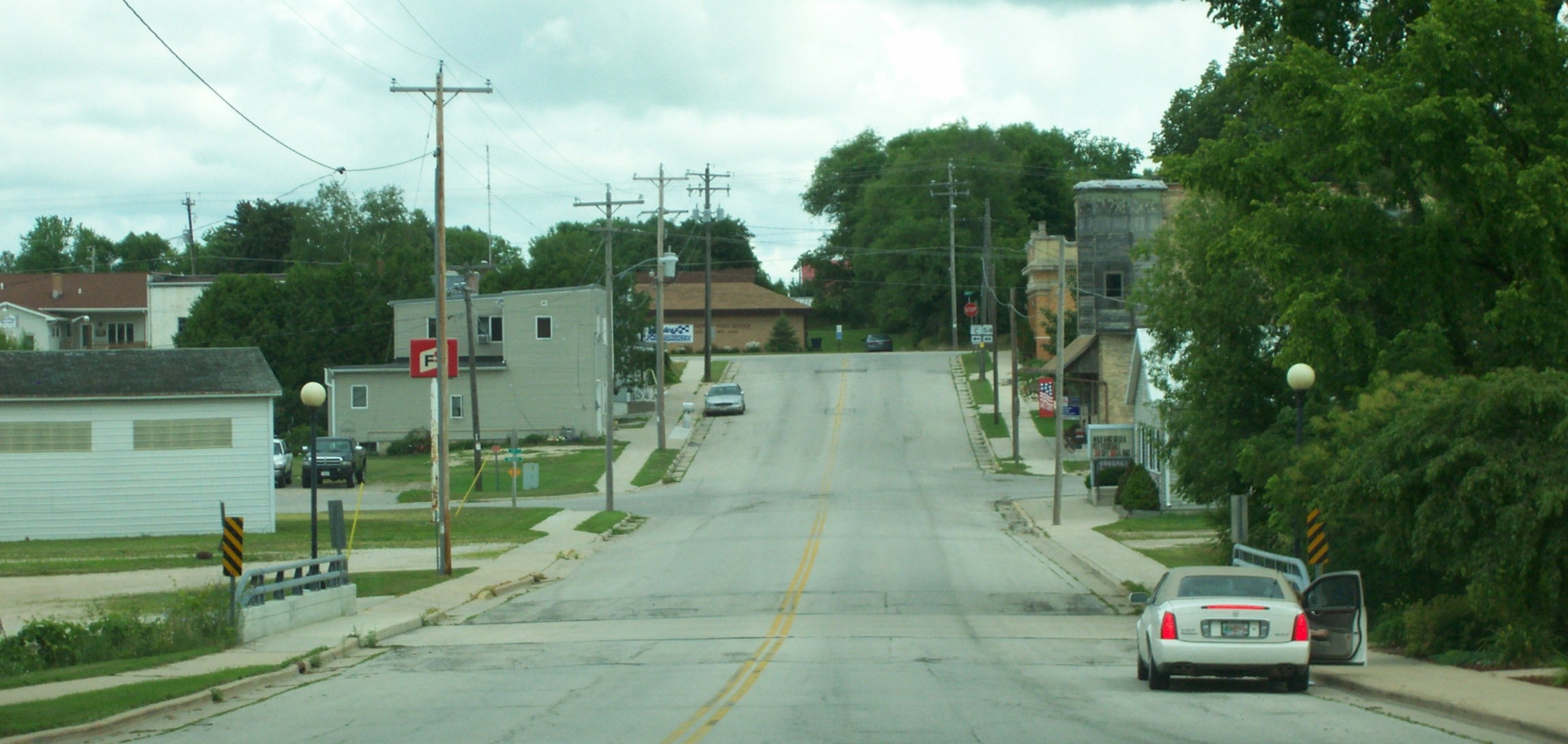
Downtown Casco

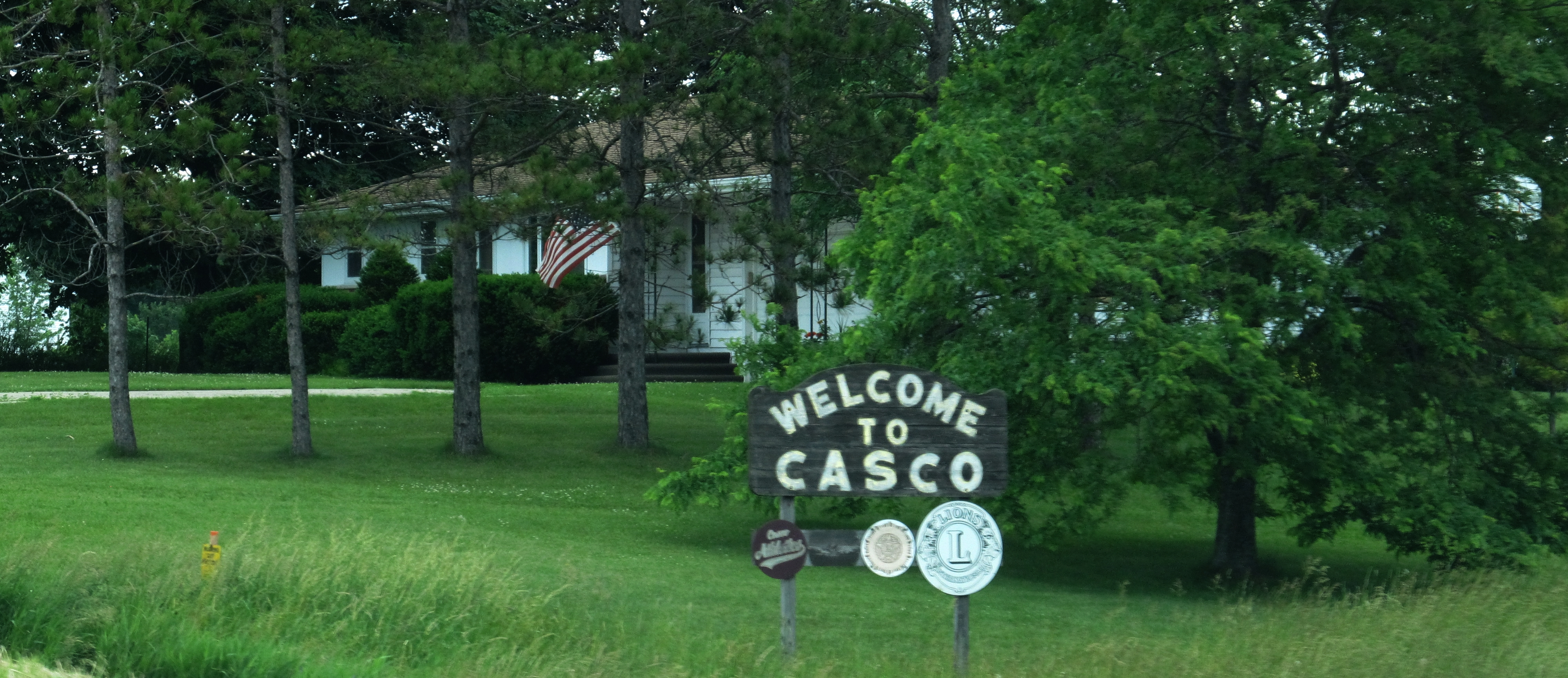

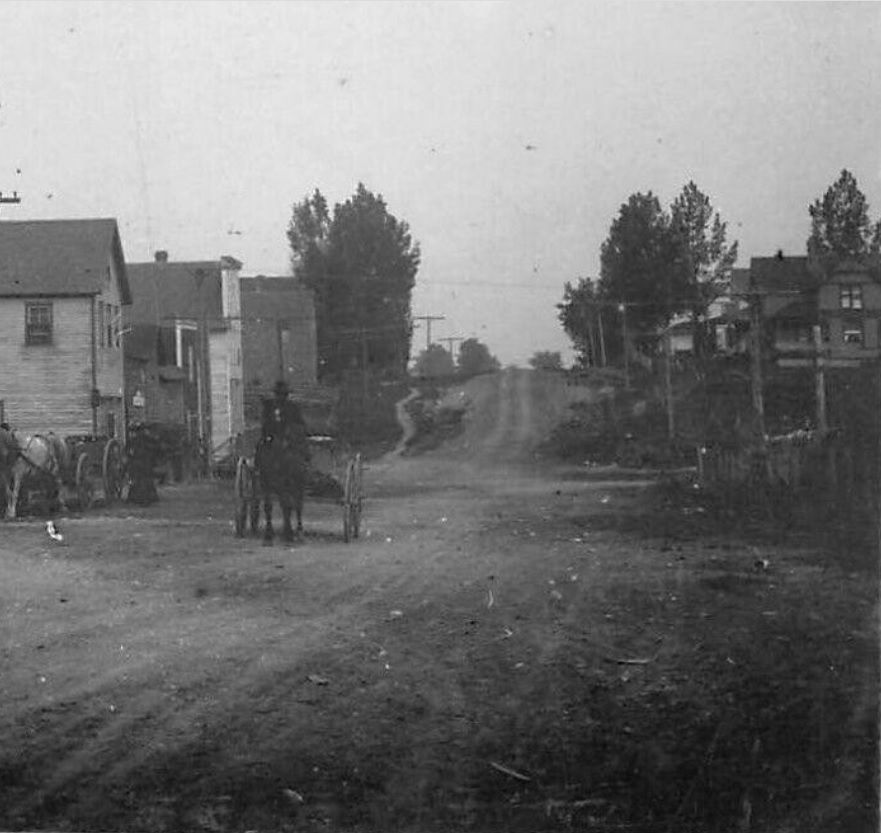
Looking west; from an early postcard
