= Kewaunee River =

River in Wisconsin, United States

Coordinates: 44°27′28″N 87°29′28″W

The Kewaunee River is a 27.9-mile-long (44.9 km) river in the U.S. state of Wisconsin. It begins near Frog Station in northwest Kewaunee County and flows southeast to empty into Lake Michigan at the city of Kewaunee.

On a yearly basis, the Wisconsin Department of Natural Resources stocks approximately 72,000 Chinook salmon, 132,000 coho salmon, 102,000 steelhead and 54,000 brown trout into the Kewaunee River, hoping to imprint them to the river so that when they mature they return to it and will be captured for egg collection.

== Gallery ==
Aerial photo of the river passing from the town of Casco into the town of West Kewaunee, taken August 7, 2020.

Mouth of the river into Lake Michigan, taken June 27, 2020

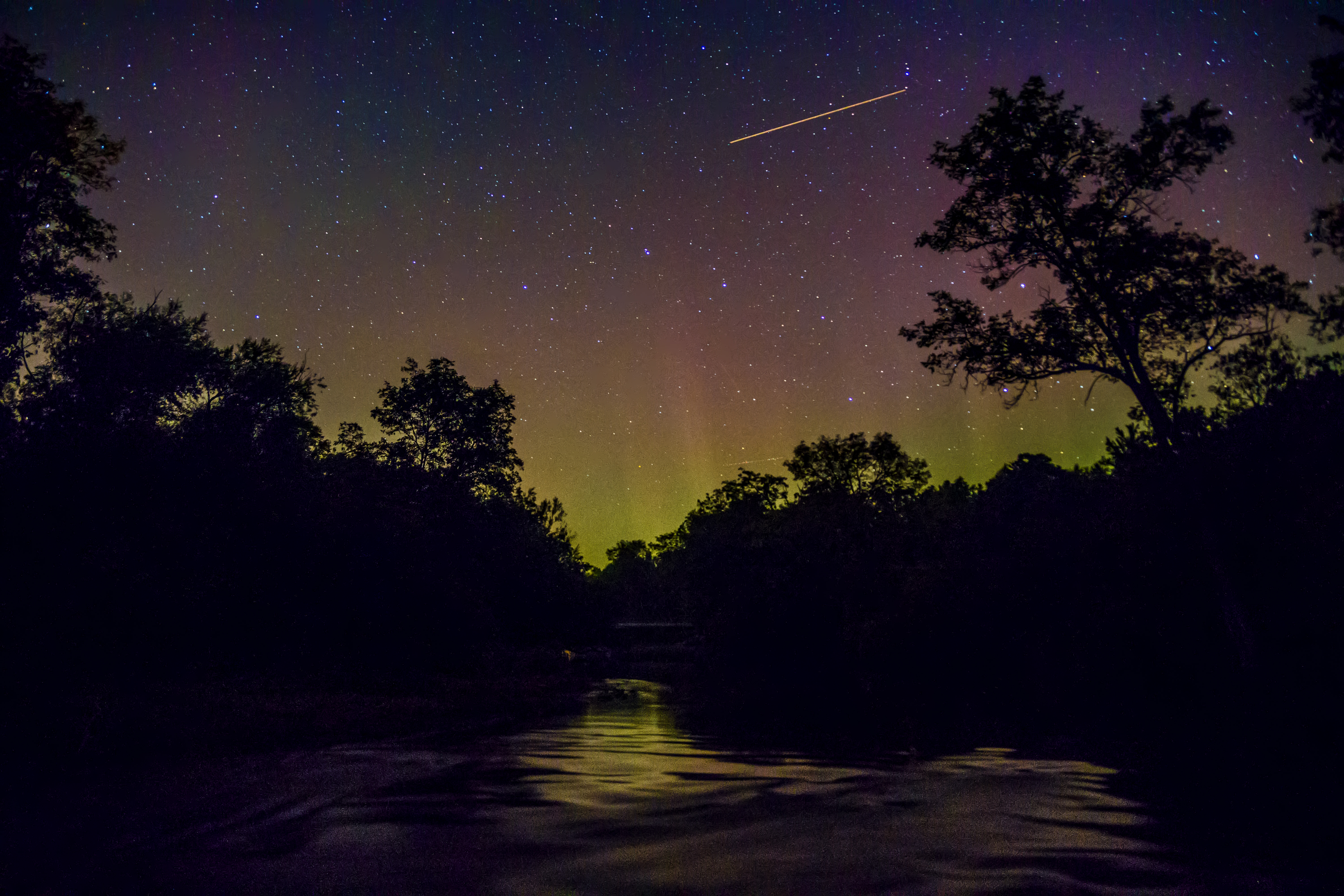
Shooting star seen through an aurora, taken over the Kewaunee River.

== See also ==
- C.D. "Buzz" Besadny Anadromous Fish Facility
- Ahnapee State Trail, runs partly along the Kewaunee River
