= Wisconsin's Kewaunee County Assembly district =

Former American legislative district

Wisconsin's Kewaunee County State Assembly district
- Obsolete
- Notes: 1861–1866; 1876–1888; 1892–1954

Wisconsin's Kewaunee County Assembly district was a district in the Wisconsin State Assembly for several years in the history of the state of Wisconsin, prior to the legislative redistricting reforms of 1972 which created the current numbered districts. Located in northeast Wisconsin, the district comprised the whole of Kewaunee County, Wisconsin.

The district was in use for elections from 1861 through 1865, again from 1876 through 1886, then again for elections between 1892 and 1952.

== List of representatives ==
List of representatives from the Kewaunee County district
Member	Party	Residence	Term start	Term end	Leg.
Kewaunee County was previously part of the Door–Kewaunee–Oconto–Shawano Assembly district
District created by 1861 Wisconsin Act 216
George W. Elliott	Dem.	Ahnapee	January 6, 1862	January 5, 1863	15th
Mathias Simon	Dem.	Ahnapee	January 5, 1863	January 4, 1864	16th
Nelson Boutin	Dem.	Kewaunee	January 4, 1864	January 2, 1865	17th
Lyman Walker	Dem.	Kewaunee	January 2, 1865	January 1, 1866	18th
Constant Martin	Dem.	Dyckesville	January 1, 1866	January 7, 1867	19th
District abolished by 1866 Wisconsin Act 101; Kewaunee County became part of the Door–Kewaunee Assembly district
District re-established by 1876 Wisconsin Act 343
Charles Tisch	Dem.	Carlton	January 1, 1877	January 6, 1879	30th 31st
John Carel	Dem.	Kewaunee	January 6, 1879	January 5, 1880	32nd
Joseph E. Darbellay	Dem.	Kewaunee	January 5, 1880	January 2, 1882	33rd 34th
William Rogers	Dem.	Carlton	January 2, 1882	January 1, 1883	35th
Louis Bruemmer	Rep.	Kewaunee	January 1, 1883	January 5, 1885	36th
Joseph E. Darbellay	Dem.	Kewaunee	January 5, 1885	January 3, 1887	37th
Michael C. Haney	Dem.	Ahnapee	January 3, 1887	January 7, 1889	38th
District abolished by 1887 Wisconsin Act 461; Kewaunee and Manitowoc counties were organized into the Kewaunee–Manitowoc 1st, Kewaunee–Manitowoc 2nd, Kewaunee–Manitowoc 3rd, and Kewaunee–Manitowoc 4th Assembly districts
District re-established by 1892 Wisconsin Special Session 2 Act 1
Joseph Filz	Dem.	Luxemburg	January 2, 1893	January 7, 1895	41st
Jacob Rodrian	Dem.	Ahnapee	January 7, 1895	January 4, 1897	42nd
Maynard T. Parker	Rep.	Ahnapee	January 4, 1897	January 2, 1899	43rd
John W. Adams	Rep.	Kewaunee	January 2, 1899	January 7, 1901	44th
William Rogers	Dem.	Kewaunee	January 7, 1901	January 5, 1903	45th
L. Albert Karel	Dem.	Kewaunee	January 5, 1903	January 2, 1905	46th
Anton G. Schauer	Rep.	Carlton	January 2, 1905	January 4, 1909	47th 48th
Moses Shaw	Rep.	Ahnapee	January 4, 1909	January 2, 1911	49th
August Fenske	Dem.	Ahnapee	January 2, 1911	January 6, 1913	50th
Paul Hoverson	Rep.	Franklin	January 6, 1913	January 4, 1915	51st
William H. O'Brien	Dem.	Franklin	January 4, 1915	January 3, 1921	52nd 53rd 54th
Anton Holly	Rep.	Carlton	January 3, 1921	January 3, 1927	55th 56th 57th
Anton G. Schauer	Rep.	Kewaunee	January 3, 1927	January 5, 1931	58th 59th
Jacob J. Blahnik	Dem.	Algoma	January 5, 1931	January 2, 1933	60th
Albert D. Shimek	Dem.	Algoma	January 2, 1933	January 6, 1941	61st 62nd 63rd 64th
Joseph M. Mleziva	Rep.	Luxemburg	January 6, 1941	January 3, 1949	65th 66th 67th 68th
Julius Stangel	Rep.	Kewaunee	January 3, 1949	January 3, 1955	69th 70th 71st
District abolished by 1951 Wisconsin Act 728 (implemented 1954); Kewaunee County became part of the Door–Kewaunee Assembly district
