= John W. Adams (Wisconsin politician) =

American politician (1862–1939)

Member of the Wisconsin State Assembly from the Kewaunee County district
- In office January 2, 1899 – January 7, 1901
- Preceded by: Maynard T. Parker
- Succeeded by: William Rogers

Chairman of the Board of Supervisors of Kewaunee County, Wisconsin
- In office April 1893 – April 1894

Personal details
- Born: July 4, 1862 Kewaunee, Wisconsin, U.S.
- Died: June 25, 1939 (aged 76) Kewaunee, Wisconsin, U.S.
- Resting place: Riverview Public Cemetery, Kewaunee, Wisconsin
- Party: Democratic
- Spouse: married
- Children: Otto W. Adams; (b. 1892; died 1968)
- Education: Lawrence University
- Occupation: Teacher, farmer

John W. Adams (July 4, 1862 – June 25, 1939) was an American farmer and Democratic politician. He was a member of the Wisconsin State Assembly, representing Kewaunee County in the 1899 session. He was also chairman of the Kewaunee County board in 1893–1894.

== Biography ==
John W. Adams was born in Kewaunee, Wisconsin, and lived almost his entire life in that vicinity. He was educated in the Kewaunee area public schools and then attended Lawrence University. From age 16, he worked as a teacher for several years, but later purchased a plot of land just outside the southern limits of the city and took up farming.

He served on the Kewaunee town board for many years, and was chairman of the town board. He also was selected as chairman of the county board of supervisors in 1893. In 1898, he was elected to the Wisconsin State Assembly from the Kewaunee district. He defeated Republican John L. Haney with 55% of the vote and did not run for another term in 1900.

== Personal life and family ==
John W. Adams died at his home in Kewaunee on June 25, 1939, after a brief illness. He was survived by his wife and one son.

Wisconsin State Assembly
Preceded by Maynard T. Parker	Member of the Wisconsin State Assembly from the Kewaunee district January 2, 1899 – January 7, 1901	Succeeded by William Rogers
