= Jacob J. Blahnik =

American politician

Jacob Joseph Blahnik (August 2, 1881 – January 30, 1954) was an American farmer, businessman, teacher, and legislator from Algoma, Wisconsin. He served one term as a member of the Wisconsin State Assembly from the Kewaunee County seat and was an unsuccessful candidate for various other offices.

== Background ==
Blahnik was born in the town of Ahnapee in Kewaunee County, son of the Jacob Blahnik Sr. and Katherine Göttinger Blahnik, both natives of Bohemia, and was educated in the public schools. He attended the University of Wisconsin, spent two years as a schoolteacher, worked as an assessor, and helped re-organize the local telephone company. Before election to the Assembly, he had served as a director of the local federal land bank, the Algoma Farmers Cooperative, and the Bank of Algoma, and was an examining committee member of the latter; but in 1930 he described his occupation as "farmer".

== Public office ==
=== General Assembly ===
After defeating former Assemblyman August Fenske in the 1930 Democratic primary election (with 157 votes to Fenske's 67), Blahnik defeated Republican incumbent Anton Schauer and former Republican Assemblyman Anton Holly (who had lost the Republican primary to Schauer), with 1663 votes to Schauer's 1511 and Holly's 1129. Blahnik is listed in some sources as a Progressive, and was endorsed by the Kewaunee County Progressive organization (which had backed a third candidate) after Schauer won the primary; but Blahnik had won the Democratic primary against Fenske, and served in the Assembly as a Democrat. He was assigned to the standing committees on commerce and manufactures, and on elections.

In the spring legislative session, a bill introduced by Blahnik to reduce the salaries of all state workers and officials making more than $90 a month (later modified to $150) drew a great deal of attention, but little support. Blahnik argued that this would give the workers and officials a chance to display patriotism, and provide relief from taxes for farmers. At a hearing to discuss the bill, Blahnik was the only witness in its favor. He also drew attention for his proposal that the legislature petition President Hoover to suspend enforcement of Prohibition "during the present period of economic depression", declaring that the general welfare should take precedence over the Constitution in such critical times. He had more luck with a bill to exempt horses, mules, wagons, carriages, sleighs and harness from personal property tax, as had just been done with automobiles. A committee of representatives from farm organizations later announced a renewed push for Blahnik's wage-cut bill, explaining that because of the lower prices of farm products, farmers' expenses must be reduced by cutting prices, and that Wisconsin was called upon to set an example in order to push private employers to slash wages nationwide and then cut prices paid by farmers.

=== Run for Congress, and after ===
In 1932, rather than seek re-election to the Assembly as previously reported, Blahnik ran for the Democratic nomination for the newly-redistricted Wisconsin's 8th congressional district. He lost, coming in third behind eventual victor James F. Hughes and William Wright (also of Kewaunee). He almost immediately announced that he would run for the Congressional seat anyway, and for his old Assembly seat as well, as an independent. Although he would later tell a Madison reporter that this announcement was made "in a spirit of humor", he did eventually file for his own Assembly seat, drawing only 105 votes to Democratic nominee Albert Shimek's 3,663 and Republican Joseph M. Mleziva's 2,170.

He ran again for the Democratic nomination in 1934, losing the primary to Shimek by 589 to 1,184; and ran in the general election as an "Independent Progressive Democrat", polling 716 votes to Shimek's 2,525 and Progressive Oscar Berg's 2,089. He did the same thing in 1936, drawing 776 votes to Shimek's 985, and this time running in the general as an "Independent Democrat", coming in second with 1,546 votes to Shimek's 2,704, Progressive Arthur Johns' 1,160 and Republican Emil Leitschow's 987.

== Later years ==
By 1950, he had been living in Green Bay for five years, and ran in the Democratic primary for the Assembly district for Green Bay against the incumbent, Robert E. "Bobby" Lynch. He had been working for various Green Bay firms, having retired after 32 years of farming in Kewaunee County. He lost to Lynch, who drew 2,911 votes to Blahnik's 795.

In February 1953, he was a candidate for the joint position of alderman-county supervisor in Green Bay's sixth ward, by which time he had been in that city for eight years. He was a widower with one child.

He died in 1954 in a Green Bay hospital of pneumonia after a short illness. He was survived by his wife, Emma Nolde (1883–1945), their daughter Valeria Catherin (1910-1996). Their son Sylvester died as an infant and another son, Melvin, died in 1935.
