= Julius Stangel =

20th century American politician

Julius P. Stangel

Chairman of the Board of Supervisors of Kewaunee County, Wisconsin
- In office July 3, 1957 – April 1960
- Preceded by: Arthur C. Walecka
- Succeeded by: Donald Quistorff

Member of the Wisconsin State Assembly from the Kewaunee County district
- In office January 3, 1949 – January 3, 1955
- Preceded by: Joseph M. Mleziva
- Succeeded by: District abolished

Personal details
- Born: December 29, 1893 Tisch Mills, Wisconsin, U.S.
- Died: February 17, 1989 (aged 95) Kewaunee, Wisconsin, U.S.
- Resting place: Holy Rosary Cemetery, Kewaunee
- Party: Republican
- Spouse: Clara Polly Stoller (m. 1919; died 1974)
- Children: Harvey Julius Stangel^{(b. 1923; died 2006)}; Daniel E. Stangel^{(b. 1926; died 1995)}; Paul Julius Stangel^{(b. 1929; died 2012)}; Margaret Stangel^{(b. 1932; died 2001)}
- Education: Hoffman's Business College
- Occupation: Farmer, businessman, banker

Julius Paul Stangel (December 29, 1893 – February 17, 1989) was an American farmer, businessman, banker, and Republican politician from Kewaunee, Wisconsin. He was a member of the Wisconsin State Assembly for three terms, representing Kewaunee County from 1949 to 1955. He also served three years as chairman of the Kewaunee County board of supervisors.

== Biography ==
Julius Stangel was born on December 29, 1893, at Tisch Mills, Wisconsin, an unincorporated settlement in the town of Carlton, in Kewaunee County. He was raised and educated in that area and graduated from Kewaunee High School in Kewaunee, Wisconsin. He then completed a one-year course at Hoffman's Business College (later Milwaukee Business College) in Milwaukee, graduating in 1913. Returning to Kewaunee, he became a farmer in 1915.

Through his farming interests, Stangel became involved in several related businesses, including cheesemaking and banking. He was a shareholder in the State Bank of Kewaunee and was elected a director in 1920, remaining on the board of that bank for the next 55 years. He entered local office in 1926, when he was elected treasurer for the town of Carlton. He served three years in that office, and was then elected town clerk in 1929, serving in that role for another three years.

He also became involved in the farm store and dairy cooperatives, and was hired as manager of the Kewaunee Cooperative Store in 1936, making that his primary occupation for the next twelve years. During the years of World War II, he also on the county war board and was chairman of the local red cross and bond drives.

In 1948, Kewaunee County's incumbent state representative, Joseph M. Mleziva, announced that he was not seeking re-election, citing poor pay and the abuse he received from constituents. Stangel announced his candidacy for the Republican nomination and did not face an opponent in the primary. He went on to win the general election with 57% of the vote. He was re-elected in 1950 and 1952.

A new redistricting plan went into effect in 1954, which combined Kewaunee County and Door County into a single district. Door County incumbent Republican state representative, Frank N. Graass, announced early in 1954 that he would seek election in the new combined district. Stangel eventually decided that he would also run for the Republican nomination in the new district. Graass ultimately prevailed in the primary and went on to represent the district in the 1955 session. After leaving office, Stangel devoted more of his attention to the State Bank of Kewaunee, where he was appointed cashier in 1955.

Prior to the 1954 election, Stangel had moved from his farm in Carlton into the city of Kewaunee, and in early 1954, he was appointed to the Kewaunee County board of supervisors to fill a vacancy. In 1957, Stangel was elected chairman of the county board, following the resignation of the previous chairman, Arthur Walecka. He served two more years as chairman, before being replaced by Donald Quistorff in 1960.

Stangel was made vice president of the bank in 1967 but retired from any active role in the bank just a year later. He continued as a member of the board of directors for several more years.

== Personal life and family ==
Julius Stangel was the fourth of eight children born to Paul Stangel and his wife Amelia (née Seidl).

Julius Stangel married Clara P. Stoller on June 17, 1919. They had four children together, and were married for 55 years before her death in 1974.

Julius Stangel died at a hospital in Kewaunee, Wisconsin, on February 17, 1989, at age 95. At the time of his death, he was survived by all four of his children, 29 grandchildren, and 25 great-grandchildren.

Wisconsin State Assembly
Preceded by Joseph M. Mleziva	Member of the Wisconsin State Assembly from the Kewaunee district January 3, 1949 – January 3, 1955	Succeeded by Frank N. Graass
Political offices
Preceded by Arthur C. Walecka	Chairman of the Board of Supervisors of Kewaunee County, Wisconsin; July 3, 1957 – April 1960	Succeeded by Donald Quistorff
