= Anton Holly =

American politician

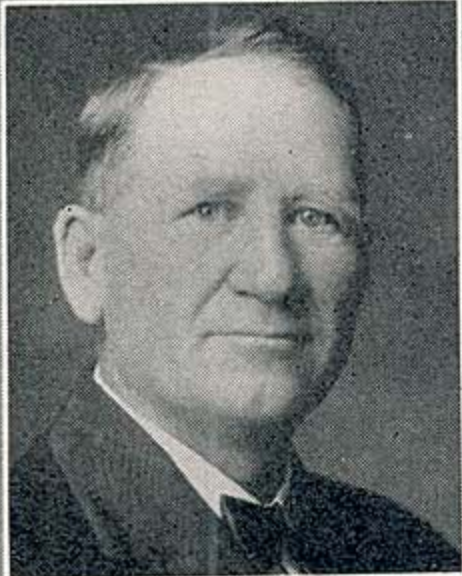
Anton Holly, Wisconsin farmer-legislator

Anton Holly (March 19, 1875 – September 26, 1932) was an American farmer, butcher, and politician from Tisch Mills, Wisconsin.

== Background ==
Born on a farm in the town of Franklin, Kewaunee County, Wisconsin, Holly learned the butcher's trade when he was nineteen years old, winning many meatcutter contests, and established a record of slaughtering and dressing a beef complete for the block in 4 minutes and 26 seconds. He owned a meat market in Tisch Mills, Wisconsin, for eighteen years, and from 1910 owned a farm in the town of Carlton, in Kewaunee County.

== Public office ==
Holly was first elected to the Wisconsin State Assembly's Kewaunee County seat in 1920 (prior to that he had held no public office except as a member of the Carlton town supervisors), as a Republican, with 2,198 votes to 1,124 for former Democratic Assemblyman August Fenske. He was assigned to the standing committee on agriculture. He was re-elected in 1922 with 2,541 votes to 1,037 for Democratic nominee W. J. Marek and 514 for Fenske (now running as an "Independent Republican", after losing to Holly in the Republican primary). He remained on the agriculture committee, and was also appointed to the committee on printing, of which he was chairman. He was re-elected again in 1924, defeating Fenske once more with 1,979 votes to Fenske's 1,685. He served only on the agriculture committee for this term, becoming its chairman. He did not run for re-election in 1926, choosing instead to seek the Republican nomination for Wisconsin's 9th congressional district as a "farmer candidate" against incumbent George J. Schneider (a trade union activist), and many press reports pointed out that as recently as 1922 both of them had been endorsed by progressive Republicans like Governor John J. Blaine and Robert LaFollette Holly lost, with 12,027 votes to Schneider's 26,747. He was succeeded in the Assembly by fellow Republican Anton G. Schauer. He lost again to Schneider in 1928's primary, by 10,789 to 28,956. By that time he was regarded as having gone over entirely to the stalwarts.

In 1930, he attempted to regain his old Assembly seat from Schauer. He lost the primary with 1100 votes to Schauer's 1305 and 608 for Ezra Wiese; and then ran as an independent in the general election, with he and Schauer both losing to Democratic nominee Jacob J. Blahnik, who pulled 1663 votes to Schauer's 1511 and Holly's 1129. Blahnik is listed in one source as a Progressive, and was endorsed by the Kewaunee County Progressive organization (which had backed Wiese) after Schauer won the primary; but Blahnik had won the Democratic primary against Fenske, and served in the Assembly as a Democrat.

Holly was described by the Wisconsin State Journal as "one of the most colorful farm leaders in the legislature". He was a firm opponent of state and university farm projects which he characterized as concentrating on increased crop yield ("making two blades grow where one grew before") without considering whether this would lead to any benefit for farmers; and thus opposed many appropriations for agricultural projects. He also became an outspoken critic of the University's proms after attending one.

== Outside the legislature ==
Holly was a leader in dairy and cheese cooperative movements such as the Wisconsin Cheese Producers' Federation. Holly died at a family home in Kewaunee, Wisconsin after a "very serious operation for a stomach ailment" had hospitalized him in late March. He was survived by his widow and three children.
