= St. Lawrence Catholic Church (Stangelville, Wisconsin) =

Historic church in Wisconsin, United States

- U.S. National Register of Historic Places
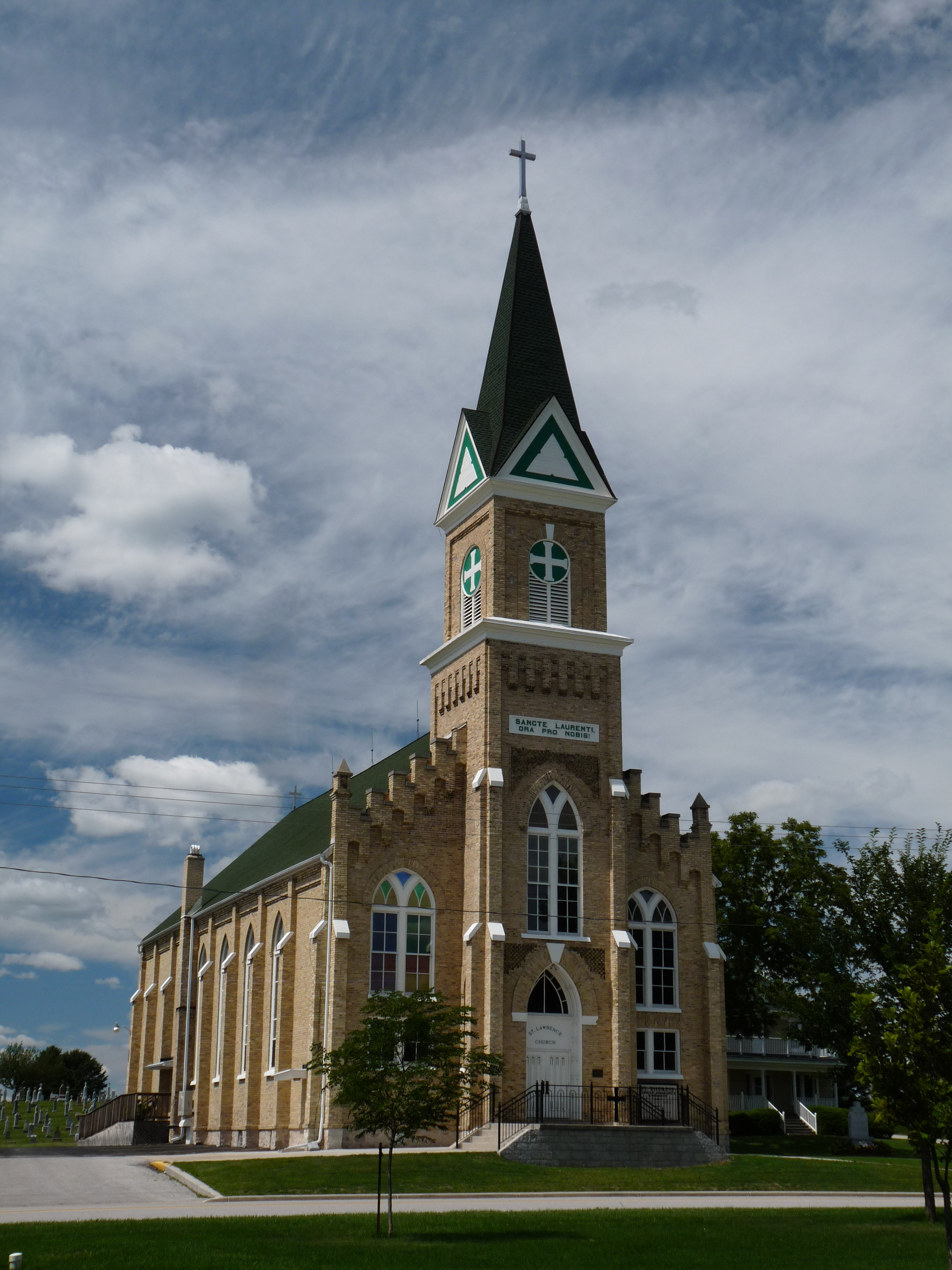
- Location: Stangelville, Wisconsin
- Coordinates: 44.39964°N 87.68473°W
- Built: 1892
- Architect: Jon Paulu (church), W. E. Reynolds (rectory)
- Architectural style: Gothic Revival (church), American Foursquare (rectory)
- NRHP reference No.: 89000056
- Added to NRHP: February 21, 1989

St. Lawrence Catholic Church is a historic church located in Stangelville, Wisconsin. On July 1, 2000, the parish of St. Lawrence merged with St. Hedwig's and St. Joseph-St. John to form the parish of St. Therese de Lisieux, based in Denmark, which continues to use the church as a worship space.

== History ==
The area was settled by many Czech immigrants from the mid-nineteenth century. A group of Chodové from Bohemia came to the Franklin area around 1855. Around 1862, a falling tree fell on six Czech workers, but none were injured, an event taken to be miraculous. In 1863, June Mathias Nemetz donated three acres of land, and a log church with a cedar shingle roof was soon constructed near the site. The first rectory was completed in 1882, replaced by another in 1905.

The parish outgrew this original structure and commissioned a Milwaukee architect, Jon Paulu, to design a new one. Construction began on the brick stricture in 1892, after Fr. Vaclav Kozelka returned as pastor, and was completed in 1894. The church continued to grow and serve as a center for local ethnic Czechs well into the 20th century; Czech remained the language used for religious instruction until 1930, and worship services in Czech were held into the 1940s. In 1996, reflecting a decline in the local population, it was linked with the parish of St. Joseph-St. John of Pilsen. In 1998, both parishes as well as St. Hedwig in West Kewaunee were organized under the same administrator, and finally, on July 1, 2000, the three parishes were merged into the parish of St. Therese de Lisieux.

== Architecture ==
The current Gothic Revival church building was begun in 1892 and completed in 1894, and the rectory was added in 1905. Built of cream brick on a fieldstone foundation, it measures 50 feet by 100 feet, topped by a 150-foot steeple and a steep gabled roof.

The interior is richly decorated with wood carvings, stencils, and stained glass, with a vaulted ceiling rising to 35 feet at the center. An altar hand-carved by Fr. Adalbert Cipin in 1875 was brought for use in a side chapel, where it remains today. The high altar, rising over 30 feet, and several side altars were carved by Joseph Svoboda of Kewaunee in the Perpendicular Gothic style and also remain. William Scheer of Appleton painted frescoes of the life of Christ in 1912 which were restored in 1957 by Louis Shrovnal, himself a Czech church painter of Kewaunee. The church complex was added to the National Register of Historic Places in 1989.
