= August Fenske =

American politician (1858–1938)

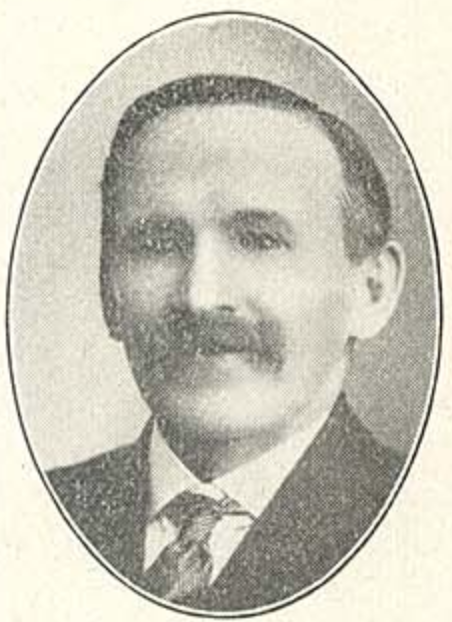
Wisconsin farmer and legislator August Fenske of Kewaunee County

August F. Fenske (1858–1938) was an American farmer and local politician from Ahnapee, Wisconsin, who spent one two-year term as a member of the Wisconsin State Assembly from Kewaunee County.

== Background ==
Fenske was born November 26, 1858, in what was then "Doelitz" or "Dölitz" in the Kingdom of Prussia's Province of Pomerania, and is now officially Dolice, in the West Pomeranian Voivodeship of Poland. At the age of nine, he was brought with his parents as they emigrated to the United States, who settled first in Washington County, Wisconsin, then in late 1870 moved to Crawford County, Wisconsin, where they would live for many years. Fenske received a public school education, and became a farmer. In the year 1858 he purchased a farm of his own in Ahnapee in Kewaunee County, where he settled. In 1886 he married Helene Josephine Mueller.

== Public office ==
By 1910, when he was elected to the Assembly, he had been clerk of the circuit court of Kewaunee County for four years, chairman (equivalent to mayor) of the Town of Ahnapee for three, town clerk for three, and assessor for two years, as well as serving on the district school board, and active in various civic organizations. He was elected as a Democrat, with 1,721 votes to 1,436 for the incumbent, Republican Moses Shaw. He was assigned to the standing committee on fish and game. He was defeated in 1912 by Republican Paul Hoverson, who polled 1565 votes to 1429 for Fenske.

In 1920, he was the Democratic nominee for his old Assembly seat, losing to Republican Anton Holly, with 1,124 votes to Holly's 2,198. In 1922, having lost the Democratic nomination to W. J. Marek, he ran against Holly as an Independent Republican, drawing 514 votes to Marek's 1,037 and Holly's 2,541. In 1924, he was again the Democratic nominee, polling 1,685 votes to 1,979 for Holly. In 1930, he lost the Democratic primary to Jacob J. Blahnik with 67 votes to Blahnik's 157.

== Later years ==
His wife Helene died in 1923. His younger brother Frederick died in 1935. As of 1936, he was reelected to the board of directors of the Kewaunee County county fair, on which he had served at least since 1933.

In late December 1937, Fenske was reported as being in critical condition after having a leg amputated. He died January 14, 1938.
