= Wisconsin's Door–Kewaunee–Oconto–Shawano Assembly district =

Former American legislative district

Wisconsin's Door–Kewaunee–Oconto–Shawano State Assembly district
- Obsolete
- Notes: 1856–1861

Wisconsin's Door–Kewaunee–Oconto–Shawano Assembly district was a district in the Wisconsin State Assembly in the early years of the history of the state of Wisconsin, prior to the legislative redistricting reforms of 1972 which created the current numbered districts. Located in northeast Wisconsin, the district comprised the whole of Door, Kewaunee, Oconto, and Shawano counties.

The district was in use for elections from 1856 through 1860. For the years that this district existed, Oconto and Shawano counties and, thus, this district, were larger than the modern boundaries of Oconto and Shawano counties. The boundaries of Oconto and Shawano continued to shift during these years, most notably they absorbed territory that was previously attached to Winnebago County (west of the Wolf River), and surrendered a strip of territory at the far western edge of the district to Marathon County.

== List of representatives ==
List of representatives from the Door–Kewaunee–Oconto–Shawano district
Member	Party	Residence	Term start	Term end	Leg.
Door and Kewaunee counties were previously part of the Brown–Door–Kewaunee Assembly district Oconto and Shawano counties were previously part of the Oconto–Outagamie–Waupaca Assembly district
District created by 1856 Wisconsin Act 109
Ezra B. Stevens	Rep.	Sturgeon Bay	January 5, 1857	January 4, 1858	10th
Jonathan C. Hall	Dem.	Marinette	January 4, 1858	January 3, 1859	11th
Matthias Simon	Dem.	Ahnapee	January 3, 1859	January 2, 1860	12th
John Wiley	Dem.	Shawano	January 2, 1860	January 7, 1861	13th
William S. Finley	Rep.	Kewaunee	January 7, 1861	January 6, 1862	14th
District abolished by 1861 Wisconsin Act 216; Kewaunee County became a single-county Assembly district Door, Oconto, and Shawano counties became part of the Door–Oconto–Shawano district
