= David Scott (Wisconsin pioneer) =

New York and Wisconsin politician (1795–1864)

- David Scott portrait ca.1860

Member of the Wisconsin State Assembly from the Oconto–Outagamie–Waupaca district
- In office January 14, 1854 – January 1, 1855
- Preceded by: John B. Jacobs
- Succeeded by: Perry H. Smith

Chairman of the Board of Supervisors of Waupaca County, Wisconsin
- In office April 1851 – May 6, 1851
- Preceded by: Position established
- Succeeded by: Tyler Caldwell

Member of the New York State Assembly from the Genesee County district
- In office January 1, 1841 – January 1, 1842 Serving with John W. Brownson, Samuel Richmond, & Isaac N. Stoddard
- In office January 1, 1826 – January 1, 1827 Serving with Josiah Churchill & Phineas Stanton

Personal details
- Born: March 11, 1795 Albany, New York, U.S.
- Died: June 5, 1864 (aged 69) Attica, New York, U.S.
- Resting place: Forest Hill Cemetery, Attica, New York
- Party: Democratic
- Spouse: Maria Stanton (m. 1822–1864)
- Children: Winfield Scott^{(b. 1823; died 1906)}; Walter Scott^{(b. 1825; died 1850)}; Ellen Maria (Bigelow)^{(b. 1827; died 1899)}; John David Scott^{(b. 1834; died 1890)}; Jeannie Deans (Dike)^{(b. 1837; died 1920)}; Thomas Scott^{(b. 1842; died 1932)}; Unnamed baby^{(b. 1845; died 1845)}
- Relatives: Norman S. Dike (grandson); Phineas Stanton (father-in-law)

David Scott (March 11, 1795 – June 5, 1864) was an American merchant, politician, and pioneer of western New York and Wisconsin. He was one of the earliest American settlers at Waupaca, Wisconsin, serving as the first postmaster, first chairman of the Waupaca County Board of Supervisors, and first representative of Waupaca County in the Wisconsin State Assembly, serving in the 1854 term. Before coming to Wisconsin, he was a prominent businessman in the area of Attica, New York, and served two terms in the New York State Assembly, representing Genesee County during the 1826 and 1841 terms.

== Biography ==
David Scott was born in Albany, New York, in 1795. As a child, he moved with his parents to western New York. During the War of 1812, he served in the New York militia in the Plattsburgh campaign. He remained active in the militia after the war, and in 1825 he was commissioned a captain by Governor DeWitt Clinton.

In 1825, Scott was also elected to the New York State Assembly from Genesee County, New York, and served in the 49th New York State Legislature.

Also about 1825, Scott purchased lumber land and milling operations in the township of Bennington, New York, and established a general store on that property—which came to be known as Scottsville. In 1831, he employed Benjamin Folsom to manage his store. Years later, Folsom eventually bought out all of Scott's property in this area, and the area was afterwards known as Folsomdale or Folsomville. Folsom's brother, John, later took over the former Scottsville property, which became the childhood home of his granddaughter, the future first lady Frances Folsom (Cleveland).

After selling his Scottsville property, he continued as a successful merchant in the nearby village of Attica, New York. Scott invested heavily in the economic development of the region, and was responsible for two of the earliest railroads in western New York—a line between from Rochester to Batavia to Attica (later part of the New York Central Railroad) and a line from Attica to Buffalo (later part of the Erie Railroad). Because of his railroad investments, he was the namesake of "Scott Street", a road that still exists near the railroad station in Buffalo, New York. In 1840, he was elected to another term in the New York State Assembly, and served in the 64th New York State Legislature.

In 1849, Scott went west to the new state of Wisconsin, becoming one of the first American settlers at Waupaca, Wisconsin. Waupaca County was formally established by the Wisconsin Legislature in February 1851; at the first election in April 1851, Scott was elected chairman of the county board. Scott was unable to attend the first meeting of the county board in May, however, so Tyler Caldwell was chosen by himself and the other supervisor, Peter Meiklejohn, to serve as chairman in his stead, and Scott would later act simply as a supervisor on the board. In 1851, Waupaca's post office was also established, and Scott was appointed the first postmaster there.

Scott continued serving as postmaster until his health began to fail in 1861, and he was stricken with paralysis. At that time, he moved back to Attica, to reside with his daughter Ellen. He died at Attica on June 5, 1864.

== Personal life and family ==
David Scott was the second child and eldest son among the seven children born to Eli Scott and his wife, Experience. The Scott family were descended from the colonist John Scott, who emigrated from England to the Massachusetts Bay Colony some time before 1659. David's mother, whose maiden name was "Bruce" claimed to be a descendant of Robert the Bruce.

David Scott married Maria Stanton on February 5, 1822. Maria Stanton was the eldest child of Phineas Stanton III, who was chief of staff for Peter Buell Porter during the War of 1812, and campaigned extensively with Porter in the battles about the Niagara Frontier; after the war, Stanton was commissioned a major general in the New York militia.

David and Maria had eight children together, though two died in infancy. They were married for 42 years before Scott's death in 1864.

- Winfield Scott (1823–1906) went to Wisconsin with his father, but remained there after his father's return to New York, becoming a prominent lawyer and judge in Waupaca County.
- Walter Scott (1825–1850) went to study law under Judge John Scott at Warrenton, Virginia, but died there at age 25.
- John David Scott (1834–1890) moved to New Orleans as a young man and went on to serve as an artillery officer in the Confederate States Army, serving with the 1st Louisiana Heavy Artillery. After the war, he prospered in the insurance business, he also later became a colonel in the Louisiana militia and chief of staff to his close friend, militia general John Glynn Jr.
- Jeannie Deans (1837–1920) married Camden C. Dike, a successful wool merchant in New York City. Jeannie was prominent in Brooklyn social life, aided in establishing Brooklyn's Master School of Music, and served as president of the school. Their eldest son, Norman S. Dike, went on to become a prominent lawyer and judge in Brooklyn.
- Thomas Scott (1842–1932) became a successful wool merchant in partnership with his in-laws, the Dike brothers, until retiring in 1891. He traveled extensively in Europe to negotiate his wool trade, and became influential in the evaluation of the wool duties in the 1890 McKinley tariffs, and ultimately shaping the 1897 Dingley tariffs.

Wisconsin State Assembly
Preceded by John B. Jacobs	Member of the Wisconsin State Assembly from the Oconto–Outagamie–Waupaca district January 14, 1854 – January 7, 1856	Succeeded by William Brunquest
