= William F. Tisch =

American politician

William F. Tisch (November 17, 1838 – September 8, 1877) was an American miller and politician.

Tisch was born in Eutin, Grand Duchy of Oldenburg. He emigrated to the United States in 1851, Tisch lived in Williamsburg, New York City, New York and Paterson, New Jersey. Tisch eventually settled in the town of Mishicot, Manitowoc County, Wisconsin in 1854. Tisch was a miller. He served as chairman of the town of Mishicot in 1872 and was a Democrat. Tisch served in the Wisconsin Assembly in 1876. Tisch killed himself with a firearm in Mishicot.
