= Nicholas H. Terens =

American politician

Nicholas H. Terens (July 8, 1864 – February 23, 1943) was an American politician and businessman.

Born in the village of Mishicot, Wisconsin, Terens worked in the hardware business in Mishicot. He served on the school board as president and was a Republican. In 1903, Terens served in the Wisconsin State Assembly. Terens then moved to Manitowoc, Wisconsin and was manager of a duck farm. He then continued work with the hardware business in Manitowoc. Terens died in a hospital in Manitowoc, Wisconsin.
