= Mishicot (town), Wisconsin =

Mishicot, Wisconsin
- Town
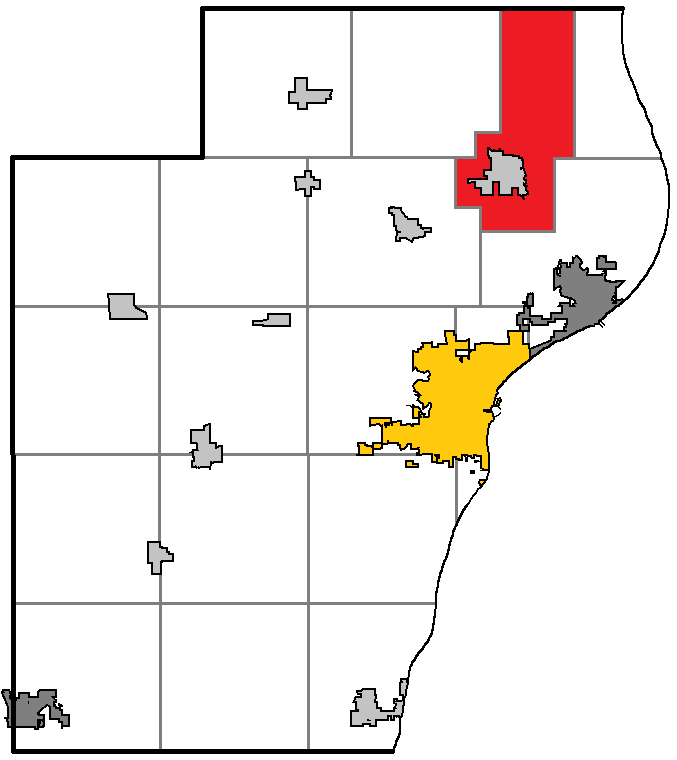
- Location of Mishicot, within Manitowoc County
- Coordinates: 44°16′N 87°37′W
- Country: United States
- State: Wisconsin
- County: Manitowoc
- Established: 1847

Area
  - Total: 27.6 sq mi (71.6 km^{2})
  - Land: 27.6 sq mi (71.6 km^{2})
  - Water: 0.039 sq mi (0.1 km^{2})
- Elevation: 627 ft (191 m)

Population (2020)
  - Total: 1,327
  - Density: 48.0/sq mi (18.5/km^{2})
- Time zone: UTC-6 (Central (CST))
  - Summer (DST): UTC-5 (CDT)
- ZIP code: 54228
- Area code: 920
- FIPS code: 55-53350
- GNIS feature ID: 1583731
- Website: www.townofmishicot.org

Mishicot is a town in Manitowoc County, Wisconsin, United States. The population was 1,327 at the 2020 census. The Village of Mishicot is located within the town. The unincorporated communities of Fisherville, Kingsbridge, and Tisch Mills are also located partially in the town.

== Geography ==
According to the United States Census Bureau, the town has a total area of 27.6 square miles (71.6 km^{2}), of which 27.6 square miles (71.6 km^{2}) is land and 0.04 square miles (0.1 km^{2}) (0.07%) is water.

== Demographics ==
As of the census of 2000, there were 1,409 people, 474 households, and 383 families residing in the town. The population density was 51.0 people per square mile (19.7/km^{2}). There were 489 housing units at an average density of 17.7 per square mile (6.8/km^{2}). The racial makeup of the town was 97.87% White, 0.14% Black or African American, 0.14% Native American, 0.21% Asian, 0.78% from other races, and 0.85% from two or more races. Hispanic or Latino people of any race were 1.77% of the population.

There were 474 households, out of which 42.2% had children under the age of 18 living with them, 72.6% were married couples living together, 3.8% had a female householder with no husband present, and 19.0% were non-families. 15.0% of all households were made up of individuals, and 4.4% had someone living alone who was 65 years of age or older. The average household size was 2.97 and the average family size was 3.32.

In the town, the population was spread out, with 31.1% under the age of 18, 6.1% from 18 to 24, 30.2% from 25 to 44, 23.4% from 45 to 64, and 9.2% who were 65 years of age or older. The median age was 36 years. For every 100 females, there were 106.6 males. For every 100 females age 18 and over, there were 108.4 males.

The median income for a household in the town was $51,083, and the median income for a family was $55,682. Males had a median income of $36,051 versus $25,313 for females. The per capita income for the town was $17,879. About 6.1% of families and 8.1% of the population were below the poverty line, including 10.4% of those under age 18 and 8.1% of those age 65 or over.

== Notable people ==
- Anton G. Schauer, Wisconsin State Representative, was born in the town
- Ira P. Smith, Wisconsin State Representative, lived in the town
- Charles Tisch, Wisconsin State Representative, lived in the town
- William F. Tisch, Wisconsin State Representative, lived in the town
