= Curran, Kewaunee County, Wisconsin =

Curran, Wisconsin
- Unincorporated community
- Location within Wisconsin Location within the United States
- Coordinates: 44°21′22″N 87°44′44″W
- Country: United States
- State: Wisconsin
- County: Kewaunee
- Town: Franklin
- Elevation: 751 ft (229 m)
- Time zone: UTC-6 (Central (CST))
  - Summer (DST): UTC-5 (CDT)
- Area code: 920
- GNIS feature ID: 1577563

Curran is an unincorporated community in the town of Franklin, Kewaunee County, Wisconsin, United States. It is at the junction of County Highways V and KB, 4 miles (6 km) east of the village of Denmark.
