= Ira P. Smith =

American businessman and politician

Ira P. Smith (April 6, 1832 – July 27, 1904) was an American businessman and politician.

== Biography ==
Born in Rochester, New York, Smith moved to Two Rivers, Manitowoc County, Wisconsin Territory, in 1844 and went to the public schools. He then moved to the town of Mishicot and was in the lumber business. He served as chairman of the Mishicot Town Board. Smith served as sheriff of Manitowoc County from 1862 to 1864 and was a Democrat. In 1881, he served in the Wisconsin State Assembly. Smith died of heart failure, at a hospital. in Milwaukee, Wisconsin while visiting a son.
