= Raymond J. Scheuer =

American politician and businessman

Raymond J. Scheuer (November 8, 1887 – June 7, 1939) was an American politician and businessman.

Born in Mishicot, Wisconsin, Scheuer served in the United States Army during World War I. He worked in his family's brewery business, as the business manager, in Mishicot, Wisconsin. After the war, he worked in the automobile business in Manitowoc, Wisconsin and then in the loans and investment business. In 1933, Scheuer served in the Wisconsin State Assembly and was a Democrat, Then in 1934, Scheuer ran for the Wisconsin State Senate and lost the election. He died in Manitowoc, Wisconsin of a heart attack.
