= Joseph M. Mleziva =

American politician

Joseph Mathias Mleziva (January 22, 1890 – December 27, 1968) was an American farmer from Luxemburg, Wisconsin who served eight years as a Republican member of the Wisconsin State Assembly, and held various local offices.

== Background ==
Mleziva was born on January 22, 1890, in Montpelier, Wisconsin. He attended local public schools and Green Bay Business College. He spent six years in Chicago working for various major companies, and studying at North Chicago Business College and taking night school at Lewis Institute, Crane Technical High School, and Northwestern University's School of Commerce. On September 6, 1914, he married Elizabeth Jicha in Chicago. Upon his father's death in 1915 he returned to operate the family farm in Luxemburg. By the time of his election to the legislature, he had served as president of the Kewaunee County Pure-Bred Seed Growers Association, manager and treasurer of the Luxemburg Livestock Shipping Association, a director of the Green Bay Production Credit Association, a U. S. and Wisconsin crop reporter, and a committeeman and farm reporter for the Agricultural Soil Conservation Program.

== Public office ==
Mleziva served six years as county treasurer of Kewaunee County, four years as town treasurer, and three years as treasurer of his school district. He first ran for the Assembly's Kewaunee County seat in 1932, as the Republican nominee; he received 2,170 votes to 3,663 for Democrat Albert D. Shimek and 105 for Democratic incumbent Jacob Blahnik (who had lost a bid for Congress). He was elected to the Assembly in 1940, with 3,447 votes to Shimek's 3,201. He was assigned to the standing committees on agriculture and on state affairs. He was unopposed for re-election in 1942, remaining on the agriculture committee but being moved to the committee on taxation. In 1944, he defeated Democratic challenger Anton Gotstein, with 3,673 votes to Gotstein's 2,758. He remained on agriculture and taxation, and was also assigned to a joint investigative committee on personal property taxes. In 1946, he beat Democratic nominee Arnold Chada 2,892 to 2,551. He remained on the joint committee, but left the other two and became chairman of the committee on contingent expenditures. He was not a candidate for re-election in 1948, announcing, "I can't afford to continue and, besides, I'm tired of taking the abuse that comes with the job," He was succeeded by fellow Republican Julius Stangel.

== After the legislature ==
He was a director of the Bank of Luxemburg for many years. In mid-1966, he retired and moved to Green Bay, where he died December 27, 1968, survived by his wife and four children.
