= John Carel =

19th century American politician

John Karel

Member of the Wisconsin State Assembly from the Kewaunee County district
- In office January 6, 1879 – January 5, 1880
- Preceded by: Charles Tisch
- Succeeded by: Joseph E. Darbellay

Personal details
- Born: March 29, 1851 Nemecká, Zólyom County, Kingdom of Hungary
- Died: August 23, 1914 (aged 63) Minneapolis, Minnesota, U.S.
- Resting place: Riverview Public Cemetery, Kewaunee, Wisconsin, U.S.
- Party: Democratic
- Spouse: Elizabeth Metzner (m. 1871; died 1883)
- Children: John C. Karel Jr.^{(b. 1873; died 1938)}; L. Albert Karel^{(b. 1875; died 1965)}; Flora Mae (Templeton)^{(b. 1877; died 1978)}
- Education: Plzeň Gymnasium
- Occupation: Banker, diplomat

John C. Karel Sr. (or Carel) (Note: The 1879 and 1881 Wisconsin Blue Books spell his last name "Carel", but all later coverage, including his gravestone and his son's gubernatorial campaign, spell it "Karel".) (March 29, 1851 – August 23, 1914) was an Austrian Empire born American banker, and Democratic politician. He was a member of the Wisconsin State Assembly, representing Kewaunee County during the 1879 session. During the presidency of Grover Cleveland, he served as U.S. consul at Prague and Saint Petersburg.

== Biography ==
John Karel was born in March 1851, in the village of Nemecká, in what was then Zólyom County in the Austrian Empire—the area is now central Slovakia. His early life was spent in Prague and Plzeň, and he received a collegiate education at the Plzeň Gymnasium. He emigrated to the United States and settled in Kewaunee, Wisconsin, in 1868.

He served as chairman of the Kewaunee County Board of Supervisors and was elected to the Wisconsin State Assembly in 1878, running on the Democratic Party ticket. He ran for the Wisconsin State Senate in 1880, but was defeated by Republican William A. Ellis.

Karel was the Democratic nominee for the statewide elected office of Wisconsin Insurance Commissioner in the 1886 general election. He was defeated along with the entire Democratic ticket. A month after his election loss, he accepted appointment as vice-consul to Prague, in Austria-Hungary, under U.S. consul-general Charles Jonas. He remained in office through the end of U.S. President Grover Cleveland's first term, in 1889, and afterward moved to Chicago, Illinois.

In Chicago he was a partner in a banking business known as Kasper & Karel, which was considered the leading banking institution for Bohemian American merchants in Chicago. When Grover Cleveland returned to office in 1893, Karel was re-appointed to the consulate in Prague, and then, in 1894, he was appointed consul-general at Saint Petersburg, which was then the capital of the Russian Empire.

After returning from his diplomatic missions, he resumed his interest in banking and was one of the founders of the American State Bank in Chicago, where he served as president until his retirement.

He retired due to poor health about 1912. His health continued to decline and he went to live with his daughter, Flora, in Minneapolis, Minnesota. He died there on August 23, 1914.

== Personal life and family ==
John Karel married Elizabeth Metzner in 1871. They had at least three children before her death in 1883. Their eldest son, John C. Karel, Jr., was a member of the Wisconsin State Assembly, a county judge in Milwaukee County, Wisconsin, and the Democratic nominee for Governor of Wisconsin in 1912 and 1914.

== Electoral history ==
=== Wisconsin Assembly (1878) ===
Wisconsin Assembly, Kewaunee District Election, 1878
| Party | Candidate | Votes | % | ±% |
|---|---|---|---|---|
General Election, November 5, 1878
| Democratic | John Carel | 1,783 | 81.79% | |
| Republican | Edward Wyman | 397 | 18.21% | |
| Plurality | | 1,386 | 63.58% | |
| Total votes | | 2,180 | 100.0% | +151.15% |
| Democratic hold | | | | |

=== Wisconsin Senate (1880) ===
Wisconsin Senate, 1st District Election, 1880
| Party | Candidate | Votes | % | ±% |
|---|---|---|---|---|
General Election, November 2, 1880
| Republican | William A. Ellis | 5,869 | 58.36% | +5.01% |
| Democratic | John Carel | 4,188 | 41.64% | |
| Plurality | | 1,681 | 16.71% | +10.01% |
| Total votes | | 10,057 | 100.0% | +40.68% |
| Republican hold | | | | |

=== Wisconsin Insurance Commissioner (1886) ===
Wisconsin Commissioner of Insurance Election, 1886
| Party | Candidate | Votes | % | ±% |
|---|---|---|---|---|
General Election, November 2, 1886
| Republican | Philip Cheek Jr. | 131,140 | 45.84% | −7.03% |
| Democratic | John Karel | 116,358 | 40.67% | −6.46% |
| Populist | Rittner Stephens | 21,305 | 7.45% | |
| Prohibition | B. F. Parker | 17,282 | 6.04% | +3.91% |
| Plurality | | 14,782 | 5.17% | |
| Total votes | | 286,085 | 100.0% | |
| Republican hold | | | | |

== Notes ==
Party political offices
| Preceded by Ole S. Holum | Democratic nominee for Commissioner of Insurance of Wisconsin; 1886 | Succeeded by Evan W. Evans |
Wisconsin State Assembly
| Preceded by Charles Tisch | Member of the Wisconsin State Assembly from the Kewaunee district January 6, 1879 – January 5, 1880 | Succeeded by Joseph E. Darbellay |
