= Charles Tisch =

American politician

Member of the Wisconsin State Assembly from the Kewaunee County district
- In office January 1, 1877 – January 6, 1879
- Preceded by: District established
- Succeeded by: John Carel

Personal details
- Born: 26 May 1829 Eutin, Grand Duchy of Oldenburg, German Confederation
- Died: 10 January 1895 Wausau, Wisconsin, U.S.
- Resting place: Holy Cross Cemetery, Mishicot, Wisconsin
- Party: Democratic
- Occupation: Politician, Businessman

Carl Johann Christian "Charles" Tisch (May 26, 1829 – January 10, 1895) was a German American immigrant, businessman, and Democratic politician from Kewaunee County, Wisconsin. He was the namesake of Tisch Mills, Wisconsin, and represented Kewaunee County for two terms in the Wisconsin State Assembly, during the 1877 and 1878 terms. He earlier served four years as county judge.

== Biography ==
Tisch was born on May 26, 1829, in Eutin, Grand Duchy of Oldenburg, then part of the German Confederation. In 1851, he settled in what is now the town of Mishicot, Wisconsin, in Manitowoc County. There, he built a sawmill and gristmills in the area that would later become Tisch Mills, Wisconsin, named in his honor. On January 10, 1895, Tisch died of blood poisoning in Wausau, Wisconsin.

== Political career ==
Tisch was a member of the Assembly in 1877 and 1878. Other positions he held include County Judge of Kewaunee County, Wisconsin, from 1870 to 1874. He was a Democrat.

Wisconsin State Assembly
District established by 1876 Wisconsin Act 343	Member of the Wisconsin State Assembly from the Kewaunee County district January 1, 1877 – January 6, 1879	Succeeded by John Carel
