= Simon Kahquados =

Native American political activist

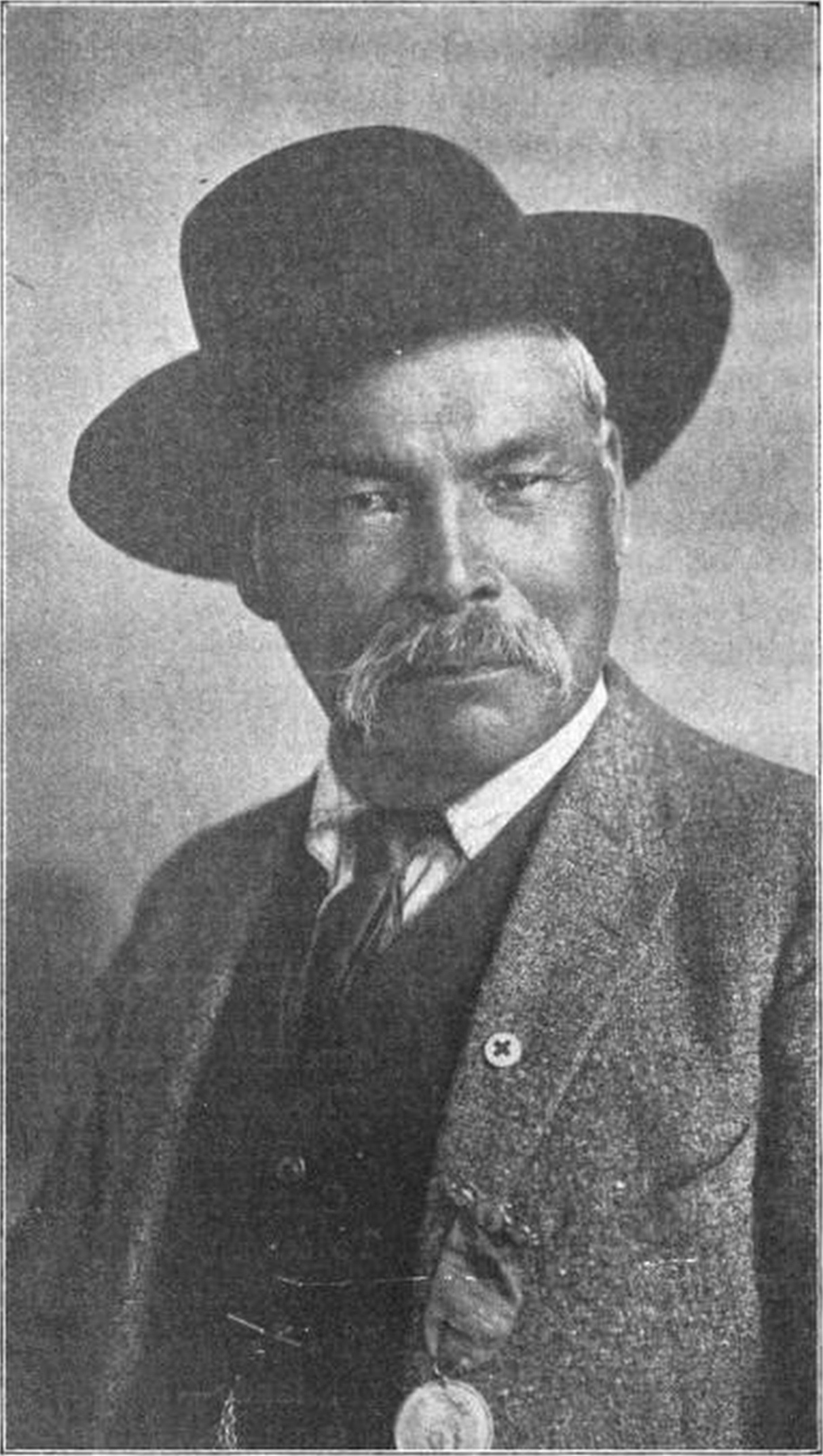
Portrait of Simon Kahquados published in the American Indian Magazine in 1919 (date of photo uncertain)

Simon Kahquados, born Kakanisaiga, (May 18, 1851 – November 27, 1930) was a leader of the Potawatomi people in Wisconsin, United States, and played a pivotal role in creating the federally recognized Forest County Potawatomi Community.

== Biography ==
Simon Kahquados, whose Potawatomi name was Kakanisaiga, was born on May 18, 1851, in Black Earth, a Potawatomi village located in the present-day Town of Carlton, Wisconsin. His father died in 1856, and he was raised by his grandfather near Whitefish Bay, Door County. In 1862, the Potawatomi in Door County and Kewaunee County were forced from their land and became refugees, dividing into small bands and moving to northern Wisconsin and the Upper Peninsula of Michigan. Kahquados was in a band that moved into the Upper Peninsula in 1864, where he hunted and trapped. In 1870, his family bought a homestead in Bark River, Michigan, where he associated with the Hannahville Methodist Indian Mission and worked as a logger in the timber industry.

Unlike Native Americans who had moved west of the Mississippi River, bands of Potawatomi that remained in northern Wisconsin and Michigan did not receive annuities from the United States government. In the early 20th century, Kahquados made several trips to Washington, D.C., to lobby the government to improve conditions for the Potawatomi people and return their land. Although he did not achieve his goal of regaining the land in Kewaunee County where he was born, his actions played a significant role in the organization and federal recognition of the Forest County Potawatomi Community in 1913. In pressing his cause, Kahquados spoke with many historians and scholars and gave speeches at public events, including the Wisconsin State Fair. The information he gave Wisconsin historians and writers continues to be an important source of historical information about Potawatomi culture.

After the establishment of the Forest County Potawatomi Community, Kahquados lived in Marinette County, Wisconsin, before finally settling with a friend in Blackwell, Wisconsin. He spent his final years battling illness and living in poverty on a government annuity of $10 per month. He died on November 27, 1930. Initially buried in northern Wisconsin, his last wishes were to be buried near the grave of his ancestor Chief Onanguisse in Peninsula State Park, Door County, Wisconsin. Over 15,000 people attended his reburial ceremony at the park on May 30, 1931.

== See also ==
- Hjalmar Holand (1872 – 1963), historian and supporter of Kahquados
