= Wisconsin's Oconto–Outagamie–Waupaca Assembly district =

Former American legislative district

Wisconsin's Oconto–Outagamie–Waupaca State Assembly district
- Obsolete
- Notes: 1852–1856

Wisconsin's Oconto–Outagamie–Waupaca Assembly district was a district in the Wisconsin State Assembly in the early years of the history of the state of Wisconsin, prior to the legislative redistricting reforms of 1972 which created the current numbered districts. Located in northeast Wisconsin, the district comprised the whole of Oconto, Outagamie, and Waupaca counties.

The district was in use for elections from 1852 through 1855. For most of the time that this district existed, Oconto County and, thus, this district, was larger than the modern boundaries of Oconto County. Shawano County was formally created from parts of Winnebago and Oconto counties in 1853, though it's boundaries were quite different than it's modern boundaries and continued to shift over the subsequent years of this district's existence, but the entirety of Shawano County remained part of this Assembly district until the 1856 redistricting.

== List of representatives ==
List of representatives from the Oconto–Outagamie–Waupaca district
Member	Party	Residence	Term start	Term end	Leg.
District created
Arthur Resley	Dem.	Appleton	January 3, 1853	January 2, 1854	6th
John B. Jacobs	Dem.	Menomonee	January 2, 1854	January 14, 1854	7th
David Scott	Dem.	Waupaca	January 14, 1854	January 1, 1855	7th
Perry H. Smith	Dem.	Appleton	January 1, 1855	January 7, 1856	8th
William Brunquest	Rep.	Waupaca	January 7, 1856	January 15, 1856	9th
Louis Bostedo	Dem.	Weyauwega	January 15, 1856	January 5, 1857	9th
District abolished by 1856 Wisconsin Act 109; Outagamie County became a single-county Assembly district Waupaca County became a single-county Assembly district Oconto and Shawano counties became part of the Door–Kewaunee–Oconto–Shawano district
