= Forest County Potawatomi Community =

Coordinates: 45.5689°N 88.8429°W

Forest County Potawatomi
Ksenyaniyêk or Gsenyaniyêk

Total population
- 1,400 (2010)

Regions with significant populations
- United States (Wisconsin)

Languages
- English, Potawatomi

Related ethnic groups
- other Potawatomi and Anishinaabe people

Location of the Forest County Potawatomi Indian Reservation in Wisconsin

The Forest County Potawatomi Community (Potawatomi: Gsenyaniyêk or Ksenyaniyek) is a federally recognized tribe of Potawatomi people with approximately 1,400 members as of 2010. The community is based on the Forest County Potawatomi Indian Reservation, which consists of numerous non-contiguous plots of land in southern Forest County and northern Oconto County, Wisconsin, United States. The community also administers about 7 acres (28,000 m^{2}) of off-reservation trust land in the city of Milwaukee. According to the U.S. Census Bureau, the reservation and off-reservation trust land together have a total area of 22.72 square miles (58.8 km^{2}). The combined population of Forest County Potawatomi Community and Off-Reservation Trust Land was 594 in the 2020 census. The nation's administrative and cultural center are located about three miles east of Crandon, Wisconsin.

== Tribal ventures ==
=== Casinos ===
The Forest County Potawatomi run the Potawatomi Hotel & Casino in Milwaukee and the Potawatomi Bingo Northern Lights Casino in Carter, Wisconsin.

=== Crandon Mine ===
Along with the Sokaogon Chippewa Community, the Potawatomi bought the nearby Crandon mine in Crandon to prevent its reopening. The tribes argued the reopening of the zinc and copper mine would harm the environment.

=== Forest County Potawatomi Cultural Center and Museum ===
The Forest County Potawatomi Cultural Center and Museum were created to educate the public and pass the culture and traditions of the Potawatomi people to the next generations. The Cultural Center is a new way of gathering the people — to share stories and to learn from one another. The Forest County Potawatomi Community welcomes Native Americans and non-Native Americans alike to learn about the community and their contributions. With input from community elders and internationally known museum designers, many unique, informative and entertaining exhibits were constructed and are now captivating general public visitors. The 2,700-square-foot (250 m^{2}) permanent exhibit, which is bilingual (Potawatomi and English), is divided into four main sections: a history of the Potawatomi, entitled The Long Walk; an interactive kiosk, entitled People Who Share a Language; a display of different traditional elements, entitled Traditional Ways; and a display of the heritage of the present day tribe. Other highlights of the exhibit include: "People of the Three Fires" main diorama-recreation of the Council of Three Fires is located in the center of the exhibition. "The Gathering": video presentation of the various Potawatomi communities across North America. "The Wall of Treaties"—reproductions of 43 United States and seven Canadian treaties conducted with the Potawatomi. "Wigwas Tthiman" (Birchbark Canoe)—this birchbark canoe was constructed on site at the Potawatomi Cultural Center and Museum using traditional methods as a living display. The canoe project took five weeks to complete and visitors were able to watch each step of the process. "Living History/Craft Classes"—Community instructional classes such as: moccasin, flute, dance regalia, scale model canoe building, language classes, birch/quill and black ash basketry are offered throughout the year.

== See also ==
- Black Earth, Wisconsin (Potawatomi village)
- Sugarbush Hill
