= Stangelville, Wisconsin =

- Unincorporated community
- Location within Wisconsin Location within the United States
- Coordinates: 44°24′01″N 87°41′04″W
- Country: United States
- State: Wisconsin
- County: Kewaunee
- Town: Franklin
- Elevation: 807 ft (246 m)
- Time zone: UTC-6 (Central (CST))
  - Summer (DST): UTC-5 (CDT)
- Area code: 920
- GNIS feature ID: 1574789

Stangelville is an unincorporated community in the town of Franklin, Kewaunee County, Wisconsin, United States. Stangelville is located at the junction of County Highways AB and J, 9.5 miles (15.3 km) west-southwest of Kewaunee. St. Lawrence Catholic Church, which is listed on the National Register of Historic Places, is in Stangelville. The community was founded by immigrants from the western and southern parts of Bohemia in the Austrian Empire.

In 1887, the US Post Office moved the post office for the Town of Franklin to this growing community. Joseph N. Tikalsky was named the first postmaster of the new office. When Joseph Tikalsky died a year later, his wife, Francis Tikalsky was named postmaster. During the following year it was determined that there was another community in Wisconsin named Franklin, so the post office was renamed Stangelville for the US Postal Service. The name recognized Martin Stangl, one of the earliest Bohemian settlers in the area.

In 1894, the community build a gothic Catholic Church, St. Lawrence Catholic Church, with a 150 foot tall steeple that can be seen for many miles. The Konop Hotel, Tikalsky general store and Cheese Factory, John Mach's Saloon, and St. Lawrence Church occupied each corner of the rural intersection which was at the center of the community. The town also had a harness maker, Pelnar's Blacksmith Shop, and Konop's slaughterhouse and butcher. All the original residents were from Bohemia.
