= James F. Hughes =

20th century American politician (1883–1940)

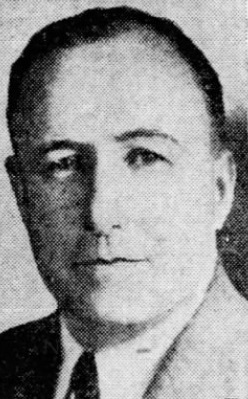
- The Capital Times (Madison, WI), Aug. 10, 1940

Member of the U.S. House of Representatives from Wisconsin's 8th district
- In office March 4, 1933 – January 3, 1935
- Preceded by: Gerald J. Boileau
- Succeeded by: George J. Schneider

Personal details
- Born: August 7, 1883 Green Bay, Wisconsin, U.S.
- Died: August 9, 1940 (aged 57) Rochester, Minnesota, U.S.
- Resting place: Cady Cemetery, Lawrence, Brown County, Wisconsin
- Party: Democratic
- Spouse: Emma Louise Adams (m. 1913–1940)
- Children: James Adams Hughes; (b. 1914; died 1981)
- Occupation: Salesman, politician

James Frederic Hughes (August 7, 1883 – August 9, 1940) was an American salesman and Democratic politician from De Pere, Wisconsin. He served one term in the U.S. House of Representatives, representing Wisconsin's 8th congressional district during the 73rd Congress (1933–1935). He retired after one term due to chronic illness.

== Early life and career ==
James Hughes was born in Green Bay, Wisconsin, in August 1883. He was raised and educated in Green Bay, graduating from Green Bay West High School (then McCartney School) in 1901. He went to work for his father, who was a foundry and machine shop superintendent. After many years working with his father, in 1915 he was hired as a traveling salesman for F. B. Stevens Inc., a Detroit manufacturer of foundry supplies. This was his primary employment for much of the rest of his life.

== Political career ==
Around that time, Hughes also settled in De Pere, Wisconsin. He became active in politics and civic affairs in De Pere. He served 12 years as a member of the public library board and served 18 years as a member of the West De Pere school commission, from 1914 to 1937, during which time the Old Nicolet High School was approved and constructed. According to his obituary, Hughes was also an advocate for musical instruction in the schools, and attended many of the school musical performances and competitions.

He was a member of the central committee of the Democratic Party of Wisconsin from 1920 to 1924. He was elected as a delegate to the 1920 and 1928 Democratic National Conventions, and attended the 1932 Democratic National Convention without official delegate status.

Wisconsin's 8th congressional district 1932–1963

In June 1932, Hughes received the unanimous approval of Wisconsin's 8th congressional district Democratic convention to serve as their nominee for U.S. House of Representatives that year. Despite the convention's endorsement, Hughes still faced a primary election against state representative Jacob J. Blahnik and a third candidate, William Wright. Hughes won the primary and went on to face Republican incumbent George J. Schneider in the general election. Schneider had faced no opponent in 1930 and won his 1928 election with 60% of the vote. Hughes campaigned vigorously around the district in 1932, running on Franklin D. Roosevelt's New Deal proposals. In November, Hughes narrowly defeated Schneider, receiving 50.7% of the vote.

Hughes served in the 73rd Congress (March 4, 1933 – January 3, 1935), during which he supported much of Roosevelt's agenda. He also obtained a $650,000 appropriation for a new federal building in Green Bay. In June 1934, Hughes again received the unanimous support of the 8th district Democratic convention, but Hughes surprised his constituents by declining to run for re-election. Separately, there was a hope among stalwart Republicans that Hughes would run for U.S. Senate against Progressive Party incumbent Robert M. La Follette Jr., and split the pro-Roosevelt vote, but Hughes also declined to run for Senate. Hughes explained that he suffered from a chronic illness and his physician had advised him to drop out of electoral politics for the good of his health.

== Later years ==
Shortly after leaving office, Hughes was hospitalized and submitted to the amputation of his leg due to disease. He recovered from his surgery and was able to resume some of his civic duties through the late 1930s.

Hughes became severely ill again in 1940, and was admitted to the Mayo Clinic in Rochester, Minnesota, in June of that year. After two months, he submitted to the amputation of his other leg, but his condition continued to decline. He died at St. Mary's Hospital in Rochester on August 9, 1940. He was buried at Cady Cemetery, in the town of Lawrence, just outside of West De Pere.

== Personal life and family ==
James F. Hughes was the third of six children born to James V. Hughes and his wife Emma (née Leicht). Both of Hughes parents died during the year of his campaign for Congress, 1932. The Hughes family were Catholics.

James F. Hughes married Emma Louise Adams of De Pere in 1913. They had one child.

Their son, James Adams Hughes, graduated from Nicolet High School and went on to become a lawyer. Like his father, he served on the West De Pere School Board and served in several other civic offices in De Pere. During World War II, he served as a supply officer aboard the USS Neshanic in the Pacific War. After the war, he was in charge of dairy product procurement for Safeway for much of the rest of his life.

Aside from his political and civic interests, James F. Hughes was described as an ardent student of history.

== Electoral history ==
=== U.S. House (1932) ===
Wisconsin's 8th Congressional District Election, 1932
Party	Candidate	Votes	%	±%
Democratic Primary, September 20, 1932
Democratic	James F. Hughes			
Democratic	Jacob J. Blahnik			
Democratic	William Wright			
Total votes				
General Election, November 8, 1932
Democratic	James F. Hughes	53,414	50.73%	+29.85pp
Republican	George J. Schneider	51,887	49.27%	
Plurality		1,527	1.45%	-56.80pp
Total votes		105,301	100.0%	+177.31%
Democratic gain from Republican		Swing	59.70pp	

U.S. House of Representatives
Preceded by Gerald J. Boileau	Member of the U.S. House of Representatives from Wisconsin's 8th congressional district March 4, 1933 - January 3, 1935	Succeeded by George J. Schneider
