= Antonio F. Vachris =

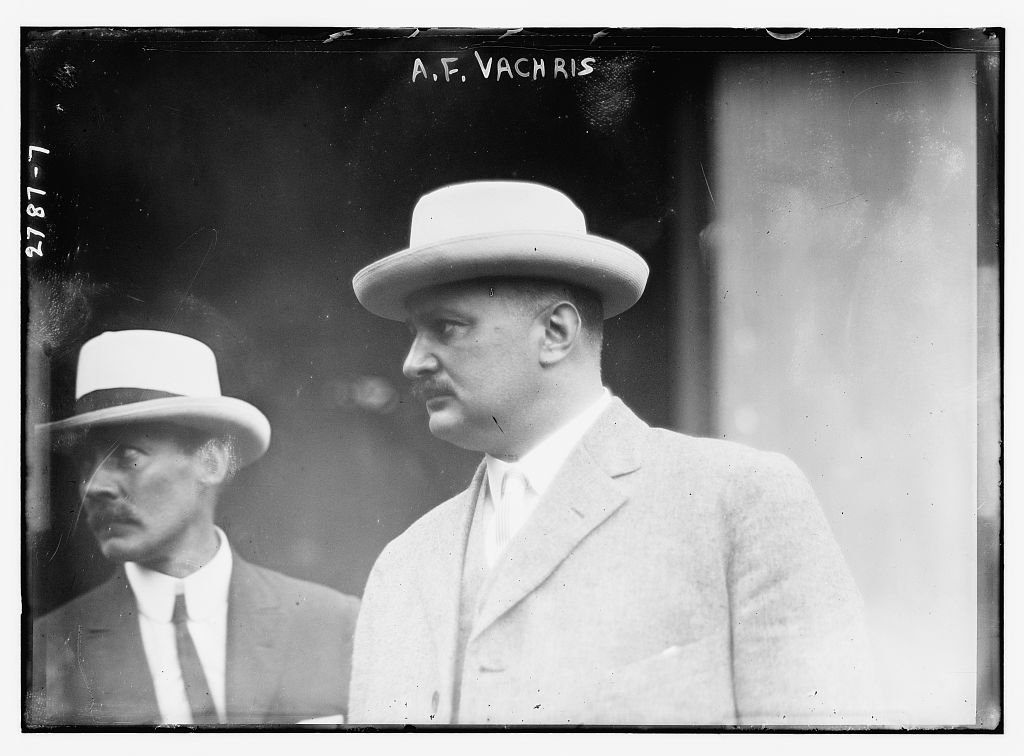

Antonio F. Vachris (1866–1944) was an Italian-American police officer on Coney Island who headed the Italian Branch of the New York City Police Department.

== Biography ==
He was born in June 1866 in France to Italian parents. He was an active prosecutor, and, in 1908, received a death threat in a letter addressed to him and Brooklyn judge Norman Staunton Dike from the "Black Hand", a terrorist group. He solved the Michael Scimeca kidnapping case in 1910. His predecessor, Lieutenant Joseph Petrosino, was murdered in Sicily in 1909, and Vachris had to go to Palermo to retrieve Petrosino's list of Italian criminals operating in the United States. Vachris was also involved in policing adult entertainment on Coney Island.
