= Bill Jorgenson =

American singer-songwriter (1930–2007)

- Born: December 22, 1930; Ahnapee, Wisconsin, U.S.
- Died: February 5, 2007 (aged 76)
- Genres: Bluegrass music
- Occupation: Musician

Bill Jorgenson (December 22, 1930 – February 5, 2007) was an American bluegrass musician. He was born in Ahnapee, Wisconsin, and grew up in nearby Door County, Wisconsin USA. He was primarily noted for being the Father of Wisconsin Bluegrass, a title given to him by Bill Monroe.

Jorgenson began playing the guitar after listening to the WLS National Barn Dance on the radio. He switched from traditional country music to bluegrass while in basic training in the United States Army. After he returned to Door County, he began performing in Milwaukee. He was once the opening act for Johnny Cash and June Carter Cash at the Milwaukee Auditorium, and briefly had his own local television show.

He launched the Glenmore Opera House, and started the Heritage Farm Bluegrass Festival. He regularly performed free performances at elementary schools in northeast Wisconsin. Jorgenson performed for 65 years. In 1998 he was inducted to America's Old-Time Country Music Hall Of Fame. Late in his career he began releasing his music on CDs. In 2001 he released the CDs Amberlee, The Father of Wisconsin Bluegrass, and Bluegrass in the Northwoods.

He died on February 5, 2007, days after suffering a massive stroke.
