= Tisch Mills, Wisconsin =

- Unincorporated community
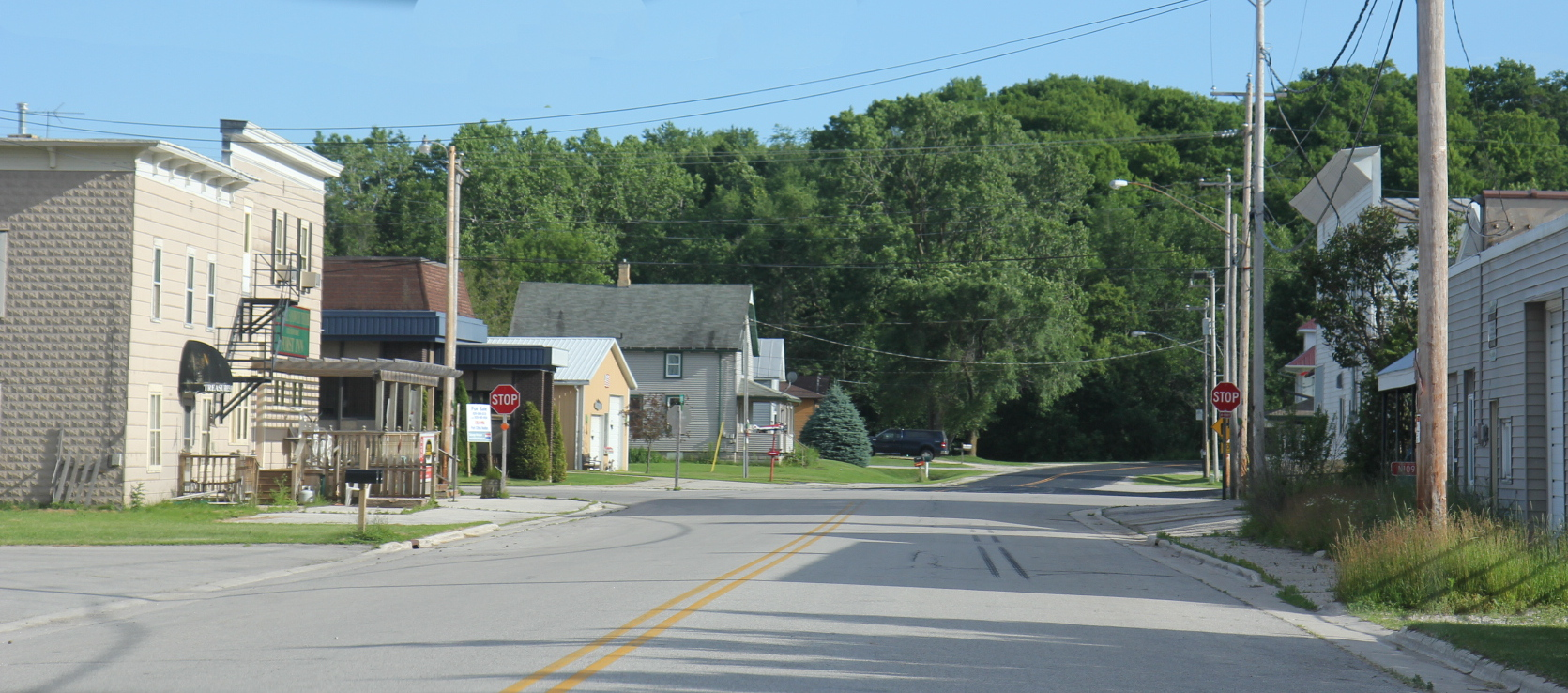
- Looking south at the main intersection in Tisch Mills

- Location within Wisconsin Location within the United States
- Coordinates: 44°19′38″N 87°37′25″W
- Country: United States
- State: Wisconsin
- Counties: Kewaunee, Manitowoc
- Towns: Carlton, Mishicot
- Elevation: 636 ft (194 m)
- Time zone: UTC-6 (Central (CST))
  - Summer (DST): UTC-5 (CDT)
- ZIP code: 54240
- Area code: 920
- GNIS feature ID: 1575472

Tisch Mills (/ˈtɪʃ/ TISH) is an unincorporated community in Kewaunee and Manitowoc counties, Wisconsin, United States. Tisch Mills is located in the towns of Carlton in Kewaunee County and Mishicot in Manitowoc County, 5 miles (8 km) north of the village of Mishicot. It is at an elevation of 636 feet (194 m) above sea level.

== History ==
The community is named after Charles Tisch.

== Volunteer fire department ==
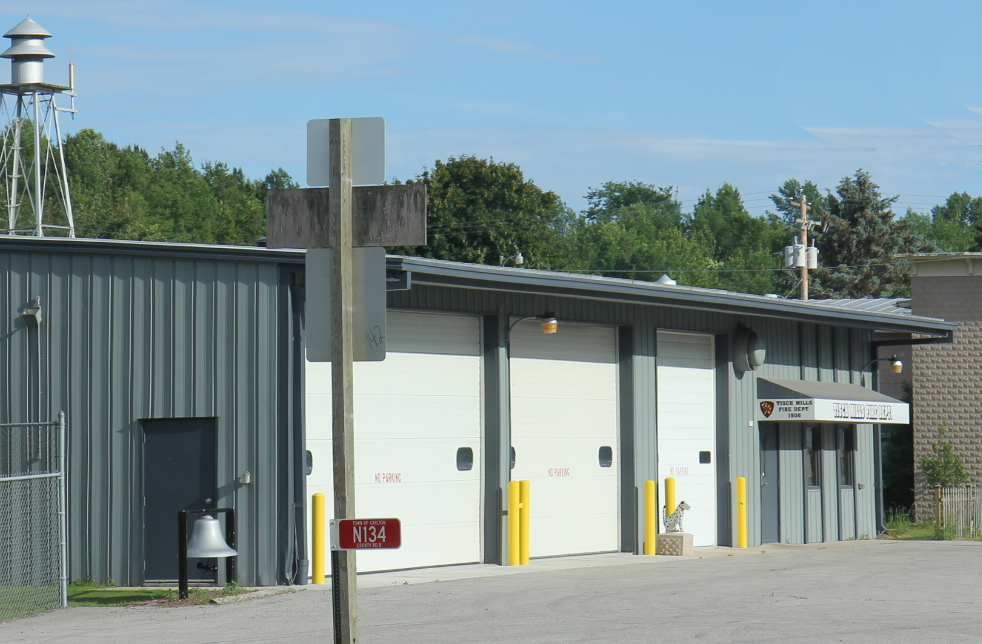
Fire department

Tisch Mills is served by a volunteer fire department.

== Religion ==
St. Isidore the Farmer Parish in the community is part of the Roman Catholic Diocese of Green Bay.

== Notable people ==
- Anton Holly, Wisconsin State Assemblyman and farmer; owned a meat market in Tisch Mills
- Anton G. Schauer, Wisconsin State Assemblyman, farmer, educator, and businessman; lived in Tisch Mills

== Images ==
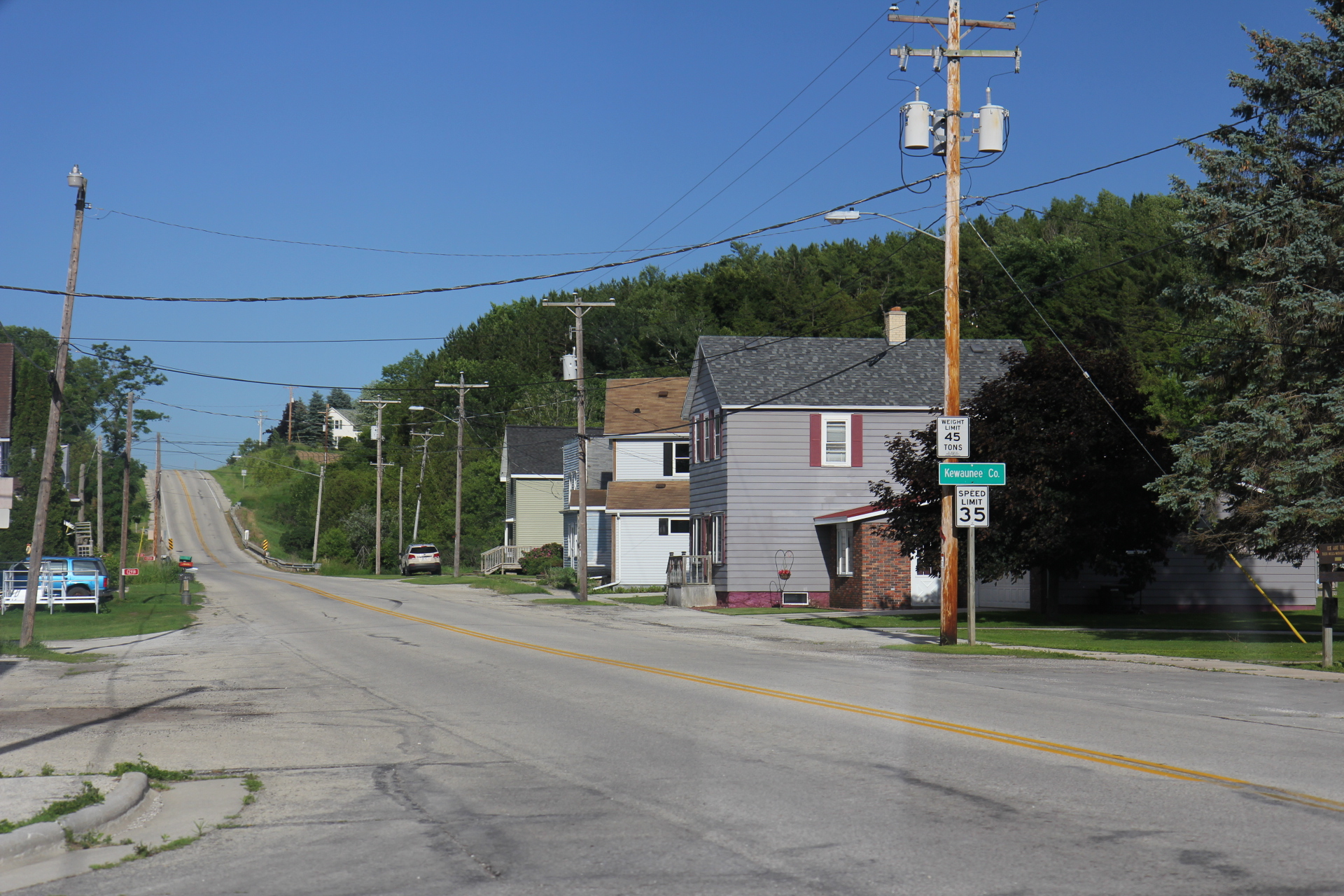
Kewaunee County sign in Tisch Mills

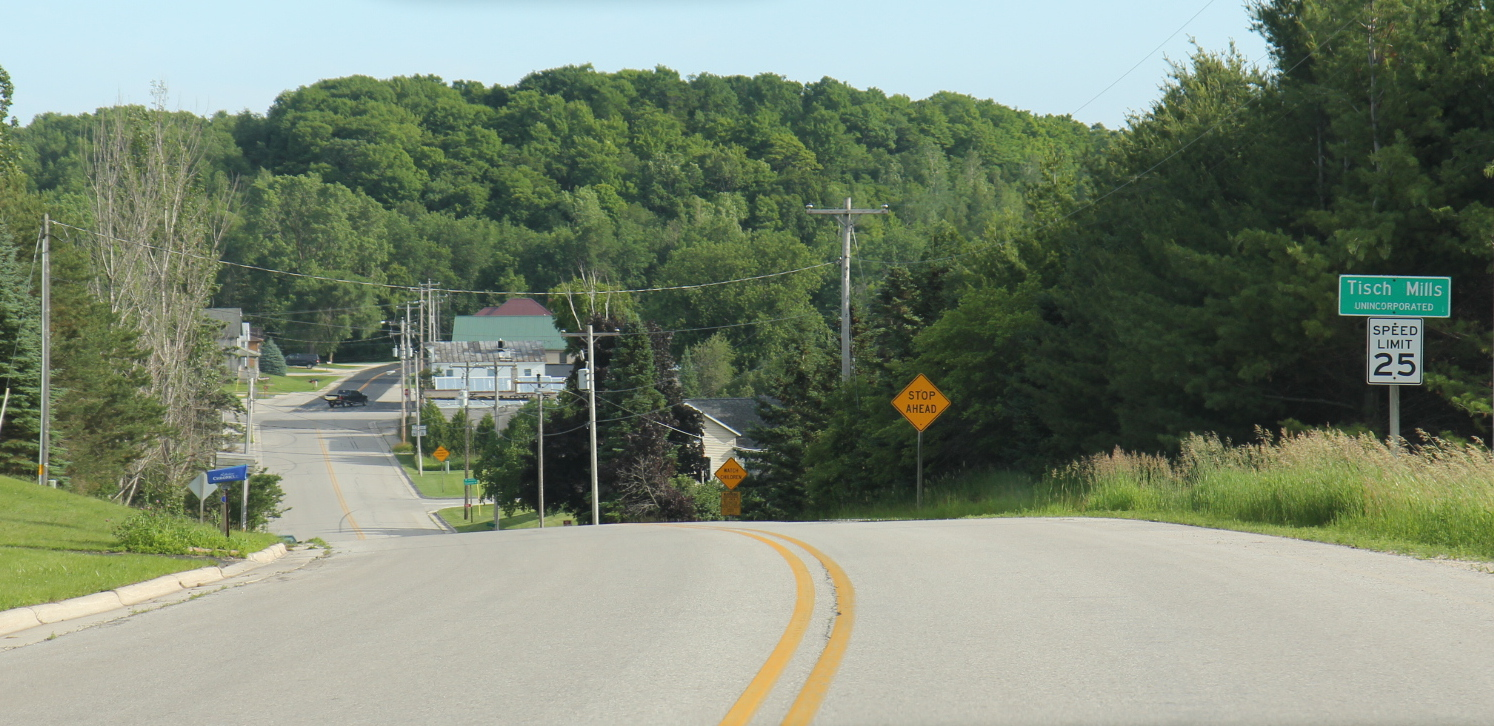
Looking south at the sign for Tisch Mills
