= Mishicot, Wisconsin =

- Village
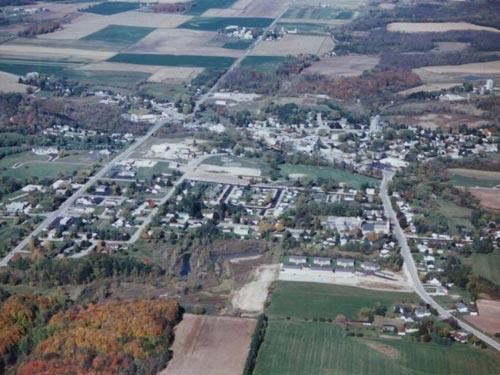
- Mishicot from the air

- Location of Mishicot in Manitowoc County, Wisconsin
- Coordinates: 44°14′17″N 87°38′28″W
- Country: United States
- State: Wisconsin
- County: Manitowoc
- Established: 1847

Area
  - Total: 2.60 sq mi (6.73 km^{2})
  - Land: 2.55 sq mi (6.61 km^{2})
  - Water: 0.050 sq mi (0.13 km^{2})
- Elevation: 627 ft (191 m)

Population (2020)
  - Total: 1,432
  - Density: 561/sq mi (217/km^{2})
- Time zone: UTC-6 (Central (CST))
  - Summer (DST): UTC-5 (CDT)
- ZIP code: 54228
- Area code: 920
- FIPS code: 55-53350
- GNIS feature ID: 1583731
- Website: www.mishicot.org

Mishicot is a village in Manitowoc County, Wisconsin, United States. The population was 1,432 at the 2020 census. The village is adjacent to the Town of Mishicot.

== History ==
This area of Wisconsin was originally occupied by the Menominee, Potawatomi and Ho-Chunk peoples. By the end of French rule over the area in 1763, the Potawatomi had begun a move to the Detroit area, leaving the large communities in Wisconsin. Later, some Potawatomi moved back from Michigan to northern Wisconsin. Some but not all Potawatomi later left northern Wisconsin for northern Indiana and central Illinois.

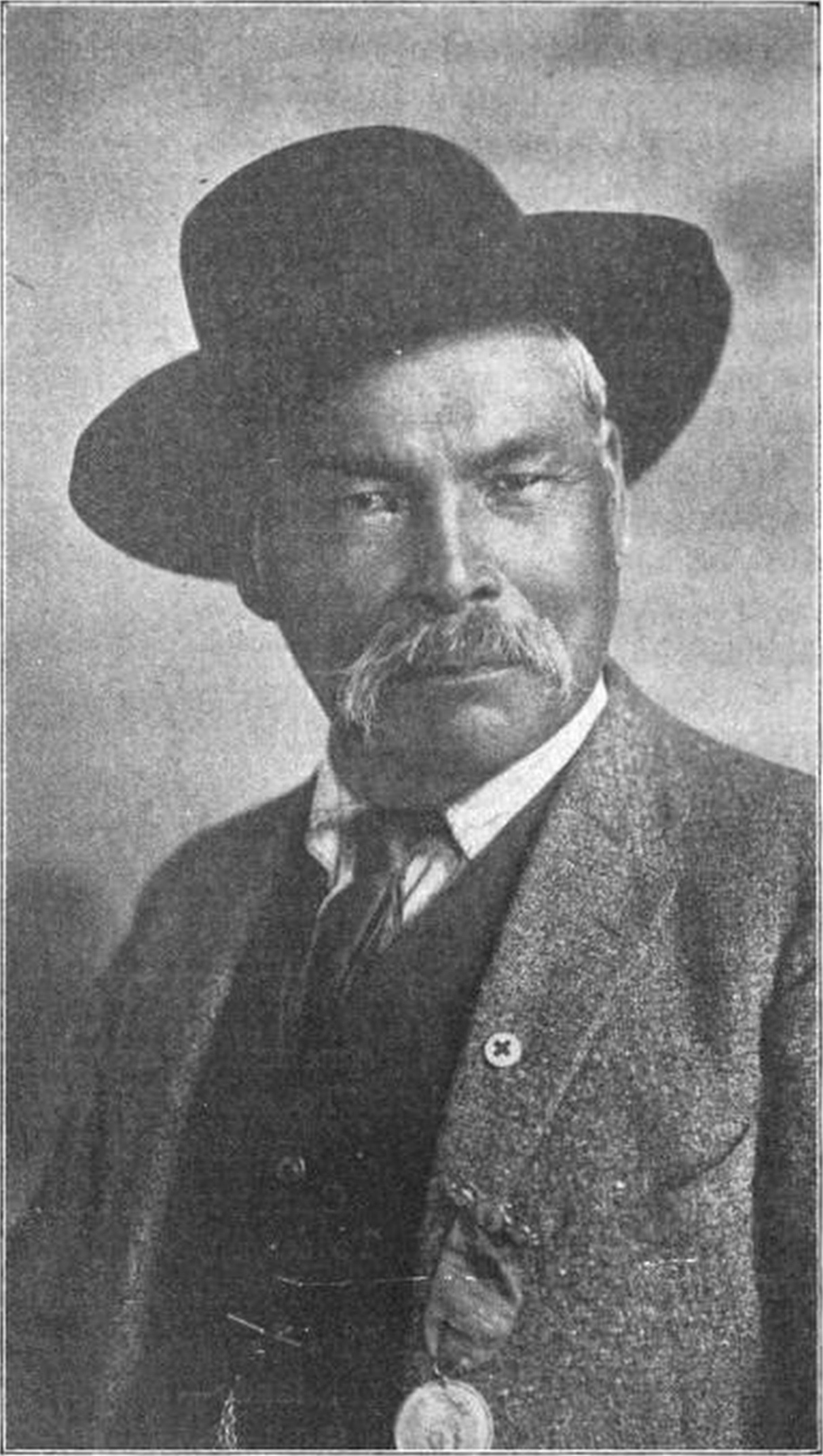
Potawatomi leader Simon Onanguisse Kahquados, 1919

In 1831, the Menominee ceded their claim to the area including what is now Mishicot to the United States. As a result of this treaty (Treaty of Washington), settlers could purchase land, but many fishermen still chose to live as squatters. At the same time, the more decentralized Potawatomi were divested of their land without compensation. Many emigrated to Canada because of invitations from other Native Americans already in Canada, favorable treaty arrangements, and a desire to avoid the harsh terms of the 1833 Treaty of Chicago. Although not all Potawatomi participated in the Treaty of Chicago, it was federal policy that any who did not relocate westward as the treaty stipulated would not be compensated for their land.

Mishicott resident Simon Kahquados, a Potawatomi leader and activist, traveled to Washington, D.C. multiple times in an attempt to get the land back. In 1906, Congress passed a law to establish a census of all Potawatomi formerly living in Wisconsin and Michigan as a first step toward compensation. The 1907 "Wooster" roll, named after the clerk who compiled it, documented 457 Potawatomi living in Wisconsin and Michigan and 1423 in Ontario. Instead of returning the land, a meager monthly payment was issued. Although Kahquados was unsuccessful, he increased public awareness of Potawatomi history. In 1931, 15,000 people attended his burial in Peninsula State Park.

The original spelling of the village's name was Mishicott, with two T's at the end, after the Potowatami Chief Mishicott. The second T was officially dropped around 1950, when the village was legally incorporated with the State of Wisconsin. Mishicott’s Potawatomi name was Na-ya-to-shingh, or Hairy Leg, for the fluffy white feathers on the upper leg of a horned owl.

The early settlers of the village and the surrounding rural farmlands came from a number of countries, but most prominently from Germany, Bohemia, Switzerland and Canada. In 1852, the name of the township and unincorporated village was changed to Saxonburg, but the name was reverted about 18 months later.

By the beginning of the 20th century, the village would have six hotels, three general stores, a movie theater, a grist mill, a brewery, and three churches. The first public school was organized in 1849, and the first public school building was constructed the same year.

== Geography ==
Mishicot is located at 44°14′6″N 87°38′29″W (44.235022, -87.641409).

According to the United States Census Bureau, the village has a total area of 2.57 square miles (6.66 km^{2}), of which 2.52 square miles (6.53 km^{2}) is land and 0.05 square miles (0.13 km^{2}) is water. The East Twin River passes through the village. The village is located about midway between I-43 and WIS 42, and is connected to the interstate and Two Rivers via WIS 147.

== Demographics ==
Historical population
Census	Pop.	Note	%±
1880	159		—
1960	762		—
1970	938		23.1%
1980	1,503		60.2%
1990	1,296		−13.8%
2000	1,422		9.7%
2010	1,442		1.4%
2020	1,432		−0.7%
U.S. Decennial Census

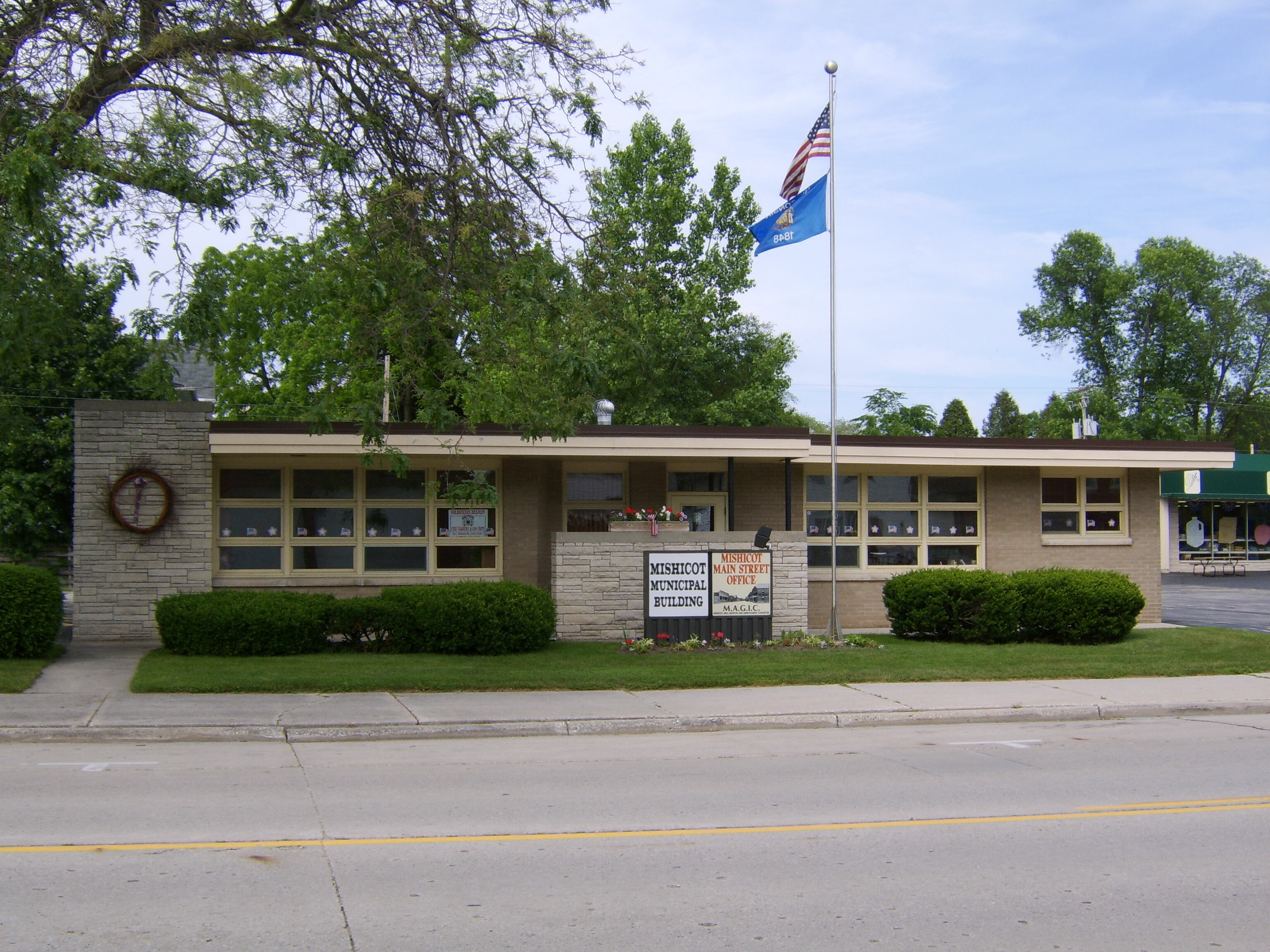
Village Hall

=== 2010 census ===
As of the census of 2010, there were 1,442 people, 623 households, and 419 families living in the village. The population density was 572.2 inhabitants per square mile (220.9/km^{2}). There were 663 housing units at an average density of 263.1 per square mile (101.6/km^{2}). The racial makeup of the village was 97.5% White, 0.1% African American, 0.8% Native American, 0.1% Asian, 0.1% Pacific Islander, 0.6% from other races, and 0.8% from two or more races. Hispanic or Latino people of any race were 0.9% of the population.

There were 623 households, of which 29.7% had children under the age of 18 living with them, 54.3% were married couples living together, 6.9% had a female householder with no husband present, 6.1% had a male householder with no wife present, and 32.7% were non-families. 28.1% of all households were made up of individuals, and 13.5% had someone living alone who was 65 years of age or older. The average household size was 2.31 and the average family size was 2.80.

The median age in the village was 44.3 years. 21.5% of residents were under the age of 18; 7.7% were between the ages of 18 and 24; 21.7% were from 25 to 44; 28.5% were from 45 to 64; and 20.7% were 65 years of age or older. The gender makeup of the village was 49.4% male and 50.6% female.

=== 2000 census ===
As of the census of 2000, there were 1,422 people, 582 households, and 405 families living in the village. The population density was 556.6 people per square mile (215.3/km^{2}). There were 614 housing units at an average density of 240.3 per square mile (93.0/km^{2}). The racial makeup of the village was 99.02% White, 0.14% Black or African American, 0.28% Native American, 0.28% Asian, 0.07% from other races, and 0.21% from two or more races. 0.28% of the population were Hispanic or Latino of any race.

There were 582 households, out of which 29.4% had children under the age of 18 living with them, 58.6% were married couples living together, 7.7% had a female householder with no husband present, and 30.4% were non-families. 26.6% of all households were made up of individuals, and 12.0% had someone living alone who was 65 years of age or older. The average household size was 2.44 and the average family size was 2.98.

In the village, the population was spread out, with 24.9% under the age of 18, 7.2% from 18 to 24, 26.2% from 25 to 44, 24.2% from 45 to 64, and 17.5% who were 65 years of age or older. The median age was 39 years. For every 100 females, there were 102.0 males. For every 100 females age 18 and over, there were 102.7 males.

The median income per household in the village was $43,083, and the median income for a family was $51,917. Males had a median income of $37,419 versus $23,938 for females. The per capita income for the village was $20,175. About 3.1% of families and 4.4% of the population were below the poverty line, including 3.5% of those under age 18 and 7.0% of those age 65 or over.

== Education ==
The Mishicot School District serves the village of Mishicot and several surrounding towns. It operates O. H. Schultz Elementary School, Mishicot Middle School, and Mishicot Community High School. All are located in the village, with the entire campus situated in the northeastern part of the village. The middle and high schools are attached.

== Notable people ==
- Cindy Bremser: retired long-distance runner, 1984 U.S. Olympian
- Vicki Goetze: LPGA golfer, U.S. Amateur and NCAA champion, 1988 and 1990 American Junior Golf Association Player of the Year
- Edgar A. Jonas: U.S. Representative (1949–1955) from Illinois
- Joseph Rankin: U.S. Representative (1883–1886) from Wisconsin
- Christian Sarau: Wisconsin State Representative (1899) and State Senator (1903–1904)
- Raymond J. Scheuer: Wisconsin State Representative (1933)
- Nicholas H. Terens: Wisconsin State Assembly (1903)
