= George J. Schneider =

American politician (1877–1939)

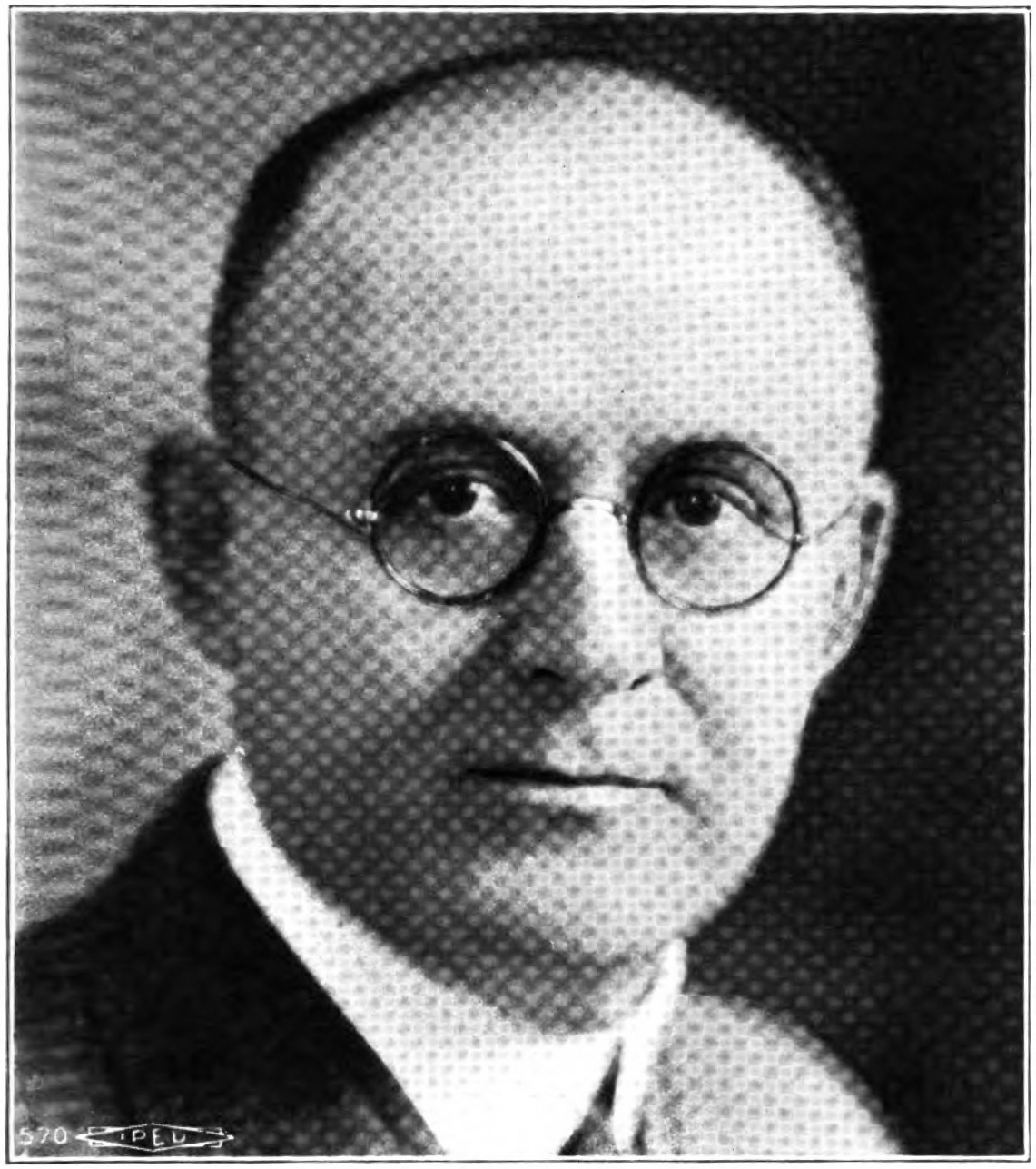
- Schneider c. 1924

Member of the U.S. House of Representatives from Wisconsin
- In office January 3, 1935 – January 3, 1939
- Preceded by: James F. Hughes
- Succeeded by: Joshua L. Johns
- Constituency: 8th district
- In office March 4, 1923 – March 3, 1933
- Preceded by: David G. Classon
- Succeeded by: James A. Frear
- Constituency: 9th district

Personal details
- Born: October 30, 1877 Grand Chute, Wisconsin, U.S.
- Died: March 12, 1939 (aged 61) Toledo, Ohio, U.S.
- Party: Wisconsin Progressive Party (1934-1946); Republican (until 1934)

George John Schneider (October 30, 1877 – March 12, 1939) was a U.S. representative from Wisconsin.

Born in the town of Grand Chute, Wisconsin, Schneider moved to Appleton with his parents, and attended the public schools there. He learned the trade of paper making, and became active in his trade union. He served as vice-president of the International Brotherhood of Paper Makers from 1909 to 1927.

He served on the executive board of the Wisconsin State Federation of Labor from 1921 to 1928.

== Public office ==
Schneider was elected as a Republican to the Sixty-eighth through Seventy-second Congresses (March 4, 1923 – March 3, 1933). During this time in congress he was the representative of Wisconsin's 9th congressional district. He was an unsuccessful candidate for reelection in 1932 to the Seventy-third Congress.

After the split between the Wisconsin Republican Party and the Wisconsin Progressive Party, Schneider was elected as a member of the Progressive Party to the Seventy-fourth and Seventy-fifth Congresses (January 3, 1935 – January 3, 1939). This time he was the representative of Wisconsin's 8th congressional district. He was an unsuccessful candidate for reelection in 1938 to the Seventy-sixth Congress.

== After Congress ==
He resumed labor activities and died in Toledo, Ohio, on March 12, 1939, while attending a labor meeting. He was interred in Riverside Cemetery in Appleton.

== Notes ==
U.S. House of Representatives
Preceded by David G. Classon	Member of the U.S. House of Representatives from Wisconsin's 9th congressional district March 4, 1923 - March 3, 1933	Succeeded by James A. Frear
Preceded by James F. Hughes	Member of the U.S. House of Representatives from Wisconsin's 8th congressional district January 3, 1935 - January 3, 1939	Succeeded by Joshua L. Johns
