= Jacob Rodrian =

American politician (1845–1915)

Philip Jacob Rodrian (1845 – May 12, 1915) was an American farmer and politician.

Rodrian was born on November 6, 1845, in Fuerfeld, Grand Duchy of Hesse. Rodrian emigrated to the United States with his parents, in 1869, and settled in Hartford, Wisconsin. In 1871, Rodrian moved to the town of Ahnapee, Kewaunee County, Wisconsin, and settled on a farm. Rodrian served as Anhapee town treasurer and assessor. Rodrian was active in the Democratic Party. In 1895, Rodrian served in the Wisconsin State Assembly. In 1914, Rodrian and his wife moved to Algoma, Wisconsin. Rodrian died of cancer at his home in Algoma, Wisconsin.
