= Norman S. Dike =

American lawyer, sheriff, and judge

Norman S Dike
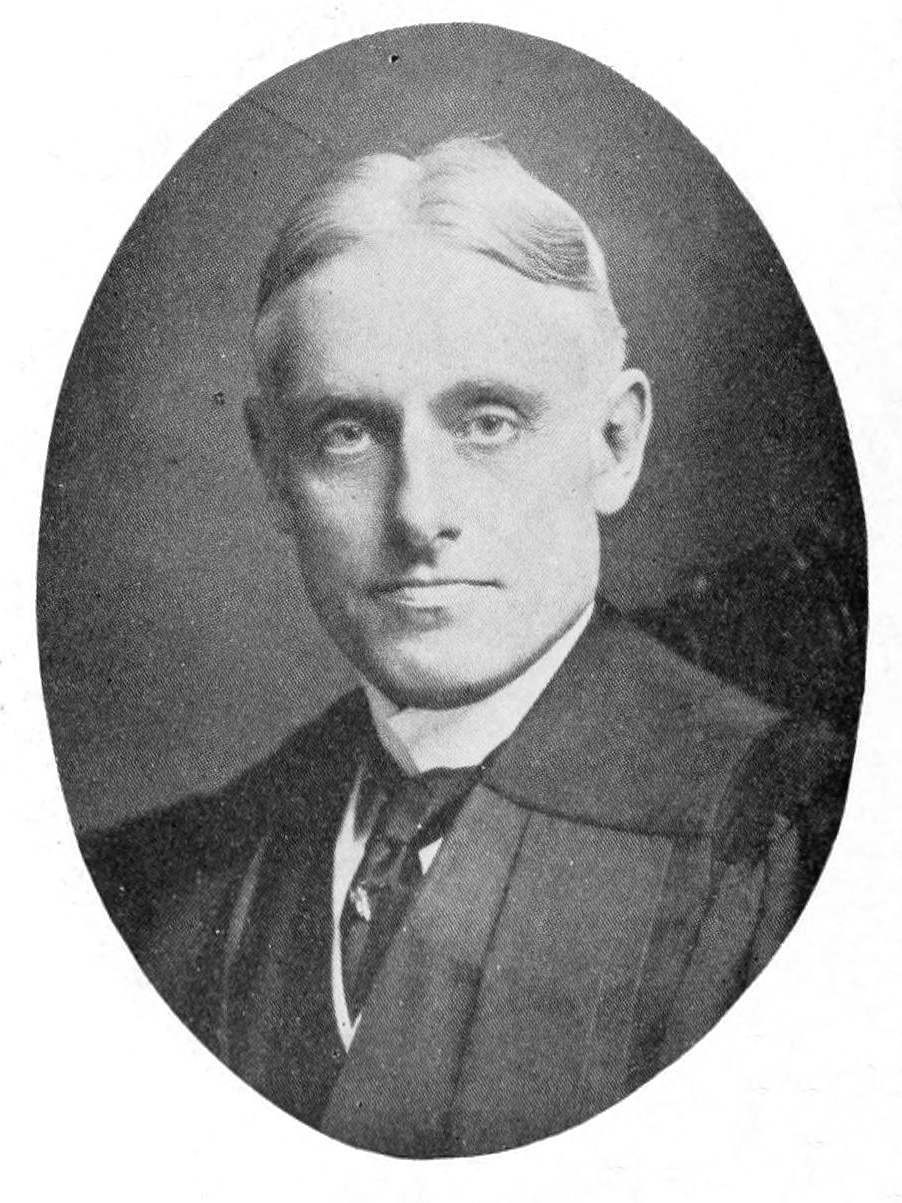
- Born: 22 October 1862; Brooklyn, New York
- Died: 15 April 1953 (aged 90); Brooklyn, New York
- Education: Brown University, Columbia University
- Occupations: Lawyer, judge
- Political party: Republican
- Children: Norman Dike Jr.

Norman Staunton Dike (October 22, 1862 – April 15, 1953) was a New York State Supreme Court judge from 1920 to 1932. He had previously worked as a lawyer, sheriff, and judge in Brooklyn, New York. He was also a prominent member of the Brooklyn social scene.

== Parents and early life ==
Dike was born in Brooklyn on October 22, 1862 the son of Camden C. Dike and Jennie Scott Dike. Dike's middle name was also given as Scott. Camden was a wool merchant in New York City and was active in city Republican politics. Camden was born in Providence, Rhode Island, the son of Albyn V. and Phebe A. Dike. Camden died on October 11, 1894, in Point Pleasant, New Jersey, of typhoid. Jennie was a native of Rochester, New York, and was the daughter of David and Maria Scott and granddaughter of Phineas Stanton, an officer in the War of 1812 and later a general in the New York State militia. He had two sisters, Miriam (who married Murray Boocock) and Jennie (who married G. C. F. Williams). He attended Brooklyn Polytechnic Institute and then Brown University, where he graduated in 1885 with a Ph B. In 1887 he graduated from Columbia University Law School with an LL B. At Brown, Dike was editor of the Brunonian and Liber Brunensis, President of the Boating Association and the Hammer & Tongs Dramatic Association, manager of the baseball team, class marshal, class president, and a member of the Psi Upsilon fraternity.

== Career ==
In 1890, Dike began practicing law in Manhattan and Brooklyn, first in the law office of Frederic A. Ward, and became prominent as counsel for the Kings County Bank. In 1893 he was elected supervisor from Brooklyn's first ward as a Republican. In 1895, he became chairman of the board. He served on the National Guard staff as assistant to the Judge Advocate General with the rank of lieutenant colonel in 1894.

In 1902, New York Governor Benjamin B. Odell Jr. appointed Dike Kings County Sheriff, succeeding Charles Guden in a controversial move by Odell. After serving for ten months, Dike was appointed commissioner of the State Tuberculosis Hospital. Dike's prominence in society gave him the nickname, "society sheriff".

In 1906, Dike was appointed judge in King County by governor Frank W. Higgins, succeeding Joe Aspinall. His society reputation followed him to the post, and he was given another moniker, "Pink Tea" Judge. In 1908, Dike received death threats in a letter addressed to him and Brooklyn detective Antonio Vachris from the "Black Hand", a terrorist group. That year he was elected county judge, and he was reelected in 1913 and 1919.

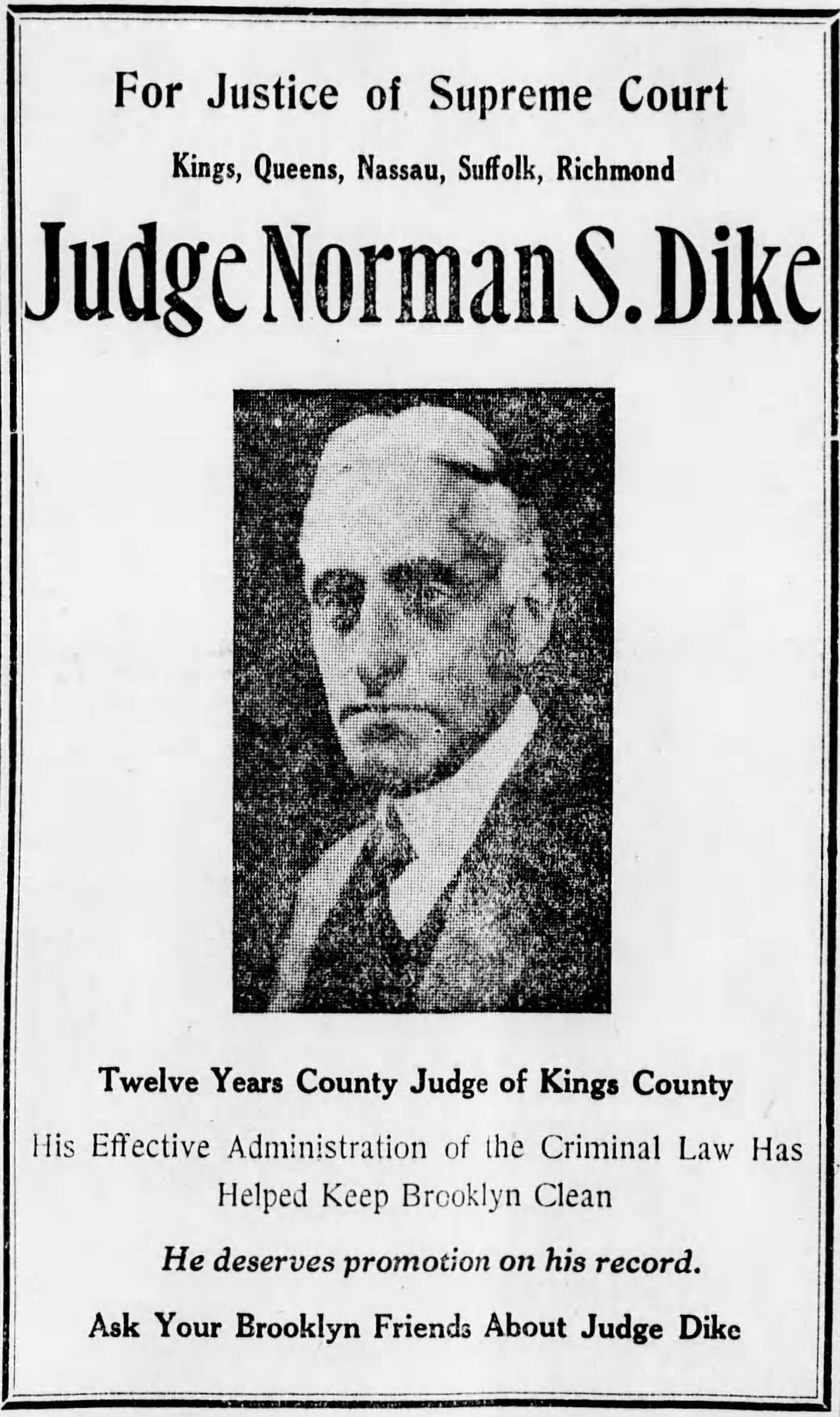
Campaign Ad for Dike from 1918

In 1920, he was elected to the New York Supreme Court, where he served until retirement in 1932, when he reached the age limit. As a judge, Dike was known for his severity towards criminals and belief in punishment as a deterrent. After retirement he became referee for the second Judicial District of the New York Supreme Court.

== Other activities ==
He was active in society and as a community leader. He served as president of the Brown University Alumni Association of New York. He was a trustee of the Brooklyn Homeopathic Hospital, later known as the Cumberland Hospital. His mother had been president of the same hospital's Ladies Aid Association. He was president of the board of trustees of the hospital for seven years. He was a member of the American Bar Association, the New York State Bar Association, and the Brooklyn Bar Association. He also served as director of the Hamilton Club of Brooklyn, and was a member of the Union and University Clubs of Manhattan and of the Montauk Lodge, Free and Accepted Masons.

== Family and death ==
In June 1917, Dike married Evelyn Moore Biddle. They divorced in 1939. They had one child, Norman Staunton Dike Jr. on May 19, 1918. His son was featured on the popular HBO miniseries Band of Brothers, played by actor Peter O'Meara. In 1942, Dike wrote a genealogical narrative of his family entitled, Narrative of Anthony Dike, Albyn Valentine Dike Branch, 1623-1942. Dike died on April 15, 1953.

== Writings ==
- Dike, Norman Staunton (1942). Narrative of Anthony Dike; Albyn Valentine Dike Branch 1623 — 1942. Cambridge, Massachusetts: Shea Brothers Printers. p. 43. hdl:2027/wu.89064055692.
