= Paul Hoverson =

American politician (1868–1962)

Paul P. Hoverson (October 13, 1868 – October 15, 1962) was an American farmer and politician.

By occupation, Hoverson was a farmer. He served as chairman and supervisor of the Franklin Town Board and also served on the Franklin Town School Board. Hoverson represented Kewaunee County in the Wisconsin State Assembly beginning in 1912 and was a Republican. In 1913, he served on the standing committee for Education. The following year, Hoverson lost with 957 votes to William H. O'Brien's 1,701 votes; O'Brien, a Democrat, was at that time the treasurer of Kewaunee County. Paul Hoverson died at the age of 94 at the Manitowoc County Hospital in Manitowoc, Wisconsin.

== Family ==
Paul Hoverson was born in Franklin, Wisconsin to Norwegian immigrants. Around 1895, Hoverson married Jane Krajink, daughter of Bohemian immigrants to Wisconsin. Their son, Oscar J. Hoverson (1896 – 1982), served in the First World War as a wagoner from August 15, 1918, to June 10, 1919.
