= Black Earth, Wisconsin (Potawatomi village) =

Former Native American settlement in Wisconsin

Coordinates: 44°21′09″N 87°36′12″W

Black Earth (Potawatomi: Ma-Kah-Da-We-Kah-Mich-Cock) was a village inhabited by Potawatomi, Odawa, and Ojibwe people that was located in the present-day Town of Carlton, Kewaunee County, Wisconsin, United States. Inhabited by Native Americans for several hundred years, Black Earth was one of Wisconsin's Potawatomi communities that continued to exist in the decades after many Potawatomi left Wisconsin under the terms of the 1833 Treaty of Chicago.

In January 1852, Andrew J. Vieau and his wife, Rebecca, acquired the deed to the property and began granting land to individual tribe members. In 1858, John Axtell learned the Natives were not paying taxes for their property. Without the Potawatomis' knowledge, he took out a tax lien against their holdings in Black Earth and began paying their taxes in order to acquire legal ownership of the land. By 1862, he owned the land and took action to forcibly remove the Native Americans with assistance from a group of approximately 15 other white men. As many as 1,000 people were displaced and became refugees, dividing into small bands and moving to northern Wisconsin and the Upper Peninsula of Michigan.

== Notable people ==
- Simon Kahquados, Potawatomi leader and activist
