= Franklin, Kewaunee County, Wisconsin =

Franklin, Wisconsin
- Town
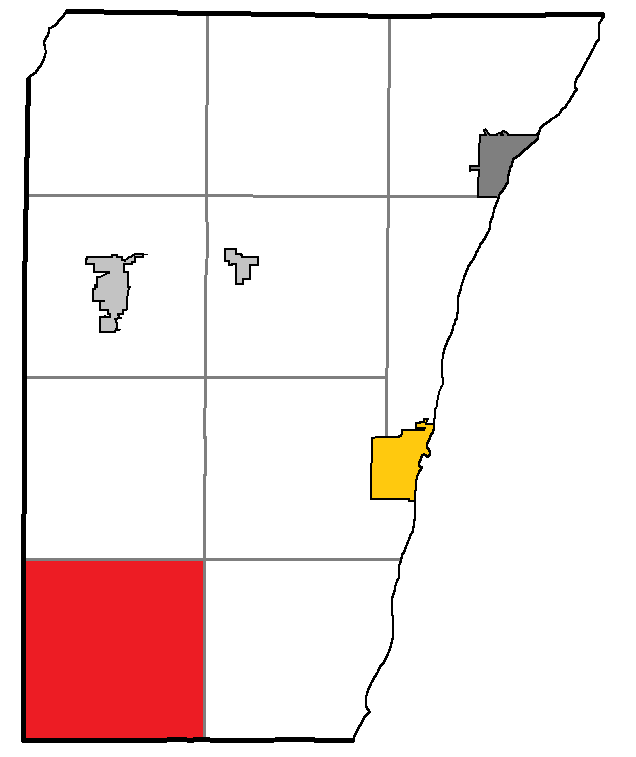
- Location of Franklin, within Kewaunee County
- Coordinates: 44°22′0″N 87°42′55″W
- Country: United States
- State: Wisconsin
- County: Kewaunee

Area
  - Total: 36.2 sq mi (93.7 km^{2})
  - Land: 35.5 sq mi (91.9 km^{2})
  - Water: 0.69 sq mi (1.8 km^{2})
- Elevation: 804 ft (245 m)

Population (2020)
  - Total: 964
  - Density: 27.2/sq mi (10.5/km^{2})
- Time zone: UTC-6 (Central (CST))
  - Summer (DST): UTC-5 (CDT)
- Area code: 920
- FIPS code: 55-27250
- GNIS feature ID: 1583232
- Website: franklinkewauneecowi.gov

Franklin is a town in Kewaunee County, Wisconsin, United States. The population was 964 at the 2020 census.

== Communities ==
- Bolt is an unincorporated community located at the intersection of County Road Q and Bolt Road.
- Curran is an unincorporated community located at the intersection of County Roads KB (former section of WIS 96) and V.
- Stangleville is an unincorporated community located at the intersection of County Roads J and AB (former WIS 163).

== Geography ==
Franklin is in the southwestern corner of Kewaunee County. It is bordered to the west by Brown County and to the south by Manitowoc County. According to the United States Census Bureau, the town has a total area of 36.2 square miles (93.7 km^{2}), of which 35.5 square miles (91.9 km^{2}) are land and 0.69 square miles (1.8 km^{2}), or 1.91%, are water.

== Demographics ==
As of the census of 2000, there were 997 people, 338 households, and 270 families residing in the town. The population density was 28.1 people per square mile (10.8/km^{2}). There were 359 housing units at an average density of 10.1 per square mile (3.9/km^{2}). The racial makeup of the town was 99.20% White, 0.30% African American, 0.30% Asian, 0.10% from other races, and 0.10% from two or more races. Hispanic or Latino of any race were 0.60% of the population.

There were 338 households, out of which 38.5% had children under the age of 18 living with them, 67.8% were married couples living together, 6.5% had a female householder with no husband present, and 20.1% were non-families. 14.8% of all households were made up of individuals, and 6.5% had someone living alone who was 65 years of age or older. The average household size was 2.95 and the average family size was 3.30.

In the town, the population was spread out, with 28.6% under the age of 18, 7.8% from 18 to 24, 29.0% from 25 to 44, 24.7% from 45 to 64, and 9.9% who were 65 years of age or older. The median age was 36 years. For every 100 females, there were 112.6 males. For every 100 females age 18 and over, there were 117.1 males.

The median income for a household in the town was $52,019, and the median income for a family was $57,212. Males had a median income of $33,958 versus $22,237 for females. The per capita income for the town was $19,401. About 2.2% of families and 2.4% of the population were below the poverty line, including none of those under age 18 and 4.0% of those age 65 or over.

== Notable people ==
- Anton Holly, Wisconsin state representative, born in Franklin
- Paul Hoverson, Wisconsin state representative, born in Franklin
- Thomas F. Konop, member of the United States House of Representatives, born in Franklin
- William H. O'Brien, Wisconsin state representative, born in Franklin
