= Maynard T. Parker =

American politician (1850–1915)

Maynard T. Parker (October 30, 1850 – June 25, 1915) was an American jurist, newspaper editor, and politician.

Born in Roxbury, New Hampshire, Parker moved to Racine, Wisconsin, with his parents in 1854. He then moved with his parents to Ahnapee, Kewaunee County, Wisconsin, in 1855. Parker was one of the editors and owners of the Ahnapee Record newspaper. He went to Ripon College and was admitted to the Wisconsin bar in 1879. Parker practiced law in Algoma, Wisconsin. He served as Algoma village and city clerk. Parker also served as mayor of Algoma. Parker served as Algoma city attorney and Kewaunee County district attorney. In 1897, Parker served in the Wisconsin State Assembly and was a Republican. Parker then served as Kewaunee County judge until his death. He died at his home in Algoma.
