= Carlton, Wisconsin =

- Town
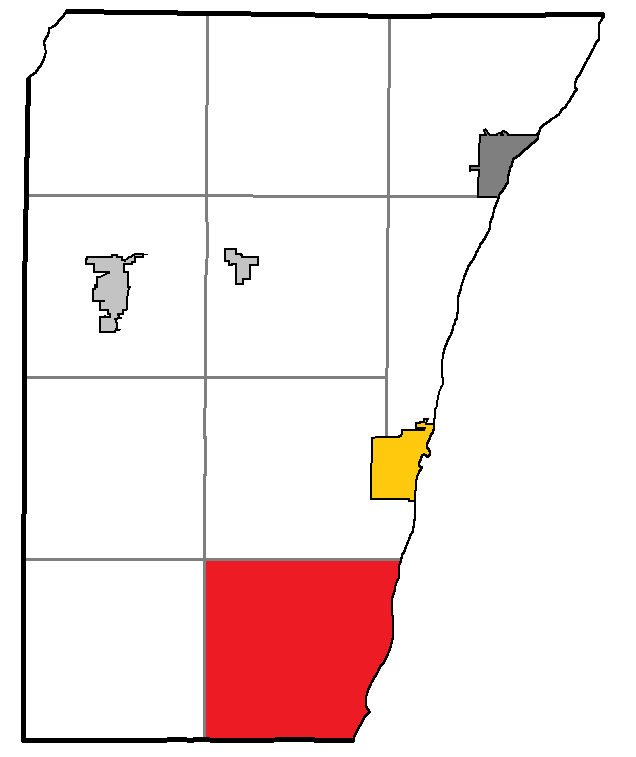
- Location of Carlton, within Kewaunee County
- Coordinates: 44°22′42″N 87°34′40″W
- Country: United States
- State: Wisconsin
- County: Kewaunee

Area
  - Total: 35.6 sq mi (92.2 km^{2})
  - Land: 35.6 sq mi (92.2 km^{2})
  - Water: 0 sq mi (0.0 km^{2})
- Elevation: 702 ft (214 m)

Population (2020)
  - Total: 1,008
  - Density: 28.3/sq mi (10.9/km^{2})
- Time zone: UTC-6 (Central (CST))
  - Summer (DST): UTC-5 (CDT)
- Area code: 920
- FIPS code: 55-12575
- GNIS feature ID: 1582917
- Website: townofcarltonwi.com

Carlton is a town in Kewaunee County, Wisconsin, United States. The population was 1,008 at the 2020 census. Carlton is probably named for James Carlton, an early settler in the area.

== Communities ==
- Black Earth was a former Native American village in the town until 1862.
- Norman is an unincorporated community located at the intersection of County Road G and Norman Road.
- Tisch Mills is an unincorporated community located on the Kewaunee-Manitowoc county line at the intersection of County Road B/Tisch Mills Road and County Road BB.

== Economy ==
The Kewaunee Nuclear Generating Station is in Carlton. It was decommissioned in 2013.

== Geography ==
Carlton is in the southeastern corner of Kewaunee County. It is bordered to the south by Manitowoc County and to the east by Lake Michigan. According to the United States Census Bureau, the town has a total area of 35.6 square miles (92.2 km^{2}), all land.

The northernmost portion of the Wisconsin Shipwreck Coast National Marine Sanctuary lies in the waters of Lake Michigan off Carlton.

== Demographics ==
As of the census of 2000, there were 1,000 people, 363 households, and 283 families residing in the town. The population density was 28.1 people per square mile (10.8/km^{2}). There were 383 housing units at an average density of 10.7 per square mile (4.2/km^{2}). The racial makeup of the town was 99.50% White, 0.10% Pacific Islander, 0.20% from other races, and 0.20% from two or more races. Hispanic or Latino of any race were 0.20% of the population.

There were 363 households, out of which 32.8% had children under the age of 18 living with them, 69.4% were married couples living together, 4.1% had a female householder with no husband present, and 22.0% were non-families. 19.6% of all households were made up of individuals, and 8.8% had someone living alone who was 65 years of age or older. The average household size was 2.75 and the average family size was 3.18.

In the town, the population was spread out, with 25.4% under the age of 18, 7.1% from 18 to 24, 29.8% from 25 to 44, 24.6% from 45 to 64, and 13.1% who were 65 years of age or older. The median age was 38 years. For every 100 females, there were 108.3 males. For every 100 females age 18 and over, there were 110.1 males.

The median income for a household in the town was $50,227, and the median income for a family was $56,094. Males had a median income of $31,667 versus $22,159 for females. The per capita income for the town was $20,660. About 2.7% of families and 3.0% of the population were below the poverty line, including 1.7% of those under age 18 and 3.8% of those age 65 or over.

== Notable people ==
- Anton Holly, Wisconsin state representative, owned a farm in the town
- Simon Kahquados, Potawatomi leader and activist
- William Rogers, judge
- Charles Tisch, Wisconsin state representative
