= Anton G. Schauer =

American politician

Anton G. Schauer (June 13, 1860 – May 2, 1932) was an American businessman, educator, and politician.

Born in the town of Mishicot, Manitowoc County, Wisconsin, Schauer moved to Kewaunee County, Wisconsin and settled in Tisch Mills, Wisconsin, where he taught school, farmed, and worked as an assistant cashier for the Farmers and Merchants Bank of Kewaunee. Schauer served as sheriff, clerk of the Wisconsin Circuit Court and register of deeds for Kewaunee County. Schauer was a Republican. He served as postmaster for Norman, Wisconsin. In 1905, 1907, 1927, and 1929, Schauer served in the Wisconsin State Assembly. Schauer died in a hospital in Green Bay, Wisconsin following major surgery.
