= William Rogers (Wisconsin politician) =

American politician

William Rogers (June 12, 1838 – August 11, 1911) was an American judge and politician.

Rogers was born in Gloucester County, New Brunswick, Canada. In 1852, he emigrated to the United States and settled in Kewaunee County, Wisconsin. He went to the public schools in Kewaunee County. Rogers served as county clerk for Kewaunee County and as chairman of the Carlton, Wisconsin Town Board. Rogers was a Democrat. He served in the Wisconsin Assembly in 1882 and from 1901 to 1903. He then served as Kewaunee County Court judge from 1904 until his death in 1911. He died at his home in Kewaunee, Wisconsin.
