= William H. O'Brien =

American politician

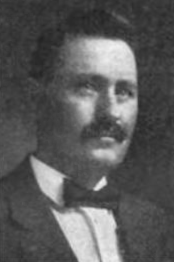

William H. O'Brien was a member of the Wisconsin State Assembly.

== Biography ==
O'Brien was born on June 17, 1871, in Franklin, Kewaunee County, Wisconsin. He would become a teacher and would own and operate a farm in Franklin.

== Political career ==
O'Brien was elected to the assembly in 1914, 1916 and 1918. At the time of his election to the assembly, he was county treasurer of Kewaunee County, Wisconsin, having been elected in 1910 and 1912. In addition, O'Brien had been chairman (similar to mayor) and town clerk of Franklin and a member and vice chairman of the County Board of Kewaunee County. He was a Democrat.
