= Moses Shaw (American politician) =

American politician (1861–1934)

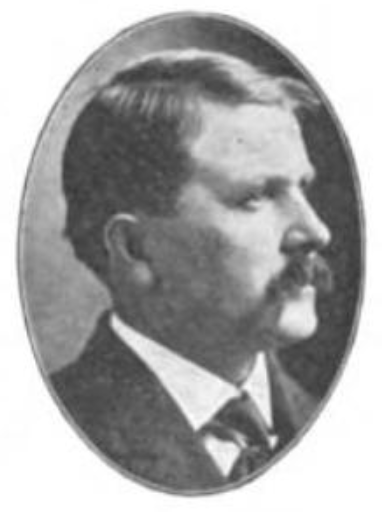

Member of the Wisconsin State Assembly
- In office 1908–1910
- Constituency: Kewaunee County

Personal details
- Born: November 8, 1861 Ahnapee, Wisconsin
- Died: February 3, 1934 (aged 72) Ahnapee, Wisconsin
- Party: Republican
- Occupation: Farmer, politician

Moses Shaw (November 8, 1861 – February 3, 1934) was an American politician who served as a member of the Wisconsin State Assembly.

== Biography ==
Shaw was born on November 8, 1861, in Ahnapee, Wisconsin.

He died from heart disease at his home in Ahnapee on February 3, 1934.

== Career ==
Shaw was elected to the Assembly in 1908. Other duties he held include serving as the town chairman (similar to mayor) of Ahnapee. He was a Republican.
