= Ahnapee, Wisconsin =

- Town
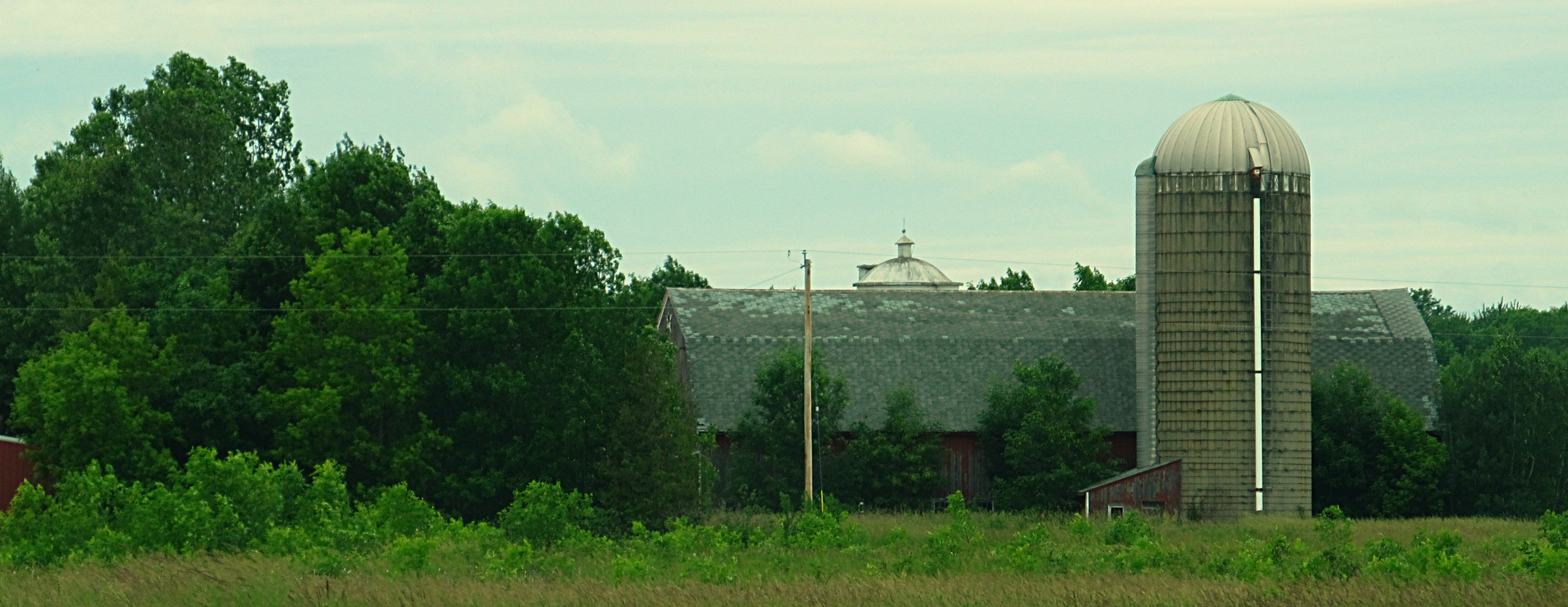
- View from County Trunk S in the vicinity of Rankin

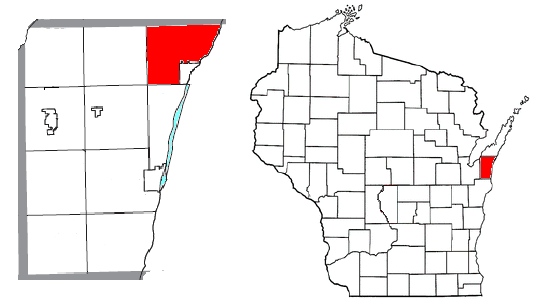
- Location in Kewaunee County and the state of Wisconsin
- Coordinates: 44°38′N 87°28′W
- Country: United States
- State: Wisconsin
- County: Kewaunee

Area
  - Total: 31.1 sq mi (80.6 km^{2})
  - Land: 30.9 sq mi (80.1 km^{2})
  - Water: 0.19 sq mi (0.5 km^{2})
- Elevation: 587 ft (179 m)

Population (2020)
  - Total: 870
  - Density: 28/sq mi (11/km^{2})
- Time zone: UTC-6 (Central (CST))
  - Summer (DST): UTC-5 (CDT)
- Area code: 920
- FIPS code: 55-00600
- GNIS feature ID: 1582661
- Website: townofahnapee.org

Ahnapee (/ˈænəpi/ ANN-ə-pee) is a town in Kewaunee County, Wisconsin, United States, on the Ahnapee River. The population was 870 as of the 2020 census. The Ahnapee State Trail passes through the town of Ahnapee.

== Communities ==
- Bruemmerville is an unincorporated community located at the intersection of Fremont Street and Willow Drive west of Algoma's city limits. The community was named for Henry Bruemmer, who bought a grist mill on Silver Creek in 1866 and established a brick manufacturing plant.
- Kodan (/ˈkoʊdən/ KOH-dən) is a small unincorporated hamlet located on the northeastern corner of the intersection with County Roads D and M.
- Rankin is an unincorporated community located southwest of the WIS 54 and County Road D Intersection, three miles west of Algoma. Founded as a German farming settlement, originally known as Kuke's Corners until the establishment of a post office in 1886. The post office and community were named in honor of Joseph Rankin, a businessman, politician, soldier, and congressman.

== History ==
The name Ahnapee is of Ojibwe origin. It is derived from anin api ("when").

The first settlers of the area came from Manitowoc in 1851, the town's first mill and store opened in 1855, and regular river travel from the port started in 1856. The village of Ahnapee was incorporated in 1873, and got its first mayor in 1879, Samuel Perry. The village (and later city) of Ahnapee was renamed "Algoma" in 1897. The region's first newspaper, The Ahnapee Record, was established in 1873. A rail line first reached the town in 1882.

== Geography ==
According to the United States Census Bureau, the town has a total area of 31.1 square miles (80.6 km^{2}), of which 30.9 square miles (80.1 km^{2}) are land and 0.2 square miles (0.5 km^{2}), or 0.60%, are water. The town is bordered to the north by Door County, to the east by Lake Michigan, and to the southeast by the city of Algoma.

== Demographics ==
Census information for Ahnapee Township shows populations of 718 in 1860 and 1,544 in 1870, including the main settlement of Ahnapee. After incorporation of the village of Ahnapee (subsequently renamed Algoma in 1897), census information showed 978 residents remaining in the surrounding town of Ahnapee in 1880, peaking at 2,082 in 1910, before decreasing to 1,911 in 1920. Settlers who grew the population of the region were of several nationalities: English, Bohemian, German, Irish, Dutch, Danish, Belgian.

As of the census of 2000, there were 977 people, 371 households, and 277 families residing in the town. The population density was 31.5 people per square mile (12.2/km^{2}). There were 426 housing units at an average density of 13.8 per square mile (5.3/km^{2}). The racial makeup of the town was 97.85% White, 0.31% African American, 0.61% Native American, 0.92% from other races, and 0.31% from two or more races. Hispanic or Latino of any race were 2.15% of the population.

There were 371 households, out of which 32.1% had children under the age of 18 living with them, 67.7% were married couples living together, 3.5% had a female householder with no husband present, and 25.1% were non-families. 19.4% of all households were made up of individuals, and 8.9% had someone living alone who was 65 years of age or older. The average household size was 2.63 and the average family size was 3.01.

In the town, the population was spread out, with 23.8% under the age of 18, 8.2% from 18 to 24, 26.9% from 25 to 44, 26.6% from 45 to 64, and 14.4% who were 65 years of age or older. The median age was 40 years. For every 100 females, there were 103.1 males. For every 100 females age 18 and over, there were 105.0 males.

The median income for a household in the town was $47,500, and the median income for a family was $49,489. Males had a median income of $31,167 versus $21,518 for females. The per capita income for the town was $20,385. About 1.4% of families and 3.2% of the population were below the poverty line, including none of those under age 18 and 2.0% of those age 65 or over.

== Notable people ==
- August Fenske, farmer, Wisconsin state representative
- Bill Jorgenson, musician, "Father of Wisconsin Bluegrass"
- Maynard T. Parker, Wisconsin state representative
- Jacob Rodrian, Wisconsin state representative
- Moses Shaw, Wisconsin state representative
- Lyman Walker, Wisconsin state representative
- David Youngs, lumberman, Wisconsin state representative
