= Albert D. Shimek =

American politician

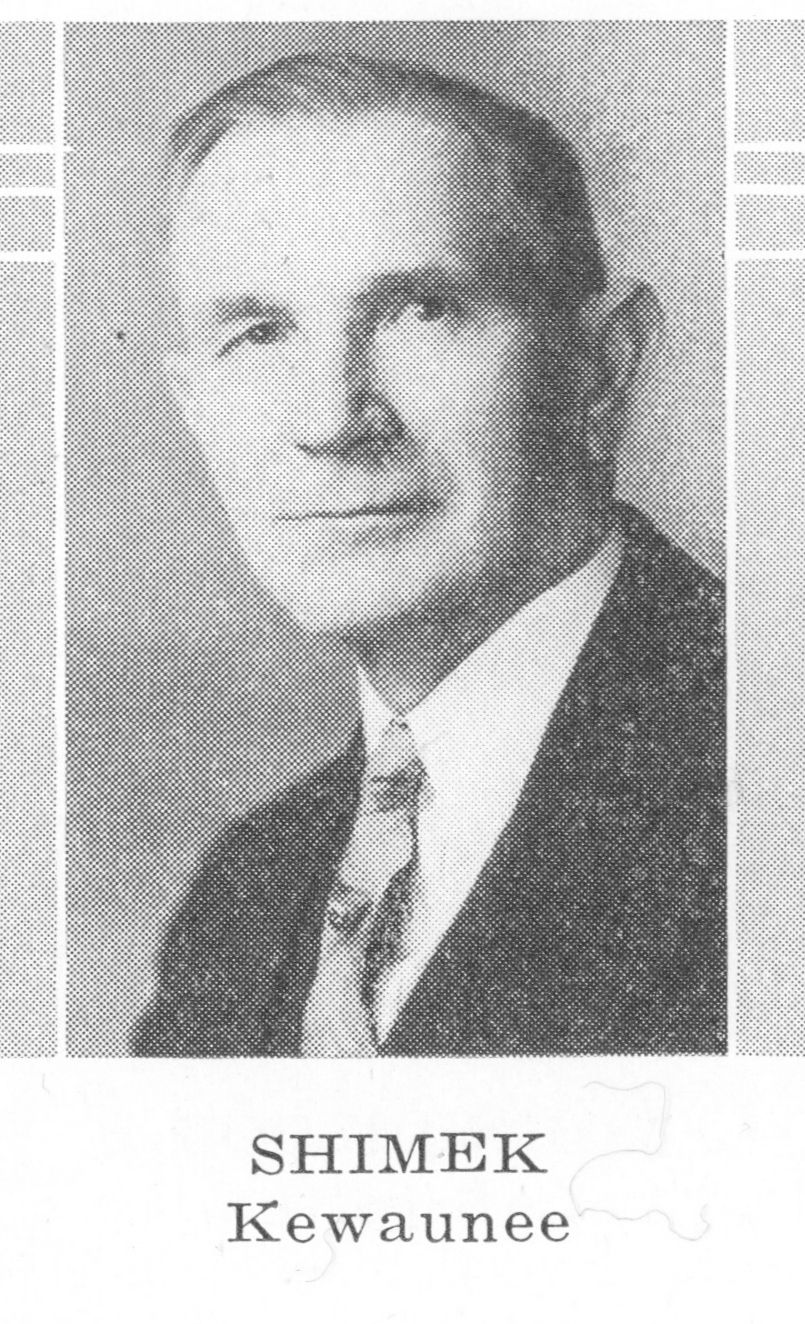
Albert D. Shimek

Albert D. Shimek (April 23, 1873 – June 7, 1960) was a member of the Wisconsin State Assembly.

== Biography ==
Shimek was born on April 23, 1873, in Casco, Wisconsin. He graduated from the University of Wisconsin–Stevens Point in 1904 and from Ferris State University in 1908. Shimek became a teacher, both at public and private schools. He died on June 7, 1960.

== Political career ==
Shimek was a member of the Assembly from 1933 to 1940. Additionally, he was President of the Algoma, Wisconsin School Board. He was a Democrat.
