= Wisconsin Highway 163 =

State highway in Wisconsin, United States

State Trunk Highway 163

Route information
- Maintained by WisDOT
- Length: 23.8 mi (38.3 km)
- Existed: 1923–1999

Major junctions
- South end: WIS 147 in Mishicot
- WIS 29 near Ellisville
- North end: WIS 54 in Luxembourg

Location
- Country: United States
- State: Wisconsin

Highway system
- Wisconsin State Trunk Highway System; Interstate; US; State; Scenic; Rustic
← WIS 162	→ WIS 164

State Trunk Highway 163 (often called Highway 163, STH-163 or WIS 163) was a state highway in the U.S. state of Wisconsin. It ran north–south between Mishicot and Luxemburg. The road was turned over to county control in 1999, and it is now designated as County Trunk Highway B (CTH-B) in Manitowoc County and CTH-AB in Kewaunee County.

== Route description ==
At its latest routing, WIS 163 began to travel northward from WIS 147 in Mishicot. Going past the Manitowoc–Kewaunee county line, it intersected WIS 29 near Ellisville. Continuing farther north, the highway ended at WIS 54 in Luxembourg.

== History ==
Initially, in 1923, WIS 163 was formed to travel from WIS 17 (now WIS 42) in Two Rivers to WIS 54 in Luxembourg. In 1935, WIS 147 extended southeast from Mishicot to Two Rivers, causing WIS 163 to be removed southeast of Mishicot. In 1970, WIS 163 was straightened west of Tisch Mills. In 1999, WIS 163 was decommissioned in favor of transferring this route to local control (replaced by CTH-B in Manitowoc County and CTH-A and AB in Kewaunee County). The route number has not been used ever since.

== Major intersections ==
County	Location	mi	km	Destinations	Notes
Manitowoc	Mishicot	0.00	0.00	WIS 147 – Larrabee, Two Rivers	
Kewaunee	Town of Montpelier	15.91	25.60	WIS 29 – Green Bay, Kewaunee	
Kewaunee	Luxemburg	23.80	38.30	WIS 54 – Green Bay, Algoma	
1.000 mi = 1.609 km; 1.000 km = 0.621 mi
