= Duvall, Wisconsin =

- Unincorporated community
- Location within Wisconsin Location within the United States
- Coordinates: 44°39′40″N 87°42′48″W
- Country: United States
- State: Wisconsin
- County: Kewaunee
- Town: Red River
- Elevation: 741 ft (226 m)
- Time zone: UTC-6 (Central (CST))
  - Summer (DST): UTC-5 (CDT)
- Area code: 920
- GNIS feature ID: 1564221

Duvall (/duːˈvɑːl/ doo-VAHL) is an unincorporated community in the town of Red River, Kewaunee County, Wisconsin, United States. It is situated at the junction of County Highways X and AB, 8 miles (13 km) north of the village of Luxemburg.

== History ==
The church of St. Frances DePaul was founded in 1858, and landed deeded in 1860 by Louis Marchant. The community was initially called Marchant because services were held in the Marchant family home until a church was built.

The formal name came in 1890 when the post office was established, named for Joseph Duvall, a prominent Kewaunee businessman and civic benefactor, who also served as postmaster.
