= Neuern, Wisconsin =

- Unincorporated community
- Location within Wisconsin Location within the United States
- Coordinates: 44°30′07″N 87°43′29″W
- Country: United States
- State: Wisconsin
- County: Kewaunee
- Towns: Luxemburg, Montpelier
- Elevation: 843 ft (257 m)
- Time zone: UTC-6 (Central (CST))
  - Summer (DST): UTC-5 (CDT)
- Area code: 920
- GNIS feature ID: 1570577

Neuern is an unincorporated community in the towns of Luxemburg and Montpelier, Kewaunee County, Wisconsin, United States. The community sits at the junction of County Highways N and V, 2.7 miles (4.3 km) south-southwest of the village of Luxemburg.
