= Darbellay =

Darbellay is a surname. Notable people with the surname include:

- Christophe Darbellay (born 1971), Swiss politician
- Joseph E. Darbellay (1845–1900), American merchant and politician
- Jean-Luc Darbellay (born 1946), Swiss composer, conductor, clarinetist and physician

== See also ==
- Darbellay, Wisconsin (today's name Bay View), is an unincorporated community in the town of Red River, Wisconsin, Kewaunee County, Wisconsin, United States
