= Ellisville, Wisconsin =

- Unincorporated community
- Location within Wisconsin Location within the United States
- Coordinates: 44°27′28″N 87°41′03″W
- Country: United States
- State: Wisconsin
- County: Kewaunee
- Town: Montpelier
- Elevation: 781 ft (238 m)
- Time zone: UTC-6 (Central (CST))
  - Summer (DST): UTC-5 (CDT)
- Area code: 920
- GNIS feature ID: 1564548

Ellisville is an unincorporated community in the town of Montpelier, Kewaunee County, Wisconsin, United States. It sits at the junction of County Highways AB and F, 6 miles (10 km) south of the village of Luxemburg. The George Halada Farmstead, which is listed on the National Register of Historic Places, is in Ellisville.
