= Steve Okoniewski =

American football player (1949–2024)

No. 88, 79, 73, 71
- Position: Defensive tackle

Personal information
- Born: August 22, 1949; Bremerton, Washington, U.S.
- Died: February 25, 2024 (aged 74); Bellevue, Wisconsin, U.S.
- Listed height: 6 ft 3 in (1.91 m)
- Listed weight: 257 lb (117 kg)

Career information
- High school: Central Kitsap (Silverdale, Washington)
- College: Washington, Montana
- NFL draft: 1972: 2nd round, 41st overall pick

Career history
- Buffalo Bills (1972–1973); Green Bay Packers (1974–1975); St. Louis Cardinals (1976–1977)

Awards and highlights
- Third-team Little All-American (1971)

Career NFL statistics
- Sacks: 4
- Fumble recoveries: 2
- Stats at Pro Football Reference

Steve Okoniewski (August 22, 1949 – February 25, 2024) was an American professional football player who was a defensive tackle for six seasons in the National Football League (NFL) for the Buffalo Bills, Green Bay Packers, and St. Louis Cardinals. Of Polish descent, he retired as principal from Luxemburg-Casco High School located in Luxemburg, Wisconsin and was a volunteer coach with that team's Spartans football program. Okoniewski died on February 25, 2024, at the age of 74.
