= Thiry Daems, Wisconsin =

- Unincorporated community
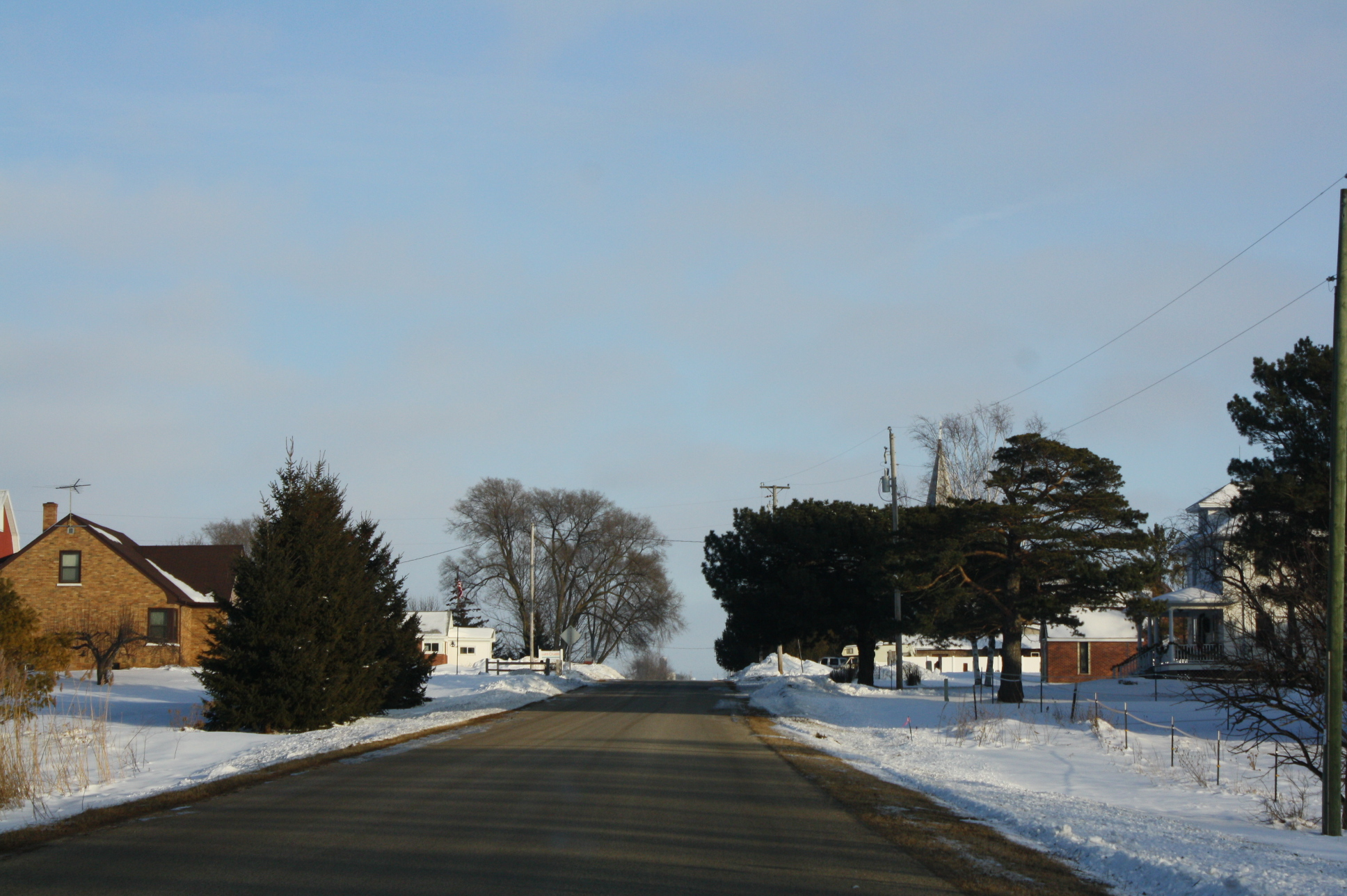
- Downtown Thiry Daems

- Location within Wisconsin Location within the United States
- Coordinates: 44°36′11″N 87°41′35″W
- Country: United States
- State: Wisconsin
- County: Kewaunee
- Town: Red River
- Elevation: 725 ft (221 m)
- Time zone: UTC-6 (Central (CST))
  - Summer (DST): UTC-5 (CDT)
- Area code: 920
- GNIS feature ID: 1575365

Thiry Daems (/ˈθiːri ˈdeɪmz/ THEER-ee DAYMZ) is an unincorporated community in the town of Red River, Kewaunee County, Wisconsin, United States. Thiry Daems is 4 miles (6 km) north of the village of Luxemburg. The community was settled by Belgian immigrants and was named for a surveyor named Constant Thiry and a priest called Father Daems.

== History ==
At one time, Thiry Daems had two saloons, a grocery store, cheese factory, blacksmith shop, and even a post office.

St. Odile's church closed in 1992. The first church there was built in 1858. The parish was established by Fr. Edward Daems. He was instrumental in causing immigrating Belgians to settle on land in the vicinity of the Bay Settlement and Door Peninsula. Some of his followers insisted that the settlement be named after Fr. Daems. Others wanted to name it in honor of Constant Thiry, who donated land to build St. Odile's. As a compromise, Thiry Daems was chosen.

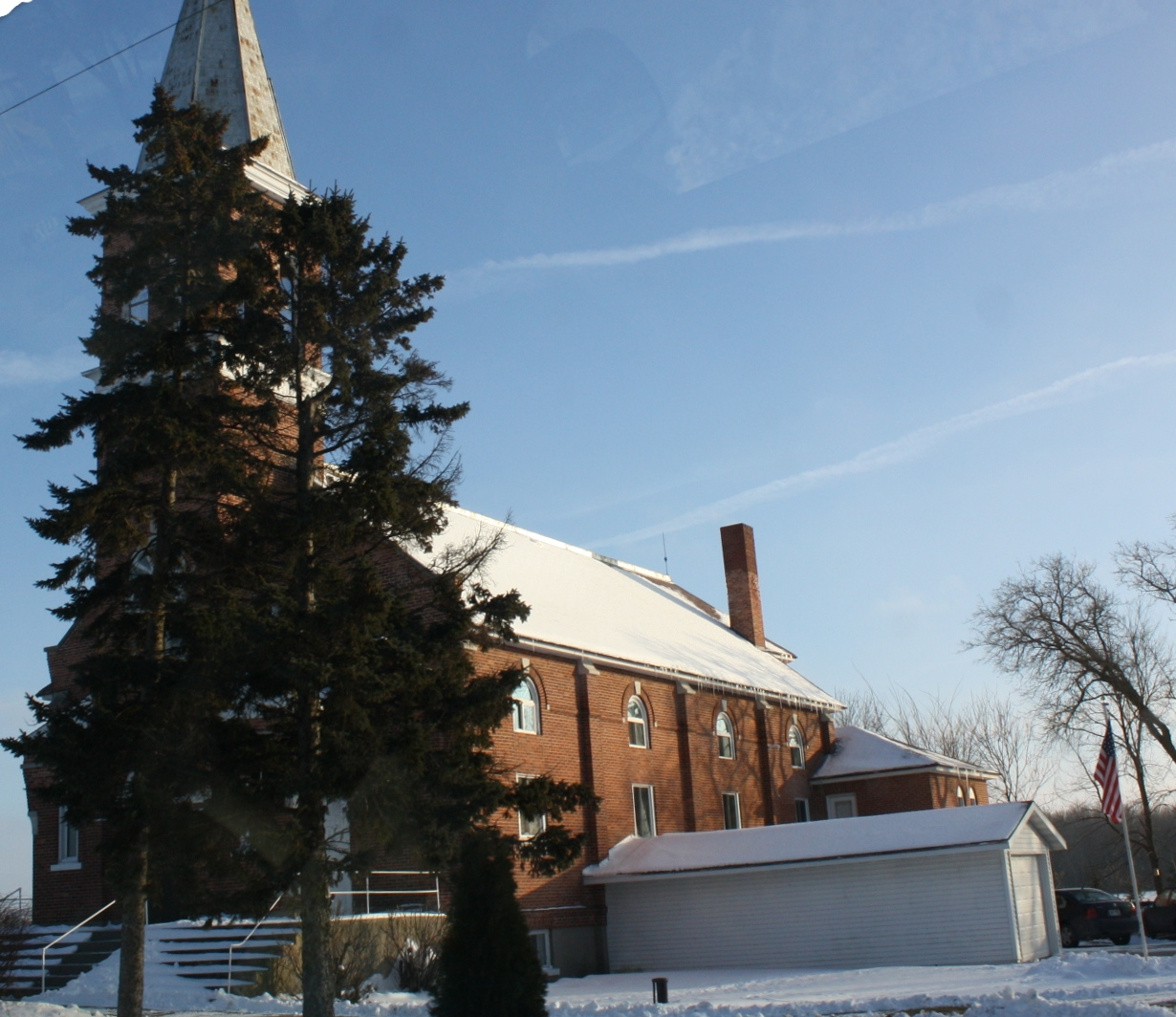
St. Odile Catholic Church in Thiry Daems

== History ==
At one time, Theiry Daems had two saloons, a grocery store, cheese factory, blacksmith shop, and even a post office.

St. Odile's church closed in 1992. The first church there was built in 1858. The parish was established br Fr. Edward Daems. He was instrumental in causing immigrating Belgian's to settle on land in the vicinity of the Bay Settlement and Door Peninsula. Some of his followers insisted that the settlement be named after Fr. Daems. Others wanted to name it in honor of Constant Thiry, who donated land to build St. Odile's. As a compromise, Thiry Daems was chosen.
