= Walhain, Wisconsin =

- Unincorporated community
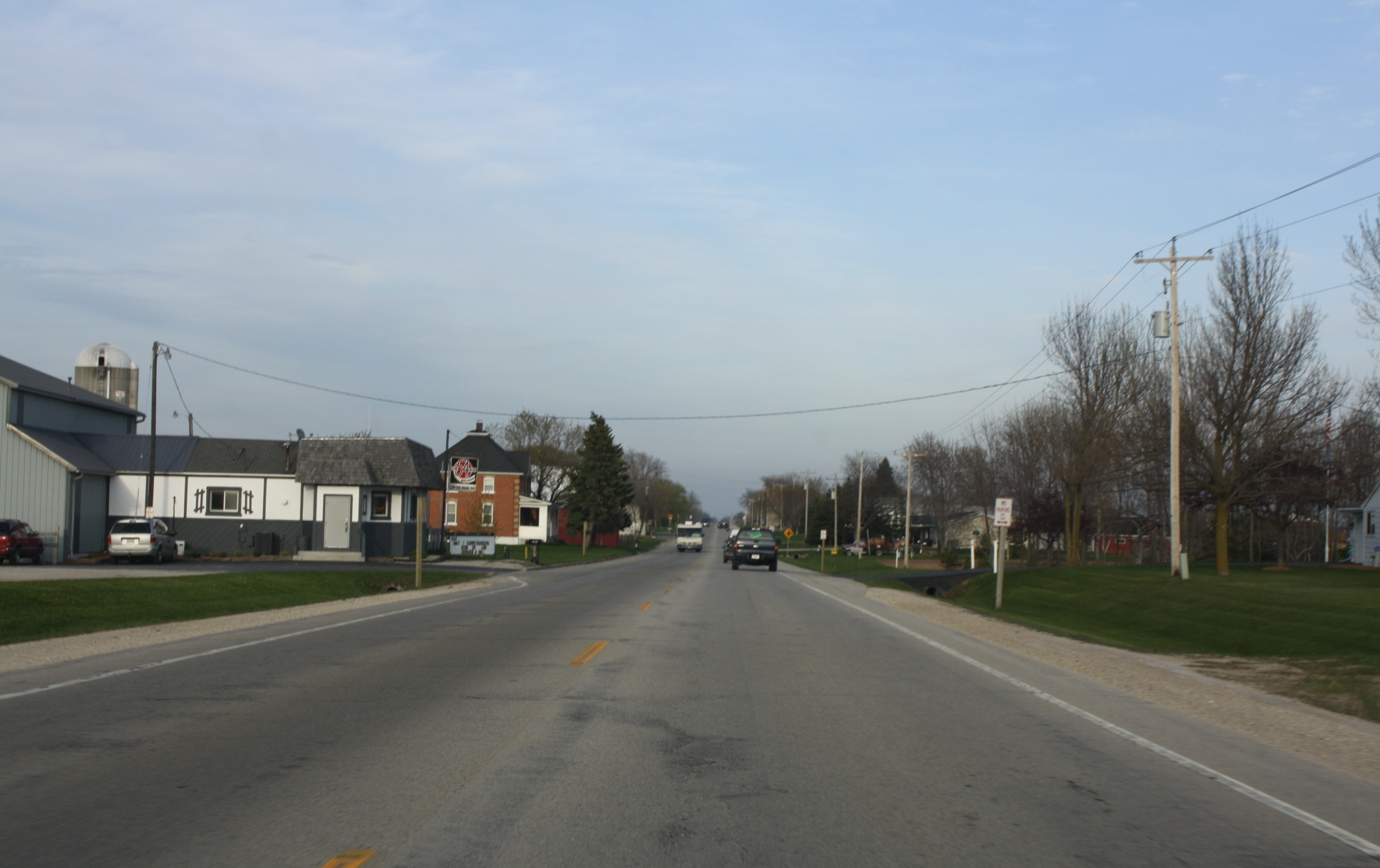
- Looking east at Walhain

- Location within Wisconsin Location within the United States
- Coordinates: 44°32′43″N 87°45′15″W
- Country: United States
- State: Wisconsin
- County: Kewaunee
- Town: Luxemburg
- Elevation: 784 ft (239 m)
- Time zone: UTC-6 (Central (CST))
  - Summer (DST): UTC-5 (CDT)
- Area code: 920

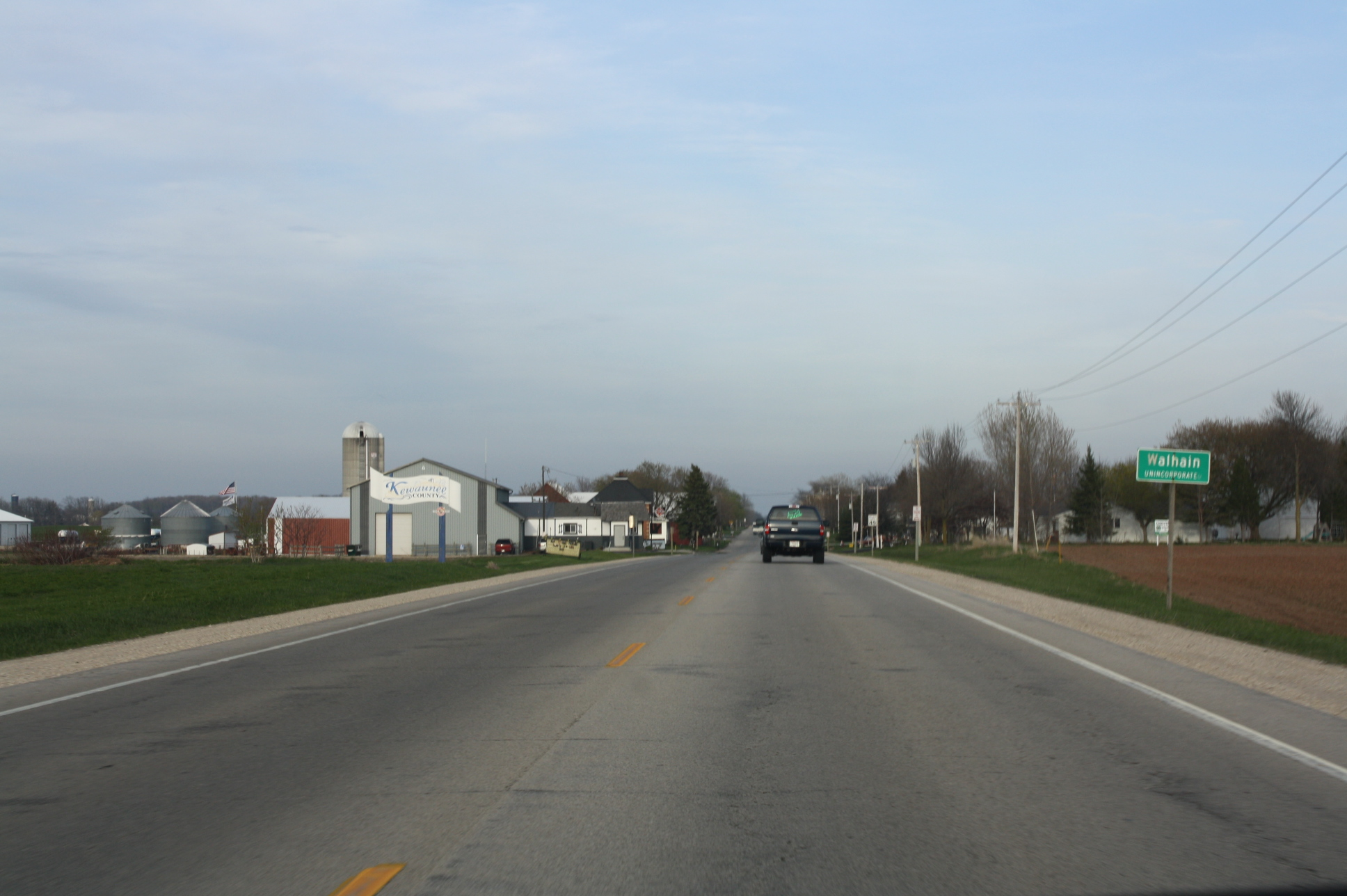
Looking east at the welcome sign for Walhain along WIS 54

Walhain (/ˈwɑːleɪn/ WAH-layn) is an unincorporated community in Kewaunee County, Wisconsin, United States, within the town of Luxemburg. The community is located at the intersection of Walhain Road and Wisconsin Highway 54, approximately two miles west of Luxemburg. It is located at 44.545 latitude and -87.754 longitude at an elevation of 784 feet (239 m) above sea level. The community was named by Florian Streyckman, who settled there in 1856 and came from Walhain, a municipality in Belgium.
