= Tim Jorgensen =

American baseball player

- Shortstop
- Born: November 30, 1972 (age 53); Luxemburg, Wisconsin
- Bats: Left Throws: Right
- Stats at Baseball Reference

Member of the National College

Baseball Hall of Fame
- Induction: 2012

Tim Scott Jorgensen (born November 30, 1972) is an American former professional baseball player and high school baseball coach. As a college baseball player for the University of Wisconsin–Oshkosh, Jorgensen set Division III all-time records for most home runs in a single season and for most career home runs. He played professional baseball until 1999 and was later inducted into the National College Baseball Hall of Fame.

== Career ==
=== College baseball ===
After graduating from Luxemburg-Casco High School, Tim Jorgensen enrolled at the University of Wisconsin–Oshkosh, where he played college baseball for the Wisconsin–Oshkosh Titans of the National Collegiate Athletic Association in Division III. Jorgensen played shortstop. In 1994, his junior year, he was named the Division III player of the year by the American Baseball Coaches Association, and he was named a Division III All-American. UW-Oshkosh won the 1994 Division III national championship. In 1994, he played collegiate summer baseball with the Falmouth Commodores of the Cape Cod Baseball League.

The San Diego Padres drafted Jorgensen in the 28th round of the 1994 Major League Baseball draft. After considering San Diego's offer, Jorgensen opted to return to Wisconsin–Oshkosh for his senior season. In his senior season, Jorgensen set the Division III record for home runs in a season, with 39. He also set the career home run record with 70, surpassing the 58 of John Deutsch of Montclair State University. (Note: The career home run record has since been tied by Jose Cortez.) Jorgensen's 1995 campaign also set Division III single-season records in grand slams (6), runs batted in (121), slugging percentage (1.275) and total bases (218).

=== Professional baseball ===
Jorgensen was an eighth-round selection by the Cleveland Indians in the 1995 Major League Baseball draft. He played three seasons of minor league baseball before sustaining an injury in 1998. He finished his professional baseball career with the Pittsburgh Pirates organization in 1999.

== Personal ==
In 2012, Jorgensen became the first player from the Wisconsin Intercollegiate Athletic Conference (WIAC) elected to the National College Baseball Hall of Fame. He was inducted with a class that included Nomar Garciaparra and Lou Brock.

Jorgensen works for Associated Bank in Green Bay. He served as baseball coach for Ashwaubenon High School in Ashwaubenon, Wisconsin for four seasons. His older brother, Terry Jorgensen, also attended UW-Oshkosh and then played in Major League Baseball.
