= Frog Station, Wisconsin =

- Unincorporated community
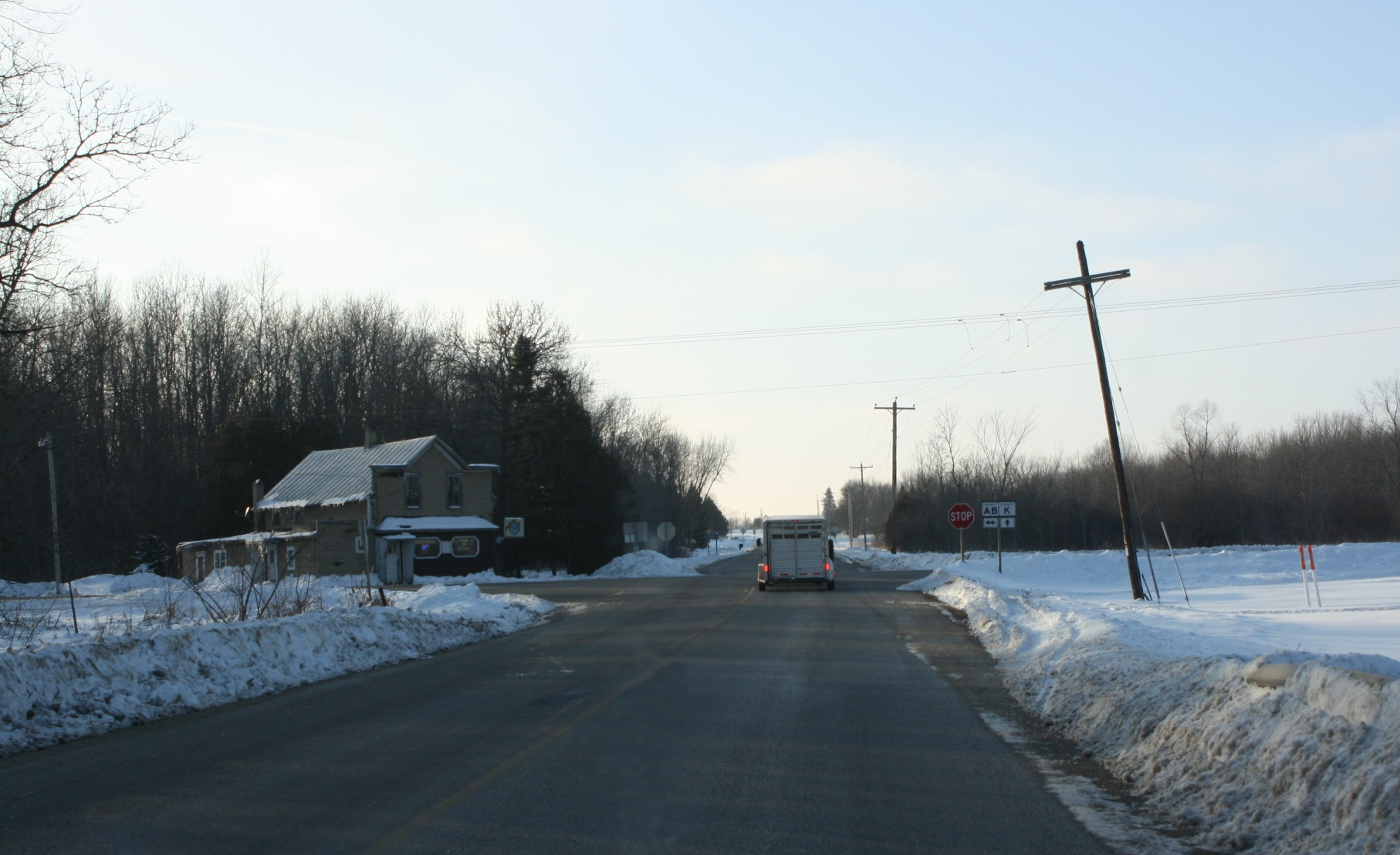
- Looking west at downtown Frog Station

- Location within Wisconsin Location within the United States
- Coordinates: 44°35′20″N 87°42′12″W
- Country: United States
- State: Wisconsin
- County: Kewaunee
- Towns: Luxemburg, Red River
- Elevation: 676 ft (206 m)
- Time zone: UTC-6 (Central (CST))
  - Summer (DST): UTC-5 (CDT)
- Area code: 920
- GNIS feature ID: 1565352

Frog Station is an unincorporated community in the towns of Red River and Luxemburg, in Kewaunee County, Wisconsin, United States. It sits at the junction of County Trunk K and County Trunk AB, approximately 3.5 miles (5.6 km) north of the village of Luxemburg.

== Notes ==
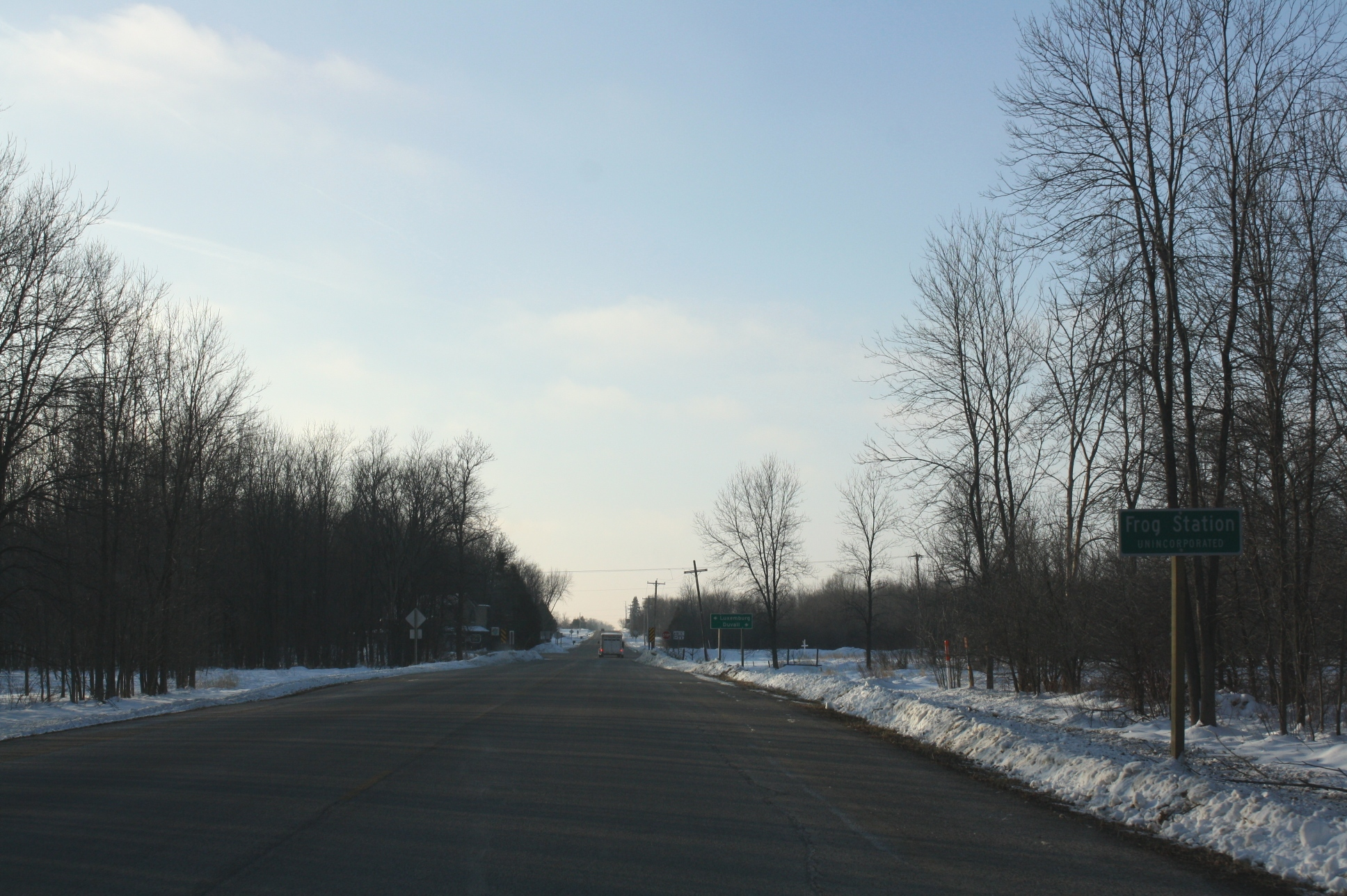
Frog Station sign
