= Stan Kuick =

American football player (1904–1977)

Stanley Jacob Kuick (April 24, 1904 – August 26, 1977) was an American football player. He played for the Milwaukee Badgers of the National Football League (NFL) in 1926 as a guard. Kuick played college football at Beloit College.

== Biography ==
Kuick was born on April 24, 1904, in Kewaunee, Wisconsin.
