= Bay View, Kewaunee County, Wisconsin =

Bay View, Wisconsin
- Unincorporated community
- Location within Wisconsin Location within the United States
- Coordinates: 44°37′58″N 87°44′39″W
- Country: United States
- State: Wisconsin
- County: Kewaunee
- Town: Red River
- Elevation: 725 ft (221 m)
- Time zone: UTC-6 (Central (CST))
  - Summer (DST): UTC-5 (CDT)
- Area code: 920
- GNIS feature ID: 1561322

Bay View (formerly Darbellay) is an unincorporated community in the town of Red River, Wisconsin, Kewaunee County, Wisconsin, United States.

== History ==
A post office was established at the community, located at the junction of County Roads S and SS on July 8, 1887, and closed in 1902.

In the 1800s, Darbellay was named for local resident, postmaster and fire recovery specialist Joseph E. Darbellay.
