= Tonet, Wisconsin =

- Unincorporated community
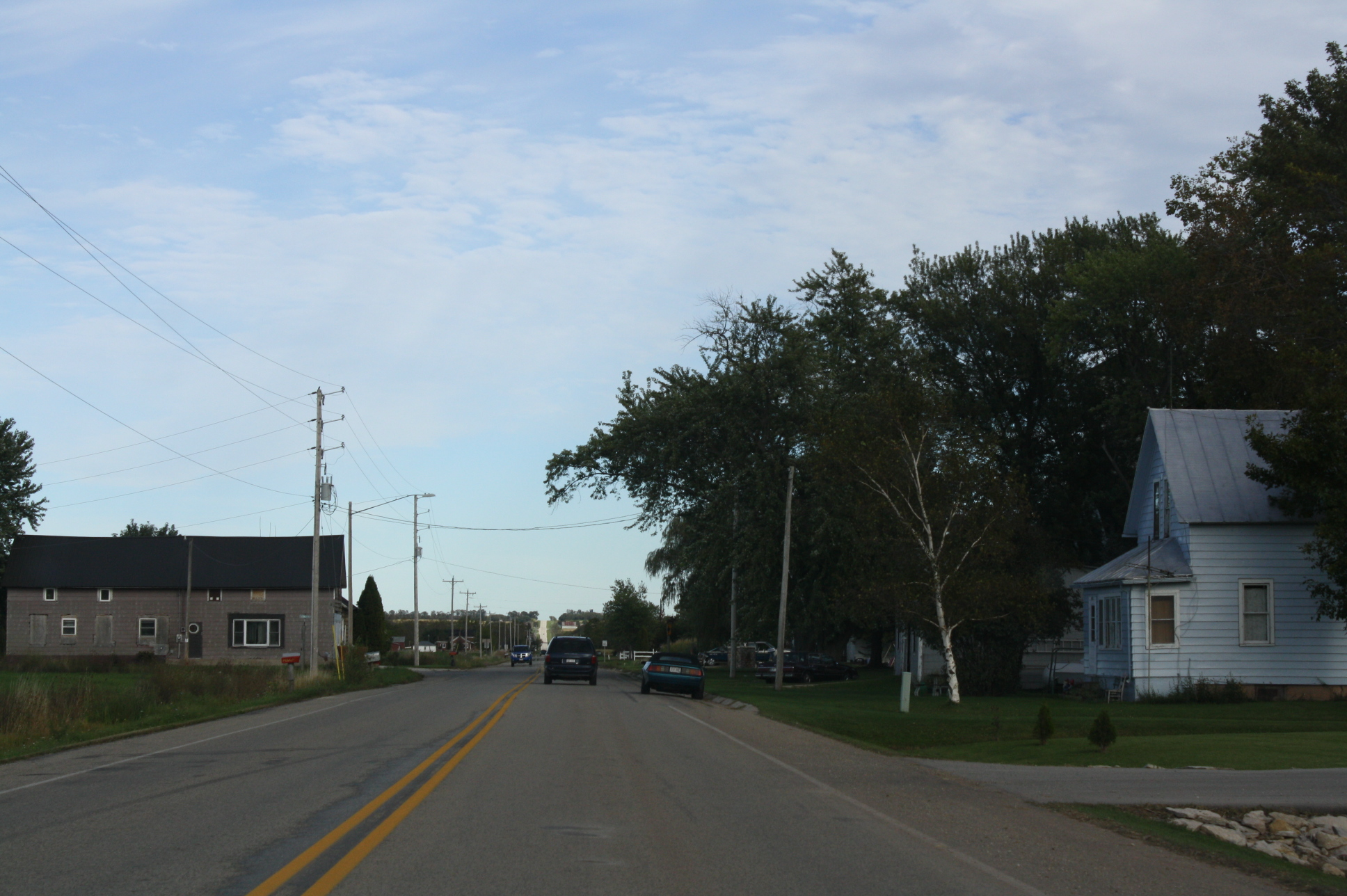
- Looking east at downtown Tonet

- Location within Wisconsin Location within the United States
- Coordinates: 44°35′21″N 87°44′01″W
- Country: United States
- State: Wisconsin
- County: Kewaunee
- Towns: Red River, Luxemburg
- Elevation: 718 ft (219 m)
- Time zone: UTC-6 (Central (CST))
  - Summer (DST): UTC-5 (CDT)
- Area code: 920
- GNIS feature ID: 1575506

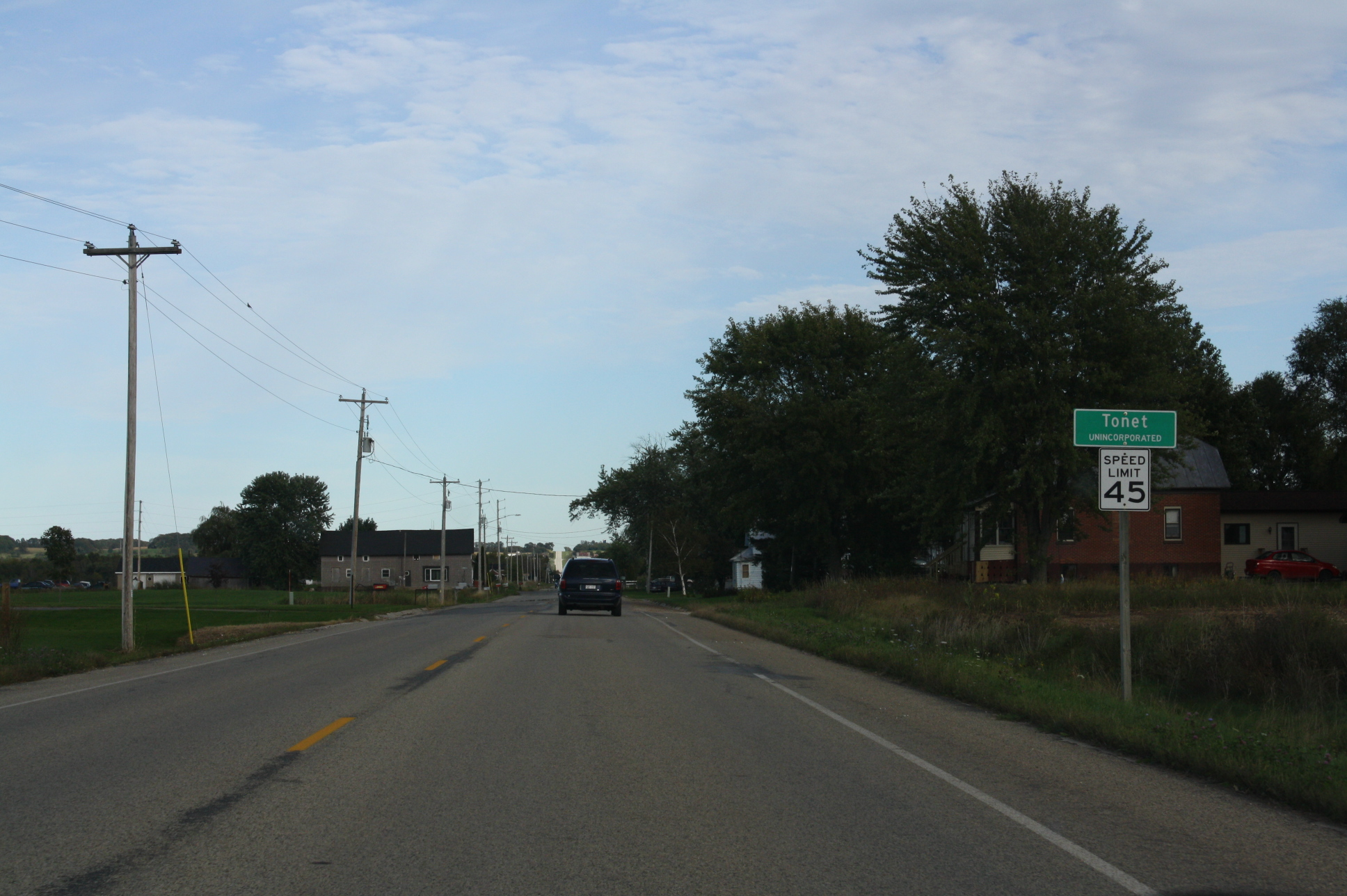
Tonet's welcome sign

Tonet (/toʊˈnɛt/ toh-NET) is an unincorporated community in the towns of Red River and Luxemburg, Kewaunee County, Wisconsin, United States. It is located at latitude 44.589 and longitude -87.734, with a mean elevation of 718 feet (219 m), at the junction of County Trunk K and Tonet Road.

== History ==
The community started as the neighboring community later to be called Champion grew. When the original log church of St. Joseph at Champion was destroyed by fire in 1874, a dispute then arose between the Flemish and the Walloon Belgians, as to where to rebuild the church. As a result of the disagreement, the Flemish Belgians built their own church on the site of St. Martin Catholic Church, Tonet, which has since been taken down.

Initially when it was established as a community, the place was known as Martinsville, after St. Martin's church. Prior to this it was referred to in letters as "Aux Flamands."

The proposed post office in 1887 was supposed to be named Jonet, after Peter Jonet, the first postmaster. However, the clerk in charge of the postmaster appointments department mistook the J for a T.
