= L. Albert Karel =

American politician

L. Albert Karel (April 17, 1875 – July 26, 1965) was an American politician and lawyer.

Born in Kewaunee, Wisconsin, Karel graduated from Kewaunee High School in 1892. In 1896, Karel graduated from the University of Wisconsin with a law degree. He practiced law in Kewaunee, Wisconsin and was in the banking business. He also owned and published the Kewaunee Enterprise and the Luxemburg News newspapers. He also served as the Kewaunee city attorney and on the Kewaunee County, Wisconsin Board of Supervisors. Karel served on the Kewaunee Board of Education and on the Kewaunee Normal School Board. In 1903, Karel served in the Wisconsin State Assembly and was a Democrat. Karel died at his home in Kewaunee, Wisconsin.
