= Montpelier, Wisconsin =

- Town
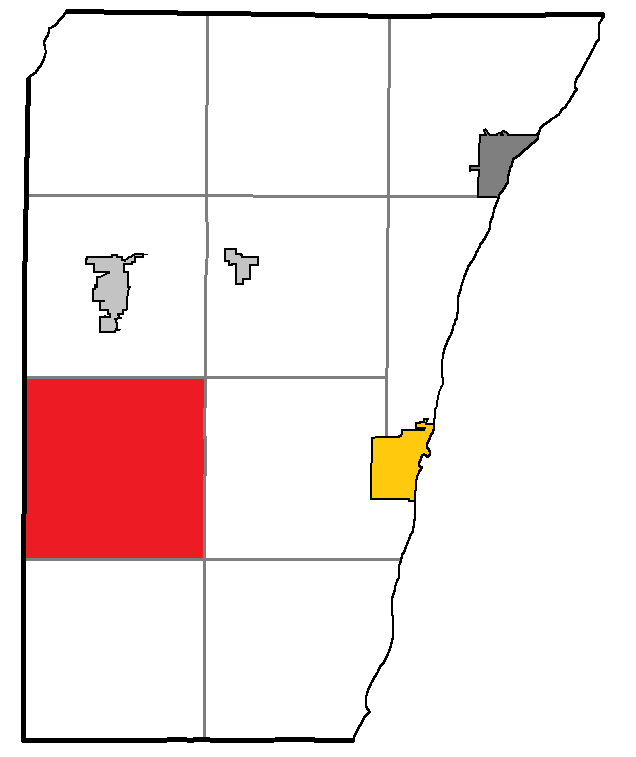
- Location of Montpelier, within Kewaunee County
- Coordinates: 44°27′19″N 87°42′24″W
- Country: United States
- State: Wisconsin
- County: Kewaunee

Area
  - Total: 36.15 sq mi (93.62 km^{2})
  - Land: 36.14 sq mi (93.59 km^{2})
  - Water: 0.012 sq mi (0.03 km^{2})
- Elevation: 915 ft (279 m)

Population (2020)
  - Total: 1,362
  - Density: 37.69/sq mi (14.55/km^{2})
- Time zone: UTC-6 (Central (CST))
  - Summer (DST): UTC-5 (CDT)
- Area code: 920
- FIPS code: 55-54050
- GNIS feature ID: 1583748
- Website: townofmontpelier.com

Montpelier (/mɒntˈpiːljər/ mont-PEEL-yər) is a town in Kewaunee County, Wisconsin, United States. The population was 1,362 at the 2020 census.

== Communities ==
- Cherneyville is an unincorporated community located at the intersection of Cherneyville Road and Stodola Road.
- Ellisville is an unincorporated community located at the intersection of County Road AB (former WIS 163) and County Road F. The George Halada Farmstead, which is listed on the National Register of Historic Places, is in Ellisville.
- Pilsen is an unincorporated community located mostly along WIS 29 at the latter's intersection with County Road V.
- Neuern is an unincorporated community located at the intersection of County Road N and V split between the town's border with the town of Luxemburg.

== Geography ==
Montpelier is on the western side of Kewaunee County, bordered to the west by Brown County. According to the United States Census Bureau, the town has a total area of 36.1 square miles (93.6 km^{2}), of which 0.01 square miles (0.03 km^{2}), or 0.03%, are water.

== Demographics ==
As of the census of 2000, there were 1,371 people, 482 households, and 382 families residing in the town. The population density was 37.9 people per square mile (14.6/km^{2}). There were 492 housing units at an average density of 13.6 per square mile (5.3/km^{2}). The racial makeup of the town was 99.12% White, 0.29% Native American, 0.22% from other races, and 0.36% from two or more races. Hispanic or Latino of any race were 0.22% of the population.

There were 482 households, out of which 37.8% had children under the age of 18 living with them, 70.3% were married couples living together, 4.6% had a female householder with no husband present, and 20.7% were non-families. 18.5% of all households were made up of individuals, and 9.3% had someone living alone who was 65 years of age or older. The average household size was 2.84 and the average family size was 3.25.

In the town, the population was spread out, with 27.5% under the age of 18, 9.0% from 18 to 24, 29.2% from 25 to 44, 23.0% from 45 to 64, and 11.2% who were 65 years of age or older. The median age was 36 years. For every 100 females, there were 110.0 males. For every 100 females age 18 and over, there were 110.6 males.

The median income for a household in the town was $51,000, and the median income for a family was $54,545. Males had a median income of $32,414 versus $22,422 for females. The per capita income for the town was $19,812. About 1.7% of families and 3.8% of the population were below the poverty line, including 2.3% of those under age 18 and 10.4% of those age 65 or over.
