= Tallest Grandfather Clock =

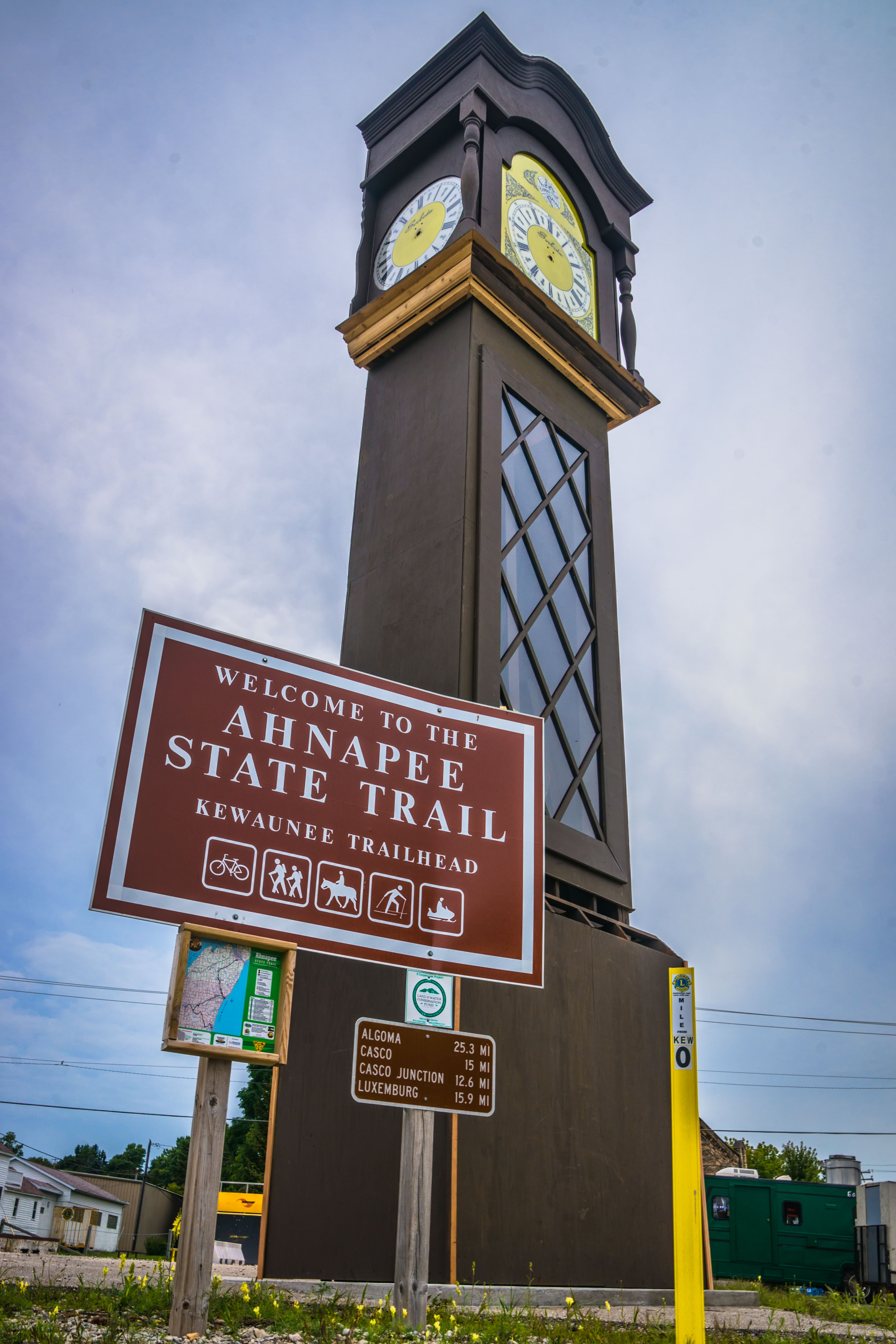
- World's Tallest Grandfather Clock

- Location within Wisconsin
- 44°27′36″N 87°30′13″W
- Location: Kewaunee, Wisconsin

Site notes
- Governing body: City of Kewaunee

The World's Tallest Grandfather Clock is a roadside attraction in downtown Kewaunee, Wisconsin. It is a 36-foot-tall Colonial-style redwood grandfather clock built in 1976. It is located at the Ahnapee State Trail trailhead.

== History ==
The clock was designed by Richard Kohrt, the owner of furniture store Svoboda Industries, and built in 1976 by father and son Jake and Rodney Schlies. The clock was intended to promote Svoboda Industries locally as well as draw in tourists.

It was relocated to the northeast side of Kewaunee in 1984 when Svoboda Industries moved to allow the construction of a bridge. The new shop eventually closed and the clock sat unmaintained for over a decade, eventually being sold to the Kewaunee County Sheriff's Department.

In 2013, a local movement was started by Jason Jelinek to restore and relocate the clock. Following a unanimous vote by the city council, restoration efforts began. The restoration was made possible entirely by public fundraising and volunteer work. At 1 p.m. local time on July 30, 2014, the clock was synchronized and started in its new location at the Ahnapee State Trail trailhead.

== Clock ==
The clock stands at a height of 35 ft 10 in (10.92 m) and is claimed to be the largest grandfather clock in the world.

Repairs were made following the restoration movement, including a rebuilt frame, timekeeping mechanism tuneup, and newly added chimes.
