= Bernard Hahn =

American politician

Bernard "Barney" Hahn (August 24, 1860 – September 6, 1931) was a farmer and a politician.

Born in Luxemburg, Kewaunee County, Wisconsin, Hahn went to public school. He moved with his parents to Sturgeon Bay, Wisconsin where they owned a hotel. Later, Hahn built the first opera house in Sturgeon Bay. Hahn was a farmer and grew fruit. He lived in Fish Creek, Door County, Wisconsin. Hahn served in the Wisconsin State Assembly and was a Republican. Hahn died in a hospital in Sturgeon Bay, Wisconsin from complications after surgery. In 1931, Hahn was charged with arson for setting fire to his personal property; the arson case ended when he died.
