= Luxemburg (town), Wisconsin =

Town in Wisconsin, United States

Luxemburg, Wisconsin
- Town
- Town of Luxemburg
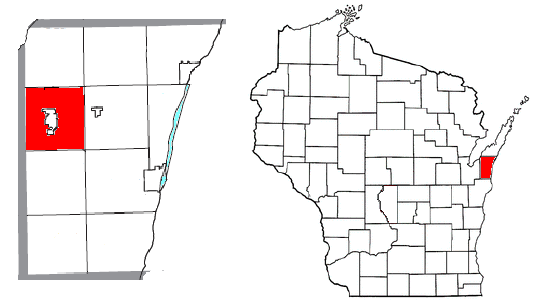
- Location of Luxemburg, within Kewaunee County
- Coordinates: 44°31′24″N 87°40′23″W
- Country: United States
- State: Wisconsin
- County: Kewaunee

Area
  - Total: 33.8 sq mi (88 km^{2})
  - Land: 33.8 sq mi (88 km^{2})
  - Water: 0 sq mi (0 km^{2})

Population (2020)
  - Total: 1,458
  - Density: 43.1/sq mi (16.7/km^{2})
- Time zone: UTC-6 (Central (CST))
  - Summer (DST): UTC-5 (CDT)
- Area code(s): 920 & 274
- GNIS feature ID: 1583611

Luxemburg is a town in Kewaunee County, Wisconsin, United States. The population was 1,458 at the 2020 census. The village of Luxemburg, a separate municipality, is surrounded by the town. The unincorporated communities of Walhain and Casco Junction are in the town, and Neuern, Frog Station, and Tonet are partially in the town.

== Geography ==
Luxemburg is on the western side of Kewaunee County, bordered to the west by Brown County. According to the United States Census Bureau, the town has a total area of 34.0 square miles (88.1 km^{2}), all land.

== Demographics ==
As of the census of 2000, there were 1,402 people, 445 households, and 383 families residing in the town. The population density was 41.0 people per square mile (15.8/km^{2}). There were 459 housing units at an average density of 13.4 per square mile (5.2/km^{2}). The racial makeup of the town was 98.86% White, 0.14% Black or African American, 0.07% Asian, 0.50% from other races, and 0.43% from two or more races. 0.64% of the population were Hispanic or Latino of any race.

There were 445 households, out of which 45.8% had children under the age of 18 living with them, 77.3% were married couples living together, 5.2% had a female householder with no husband present, and 13.9% were non-families. 11.0% of all households were made up of individuals, and 5.4% had someone living alone who was 65 years of age or older. The average household size was 3.15 and the average family size was 3.41.

In the town, the population was spread out, with 31.4% under the age of 18, 8.3% from 18 to 24, 29.9% from 25 to 44, 22.0% from 45 to 64, and 8.4% who were 65 years of age or older. The median age was 33 years. For every 100 females, there were 101.1 males. For every 100 females age 18 and over, there were 100.0 males.

The median income for a household in the town was $54,875, and the median income for a family was $56,167. Males had a median income of $35,486 versus $23,348 for females. The per capita income for the town was $19,322. About 0.5% of families and 0.9% of the population were below the poverty line, including 0.2% of those under age 18 and 2.5% of those age 65 or over.

== Education ==
The town is home to the Luxemburg-Casco Primary, Intermediate, and High Schools (Luxemburg-Casco High School).
