= Red River, Kewaunee County, Wisconsin =

Red River, Wisconsin
- Town
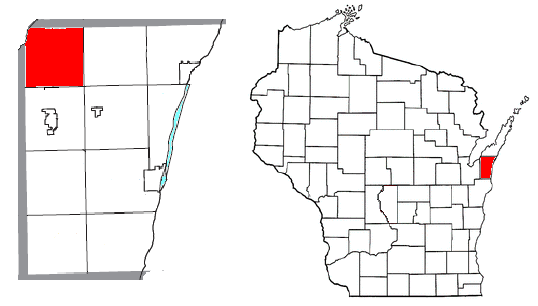
- Location of Red River, Wisconsin
- Coordinates: 44°37′57″N 87°42′08″W
- Country: United States
- State: Wisconsin
- County: Kewaunee

Government
  - Type: Select board
  - Chairman: Jeff Dorner
  - Supervisor #1: Paul Dalebroux
  - Supervisor #2: Steve LeGrave
  - Clerk: Char Duckart
  - Treasurer: Ken Bouchonville
  - Constable: Kevin Vandertie

Area
  - Total: 35.9 sq mi (93.0 km^{2})
  - Land: 34.7 sq mi (90.0 km^{2})
  - Water: 1.2 sq mi (3.0 km^{2})
- Elevation: 748 ft (228 m)

Population (2020)
  - Total: 1,374
  - Density: 39.5/sq mi (15.3/km^{2})
- Time zone: UTC-6 (Central (CST))
  - Summer (DST): UTC-5 (CDT)
- Area code: 920
- FIPS code: 55-66700
- GNIS feature ID: 1584003
- Website: townofredriverwis.gov

Red River is a town in Kewaunee County, Wisconsin, United States. The population was 1,374 at the 2020 census, down from 1,393 at the 2010 census. The unincorporated communities of Bay View, Duvall, Frog Station, Thiry Daems, and Tonet are located in the town. The census-designated place of Dyckesville is also located partially in the town.

== Geography ==
The town is in the northwestern corner of Kewaunee County; it is bordered to the north by Door County, to the west by Brown County, and to the northwest by Green Bay of Lake Michigan. According to the United States Census Bureau, the town has a total area of 35.9 square miles (93.0 km^{2}), of which 34.7 square miles (90.0 km^{2}) are land and 1.2 square miles (3.0 km^{2}), or 3.23%, are water.

The town was once the site of a large Native American community and today contains multiple archeological sites.

== Demographics ==
As of the census of 2000, there were 1,476 people, 528 households, and 419 families residing in the town. The population density was 42.5 people per square mile (16.4/km^{2}). There were 601 housing units at an average density of 17.3 per square mile (6.7/km^{2}). The racial makeup of the town was 98.98% White, 0.14% African American, 0.20% Native American, and 0.68% from two or more races. Hispanic or Latino of any race were 0.34% of the population.

There were 528 households, out of which 34.1% had children under the age of 18 living with them, 71.6% were married couples living together, 5.3% had a female householder with no husband present, and 20.5% were non-families. 15.9% of all households were made up of individuals, and 8.9% had someone living alone who was 65 years of age or older. The average household size was 2.79 and the average family size was 3.14.

In the town, the population was spread out, with 25.4% under the age of 18, 9.4% from 18 to 24, 27.6% from 25 to 44, 23.4% from 45 to 64, and 14.2% who were 65 years of age or older. The median age was 37 years. For every 100 females, there were 105.3 males. For every 100 females age 18 and over, there were 103.5 males.

The median income for a household in the town was $47,833, and the median income for a family was $55,250. Males had a median income of $35,571 versus $21,892 for females. The per capita income for the town was $19,673. About 3.5% of families and 6.1% of the population were below the poverty line, including 5.5% of those under age 18 and 9.8% of those age 65 or over.

=== Most Belgian-American towns ===
Red River is the second-most Belgian-American community in the United States, with 47% of its population reporting Belgian ancestry in 2000.

- 1) Union : 49%
- 2) Red River, Wisconsin (Kewaunee County) : 47%
- 3) Brussels (Door County) : 36.4% ( composed of "Brussels community" & "Namur Community")
- 4) Lincoln : 35.4%
- 5) Green Bay (Brown County) : 31.8% (including Champion)
