= Terry Jorgensen =

American baseball player

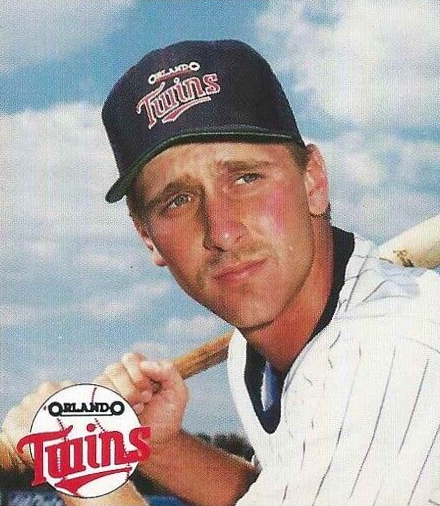
- Jorgensen with the Orlando Twins c. 1988
- Third baseman
- Born: September 2, 1966 (age 59); Kewaunee, Wisconsin
- Batted: Right Threw: Right

MLB debut
- September 10, 1989, for the Minnesota Twins

Last MLB appearance
- October 1, 1993, for the Minnesota Twins

MLB statistics
- Batting average: .240
- Home runs: 1
- Runs batted in: 19
- Stats at Baseball Reference

Teams
- Minnesota Twins (1989, 1992–1993)

Terry Allen Jorgensen (born September 2, 1966) is an American former professional baseball third baseman. He played in parts of three seasons in Major League Baseball for the Minnesota Twins between 1989 and 1993.

Terry was originally selected by the Twins in the 2nd round of the 1987 Major League Baseball draft out of the University of Wisconsin–Oshkosh. He started playing in 1989, when he played 10 games, but hit only .174 with 1 double. His best chance at regular major league playing time came in 1993, when he played in 59 games for the Twins, but he hit just .224 with 12 RBI, and he was released after the season. He played two seasons in the Florida Marlins organization, then one season for the independent Green Bay Sultans before retiring after the 1996 season.

After retirement as a player, he became the coach for his high school team at Luxemburg-Casco High School. His younger brother, Tim Jorgensen, also played for Wisconsin–Oshkosh.
