= George Halada Farmstead =

- U.S. National Register of Historic Places
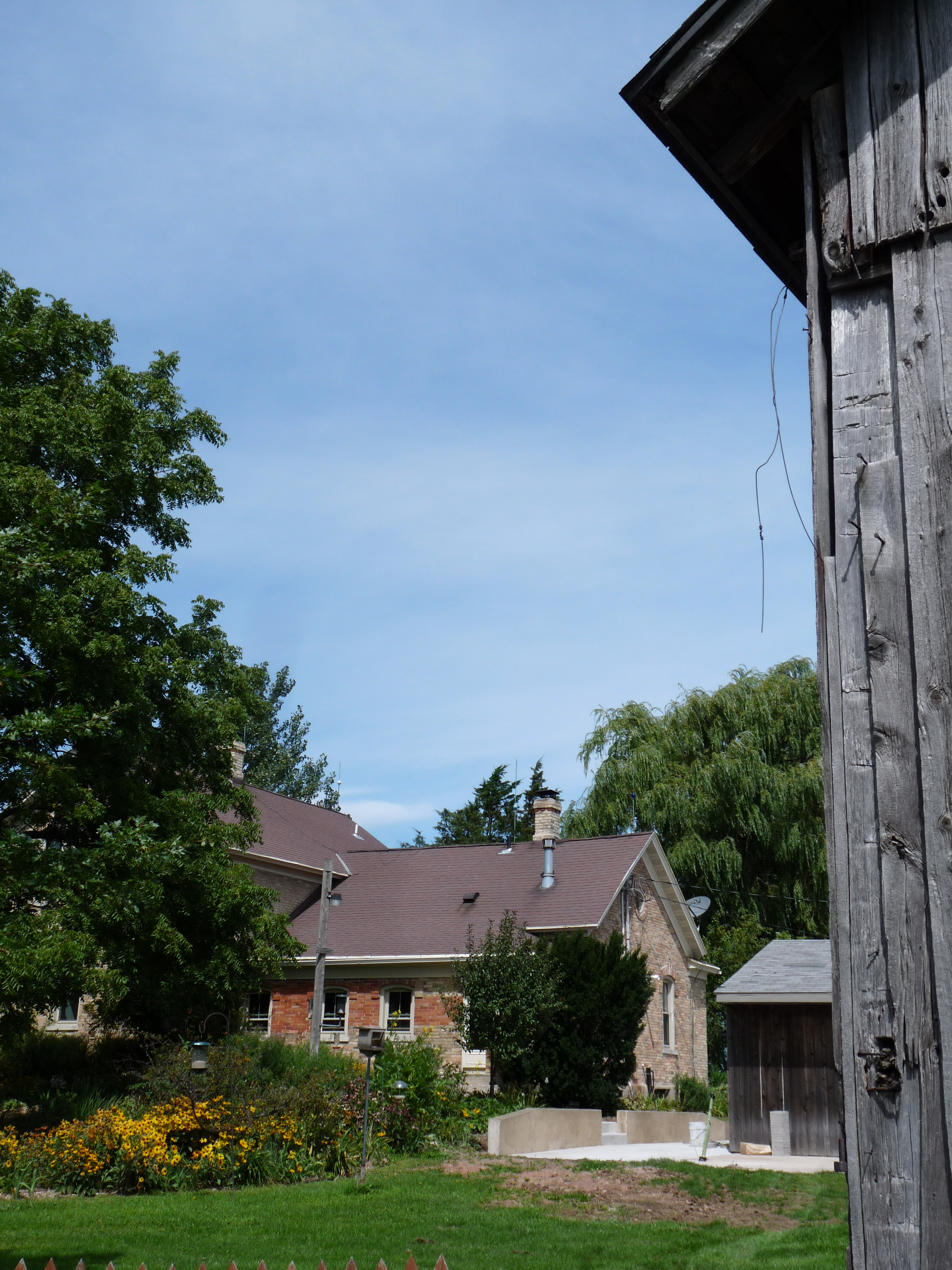
- Part of the farmstead.
- Nearest city: Ellisville, Wisconsin
- Coordinates: 44°27′25″N 87°42′51″W
- Area: 4.3 acres (1.7 ha)
- Architectural style: Italianate
- NRHP reference No.: 93000026
- Added to NRHP: February 11, 1993

The George Halada Farmstead is located in Ellisville, Wisconsin.

== History ==
George Halada was an immigrant from Bohemia. He would eventually acquire this property and operate it as a dairy farm. It remains in the family. The farm was added to the State Register of Historic Places in 1992 and to the National Register of Historic Places the following year.
