= Luxemburg-Casco High School =

High school in Luxemburg, Wisconsin, USA

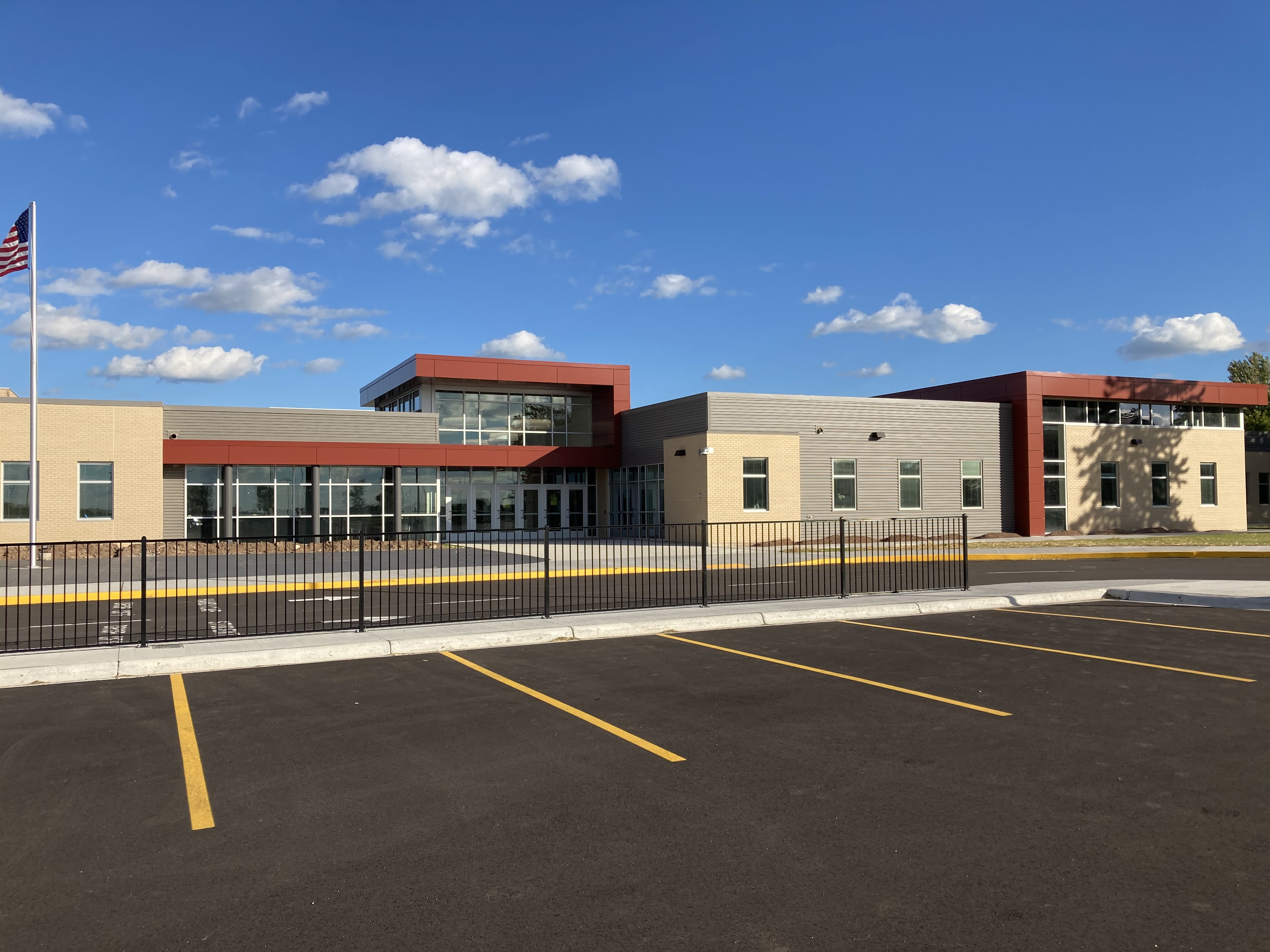

Location
- 512 Center Dr; Luxemburg, Wisconsin 54217; United States; 44.5462°N 87.7014°W

Information
- School type: Public High School
- Established: 1968
- School district: Luxemburg-Casco School District
- Principal: Tyson Tlachac
- Teaching staff: 39.50 (FTE)
- Grades: 9 through 12
- Enrollment: 661 (2024-2025)
- Student to teacher ratio: 16.73
- Color
- Athletics conference: North Eastern Conference
- Mascot: Spartans
- Rival: Denmark
- Website: https://high.luxcasco.k12.wi.us/

Luxemburg-Casco High School (known informally as L-C) is a public high school located in Luxemburg, Wisconsin, United States. It serves the greater Luxemburg-Casco area, and was founded in 1968 as a result of a merger between the school districts of Luxemburg and Casco.

== Athletics ==
L-C's athletic teams are known as the Spartans, and compete in the North Eastern Conference. The Spartans have won twenty-three WIAA state championships, tied with Wisconsin Rapids' Lincoln High School for eighteenth most in WIAA history.

State Championships (Division 2 unless otherwise noted, school was Class B until 1991)
| Sport | Year |
|---|---|
| Basketball (girls) | 1988, 1994, 2004 |
| Cross country (girls) | 1982, 1987, 1989, 1998, 2000 (Division 3) |
| Softball | 2009, 2010 |
| Volleyball (girls) | 2019, 2020, 2021 |
| Wrestling | 1992, 1994, 1996, 1999, 2001–2003, 2005, 2006, 2012, 2013, 2018, 2023, 2024 |

== Enrollment ==
From 2010 to 2025, high school enrollment inclined 5.8%.

Enrollment at Luxemburg–Casco High School, 2000–2019

== Protest ==
In 1964, the Lake to Lake dairy coop held its annual meeting at Luxemburg High School. Protestors from the National Farmers Organization dumped milk from a milk truck on the school grounds.

== Notable alumni ==
- Terry Jorgensen (class of 1984), professional baseball player
- Tim Jorgensen (class of 1991), member of the College Baseball Hall of Fame
- Brad Voyles (class of 1995), professional baseball player
