= Kewaunee, Wisconsin =

- City
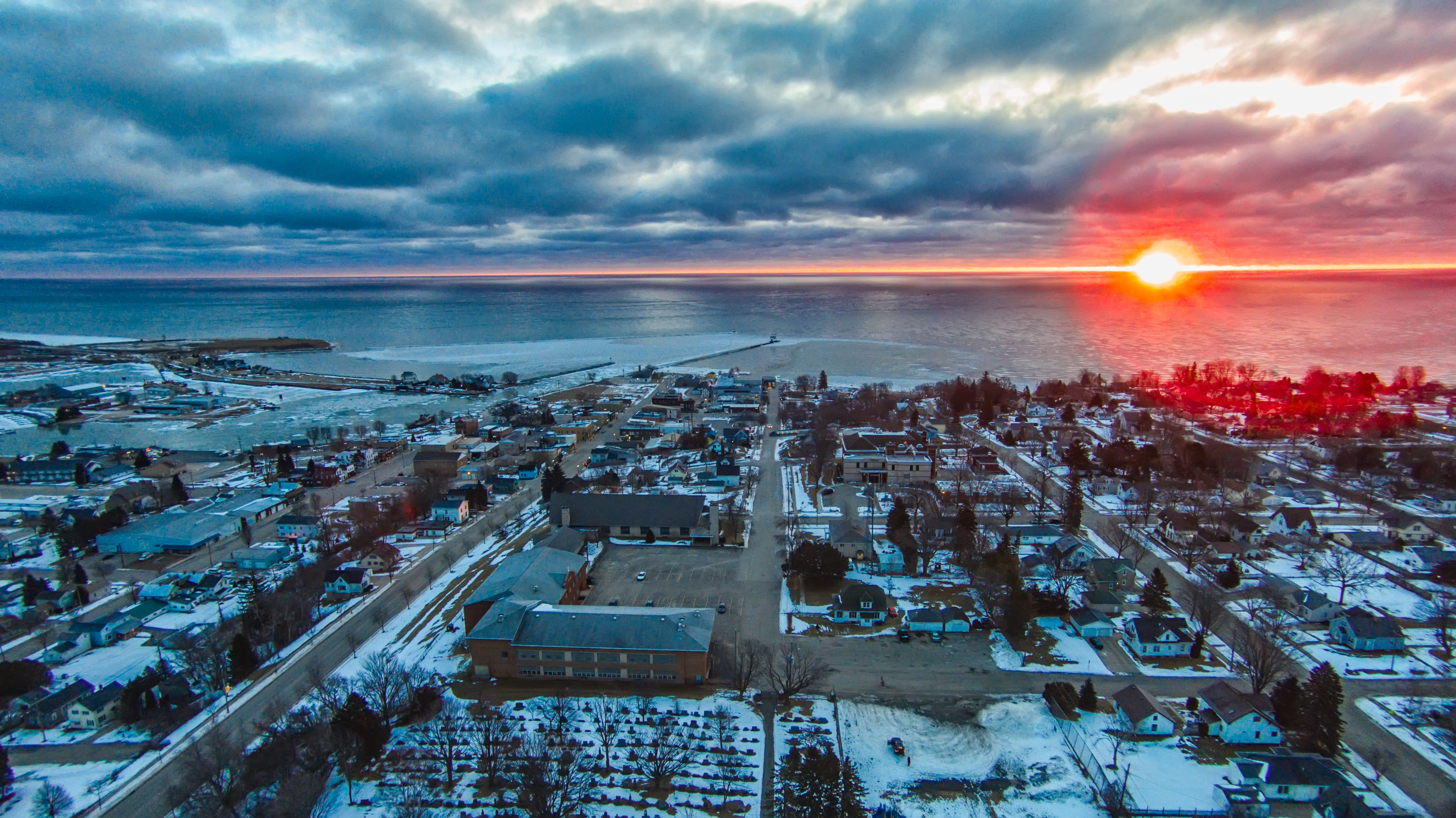
- Looking east to the Kewaunee harbor and Lake Michigan
- Motto: "Spirit of the Lakeshore"
- Location of Kewaunee in Kewaunee County, Wisconsin.

- Location within Wisconsin Location within the United States
- Coordinates: 44°27′32″N 87°30′34″W
- Country: United States
- State: Wisconsin
- County: Kewaunee

Government
  - Type: Municipality
  - Mayor: Jeff Vollenweider

Area
  - Total: 3.73 sq mi (9.66 km^{2})
  - Land: 3.53 sq mi (9.15 km^{2})
  - Water: 0.20 sq mi (0.52 km^{2})
- Elevation: 610 ft (186 m)

Population (2020)
  - Total: 2,837
  - Density: 803/sq mi (310.2/km^{2})
- Time zone: UTC-6 (Central (CST))
  - Summer (DST): UTC-5 (CDT)
- ZIP code: 54216
- Area code: 920
- FIPS code: 55-39350
- GNIS feature ID: 1567445
- Website: cityofkewauneewi.gov

Kewaunee is a city in Kewaunee County, Wisconsin, United States. The population was 2,837 at the 2020 census. Located on the northwestern shore of Lake Michigan, the city is the county seat of Kewaunee County. Its Menominee name is Kewāneh, an archaic name for a species of duck. Kewaunee is part of the Green Bay metropolitan area.

== History ==
Kewaunee was the site of a Potawatomi village at the time of European contact in the 17th century. French Jesuit missionary Jacques Marquette celebrated All Saints Day at the Potawatomi village in 1674. Later, French explorer René-Robert Cavelier, Sieur de La Salle visited the village in 1679, and Canadian Jesuit Jean-François Buisson de Saint-Cosme stopped in September 1698. The Potawatomis moved south and east along Lake Michigan in the eighteenth century, and the area was reclaimed by Menominee people. Trader Jacques Vieau established a short lived trading post for the North West Company in the area of Kewaunee in 1795. The United States acquired the land from the Menominee nation in the 1831 Treaty of Washington.

The current settlement at Kewaunee began in 1836, when false rumors of gold deposits in the Kewaunee River triggered a minor gold rush of Yankee settlers. Land speculator Joshua Hathaway surveyed and platted the settlement. When no gold was found, the settlers who remained established a sawmill and developed the local harbor for the lumber industry. Kewaunee became the county seat of Kewaunee County at the time of the county's formation in 1852. In the late 19th century, the community attracted many Czech and German immigrants.

== Geography ==
Kewaunee is located at 44°27′32″N 87°30′34″W (44.458758, -87.509496).

According to the United States Census Bureau, the city has a total area of 3.73 square miles (9.66 km^{2}), of which 3.53 square miles (9.14 km^{2}) is land and 0.2 square miles (0.52 km^{2}) is water.

=== Highways ===
- WIS 42 Northbound travels to Algoma, Wisconsin. South it continues into Two Rivers and Manitowoc, Wisconsin.
- WIS 29 connects with Green Bay, Wisconsin westbound.

=== Climate ===
Climate data for Kewaunee, Wisconsin (1991–2020)
Month	Jan	Feb	Mar	Apr	May	Jun	Jul	Aug	Sep	Oct	Nov	Dec	Year
Mean daily maximum °F (°C)	26.1 (−3.3)	28.8 (−1.8)	37.7 (3.2)	48.4 (9.1)	59.8 (15.4)	70.2 (21.2)	76.3 (24.6)	75.3 (24.1)	68.1 (20.1)	55.3 (12.9)	42.8 (6.0)	31.5 (−0.3)	51.7 (10.9)
Daily mean °F (°C)	19.3 (−7.1)	21.3 (−5.9)	30.4 (−0.9)	41.3 (5.2)	52.0 (11.1)	62.3 (16.8)	68.2 (20.1)	67.6 (19.8)	60.1 (15.6)	48.2 (9.0)	36.2 (2.3)	25.4 (−3.7)	44.4 (6.9)
Mean daily minimum °F (°C)	12.4 (−10.9)	13.8 (−10.1)	23.2 (−4.9)	34.2 (1.2)	44.1 (6.7)	54.4 (12.4)	60.2 (15.7)	59.8 (15.4)	52.1 (11.2)	41.0 (5.0)	29.5 (−1.4)	19.3 (−7.1)	37.0 (2.8)
Average precipitation inches (mm)	1.48 (38)	1.05 (27)	1.66 (42)	2.98 (76)	3.30 (84)	3.77 (96)	3.60 (91)	3.42 (87)	3.10 (79)	2.91 (74)	2.17 (55)	1.64 (42)	31.08 (791)
Average snowfall inches (cm)	13.5 (34)	12.6 (32)	6.2 (16)	2.4 (6.1)	0.0 (0.0)	0.0 (0.0)	0.0 (0.0)	0.0 (0.0)	0.0 (0.0)	0.2 (0.51)	2.2 (5.6)	11.0 (28)	48.1 (122.21)
Source: NOAA

== Demographics ==
Historical population
Census	Pop.	Note	%±
1880	1,050		—
1890	1,216		15.8%
1900	1,773		45.8%
1910	1,839		3.7%
1920	1,865		1.4%
1930	2,409		29.2%
1940	2,533		5.1%
1950	2,583		2.0%
1960	2,772		7.3%
1970	2,901		4.7%
1980	2,801		−3.4%
1990	2,750		−1.8%
2000	2,806		2.0%
2010	2,952		5.2%
2020	2,837		−3.9%
U.S. Decennial Census

=== 2020 census ===
As of the census of 2020, the population was 2,837. The population density was 803.5 inhabitants per square mile (310.2/km^{2}). There were 1,416 housing units at an average density of 401.0 per square mile (154.8/km^{2}). The racial makeup of the city was 91.5% White, 0.5% Black or African American, 0.5% Asian, 0.5% Native American, 1.9% from other races, and 5.1% from two or more races. Ethnically, the population was 4.2% Hispanic or Latino of any race.

=== 2010 census ===
As of the census of 2010, there were 2,952 people, 1,278 households, and 733 families living in the city. The population density was 833.9 inhabitants per square mile (322.0/km^{2}). There were 1,462 housing units at an average density of 413.0 per square mile (159.5/km^{2}). The racial makeup of the city was 96.6% White, 0.3% African American, 0.3% Native American, 0.4% Asian, 1.1% from other races, and 1.1% from two or more races. Hispanic or Latino of any race were 1.8% of the population

There were 1,278 households, of which 25.3% had children under the age of 18 living with them, 45.9% were married couples living together, 7.7% had a female householder with no husband present, 3.8% had a male householder with no wife present, and 42.6% were non-families. 36.5% of all households were made up of individuals, and 16.6% had someone living alone who was 65 years of age or older. The average household size was 2.24 and the average family size was 2.81.

The median age in the city was 45.8 years. 19.8% of residents were under the age of 18; 6.7% were between the ages of 18 and 24; 22.4% were from 25 to 44; 28.5% were from 45 to 64; and 22.6% were 65 years of age or older. The gender makeup of the city was 50.4% male and 49.6% female.

=== 2000 census ===
As of the census of 2000, there were 2,806 people, 1,149 households, and 736 families living in the city. The population density was 807.7 people per square mile (312.2/km^{2}). There were 1,237 housing units at an average density of 356.1 per square mile (137.6/km^{2}). The racial makeup of the city was 98.25% White, 0.36% African American, 0.39% Native American, 0.21% Asian, 0.14% from other races, and 0.64% from two or more races. Hispanic or Latino of any race were 0.57% of the population.

There were 1,149 households, out of which 29.5% had children under the age of 18 living with them, 53.1% were married couples living together, 7.7% had a female householder with no husband present, and 35.9% were non-families. 32.6% of all households were made up of individuals, and 17.6% had someone living alone who was 65 years of age or older. The average household size was 2.34 and the average family size was 2.97.

In the city, the population was spread out, with 23.3% under the age of 18, 7.7% from 18 to 24, 25.5% from 25 to 44, 21.7% from 45 to 64, and 21.8% who were 65 years of age or older. The median age was 41 years. For every 100 females, there were 95.8 males. For every 100 females age 18 and over, there were 91.4 males.

The median income for a household in the city was $36,420, and the median income for a family was $45,643. Males had a median income of $32,292 versus $20,544 for females. The per capita income for the city was $17,384. About 11.2% of families and 10.5% of the population were below the poverty line, including 8.0% of those under age 18 and 18.0% of those age 65 or over.

== Economy ==
- The Kewaunee Nuclear Generating Station is in Carlton in Kewaunee County. The Kewaunee Power Station was decommissioned on May 7, 2013.

Kewaunee Fabrications is the successor to the Kewaunee Shipbuilding and Engineering, a shipbuilder operating from 1941 to 1945.

== Healthcare ==
Kewaunee is home to two primary care clinics and one urgent care center. The area is in both a mental health and primary care Health Professional Shortage Area (HPSA) qualifying the area as a medical desert. There are 7 primary care providers per 100,000 population in Kewaunee compared to the statewide average of 75.6. By 2035, the area is expected to have a 93.7% deficit in physicians, the largest deficit in Wisconsin. There are no behavior health professionals in Kewaunee.

== Attractions ==
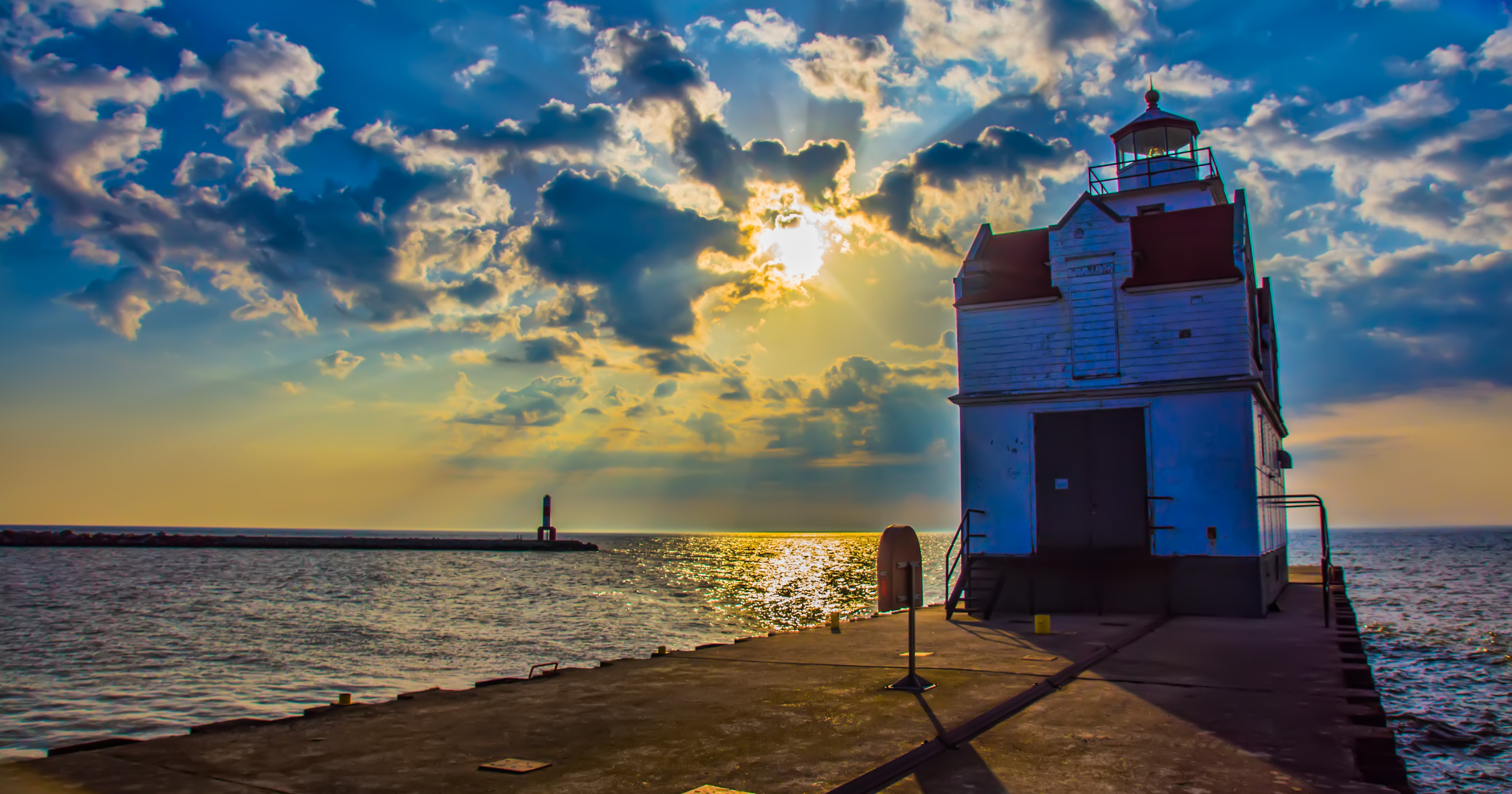
Kewaunee Lighthouse

- Kewaunee Pierhead Lighthouse
- Kewaunee Marshland Walk
- Tallest Grandfather Clock
- Tug Ludington
- Ahnapee State Trail

== Notable people ==
- Brandon Cisse, NFL cornerback for Green Bay Packers
- Jerry Augustine, MLB player, head coach of the University of Wisconsin-Milwaukee Panthers baseball team
- Henry Baetz, Treasurer of Wisconsin
- Colin Cochart, NFL player
- Joseph E. Darbellay, Wisconsin State Representative
- Art Fiala, the last surviving World War I veteran from Wisconsin
- George Grimmer, Wisconsin State Senator
- Terry Jorgensen, MLB player
- John C. Karel, Wisconsin State Representative
- L. Albert Karel, Wisconsin State Representative
- Thomas F. Konop, U.S. Representative
- Stan Kuick, NFL player
- Ransom Asa Moore, professor
- Robert E. Minahan, Mayor of Green Bay, Wisconsin
- Jack Novak, NFL player
- Alvin E. O'Konski, U.S. Representative
- John Milton Read, Wisconsin legislator and newspaper editor
- Dena A. Smith, Wisconsin State Treasurer
- Joseph Stika, U.S. Coast Guard Vice Admiral

== Gallery ==
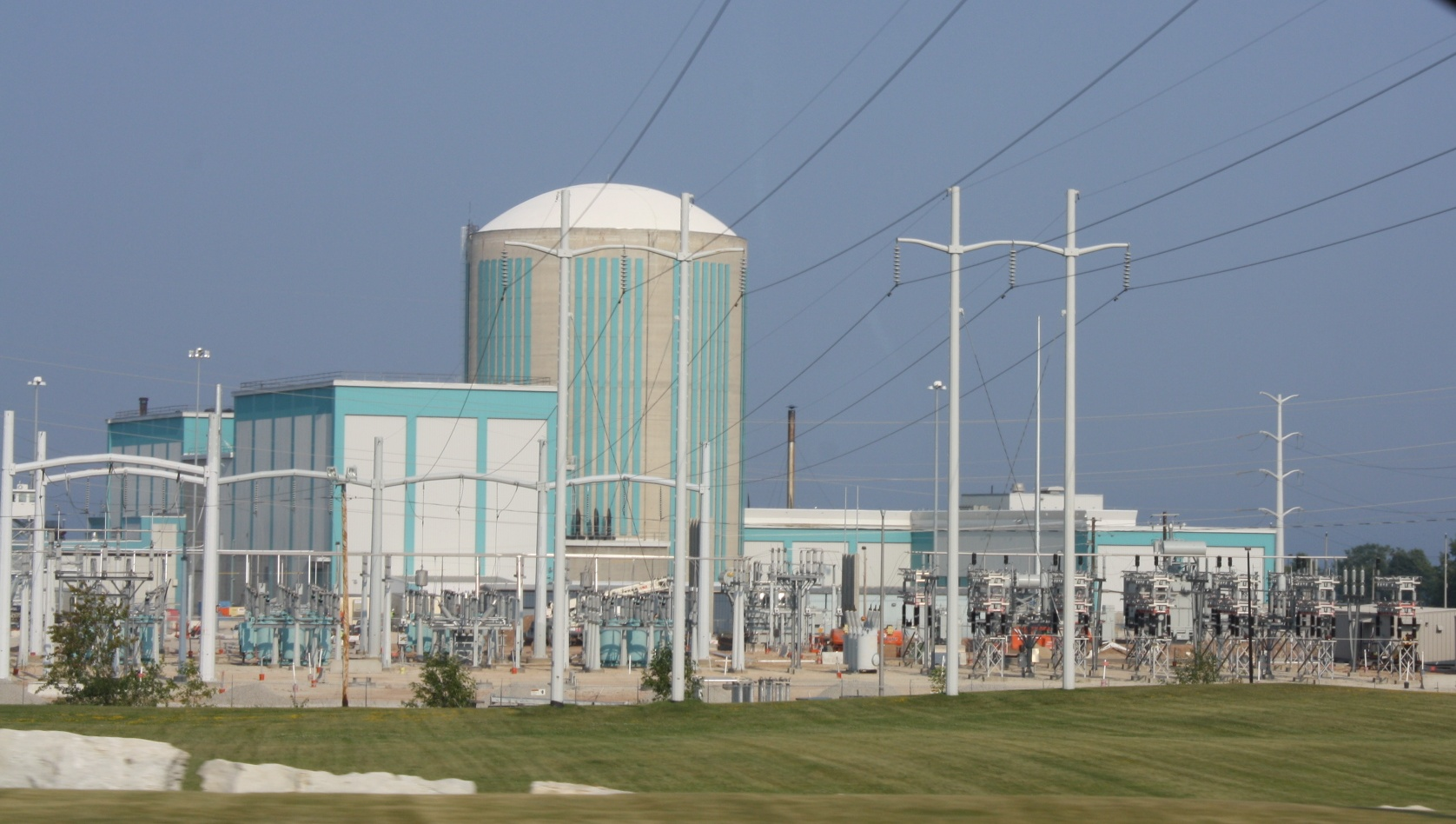
Kewaunee Nuclear Generating Station

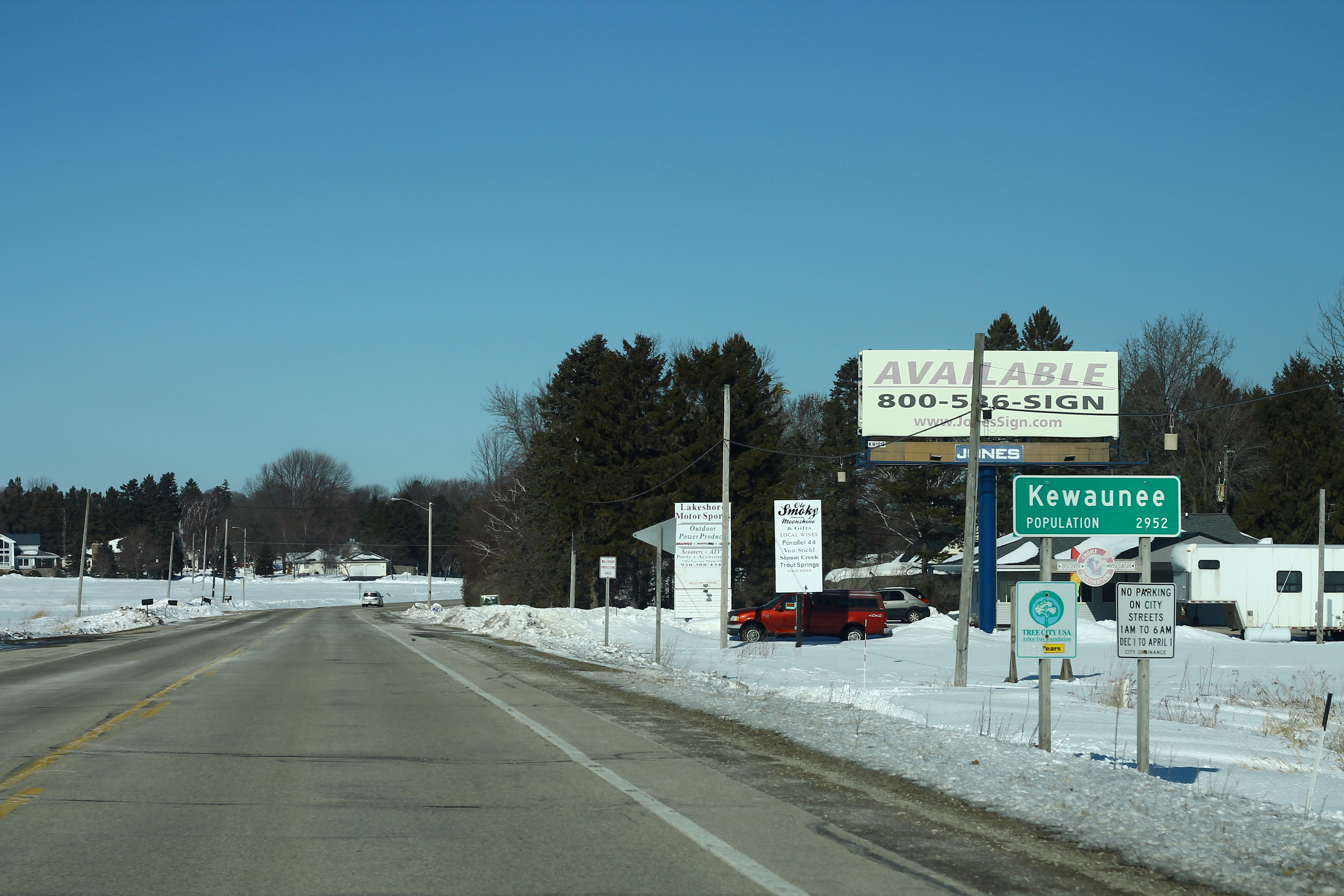
Sign at the city limits at the south of the city along Highway 42

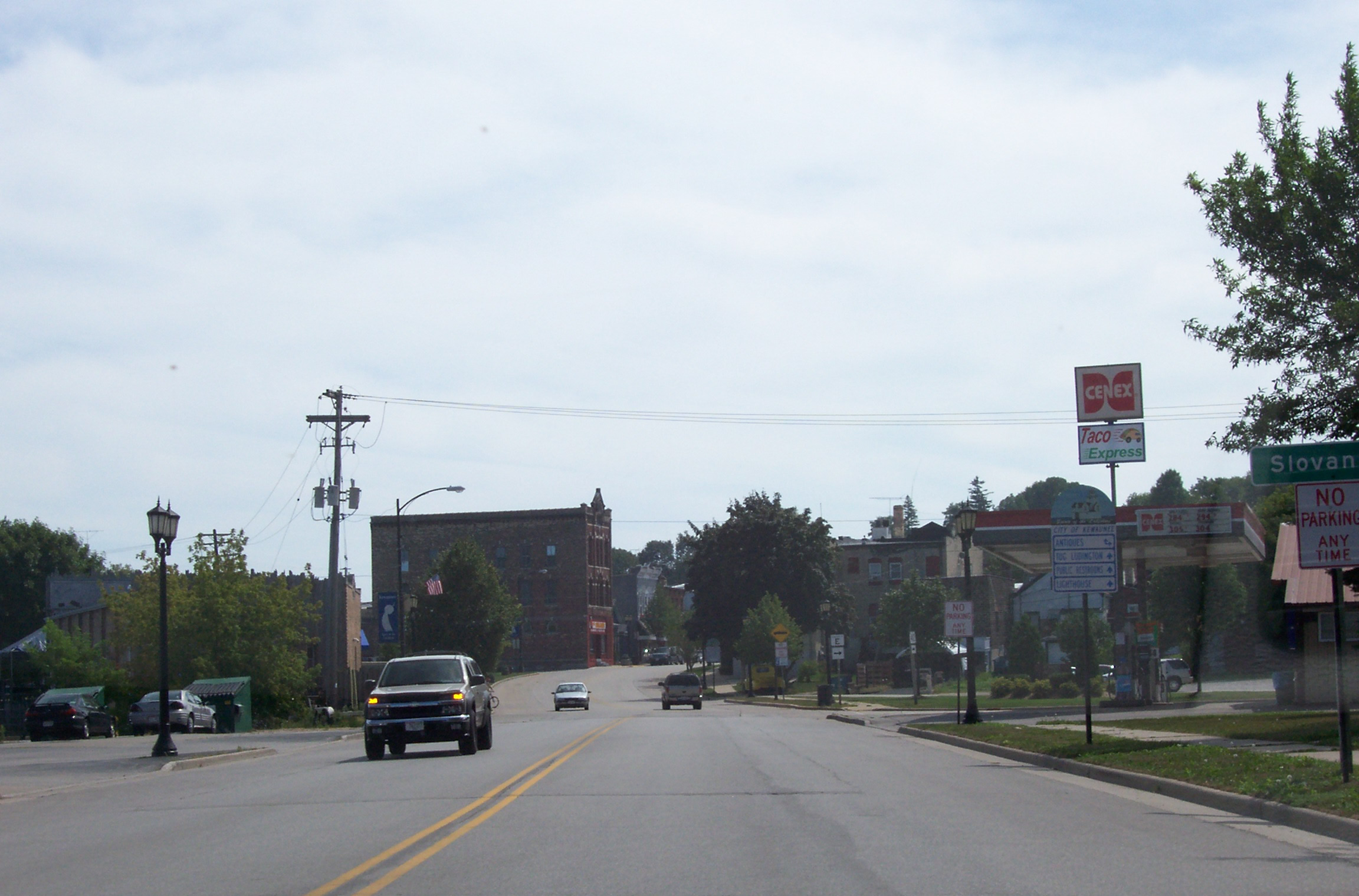
Traveling south on Highway 42

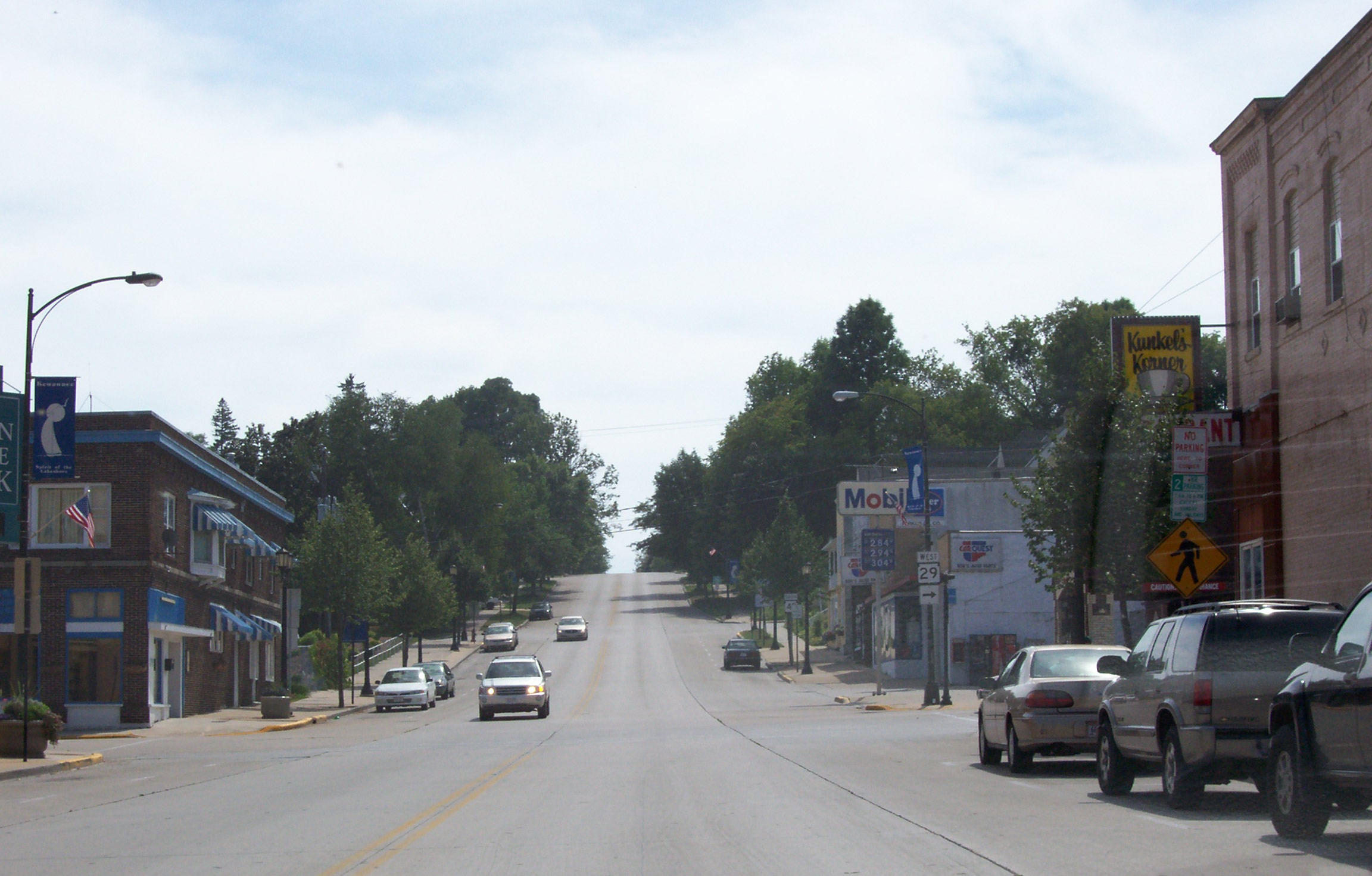
East terminus of Highway 29 in downtown Kewaunee

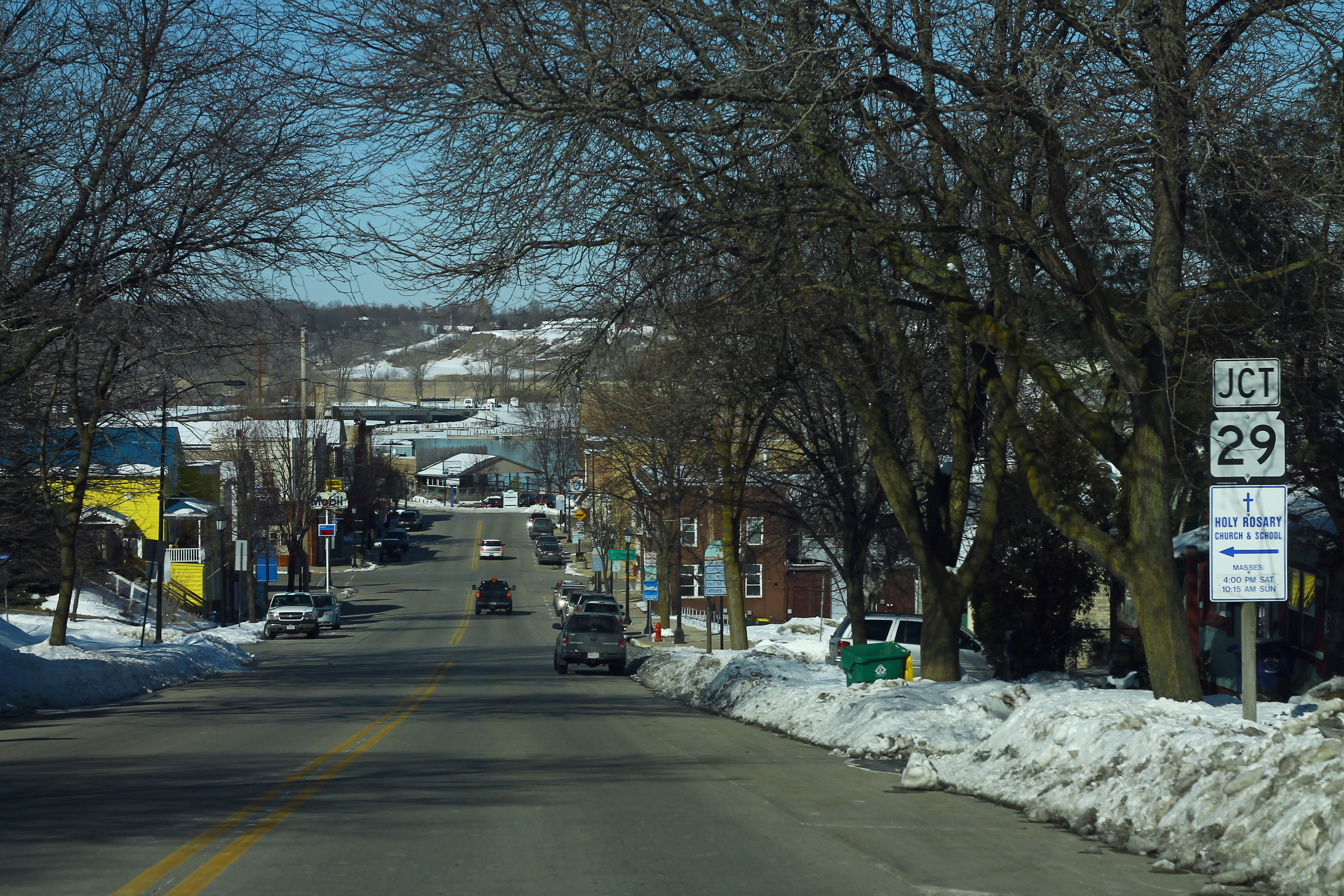
Sign for the east terminus of Wisconsin Highway 29, looking the other way on Highway 42

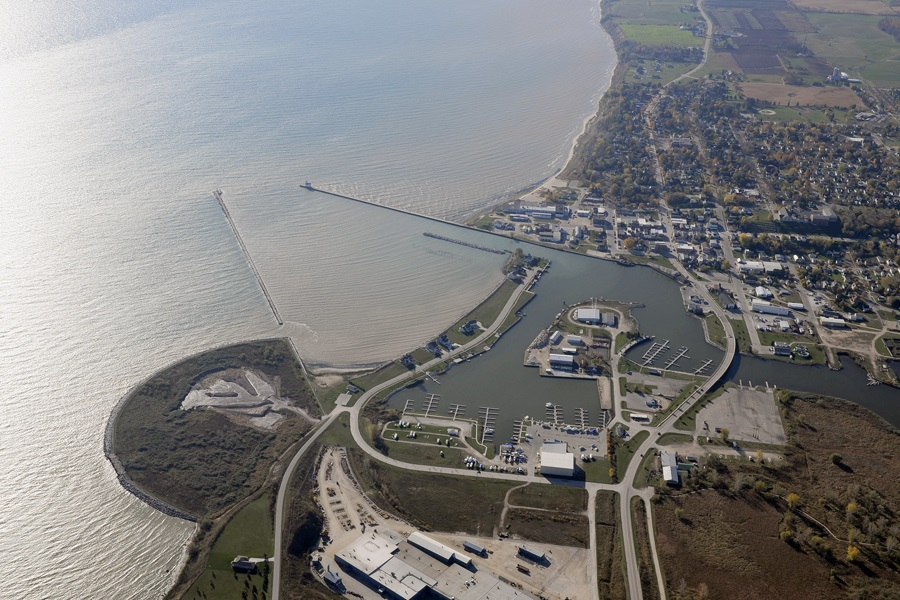
Kewaunee Harbor and mouth of the Kewaunee River

Aerial view

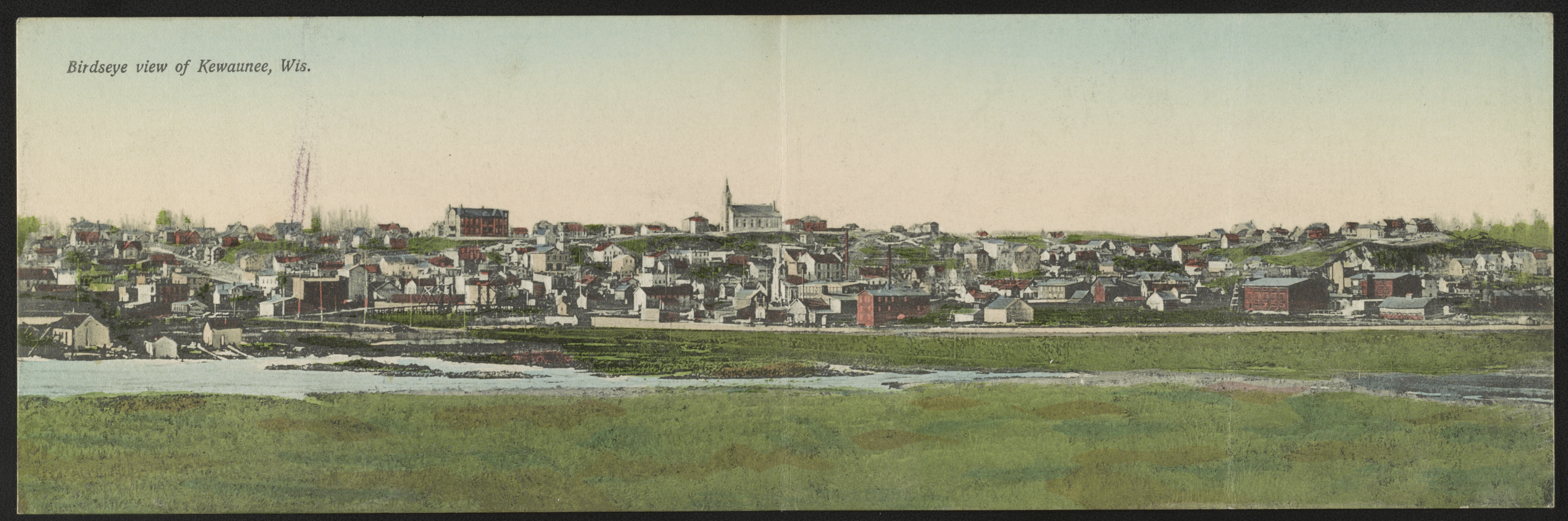
Birdseye view of Kewuanee, from a postcard circa 1909
