= Joseph E. Darbellay =

American politician

Joseph E. Darbellay (August 1, 1845 – February 18, 1900) was a Swiss-born American merchant and politician.

Darbellay was born in Liddes, in the Canton of Valais, Switzerland and went to the public schools. He emigrated with his parents to the United States in 1854 and then settled in Manitowoc County, Wisconsin in 1845. In 1860, Darbellay moved to Kewaunee, Wisconsin. Darbellay was a merchant in Kewaunee, Wisconsin. He served as the town clerk in 1868 and 1869 and as clerk of the Wisconsin Circuit Court for Kewaunee County, Wisconsin from 1870 to 1874, Darbellay served on the Kewaunee County Board of Supervisors from 1873 to 1883. Darballey served in the Wisconsin State Assembly in 1880, 1881, and from 1885 to 1887. Darballey was a Democrat. Darbelley moved to Milwaukee, Wisconsin and worked as a postal inspector. He also worked a traveling collector for a firm in Chicago, Illinois. Darbellay died in Barron, Wisconsin from Bright's disease and had been ill for a week.
