= Luxemburg, Wisconsin =

- Village
- Location of Luxemburg in Kewaunee County, Wisconsin.
- Coordinates: 44°32′45″N 87°41′39″W
- Country: United States
- State: Wisconsin
- County: Kewaunee

Area
  - Total: 2.30 sq mi (5.95 km^{2})
  - Land: 2.30 sq mi (5.95 km^{2})
  - Water: 0 sq mi (0.00 km^{2})
- Elevation: 791 ft (241 m)

Population (2020)
  - Total: 2,685
  - Density: 1,170/sq mi (451/km^{2})
- Time zone: UTC-6 (Central (CST))
  - Summer (DST): UTC-5 (CDT)
- Area code: 920
- FIPS code: 55-46425
- GNIS feature ID: 1568827
- Website: www.luxemburgusa.com

Luxemburg is a village in Kewaunee County, Wisconsin, United States. The population was 2,685 at the 2020 census. It is part of the Green Bay Metropolitan Statistical Area. The village is surrounded by the Town of Luxemburg.

== Geography ==
Luxemburg is located at 44°32′18″N 87°42′17″W (44.538378, -87.704962).

According to the United States Census Bureau, the village has a total area of 2.27 square miles (5.88 km^{2}), all land.

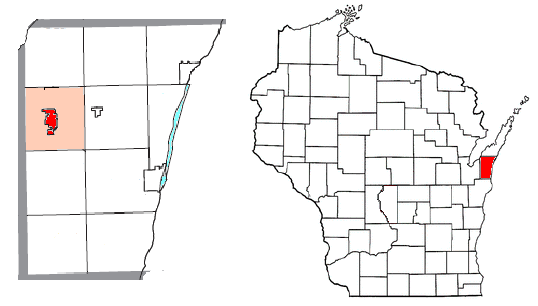

Due to a clerical error, Luxemburg experienced a name swap with Belgium, Wisconsin. Both communities retained their accidental name.

== Climate ==
Luxemburg

Climate chart (precipitation, max. and min. temperature)
J	F	M	A	M	J	J	A	S	O	N	D
62 −6 −12	62 −6 −11	66 2 −8	141 14 −1	105 18 5	106 22 12	108 25 14	88 24 16	72 21 11	121 12 5	68 4 −2	61 −6 −10
- █ Average max. and min. temperatures in °C
- █ Precipitation totals in mm
Imperial conversion
J	F	M	A	M	J	J	A	S	O	N	D
2.4 21 10	2.4 21 12	2.6 36 18	5.6 57 30	4.1 64 41	4.2 72 54	4.3 77 57	3.5 75 61	2.8 70 52	4.8 54 41	2.7 39 28	2.4 21 14
- █ Average max. and min. temperatures in °F
- █ Precipitation totals in inches

== Demographics ==
Historical population
Census	Pop.	Note	%±
1910	402		—
1920	457		13.7%
1930	475		3.9%
1940	468		−1.5%
1950	519		10.9%
1960	730		40.7%
1970	853		16.8%
1980	1,040		21.9%
1990	1,151		10.7%
2000	1,935		68.1%
2010	2,515		30.0%
2020	2,685		6.8%
U.S. Decennial Census

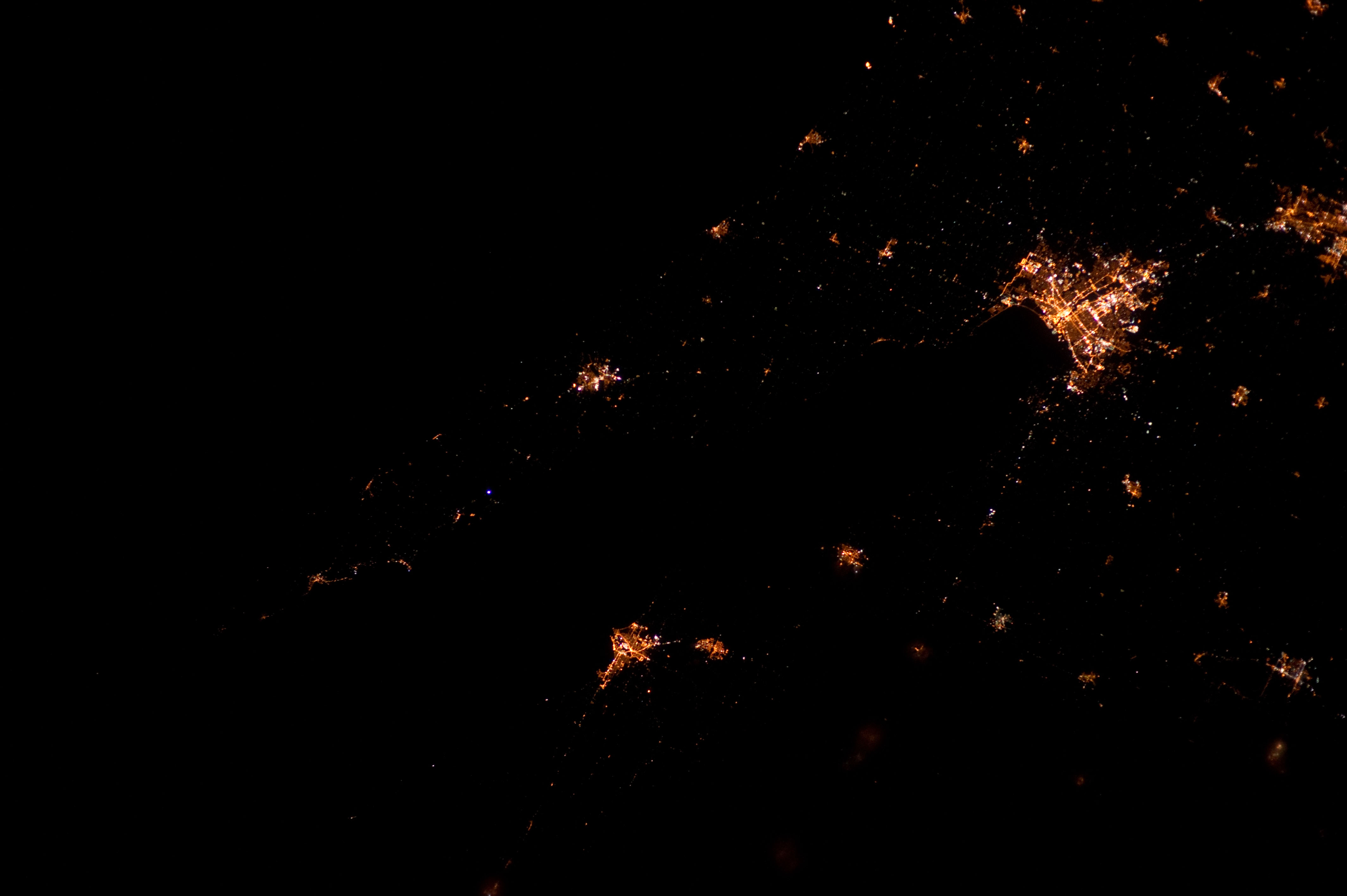
Luxemburg, 1:10 AM CDT

Luxemburg village, Wisconsin – Racial composition
Race (NH = Non-Hispanic)	2020	2010	2000	1990	1980
White alone (NH)	90.3% (2,424)	96.1% (2,417)	98.6% (1,907)	100% (1,151)	99.8% (1,038)
Black alone (NH)	0.2% (5)	0.2% (4)	0.1% (2)	0% (0)	0% (0)
American Indian alone (NH)	0.3% (8)	0.6% (16)	0.1% (2)	0% (0)	0% (0)
Asian alone (NH)	0.3% (7)	0.1% (2)	0.3% (5)	0% (0)	
Pacific Islander alone (NH)	0% (0)	0% (0)	0% (0)		
Other race alone (NH)	0.2% (5)	0% (0)	0.1% (2)	0% (0)	
Multiracial (NH)	2.8% (75)	0.5% (13)	0.4% (8)	—	—
Hispanic/Latino (any race)	6% (161)	2.5% (63)	0.5% (9)	0% (0)	0.2% (2)

The most reported ancestries in 2020 were:

- German (37.4%)
- Belgian (24.5%)
- Irish (9.5%)
- Polish (8.6%)
- English (8.2%)
- Czech (6.9%)
- Mexican (3.3%)
- French (3.2%)
- Dutch (3.1%)
- Norwegian (3%)

=== 2010 census ===
As of the census of 2010, there were 2,515 people, 973 households, and 672 families living in the village. The population density was 1,107.9 inhabitants per square mile (427.8/km^{2}). There were 1,008 housing units at an average density of 444.1 per square mile (171.5/km^{2}). The racial makeup of the village was 97.2% White, 0.2% African American, 0.7% Native American, 0.1% Asian, 0.9% from other races, and 0.9% from two or more races. Hispanic or Latino of any race were 2.5% of the population.

There were 973 households, of which 41.1% had children under the age of 18 living with them, 54.1% were married couples living together, 10.6% had a female householder with no husband present, 4.4% had a male householder with no wife present, and 30.9% were non-families. 26.2% of all households were made up of individuals, and 12.9% had someone living alone who was 65 years of age or older. The average household size was 2.57 and the average family size was 3.13.

The median age in the village was 34.7 years. 29.9% of residents were under the age of 18; 6.9% were between the ages of 18 and 24; 29.1% were from 25 to 44; 21% were from 45 to 64; and 13.1% were 65 years of age or older. The gender makeup of the village was 49.0% male and 51.0% female.

=== 2000 census ===
As of the census of 2000, there were 1,935 people, 719 households, and 524 families living in the village. The population density was 935.7 people per square mile (360.9/km^{2}). There were 754 housing units at an average density of 364.6 per square mile (140.6/km^{2}). The racial makeup of the village was 98.86% White, 0.10% Black or African American, 0.10% Native American, 0.26% Asian, 0.26% from other races, and 0.41% from two or more races. 0.47% of the population were Hispanic or Latino of any race.

There were 719 households, out of which 39.5% had children under the age of 18 living with them, 59.5% were married couples living together, 9.9% had a female householder with no husband present, and 27.1% were non-families. 22.7% of all households were made up of individuals, and 10.4% had someone living alone who was 65 years of age or older. The average household size was 2.63 and the average family size was 3.11.

In the village, the population was spread out, with 28.2% under the age of 18, 8.7% from 18 to 24, 32.8% from 25 to 44, 16.4% from 45 to 64, and 13.9% who were 65 years of age or older. The median age was 32 years. For every 100 females, there were 98.7 males. For every 100 females age 18 and over, there were 89.4 males.

The median income for a household in the village was $45,000, and the median income for a family was $50,795. Males had a median income of $32,813 versus $23,897 for females. The per capita income for the village was $17,856. About 2.6% of families and 5.6% of the population were below the poverty line, including 4.8% of those under age 18 and 17.2% of those age 65 or over.

== Notable people ==
- Joseph Filz, Wisconsin State Representative and postmaster of Luxemburg
- Bernard Hahn, Wisconsin State Representative
- Terry Jorgensen, former Major League Baseball player
- Benji LaCrosse, 2006 IMCA Modified national racing champion
- Joseph M. Mleziva, Wisconsin State Representative
- Steve Okoniewski, former National Football League player
- Lary J. Swoboda, Wisconsin State Representative

== Gallery ==
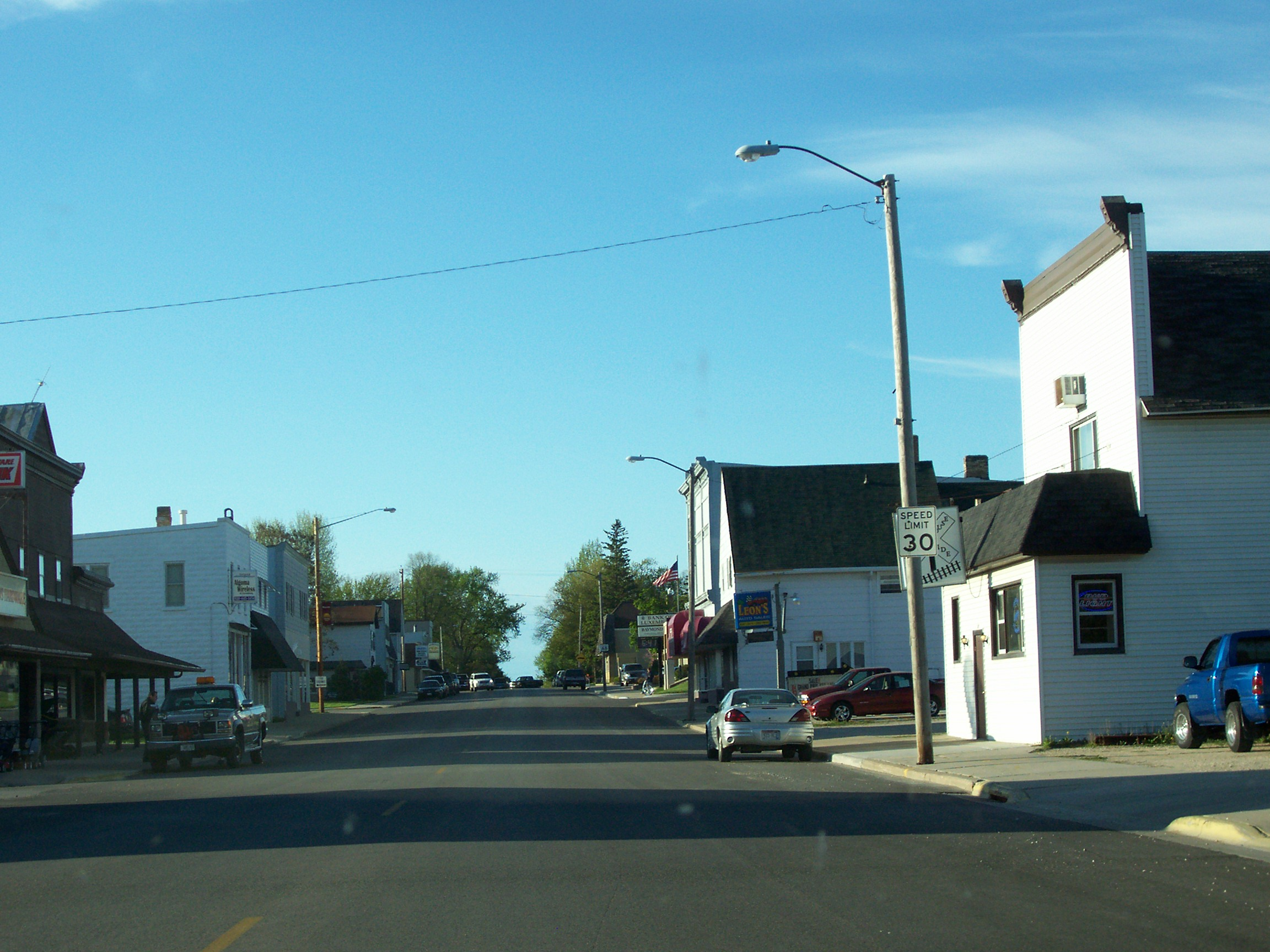
Looking north at downtown Luxemburg

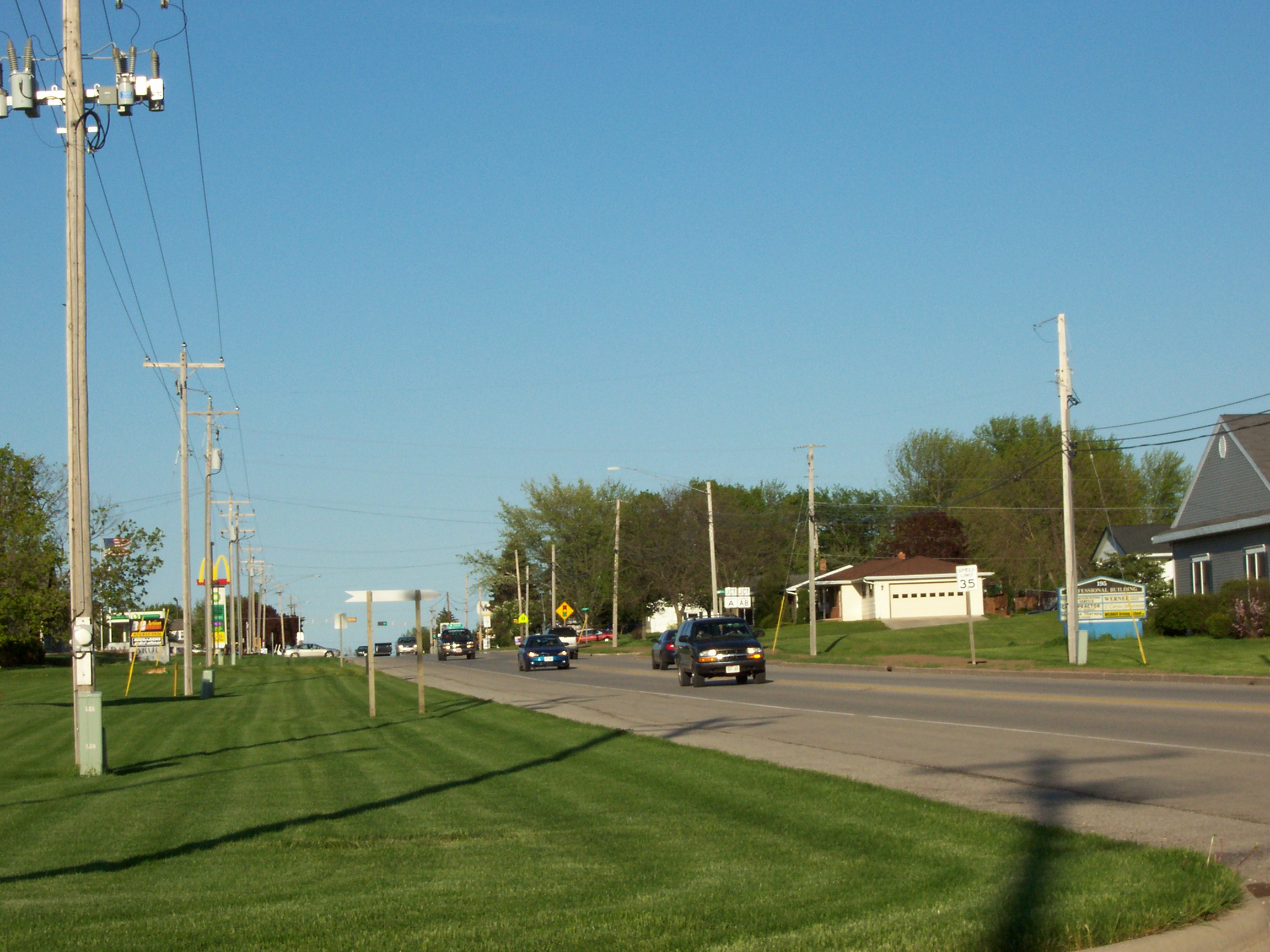
Looking east at Luxemburg

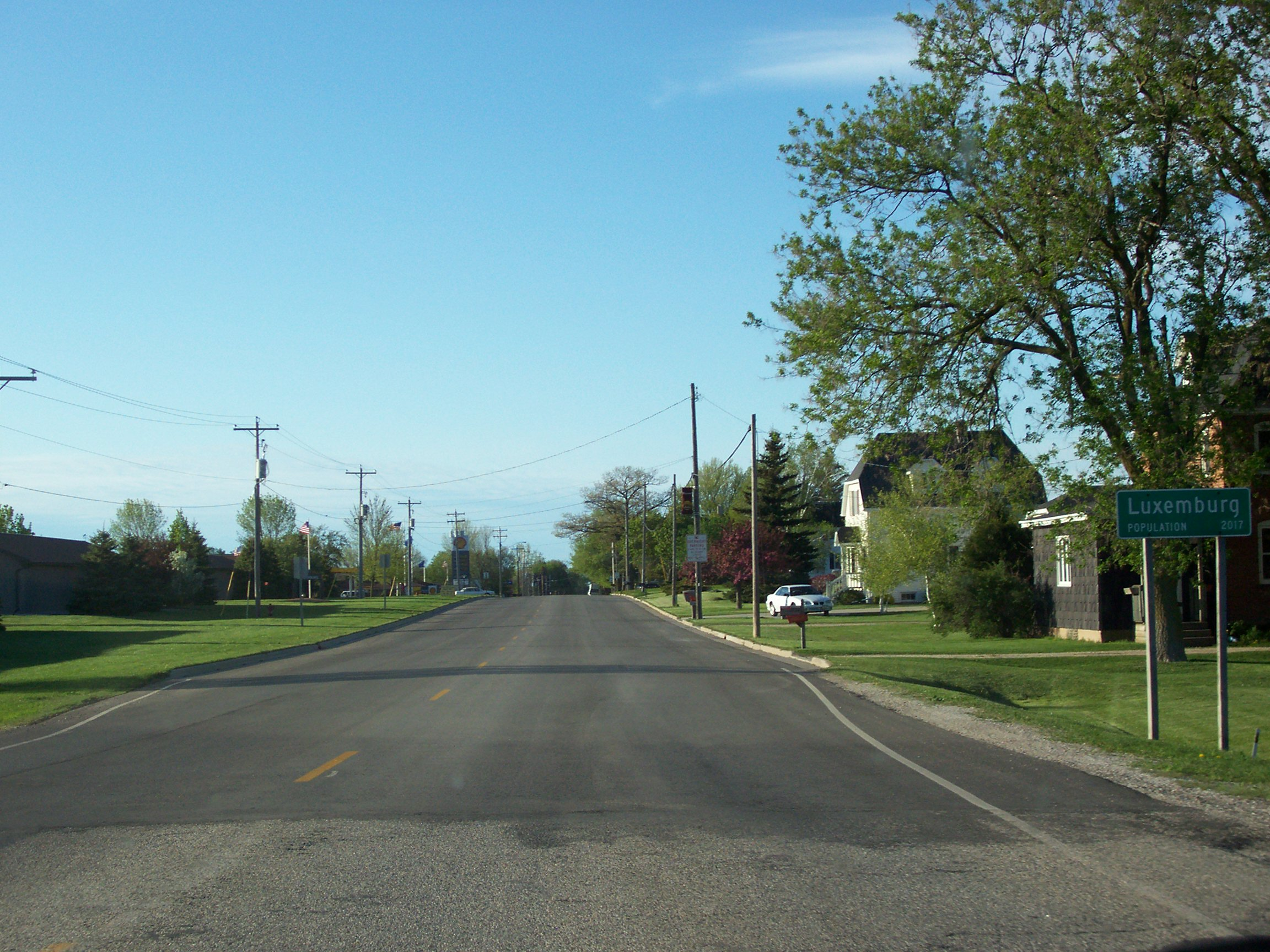
Road sign

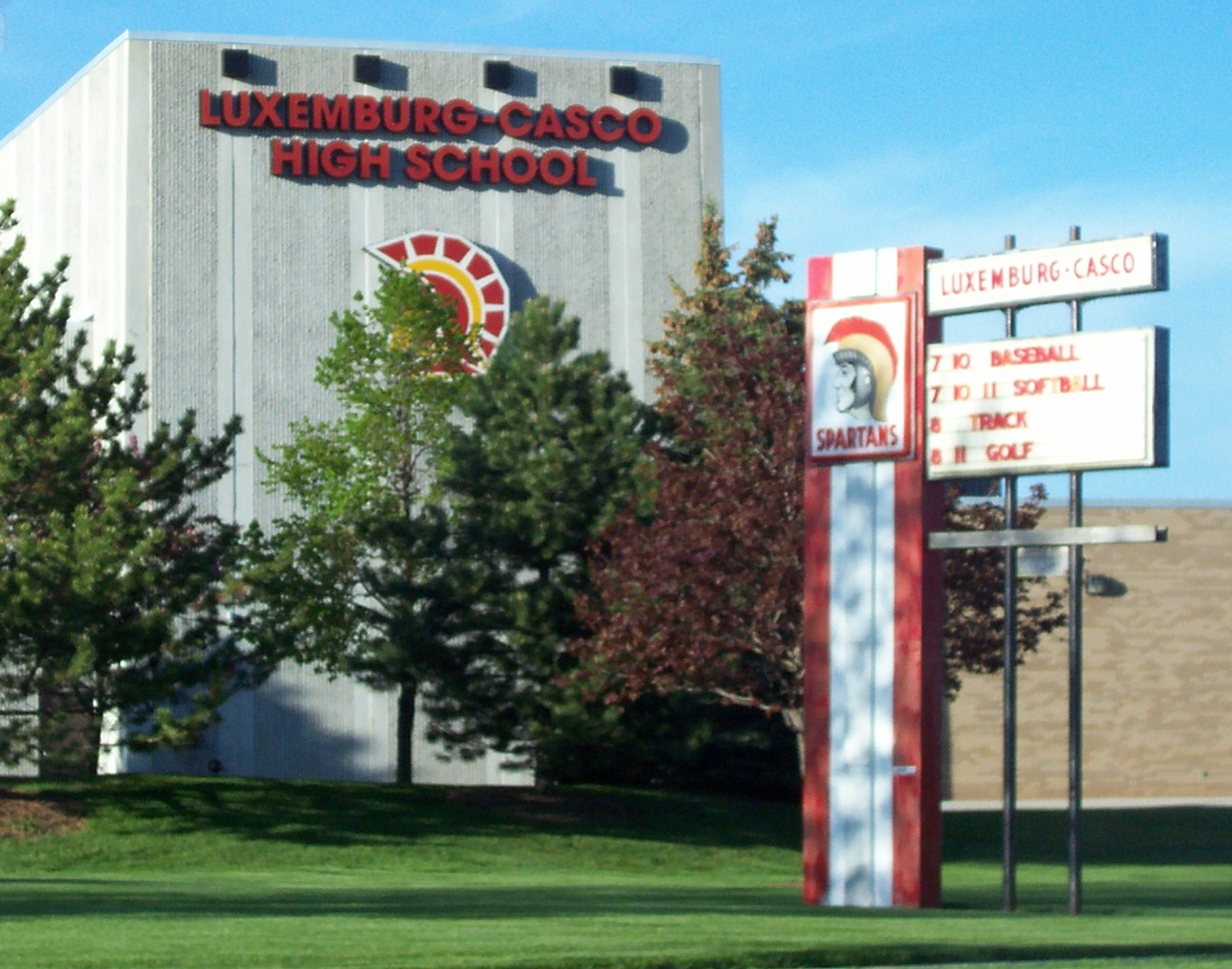
Luxemburg-Casco High School

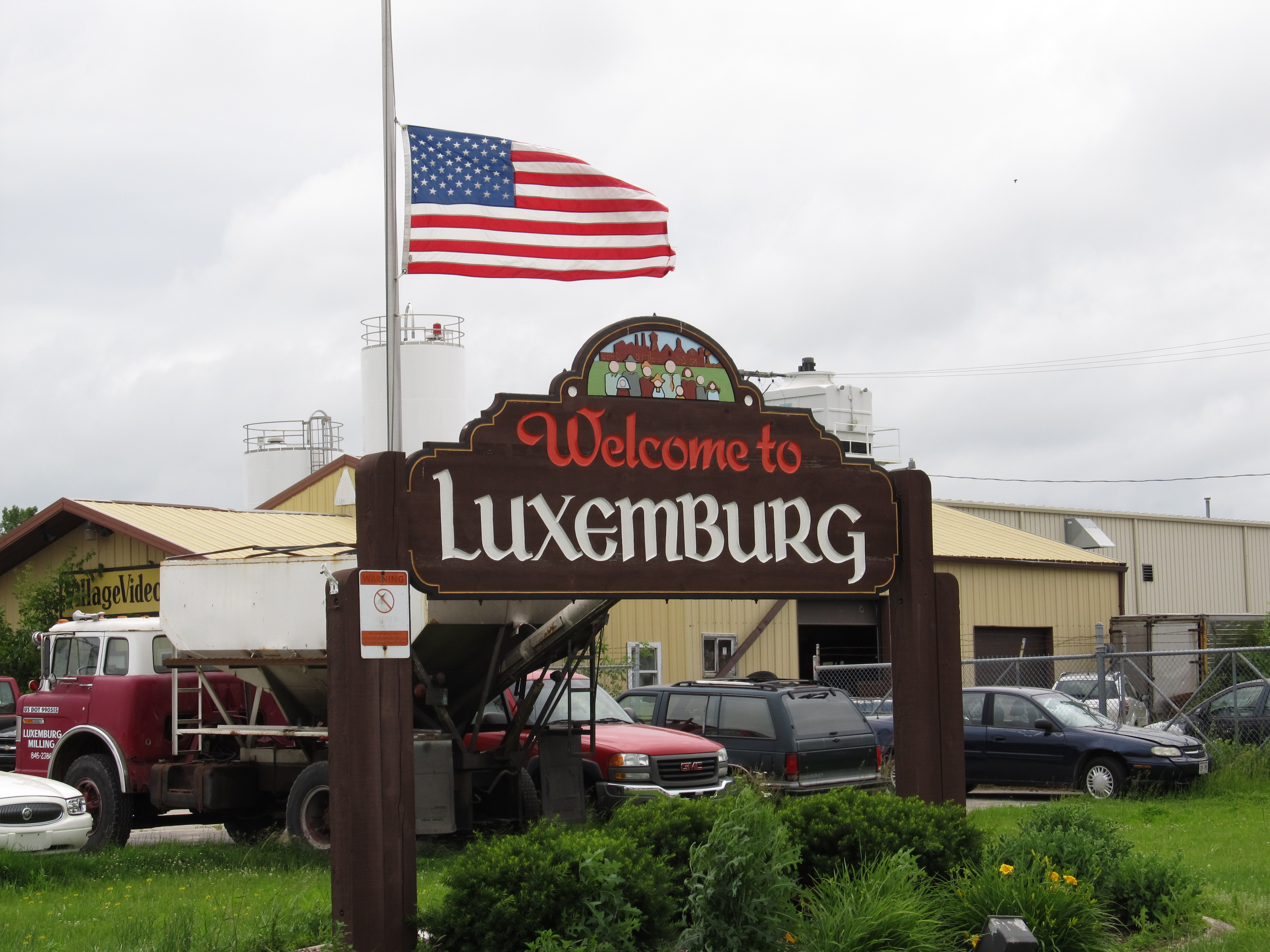
Welcome sign

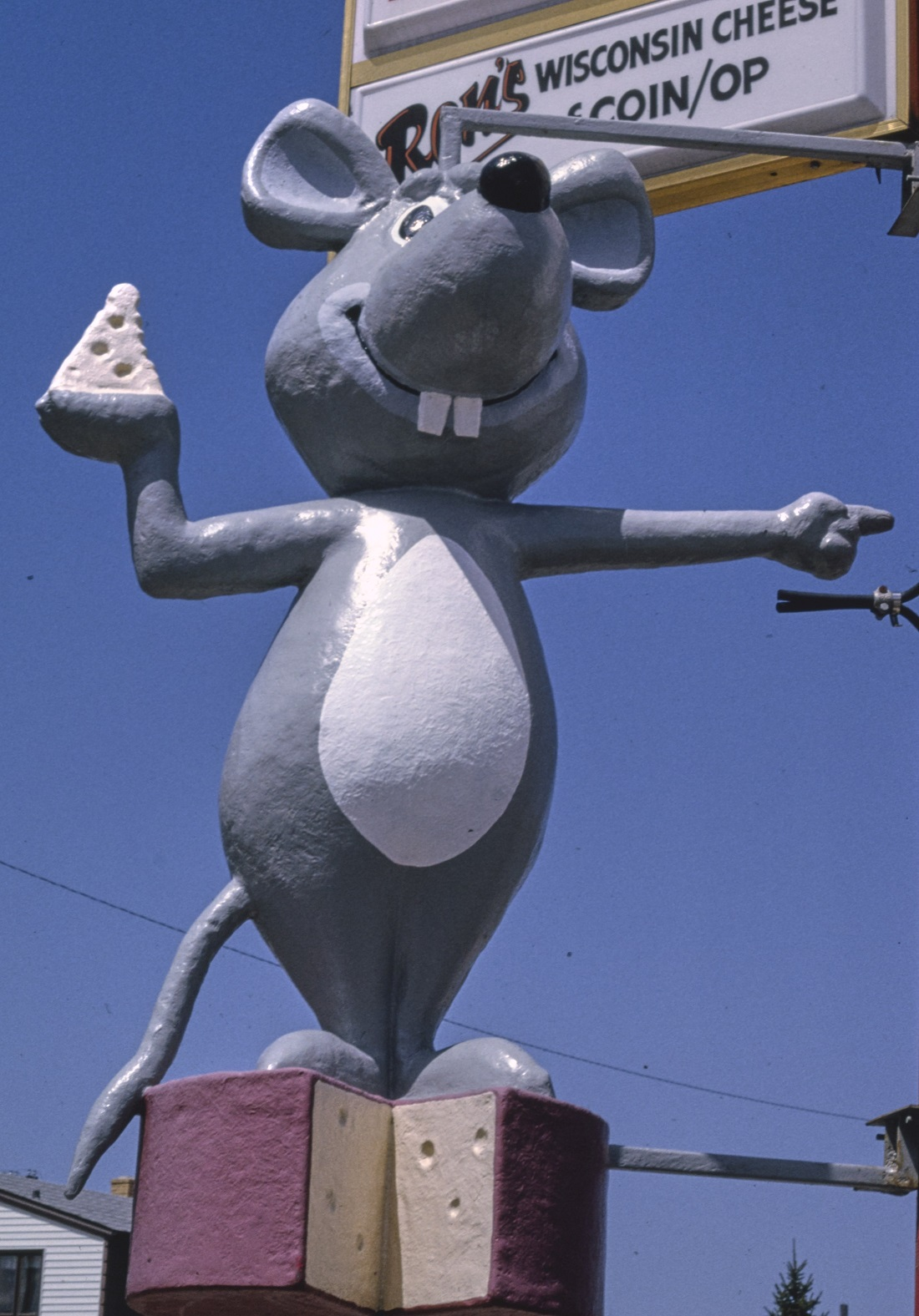
Ron's Cheese sign
