= National Register of Historic Places listings in Kewaunee County, Wisconsin =

Location of Kewaunee County in Wisconsin

This is a list of the National Register of Historic Places listings in Kewaunee County, Wisconsin. It is intended to provide a comprehensive listing of entries in the National Register of Historic Places that are located in Kewaunee County, Wisconsin. The locations of National Register properties for which the latitude and longitude coordinates are included below may be seen in a map.

There are 17 properties and districts listed on the National Register in the county. Another property was once listed but has been removed.

This National Park Service list is complete through NPS recent listings posted May 29, 2026.

== Current listings ==
	Name on the Register	Image	Date listed	Location	City or town	Description
1	AMERICA Shipwreck (Canaller)	AMERICA Shipwreck (Canaller)	July 3, 2013 (#13000467)	Four miles offshore in Lake Michigan; 44°21′01″N 87°24′56″W	Lake Michigan	137-foot three-masted canaller (schooner built specifically to squeeze through the Welland Canal), built in 1873. She hauled grain and lumber east as far as New York state, and brought back coal. Sank in 1880 after hitting a scow full of stones.
2	Ahnapee Brewery	Ahnapee Brewery	June 17, 1994 (#94000597)	115 Navarino St. 44°36′35″N 87°26′07″W	Algoma	Built in 1868, the building served as a brewery until 1890, then a warehouse, fly net factory, washing machine factory, feed storage, and now the Von Stiehl Winery.
3	DANIEL LYONS (Shipwreck)	DANIEL LYONS (Shipwreck)	October 3, 2007 (#07001048)	E of Stoney Cr. outlet, 4 mi (6.4 km). offshore 44°40′21″N 87°17′43″W	Lake Michigan	Three-masted schooner built in 1873. Sank in 1878 after being hit by another schooner, on a run from Chicago to New York.
4	Art Dettman Fishing Shanty	Art Dettman Fishing Shanty	December 10, 1993 (#93001428)	Church St. at the Ahnapee R. 44°36′35″N 87°26′02″W	Algoma	Rambling building on the harbor built in 1935 to house a fishing business.
4	John Evenson Shipwreck (Tugboat)		May 18, 2026 (#100013018)	In Lake Michigan 3.61 miles (5.81 km) northeast of the Algoma Pierhead Light; 44°38′17″N 87°22′16″W	Ahnapee	54-foot wood-hulled steam-driven tugboat built in 1884 in Milwaukee by John Evenson. It worked for years as an independent tug, competing with the Milwaukee Tug Boat Company. In June 1895 while trying to help the I. Watson Stephenson enter the Sturgeon Bay Ship Canal, the tug was hit by the larger steamer and quickly sank. The Stephenson lowered boats and rescued most of the tug's crew, but the ship fireman was trapped below deck and drowned.
5	George Halada Farmstead	George Halada Farmstead	February 11, 1993 (#93000026)	E-1113 Co. Trunk Hwy. F, Montpelier Township; 44°27′25″N 87°42′51″W	Ellisville	Largely intact farmstead from the 1870s. The oldest part of the Italianate house was built around 1878. Some of the log farm buildings are older.
6	Kewaunee County Sheriff's Residence and Jail	Kewaunee County Sheriff's Residence and Jail	July 5, 1996 (#96000728)	Court House Sq., jct. of Dodge and Vliet Sts. 44°27′23″N 87°30′18″W	Kewaunee	1876 Italianate building designed by William Waters. Now the museum of the Kewaunee County Historical Society.
7	Kewaunee Pierhead Lighthouse	Kewaunee Pierhead Lighthouse	August 15, 2022 (#100007998)	In L. Michigan at east end of south pier at Kewaunee R. mouth, 0.5 mi east of WI 42; 44°27′27″N 87°29′34″W	Kewaunee	Built in 1931 to mark the south pier, an octagonal lantern room on a square tower, housing a fifth-order Fresnel lens.
8	Kewaunee Post Office	Kewaunee Post Office	October 24, 2000 (#00001247)	119 Ellis St. 44°27′30″N 87°30′03″W	Kewaunee	Contains a mural "Winter Sports" painted by Paul Faulkner in 1940, funded as part of the New Deal.
9	MAJOR WILBUR FR. BROWDER (tugboat)	MAJOR WILBUR FR. BROWDER (tugboat)	March 28, 2002 (#02000284)	Harbor Park, Kilbourn St. 44°27′36″N 87°30′06″W	Kewaunee	Tugboat built in 1943 which towed ammunition barges across the English Channel in the Battle of Normandy. Later used by Army Corps of Engineers in the Great Lakes. Now a museum.
10	Margaret A. MUIR Shipwreck (Schooner)	Margaret A. MUIR Shipwreck (Schooner)	June 23, 2025 (#100011949)	Address Restricted	Algoma vicinity	129-foot wood-hulled 3-masted schooner built by Hanson and Scove's shipyard in Manitowoc for David Muir of Chicago. Hauled wheat, coal and iron ore around the Great Lakes until September of 1893, when she sank in a storm, carrying a load of barrel salt. Only the ship's dog was lost.
11	Marquette Historic District	Marquette Historic District	November 4, 1993 (#93001167)	Roughly bounded by Lake Michigan and Center, Juneau and Lincoln Sts. 44°27′11″N 87°30′13″W	Kewaunee	43 homes in various architectural styles popular from the 1880s to 1930s.
12	Melvin W. and Mary Perry House	Melvin W. and Mary Perry House	January 23, 2008 (#07001461)	519 3rd St. 44°36′29″N 87°26′15″W	Algoma	Perry started the Ahnapee Veneer and Seating Company in 1892, and helped lead Algoma Net and Algoma Foundry. He was also a civic leader (including State Senator) and philanthropist. His 1909 house is a mix of Classical Revival and Shingle styles.
13	Pilgrim Family Farmstead	Pilgrim Family Farmstead	May 8, 1979 (#79000091)	SW of Kewanee on Church Rd. 44°25′14″N 87°38′01″W	Kewaunee	Brick farmhouse and wooden windmill mounted on barn. Built 1907.
14	St. Lawrence Catholic Church	St. Lawrence Catholic Church	February 21, 1989 (#89000056)	Jct. of WI 163 and County Hwy. J 44°23′58″N 87°41′05″W	Stangelville	Victorian Gothic church with 150 foot steeple, built by Bohemian immigrants from 1892 to 1894. The preceding church building stood where workers were amazingly spared from a falling tree.
15	Sandy Bay Pier		May 21, 2026 (#100013020)	Address Restricted	Carlton	Site of pier where the Sandy Bay sawmill and commercial complex were accessed and resupplied from the 1850s to 1880s.
15	TRINIDAD Shipwreck (Schooner)	TRINIDAD Shipwreck (Schooner)	July 3, 2024 (#100010476)	Address Restricted	Algoma	138-foot wood-hulled 2-masted canal schooner, built in 1867 by William Keefe at Grand Island, New York. For most of her early years, she carried iron and coal to Chicago and Milwaukee, and grain back to Oswego. In May of 1881, hauling a load of coal from Oswego to Milwaukee, the neglected ship began taking on water and sank off Algoma. The crew escaped in a yawl, but the mascot dog went down with the ship.

== Former listings ==
	Name on the Register	Image	Date listed	Date removed	Location	City or town	Description
1	Massart Farmstead	Massart Farmstead	November 19, 1980 (#80000143)	December 30, 1984	N of Casco on SR C	Casco	Relocated to Heritage Hill State Historical Park in Green Bay in 1984.

== See also ==
- List of National Historic Landmarks in Wisconsin
- National Register of Historic Places listings in Wisconsin
- Listings in neighboring counties: Brown, Door, Manitowoc
