= Jakobson Shipyard =

Coordinates: 40°52′35″N 73°32′21″W

Jakobson Shipyard, Inc.
- Type: Private
- Industry: Transportation
- Founded: 1926
- Founder: Daniel Jakobson
- Fate: Ceased Operations
- Headquarters: Brooklyn, New York (1926-1938), Oyster Bay, New York (1938-1984), United States
- Products: tug, yacht, fireboat
- Services: vessel repair, upgrades, yacht and small boat repowering, full service boat marina facility

The Jakobson Shipyard, Inc. was a shipyard involved in manufacture of tugs, ferries, submarines, minesweepers, yachts, fireboats and other craft, based in Brooklyn, New York, from 1926 to 1938, and Oyster Bay, New York, from 1938 to 1984.

== History ==
Note: Ship names utilized are the Original Names with text in italics. The numbers in parentheses following the Original Name is the Hull Number.

The Jakobson Shipyard, Inc. traces its origins to founder Daniel Jakobson, who established the Jakobson & Peterson shipyard in Brooklyn, New York, in 1895. Jakobson was a native of Sweden who immigrated to the United States in 1877. His son, Irving Jakobson, succeeded him as President in 1925. The elder Jakobson died November 28, 1931, at his residence on 370 Senator Street in Brooklyn.

The firm operated in Brooklyn until around 1938 when it was decided to move to Oyster Bay, New York. As many as 700 people worked at Jakobson's during the height of production around World War II.

Four diesel-electric tugboats were built and launched for the Lehigh Valley Railroad from 1948 and 1950. These include the Wilkes-Barre (327), Hazelton (328), Cornell (329), and Lehigh (330). Of these, the tugboat Cornell is the last in service. These diesel tugs were meant to replace steam driven tugs used by the railroad in New York Harbor for towing car floats and barges. Among the benefits that came from diesel were eliminating time lost for fueling.

Jakobson's produced and launched three fireboats for the City of Baltimore in 1960. These were the Mayor J. Harold Grady (397), P.W. Wilkinson (398), and August Emrich (399).

The State of New York provided $5 million to buy the shipyard in 1997, from funds in the state's 1972 Environmental Quality Bond Act. The money had been previously designated for a waste incinerator on Long Island that had never been built. Gov. George E. Pataki speaking at that time said, "This cooperative purchase will recapture an important part of Oyster Bay's waterfront and the area's unique maritime character."

Officers and key staff around the time Jakobson's stopped operation were Mr. George J. Hossfeld, President; Mr. John Hossfeld, Shipyard Manager; Mr. William R. Gordon, Vice President; and Ms. Robin Ritter, Office Manager. The publication Worldwide ship and boat repair facilities published around the time of closing described the firm as follows:

Operates vessel repair, upgrades, yacht and small boat repowering and full service boat marina facility. With 2 marine railways to 235’ and 1,500 LT, 2,000 feet of total berthing, buildingways, and shops.

== Register of Ships Produced ==
Data in these tables is from Tim Colton's Shipbuilding History web site.

=== Built in Brooklyn (by Jakobson & Petersen) ===
	Original Name	Original Owner	Type	Tons	Delivery	Description
	Meitowax	Long Island Rail Road	Tug		1926	Sunk 1963
	J. Norman Riley	Riley & Kendall	Tanker		February 29, 1928	Designed to carry 100,000 gallons of petroleum, 128 feet long, two 180-horsepower Fairbanks-Morse engines.
	(Unknown)	United States Public Health Service	Launch (1 of 2)		ca. 1931	Design by P.W. Clark, Naval Architect. 41 foot launch powered by a Fairbanks-Morse 4-Cylinder 45-Horsepower Full Diesel Motor.
	(Unknown)	United States Public Health Service	Launch (2 of 2)		ca. 1931	Design by P.W. Clark, Naval Architect. 41 foot launch powered by a Fairbanks-Morse 4-Cylinder 45-Horsepower Full Diesel Motor.
	Alsumar	Dave Hennen Morris Jr.	Yawl		June 21, 1934	Design by Sparkman & Stephens, 72 feet overall.
	Kinawan	Robert Baruch	Cutter Yacht	25	May 23, 1936	Active. Design by Cox & Stevens, 53 feet overall.
259	Dauntless No. 11	Dauntless Towing Co.	Tug	146	1936	Later Martha Moran 1955, now Dauntless
	Wakiva	Harkness Edwards	Yawl		June 9, 1938	Design by Sparkman & Stephen, 72 feet on deck, diesel powered engines.
276	Dauntless No. 12	Dauntless Towing Co.	Tug	140	1938	Later Dauntless No. 2, Helen B Moran, West Point, Easton, Will Colonna. Withdrawn 1992
	Petrel (yacht)		Yacht	31	1938	Active

=== Built in Oyster Bay (by Jakobson Shipyard) ===
	Original Name	Original Owner	Type	Tons	Delivery	Description
274	Otco	Oil Transport Co.	Tug	142	1938	Later Eugenia Moran, Vegco, Norwich and Seagull, sank 1998
	Bluejacket		Yacht	56	1940	Now Westerly.
282	Dauntless No. 14	Dauntless Towing Co	Tug	249	1940	Later Yaquima (YT 171) 1941, Dauntless No. 14 1946, M. Moran 1955, Lambert Point 1960, Claire Moran 1970. Withdrawn 1990.
	Lt Col Paul W. Evans	US Army	Tug		1941	Later Yaquima (YT 171) 1941, Dauntless No. 14 1946, M. Moran 1955, Lambert Point 1960, Claire Moran 1970. Withdrawn 1990.
285	Gotham	Electric Ferry Co.	Ferry	569	March 1941	To US Navy 1942 as Asquith (YFB 42), later Gotham 1946, Delaware 1965, scrapped 1979.
287	Dauntless No. 15	Dauntless Towing Co.	Tug	192	September 1941	Later US Army Col Albert H. Barkley, then Andrew Foss, Pachena, now yacht Lumberman.
288	Anna L. Connors	Standard Towing Corp.	Tug	106	1942	Later Theresa M. Coyne, now Mid-State I.
289	Excel (AM 94)	US Navy	Minesweeper	1250	December 10, 1942	Later PC 1598, sold 1947
290	Exploit (AM 95)	US Navy	Minesweeper	1250	February 5, 1943	Later PC 1599, sold 1949, reold 1991 as Exploit
291	ATR 15	US Navy	Rescue Tug	850	1943	Lost off Normandy 1944
292	ATR 16	US Navy	Rescue Tug	850	1943	Disposed of 1948
293	Fred A. Cassidy	Jersey City Stockyards	Tug	101	1942	Later Elizabeth
294	Maj Ethel A. Robbins	US Army	Tug (LT 1)	249	April 1943	Sold Hong Kong 1946 as Silverside, then HKT Silverside, Silver Side (existence in doubt 2001)
295	Maj Randolph J. Hermandez (Maj Randolf J. Hernandez?)	US Army	Tug (LT 2)	249	June 1943	Later Dauntless No 15, then Julia C Moran, Sparrows Point, Accomac, Doris Moran, now Sparta
296	Maj Ralph Bogle	US Army	Tug (LT 3)	249	August 1943	Later Pacific Titan, then fishing Pacific Trader. Foundered 1980.
297	Maj Wilbur F. Browder	US Army	Tug (LT 4)	249	October 1943	To USACE as Ludington. 1998 museum at Kewaunee.
298	Maj Elisha K. Henson	US Army	Tug (LT 5)	249	November 1943	To USACE as John F. Nash. 1991 H. Lee White Marine Museum at Oswego, NY.
299	Maj Ocea L. Ferris	US Army	Tug (LT 6)	249	December 1943	Later Capt Eric J Newman, then Falcon, Pat B, Mary St Philip. Reefed 1993.
300	Maj George W. Hovey	US Army	Tug (LT 7)	249	February 1944	Later San Luis II, then Terence J Smith.
301	Maj Charles A. Radcliffe	US Army	Tug (LT 8)	249	March 1944	Later Kathleen C Tracy, then Sea Lion. Sank 1964 .
302	Oiltransco	Oil Transfer Corp	Tug	175	August 1943	Later Doris Moran, now Harbor Star (2008 for sale, no engine)
	ATR 66	US Navy	Rescue Tug	850	1945	Sold Norway 1946 as Storebror, then Lenaship II
	ATR 67	US Navy	Rescue Tug	850	August 1945	Later Dorothy Ann Meseck, scrapped 1954.
307	LT 643	US Army	Tug	394	September 1944	Later Taurus, then Gaelic Challenge, Frankie D, Dawson B, Doug McKeil, now Western Tugger.
308	LT 644	US Army	Tug	394	November 1944	To UNRRA China 1946.
309	LT 645	US Army	Tug	394	February 1945	To UNRRA 1946.
310	LT 646	US Army	Tug	394	March 1945	To US Navy 1946 as ATA 243. Stricken 1962.
311	Turecamo Boys	Turecamo Towing	Tug	113	1945	Later Blue Star. Existence in doubt 1991.
314	The Narrows (ferry)	Electric Ferry Co.	Ferry	545	September 1946	Ferry closed 1950.
315	The Tides (ferry)	Electric Ferry Co.	Ferry	545	September 1946	Ferry closed 1950. Restaurant 1971.
	(Unknown)		Sloop yacht		ca. 1946	
	Kongaree		Yawl yacht		ca. 1947	
	Kewamee	Zechariah Olsen ?	Yacht	47	1947	Now Antares.
	Nimrod IV		Sloop yacht		ca. 1948	
327	Wilkes-Barre	Lehigh Valley Railroad	Tug	239	1948	Later Julia C. Moran. Existence in doubt 2001.
328	Hazleton	Lehigh Valley Railroad	Tug	239	1950	Later Marie Moran, then Marie Casho, Captain Bill. Reefed 2004 as Veronica M.
329	Cornell	Lehigh Valley Railroad	Tug	196	1949	Active.
330	Lehigh	Lehigh Valley Railroad	Tug	236	1950	Later Swan Point. Reefed 2002 as J B Eskridge.
	Laughing Gull (yacht)		Yawl yacht		1949	Later Swan Point. Reefed 2002 as J B Eskridge.
	Paterson	Erie Railroad	Tug		1949	Later Steven McAllister. Reefed 2000 as HRFA.
336	Eugene F. Moran	Moran Towing	Tug	219	1951	Scrapped 2002.
337	Julia C. Moran	Moran Towing	Tug	270	1951	Now Puerto Ordaz.
	Neptune	R.J. Casho	Tug	83	1951	Later Bali Sea, now Charleston.
339	Capmoore	Lehigh Valley Railroad	Tug	236	1952	Later Hawkins Point. Dismantled 2002.
340	Marie J. Turecamo	Turecamo Towing	Tug	144	1952	Later Marie J, now William E.
	Hornell	Erie Lackawanna RR	Tug	222	1952	Now Virginia.
	Marion	Erie Lackawanna RR	Tug	192	1953	Later Marion Smith 1978, Brooklyn III 1979, New York 1979, Pleon 1989.
	(Unknown)		Tug		1953	
344	Brooklyn III	Brooklyn Eastern District Terminal	Tug	262	1953	Scrapped 1996.
345	Cross Harbor I	Brooklyn Eastern District Terminal	Tug	262	1953	Later New Jersey. Sunk 2007.
346	Bethlehem		Tug	241	1953	Later Shannon Smith, now Christopher B. Turecamo.
347	Kpo	Denco Shipping Lines (Lib)	Cargo	366	1954	Sunk in hostilities 1990.
	X-1	US Navy	Midget Submarine		October 1955	Built by Fairchild Engine and Airplane Corporation, struck 1973, now museum at Groton CT.
	Cherry Point		Tug		1955	
362	Barney Turecamo	Turecamo Towing	Tug	167	1956	Later Ocean Princess, now G. R. Gainer.
365	Lofa	Denco Shipping Lines (Lib)	Cargo	344	1956	Sunk in hostilities 1990.
367	Diana L. Moran	Moran Towing	Tug	239	1956	Scrapped 2006.
368	Cynthia Moran	Moran Towing	Tug	239	January 1957	Now Cynthia Nicole.
372	W R Coe	Virginian Railway Co	Tug	259	1957	Later R B Claytor, Karen Tibbetts, now Ethel Tibbetts.
	Oil Transco No. ?	Oil Transco	Tug	146	1957	Later Morania No. 8, now Tortuga.
375	Neill McAllister	McAllister Towing	Tug	167	1957	Active.
376	Frances Turecamo	Turecamo Towing	Tug	146	1957	Active. (at North River Tugboat Museum; yacht?)
377	Hustler II	Oil Transfer Corp	Tug	141	1958	Later Margot Moran, Jolene Rose, now Margot.
	Irving T. Bush	New York Dock Railroad	Tug	252	1958	Now Texas.
383	Russell 10		Tug	146	1958	Later Judith McAllister, then Celtic, sank 1984.
384	Nancy Moran	Moran Towing	Tug	228	1958	Active.
386	Dalzelleagle	Moran Towing	Tug	231	December 1958	Now McAllister Bros.
387	Flo W	Mar-K Towing ?	Tug	194	1959	Later Karl E Martersteck, now E. L. Jones.
	Cyane	Cyane Partnership	Yacht	15	1959	Active.
	Ondine	Sumner A. Long	Yacht		ca. 1959	Wrecked on Virgin Gorda BVI?
397	Mayor J. Harold Grady	City of Baltimore	Fireboat	93	1960	Sold 2008.
398	P. W. Wilkinson	City of Baltimore	Fireboat	93	1960	Sold 2002, now Caitlin.
399	August Emrich	City of Baltimore	Fireboat	93	1960	Sold 2002 as yacht Eileen Francis, now Nancy B.
	Louise	Const'n. & Marine Eqpmt.	Tug	17	1959	Active.
	Buchanan 3	A. P. Franz	Tug	112	1960	Active.
	Brooklyn	NYD Properties	Tug	251	1960	Now Florida.
	Loon	Gifford Pinchot III	Yacht	15	1961	Active.
406	Esso Maryland	Esso Shipping	Tug	281	January 1962	Later Exxon Maryland, now Maryland.
	Edward T	Costello Marine	Barge	68	1962	Active.
408	Patricia Moran	Moran Towing	Tug	288	September 1962	Active.
409	Kerry Moran	Moran Towing	Tug	289	March 1963	Active.
417	Esther Moran	Moran Towing	Tug	426	1963	Now Salvor.
420	Mascoutah (YTB-772)	US Navy	Tug	356	October 11, 1964	Later (YTM-760). To NDRF 1986. Sold as Eddie Mac I, now Atlantic Aspen.
421	Menasha (YTB-773)	US Navy	Tug	356	January 6, 1965	Later (YTM-761). To NDRF 1986. Sold 1995 as Escorte.
424	Texaco Bahamas	Texaco Marine	Landing Craft	248	June 1965	Later Bahamas Transporter, now Dina I.
	Parranda (yacht)		Yacht-cruise	211	1965	Active.
428	Rude (S 590)	N.O.A.A.	Survey Ship	150	December 15, 1966	Active.
429	Heck (S 591)	N.O.A.A.	Survey Ship	150	March 11, 1967	Deactivated 1995. Sold 2001 as Heck.
430	Eugenia Moran	Moran Towing	Tug	261	January 1967	Active.
431	Grace Moran	Moran Towing	Tug	261	May 1967	Active.
432	Menasha		Tug	120	1967	Now Escorte – same as Yd 421?
433	Texaco Fire Chief	Texaco Marine	Tug	207	September 1967	Now Ruby M.
434	Town Point	Moran Towing	Tug	258	November 1967	Active.
435	Drum Point	Moran Towing	Tug	258	March 1968	Active.
436	Texaco Marfak	Texaco Marine	Tug	180	1968	Later Texaco Plein Palais, Trintoc Plein Palais, now Petrotrin Plein Palais.
437	Texaco Concord	Texaco Marine	Tug	145	1968	Now Petrotrin Concord.
438	Gillen Brothers	Salem Tugboat	Tug	242	February 1969	Later Texaco Marfax II, now High Roller.
445	Dona Cecilia	Terminales Maracaibo	Tug	250	1970	Active.
446	Texaco Houma II	Texaco Marine	Tug	197	August 1970	Now Houma.
447	Creole Ojeda		Tug	120	January 1971	Existence in doubt 2001.
449	J. Bradley O'Hara		Fishing Vessel	199	November 1971	Later Distant Water, now Popado II.
450	Shaddad	Bahrain Petroleum	Tug	298	June 1972	Active.
451	Texaco Diesel Chief	Texaco Marine	Tug	197	February 1973	Later Star Diesel Chief, Morania No 5, May McGuirl, now Lucy Reinauer.
452	Texaco Fuel Chief	Texaco Marine	Tug	296	July 1973	Later Star Fuel Chief, Colonel, now Navigator.
453	Reliance	Providence Steamboat	Tug	231	April 1974	Active.
454	Resolute	Providence Steamboat	Tug	231	January 1975	Active.
456	Cape Cod	Moran Towing	Tug	293	August 1976	Later Joan Moran, now Cape Ann.
457	Sewells Point	Moran Towing	Tug	237	April 1977	Active.
458	Harriet Moran	Moran Towing	Tug	238	February 1978	Active.
459	Limpia Mar	PDV Marina	Pollution Control Vessel	150	July 1978	Active.
461	Rowe		Tug	199	October 1979	Now H. J. Reinauer.
462	Texaco AvJet	Texaco Marine	Tug	284	May 1980	Later Star Avjet, Matthew, Heide E. Roehrig, now Siberian Sea.
464	Provincetown II	Bay State LLC	Passenger	96	1980	Active.
465	Freedom	O'Hara Corp.	Fishing Vessel	196	September 1981	Active.
466	Exxon Maine	Exxon Shipping	Tug	291	May 1982	Later Exxon Carquinez, S/R Carquinez, Justine, now Justine McAllister.
467	Escort	Express Marine	Tug	198	June 1983	Active.
468	H. Butler Flower	Flower & Sons	Fishing Vessel	120	October 1982	Active.
469	Chessie	Chesapeake & Ohio RR	Tug	274	November 1983	Later Brent J McAllister, now G. M. McAllister.
470	Seaboard	Chesapeake & Ohio RR	Tug	274	June 1984	Now Nancy McAllister.
471	Consort	Express Marine	Tug	199	October 1984	Active.

== See also ==
- List of sailboat designers and manufacturers
