= SS X-1 =

United States Navy midget submarine

Coordinates: 41.387616°N 72.087323°W

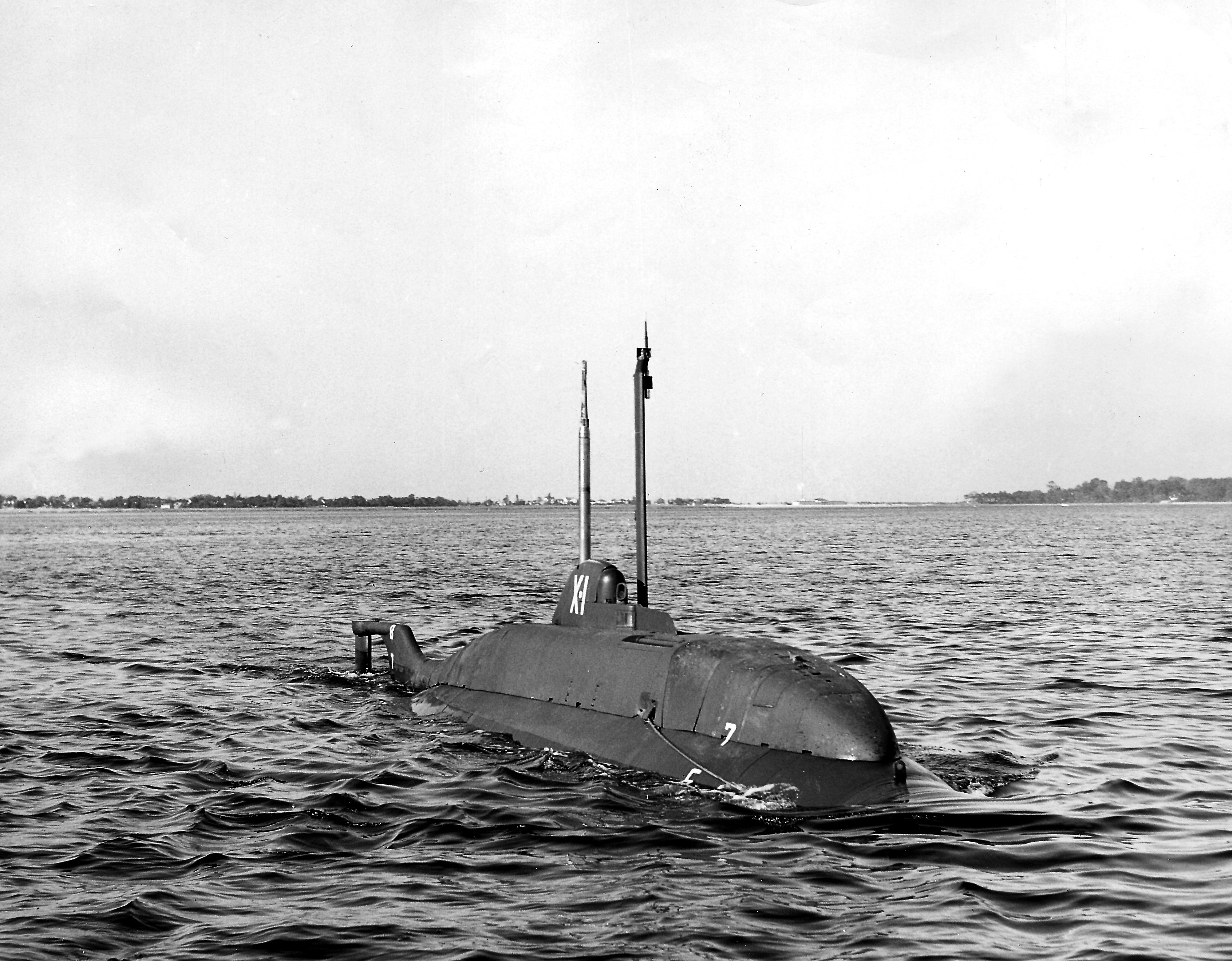
- X-1

History

United States
- Name: USS X-1
- Builder: Fairchild Aircraft, East Farmingdale Long Island, New York
- Laid down: 8 June 1954
- Launched: 7 September 1955
- Commissioned: (never commissioned)
- In service: 7 October 1955
- Out of service: 2 December 1957
- In service: December 1960
- Out of service: 16 February 1973
- Fate: Museum ship

General characteristics
- Type: Midget submarine
- Displacement: 36.3 long tons (37 t) submerged; 31.5 long tons (32 t) surfaced
- Length: 49 ft 6 in (15.09 m)
- Beam: 7 ft (2.1 m)
- Draft: 6 ft 2 in (1.88 m)
- Propulsion: Hydrogen peroxide/diesel engine and battery system; Converted to diesel-electric drive after May 1957
- Complement: 10
- Armament: None

X-1 (or SS X-1) was a United States Navy Midget Submarine designed under project SCB 65. Laid down on 8 June 1954, at Deer Park, Long Island, New York, by the Engine Division of Fairchild Engine and Airplane Corporation. Launched on 7 September 1955, at Oyster Bay, Long Island, by Jakobson Shipyard. Delivered to the Navy on 6 October at New London, Connecticut and placed in service on 7 October 1955 with Lieutenant Kevin Hanlon in command.

== Service history ==
X-1 served in a research capacity in rigorous and extensive tests to assist the Navy to evaluate its ability to defend harbors against very small submarines. Further tests conducted with the X-1 helped to determine the offensive capabilities and limitations of this type of submersible.

X-1 was originally powered by a hydrogen peroxide/diesel engine and battery system, but an explosion of her hydrogen peroxide supply on 20 May 1957 resulted in the craft's modification to accept a diesel-electric drive. On 2 December 1957, X-1 was taken out of service and deactivated at Philadelphia.

Towed to Annapolis, Maryland, in December 1960, X-1 was reactivated and attached to Submarine Squadron 6 and based at the Small Craft Facility of the Severn River Command for experimental duties in Chesapeake Bay. In tests conducted under the auspices of the Naval Research Laboratory, X-1 performed for scientists who observed her operations from a platform suspended beneath the Bay Bridge, to learn more about the properties and actions of sea water.

Having been in active service through January 1973, X-1 was again taken out of service on 16 February 1973. On 26 April 1973, she was transferred to the Naval Ship Research and Development Center, Annapolis. On 9 July 1974, she was slated for use as a historical exhibit. She was later displayed on the grounds of the Naval Station complex, North Severn, near Annapolis. In 2001, X-1 was transferred to the Submarine Force Museum, in Groton, Connecticut, where she is on display before the main exhibit building.

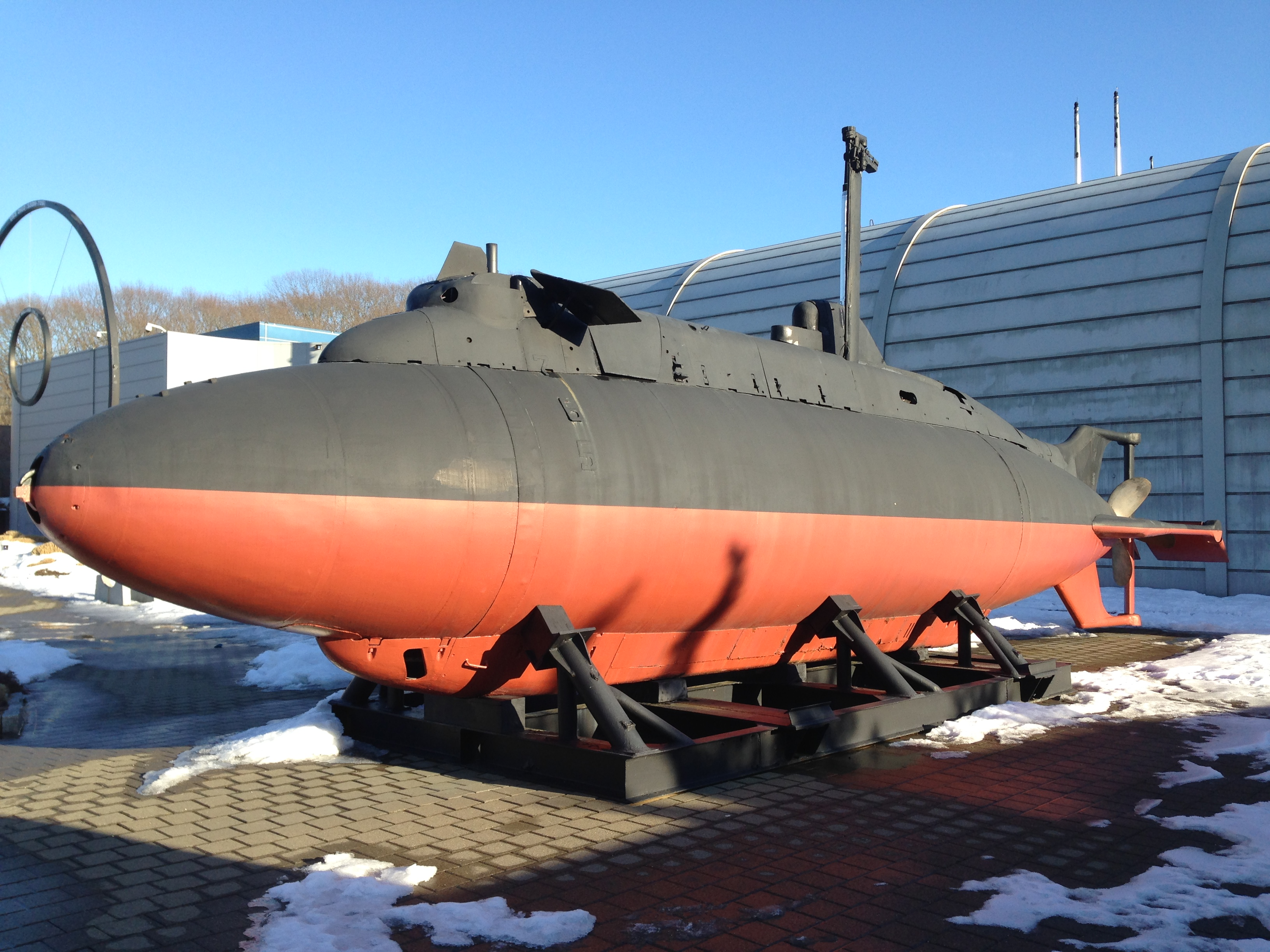
X-1 Midget Submarine on display at the Submarine Force Library and Museum

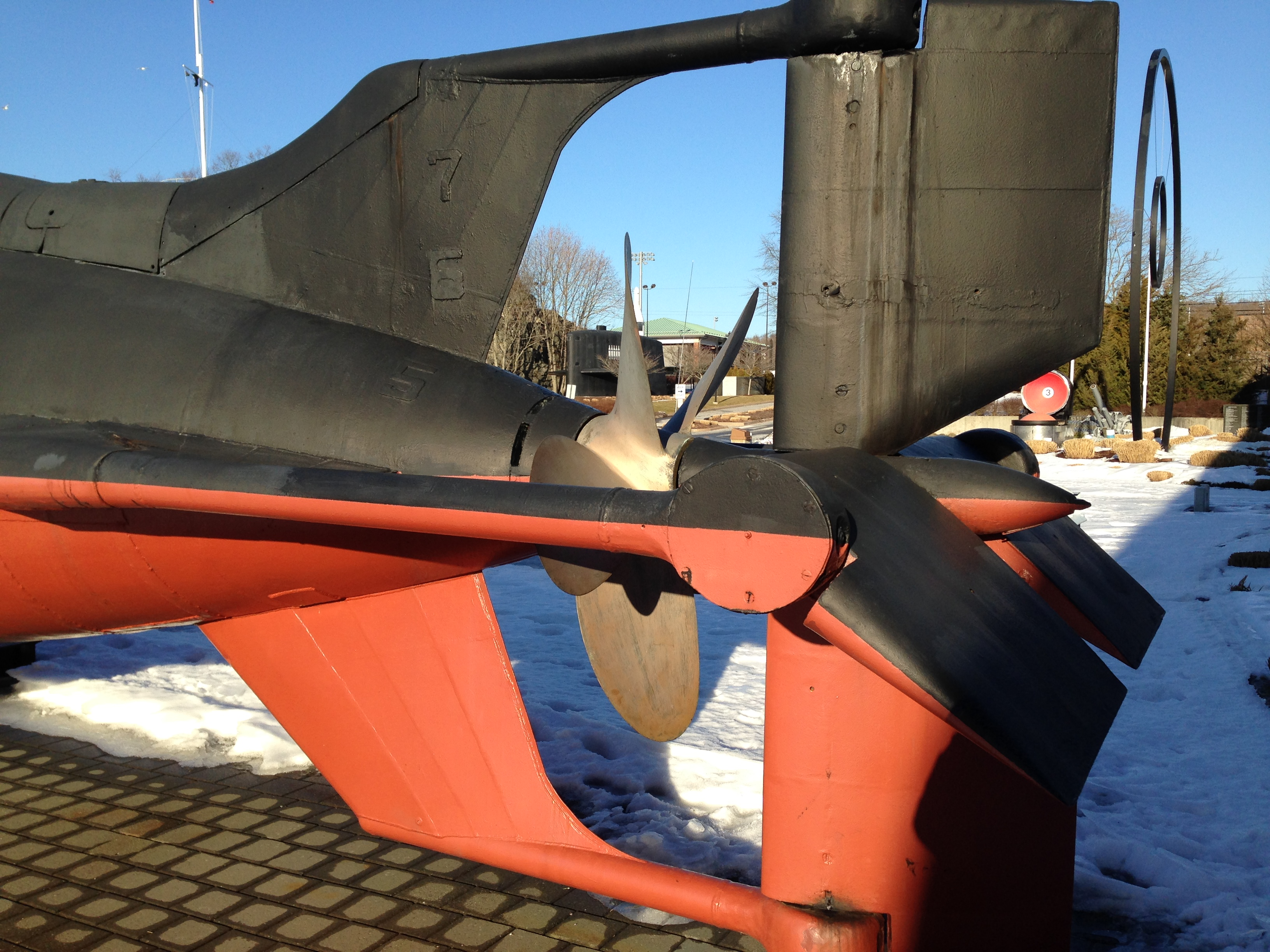
The stern section of X-1

== Toy Version ==
The Lionel 3330 "Commando" submarine is based on the X-1's design. LIONEL TRAINS 3330
