= Algoma Foundry and Machine Company =

- Formerly: A. Hamacek and Company
- Industry: Agricultural Products
- Founded: 1883
- Founders: Adolph and Anton Hamacek
- Defunct: 1962
- Successor: Badger Northland, Inc
- Headquarters: Algoma, Wisconsin
- Products: Agricultural Products
- Brands: OK

The Algoma Foundry and Machine Company of Algoma, Wisconsin began its corporate existence in 1883 as a regional manufacturer of horse-drawn farm machinery. However, in 1920 the company started making the "OK" silo filler or stationary ensilage harvester. Immediately following its introduction the OK silo filler became very popular with the dairy farming market across the Upper Midwest of the United States. Sales of the OK soon made the Algoma Company a leading producer of silo fillers in the entire nation.

The Algoma Foundry and Machine Company was founded in 1883 as A. Hamacek and Company by Adolph and Anton Hamacek of Algoma Wisconsin. The Company manufactured horse-drawn farm machinery for the regional market. However, on August 28, 1891, Adolph Hamacek left the business partnership and moved to nearby Sturgeon Bay, Wisconsin. Anton continued to operate the business alone at the building located in the 600 block of Fremont Street in Algoma until 1893, when he formed another partnership with Joseph Wodsedalek and August Ziemer.

On August 6, 1895, fire broke out at the building that on Fremont Street that served as the Foundry's place of business. The two-story building was totally destroyed by the fire. Consequently, following the fire the business obtained new property located north of the Ahnapee River, just east of the Fourth Street Bridge in Algoma. This property was owned by John Ihlenfeld who happened to be the father-in-law of Joseph Wodsedalek. The business was fortunate to obtain this property because it was served by the nearby depot of the Ahnapee and Western Railway located just south of the Ahnapee River.

Based on the new transportation opportunities opened up by the connection with the Ahnapee and Western Railway the foundry entered a period of business expansion as they began to serve the farming market of the entire multi-state upper Midwest area of the United States.

In 1962, the company was sold for $800,000 to Badger Northland, Inc, of Kaukauna, Wisconsin, a manufacturer of mechanized farm equipment.
