= Kewaunee County Sheriff's Residence and Jail =

- U.S. National Register of Historic Places
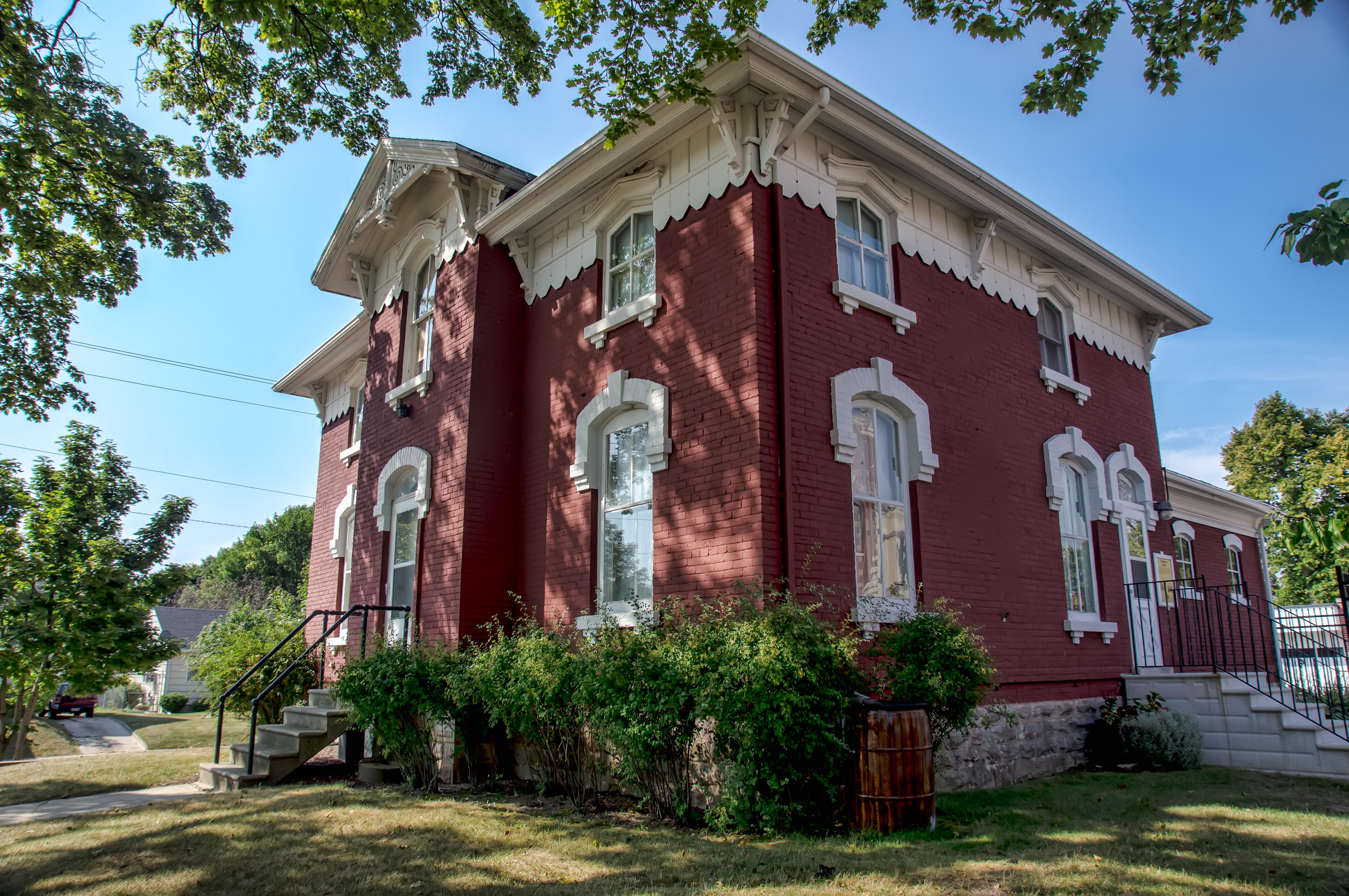
- The residence and jail in 2012

- Location within Wisconsin
- Location: Court House Sq., jct. of Dodge and Vliet Sts., Kewaunee, Wisconsin
- Coordinates: 44°27′23.1″N 87°30′17.9″W
- Area: less than one acre
- Built: 1876
- Architect: Waters, William; Janda, John
- Architectural style: Italianate
- NRHP reference No.: 96000728
- Added to NRHP: July 5, 1996

Kewaunee County Sheriff's Residence and Jail is a building in Kewaunee, Wisconsin, located at 613 Dodge Street on the southeast corner of the courthouse square. It was built in 1876 as the sheriff's office, residence, and county jail. The building was added to the National Register of Historic Places in 1996.

It is now used as the Kewaunee County Historical Society Jail Museum and features exhibits of local history.

== History ==
The jail was built in the same block as an early 1858 jail. The block had been deeded to the county by two local property owners in support of community demand for a jail. The 1858 jail was burned by a prisoner in 1859, the jail relocated to another location between 1862 and 1876. That building was judged as unfit for occupation by 1874, the Residence and Jail building was authorized in 1875 and construction was completed by the next year. It was built next to a courthouse constructed on the block in 1873.

The residence portion of the building is two stories high and three bays wide. The jail is a one-story wing, three bays long, attached at the rear of the residence on the west facing side. There are six cells in the jail, constructed of armor plate. They are in nearly original condition, though they have been modified with museum displays.

As was typical for rural sheriffs of that day, there was no formal law enforcement training. Once elected, the sheriff and his (almost all were men) family moved into the residence. The sheriff was responsible for guarding and maintaining the prisoners. Local lore holds that the sheriff's wife provided meals. Records show that most Kewaunee sheriffs prior to 1926 served only one two-year term, sheriffs from 1926 to 1945 served two or three terms. Aside from jail warden tasks, the sheriff's duties ran the gamut from felony investigations, fugitive arrests, and alcohol related issues, as well as driver's permits in later years.

The building served as the center of law enforcement for the county until 1945. It was converted to a local history museum in 1970. A 1902 replacement courthouse built at the location of the 1873 courthouse, and the present public safety building, occupy the rest of the block.
