= Menasha (YTB-773) =

Tugboat of the United States Navy

History

United States
- Awarded: 25 June 1963
- Builder: Jakobson Shipyard, Oyster Bay, Long Island, New York
- Launched: 4 November 1964
- Sponsored by: Mrs. E. J. Stock
- Acquired: 6 January 1965
- Out of service: 15 June 1986
- Reclassified: YTM-761 September 1965
- Identification: IMO number: 8871027; MMSI number: 316006563; Callsign: CFH2894
- Fate: Sold into commercial service

General characteristics
- Class & type: Natick-class large harbor tug
- Displacement: 205 long tons (208 t) (full)^{a}
- Length: 85 ft (26 m)^{a}
- Beam: 24 ft (7.3 m)^{a}
- Draft: 11 ft (3.4 m)^{a}
- Speed: 12 knots (14 mph; 22 km/h)
- Complement: 12
- Armament: None

Menasha (YTB-773) was a United States Navy Natick-class large harbor tug named for Menasha, Wisconsin.

== Construction ==
The contract for Menasha was awarded 25 June 1963. She was laid down at Oyster Bay, Long Island, New York, by Jakobson Shipyard and launched 4 November 1964. Her sponsor was Mrs. E. J. Stock.

== Operational history ==
Menasha was assigned to the 5th Naval District, Norfolk, Virginia. She was reclassified YTM‑761 in September 1965. In the summer of 1966, Menasha was assigned to the 4th Naval District and the Philadelphia Naval Shipyard.

On 15 June 1986, Menasha was placed out of service and transferred to the Maritime Administration. Other sources indicate that Menasha was transferred to the National Defense Reserve Fleet in 1986, St. Lawrence SDC in 1989, sold as Menasha in 1995, and is now Escorte.

== Notes ==
^a Details of Menasha's characteristics are scarce. Details listed here are those of her sister ship Mascoutah (YTB-772)., expected to be substantially similar given that both were built by the same shipyard and both were ultimately reclassified YTM.

Menasha was sunk in the St. Lawrence River near Ogdensburg, NY, and refloated c; 08/10/1992
