= Mascoutah (YTB-772) =

Tugboat of the United States Navy

History

United States
- Name: Mascoutah
- Namesake: Mascoutah, Illinois
- Awarded: 25 June 1963^{a}
- Builder: Jakobson Shipyard, Oyster Bay, Long Island, New York
- Yard number: 420
- Launched: 22 July 1964
- Sponsored by: Mrs. E. D. Kimball
- Out of service: 1986
- Reclassified: YTM-760, September 1965
- Fate: Sold to Canada, 1992

Canada
- Name: 1992-2001: Eddie Mac I from 2001: Atlantic Aspen
- Owner: from 2001 Atlantic Towing Ltd, Saint John, New Brunswick
- Identification: IMO number: 9060443
- Status: In service

General characteristics
- Class & type: Natick-class large harbor tug
- Displacement: 205 long tons (208 t) (full)
- Length: 85 ft (26 m)
- Beam: 24 ft (7.3 m)
- Draft: 11 ft (3.4 m)
- Speed: 12 knots (14 mph; 22 km/h)
- Complement: 12
- Armament: None

Mascoutah (YTB-772) was a United States Navy Natick-class large harbor tug named for Mascoutah, Illinois.

== Construction ==
The contract for Mascoutah was awarded on 25 June 1963^{a}. She was laid down at Oyster Bay, Long Island, New York, by Jakobson Shipyard as Yard Number 420 and launched on 22 July 1964. Her sponsor was Mrs. E. D. Kimball.

== Operational history ==
Mascoutah entered service in August 1964 and was initially assigned to duty in the 5th Naval District, Norfolk, Virginia. Reclassified YTM‑760 in September 1965, she served out of Norfolk until the summer of 1966 when she arrived in Philadelphia for duty in the 4th Naval District.

On 15 June 1986, Mascoutah was withdrawn from service and transferred to the Maritime Administration and placed in the National Defense Reserve Fleet, then transferred to the Saint Lawrence Seaway Development Corporation in 1989. In 1992, she was sold to Canadian owners as Eddie Mac I, and since 2001 has been operated by Atlantic Towing Ltd of Saint John, New Brunswick as Atlantic Aspen.

== Notes ==
^a The contract award date is presumed to be the same date as Menasha (YTB-773) given that both were built by the same shipyard and both were ultimately reclassified YTM.
