= Ahnapee Brewery =

Historic building in Algoma, Wisconsin, US

- U.S. National Register of Historic Places
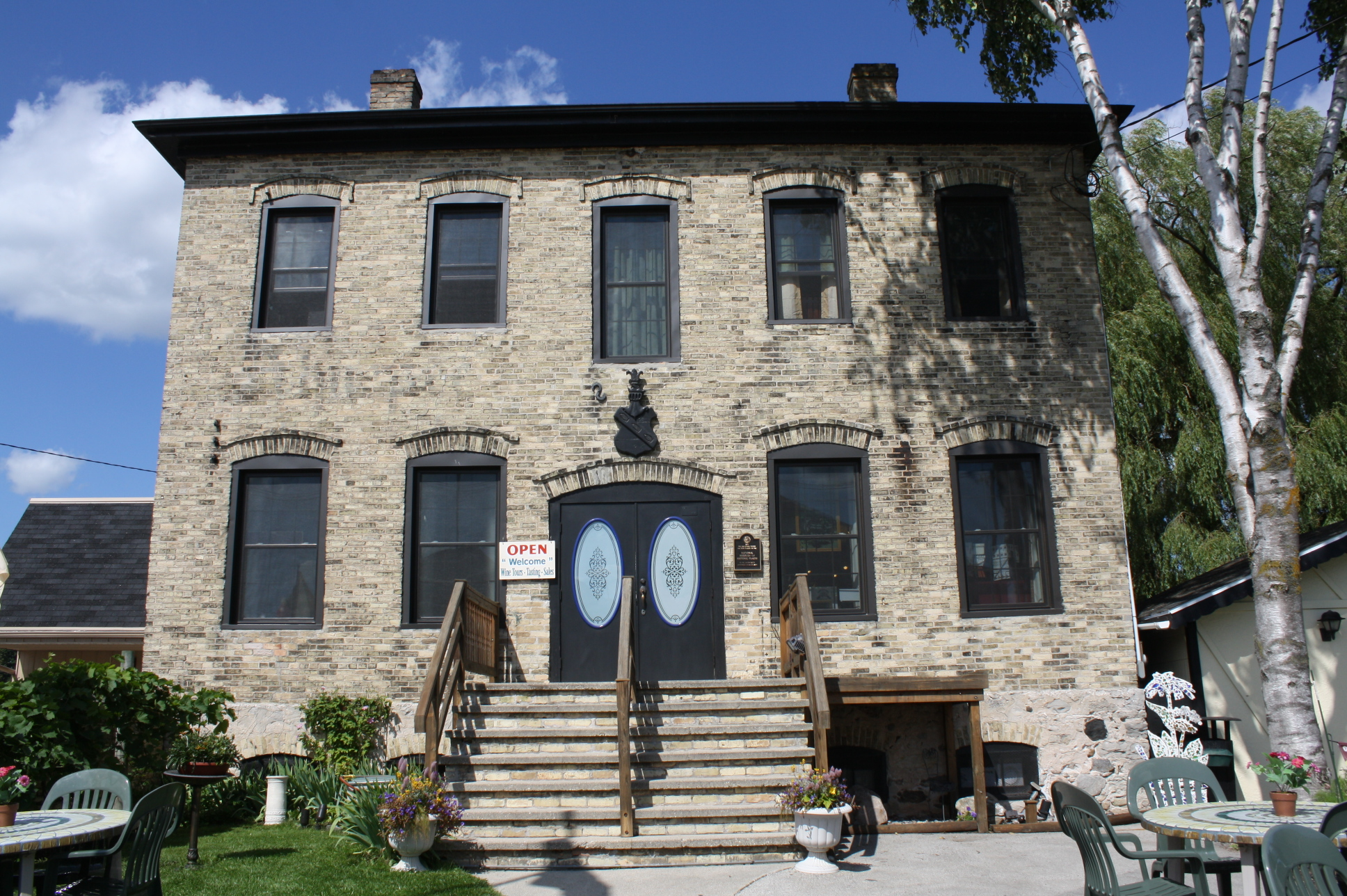
- Ahnapee Brewery

- Location within Wisconsin Location within the United States
- Location: 115 Navarino St., Algoma, Wisconsin
- Coordinates: 44°36′35″N 87°26′07″W
- Area: less than one acre
- Architectural style: Mid 19th Century Revival
- NRHP reference No.: 94000597
- Added to NRHP: June 17, 1994

The Ahnapee Brewery building is located in Algoma, Wisconsin.

== History ==
The building served as a brewery until 1890. It went on to be used as a warehouse, a fly net factory, a washing machine factory, and a feed storage facility. Currently, it serves as a winery. The building was added to the State and the National Register of Historic Places in 1994.

In 2013, Ahnapee Brewery was re-imagined & reopened in a two-stall-garage-turned-taproom, two doors down from the original 1800s brewery location on Navarino St. In 2022, the taproom moved from Navarino St. to the corner of Clark St. & 2nd Street in Algoma. In 2020, Ahnapee Brewery opened a second location in Suamico, WI, which houses all of the brewery's production and another taproom.
