= Algoma, Wisconsin =

- City
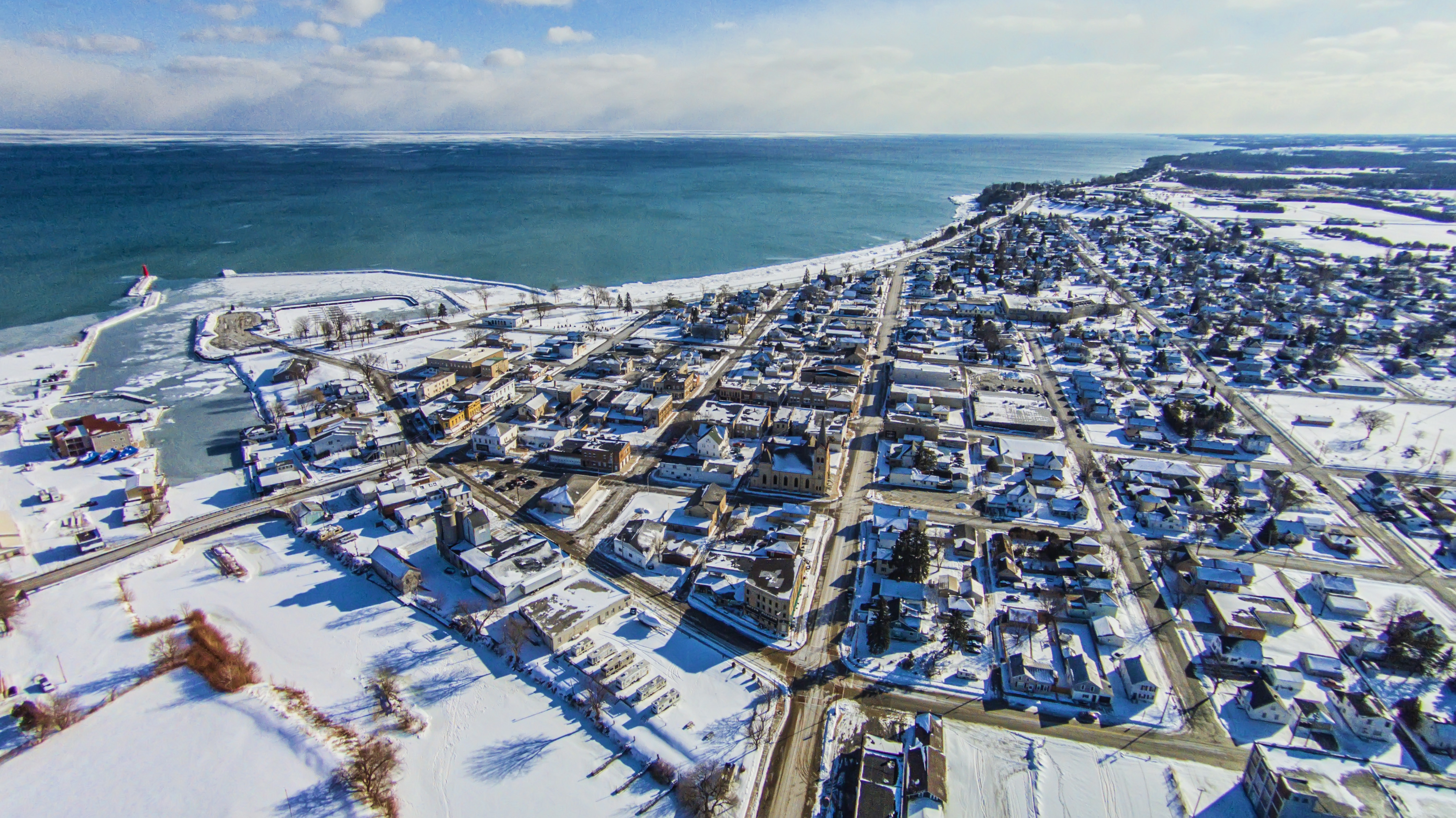
- Aerial view of Algoma

- Location of Algoma in Kewaunee County, Wisconsin.

- Location within Wisconsin Location within the United States
- Coordinates: 44°36′30″N 87°26′32″W
- Country: United States
- State: Wisconsin
- County: Kewaunee

Area
  - Total: 2.50 sq mi (6.48 km^{2})
  - Land: 2.46 sq mi (6.36 km^{2})
  - Water: 0.042 sq mi (0.11 km^{2})
- Elevation: 581 ft (177 m)

Population (2020)
  - Total: 3,243
  - Density: 1,240.8/sq mi (479.07/km^{2})
- Time zone: UTC-6 (Central (CST))
  - Summer (DST): UTC-5 (CDT)
- ZIP code(s): 54201
- Area code: 920
- FIPS code: 55-01000
- GNIS feature ID: 1560759
- Website: www.algomacity.org

Algoma (/ælˈɡoʊmə/ al-GOH-mə) is a city in Kewaunee County, Wisconsin, United States. The population was 3,243 at the 2020 census. It is located on Lake Michigan at the mouth of the Ahnapee River, 30 miles (48 km) east of Green Bay.

== History ==
The Ahnapee settlement, which eventually became known as Algoma, was founded in 1834 by Joseph McCormick of Manitowoc. In 1851, Irish and English pioneers moved to the area and called the place Wolf River. The wolf was a legendary animal in stories told by the local Potawatomi Indians. (This animal eventually became the mascot of the Algoma High School.) In the Menominee language, the town is known as Ākem, meaning "snowshoe".

In the mid-19th century, immigrants from Germany, Bohemia, Scandinavia, and Belgium settled in the community. The earliest businesses consisted of a sawmill, a general store, and churches. In 1859, the name of the town was changed from Wolf to Ahnapee a corruption of the Chippewa anin api meaning "when". The town which surrounds Algoma still bears this name. Another transliteration from the indigenous name is an-an-api-sebe, which fits the structure of the Menominee "wanānepeh-sēpēw" meaning "upstream river." While this specific phrasing refers to the river, wanānepeh was eventually used for the town in a shortened form (it is extremely common in Menominee speech to drop the first light syllable of a word, which in this case would produce the perceived term "ānepeh," rendered as "Ahnapee"). This translation also fits perfectly in meaning, as the southern fishing villages between Algoma and Kewaunee were the southernmost extent of the Menominee heartland, thus making Wanānepeh-Sēpēw a gateway to the upstream core.

In 1871, the town survived the Peshtigo Fire that swept from Green Bay and destroyed thousands of acres of land. Local residents were prepared to escape from the fire, but torrential rains extinguished it just before it reached Ahnapee.

Growth and development in Ahnapee was greatly advanced in 1892 with the arrival of the Ahnapee and Western Railway, which connected the coastal town with the Kewaunee Green Bay and Western Railroad at Casco Junction. The railroad would connect Algoma with the rest of the nation's rail system for 94 years. Several factories were built in Ahnapee as a result of the railroad's arrival, including the Ahnapee Seating & Veneer Company. This industry would change owners and names through the years, and operated until 2017 when it closed its doors.

Ahnapee incorporated as a city on February 23, 1879. In 1897, the city was renamed Algoma, a name which may have come from an Indian term for "park of flowers". (See also Algoma (word)). The name was changed by action of the Wisconsin state legislature. As a result, the local newspaper also changed its name from the Ahnapee Record to the Algoma Record. At that time the commercial fishing fleet located in Algoma was the largest on Lake Michigan. Sport fishing is still a major tourist attraction today.

In 2020, Algoma was awarded the All-America City Award for its plan to counter long-running brain drain, which included a student mentoring program, student vocational opportunities, and a community wellness and fitness center.

== Geography ==
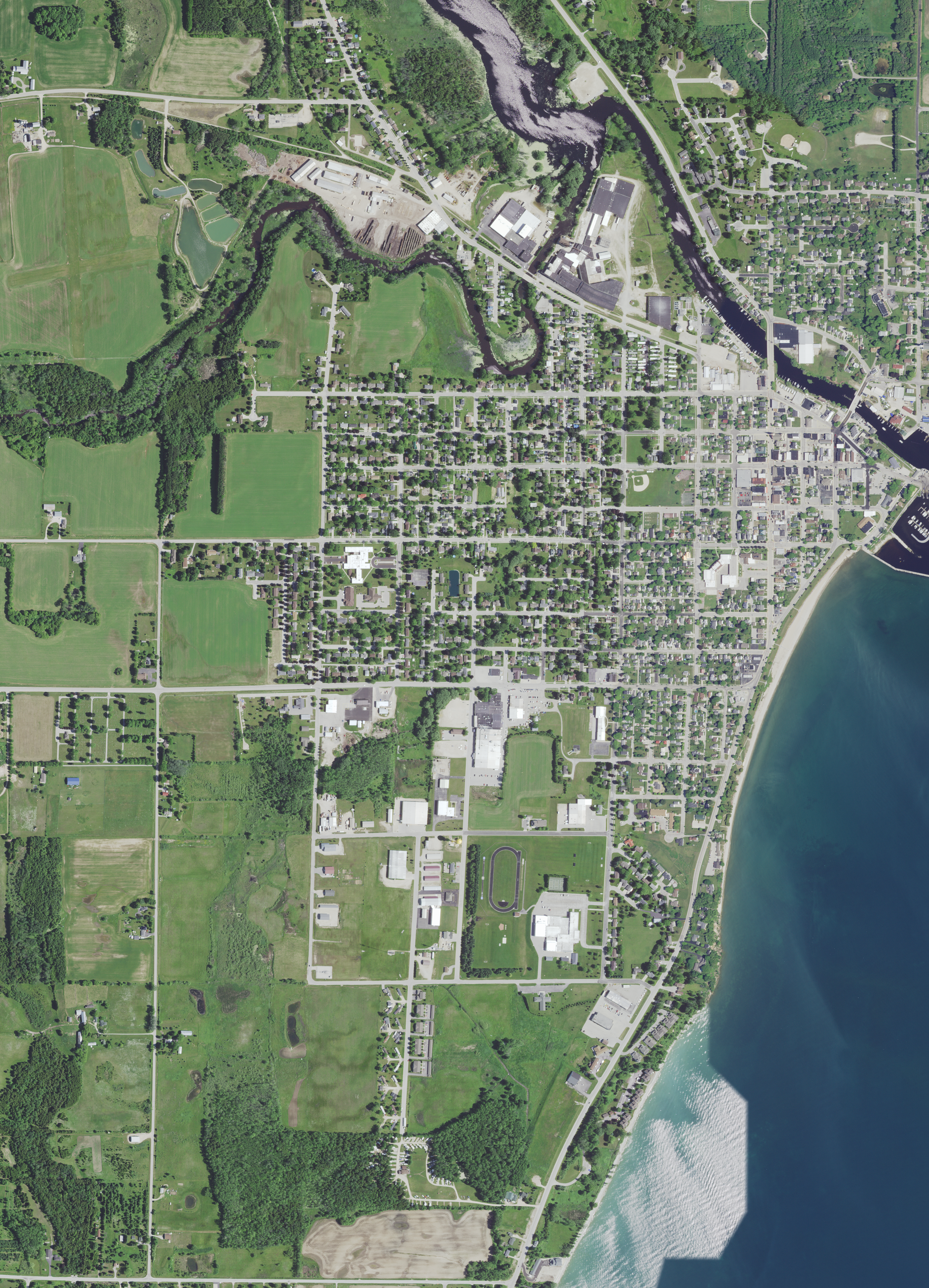
Satellite view of Algoma

Algoma is located at 44°36′30″N 87°26′32″W (44.608226, -87.442342), on the western shore of Lake Michigan at the mouth of the Ahnapee River.

According to the United States Census Bureau, the city has a total area of 2.51 square miles (6.50 km^{2}), of which 2.47 square miles (6.40 km^{2}) is land and 0.04 square miles (0.10 km^{2}) is water.

== Demographics ==
Historical population
Census	Pop.	Note	%±
1880	948		—
1890	1,015		7.1%
1900	1,738		71.2%
1910	2,082		19.8%
1920	1,911		−8.2%
1930	2,202		15.2%
1940	2,652		20.4%
1950	3,384		27.6%
1960	3,855		13.9%
1970	4,023		4.4%
1980	3,656		−9.1%
1990	3,353		−8.3%
2000	3,357		0.1%
2010	3,167		−5.7%
2020	3,243		2.4%
U.S. Decennial Census

=== 2010 census ===
As of the census of 2010, there were 3,167 people, 1,406 households, and 862 families residing in the city. The population density was 1,282.2 inhabitants per square mile (495.1/km^{2}). There were 1,702 housing units at an average density of 689.1 per square mile (266.1/km^{2}). The racial makeup of the city was 95.1% White, 0.9% African American, 0.6% Native American, 0.3% Asian, 2.1% from other races, and 1.1% from two or more races. Hispanic or Latino of any race were 2.9% of the population.

There were 1,406 households, of which 24.1% had children under the age of 18 living with them, 47.5% were married couples living together, 9.5% had a female householder with no husband present, 4.3% had a male householder with no wife present, and 38.7% were non-families. 34.4% of all households were made up of individuals, and 16.8% had someone living alone who was 65 years of age or older. The average household size was 2.21 and the average family size was 2.82.

The median age in the city was 44.6 years. 21% of residents were under the age of 18; 6.2% were between the ages of 18 and 24; 23.4% were from 25 to 44; 28.8% were from 45 to 64; and 20.7% were 65 years of age or older. The gender makeup of the city was 48.6% male and 51.4% female.

=== 2000 census ===
As of the census of 2000, there were 3,357 people, 1,493 households, and 900 families residing in the city. The population density was 1,374.9 people per square mile (531.2/km^{2}). There were 1,632 housing units at an average density of 668.4 per square mile (258.2/km^{2}). The racial makeup of the city was 98.42% White, 0.09% African American, 0.30% Native American, 0.06% Asian, 0.51% from other races, and 0.63% from two or more races. Hispanic or Latino of any race were 0.98% of the population.

There were 1,493 households, out of which 24.0% had children under the age of 18 living with them, 49.2% were married couples living together, 7.6% had a female householder with no husband present, and 39.7% were non-families. 35.5% of all households were made up of individuals, and 19.0% had someone living alone who was 65 years of age or older. The average household size was 2.19 and the average family size was 2.85.

In the city, the population was spread out, with 21.1% under the age of 18, 7.3% from 18 to 24, 26.5% from 25 to 44, 22.9% from 45 to 64, and 22.3% who were 65 years of age or older. The median age was 42 years. For every 100 females, there were 88.9 males. For every 100 females age 18 and over, there were 86.4 males.

The median income for a household in the city was $35,029, and the median income for a family was $46,552. Males had a median income of $30,349 versus $22,650 for females. The per capita income for the city was $18,043. About 3.4% of families and 5.2% of the population were below the poverty line, including 7.1% of those under age 18 and 6.4% of those age 65 or over.

== Arts and culture ==
Every year since 2000, the annual Algoma Car Show is held in the downtown area, featuring classic cars and trucks. Shanty Days is an annual celebration held the second weekend of August. There are ethnic foods, music, and beer. Features also include an arts and crafts show, a used-book sale, a parade, a 5k run/walk, wine tasting, fireworks and a street fair. The Concerts in the Park Series takes place in July and August in Heritage Park. The concerts are sponsored by the city of Algoma and local businesses. Soar on the Shore Kite and Beach Festival, a free family fun event with professional kiters, crafts, and other activities for children, is held annually on the third full weekend of August.

== Education ==
The city is served by the public Algoma School District, which includes one elementary school and Algoma High School.

== Transportation ==
- WIS 42 Northbound travels to Sturgeon Bay. South it continues into Kewaunee.
- WIS 54 connects with Green Bay westbound.
- The Ahnapee State Trail, partly coinciding with the Ice Age Trail, connects Algoma with Forestville to the north. The Ice Age trail continues to Kewaunee, but the Ahnapee Trail connects Algoma to Casco.

== Notable people ==
- Harris Burgoyne, former mayor of Green Bay, Wisconsin (buried in Algoma)
- Richard W. Fellows, U.S. Air Force Brigadier General
- Lawrence Johnson, Wisconsin State Representative
- Maynard T. Parker, Wisconsin State Assemblyperson and jurist
- M. W. Perry, Wisconsin State Senator
- Mark Francis Schmitt, Roman Catholic Bishop
- Albert D. Shimek, Wisconsin State Representative
- De Wayne Stebbins, Wisconsin State Senator

== Gallery ==
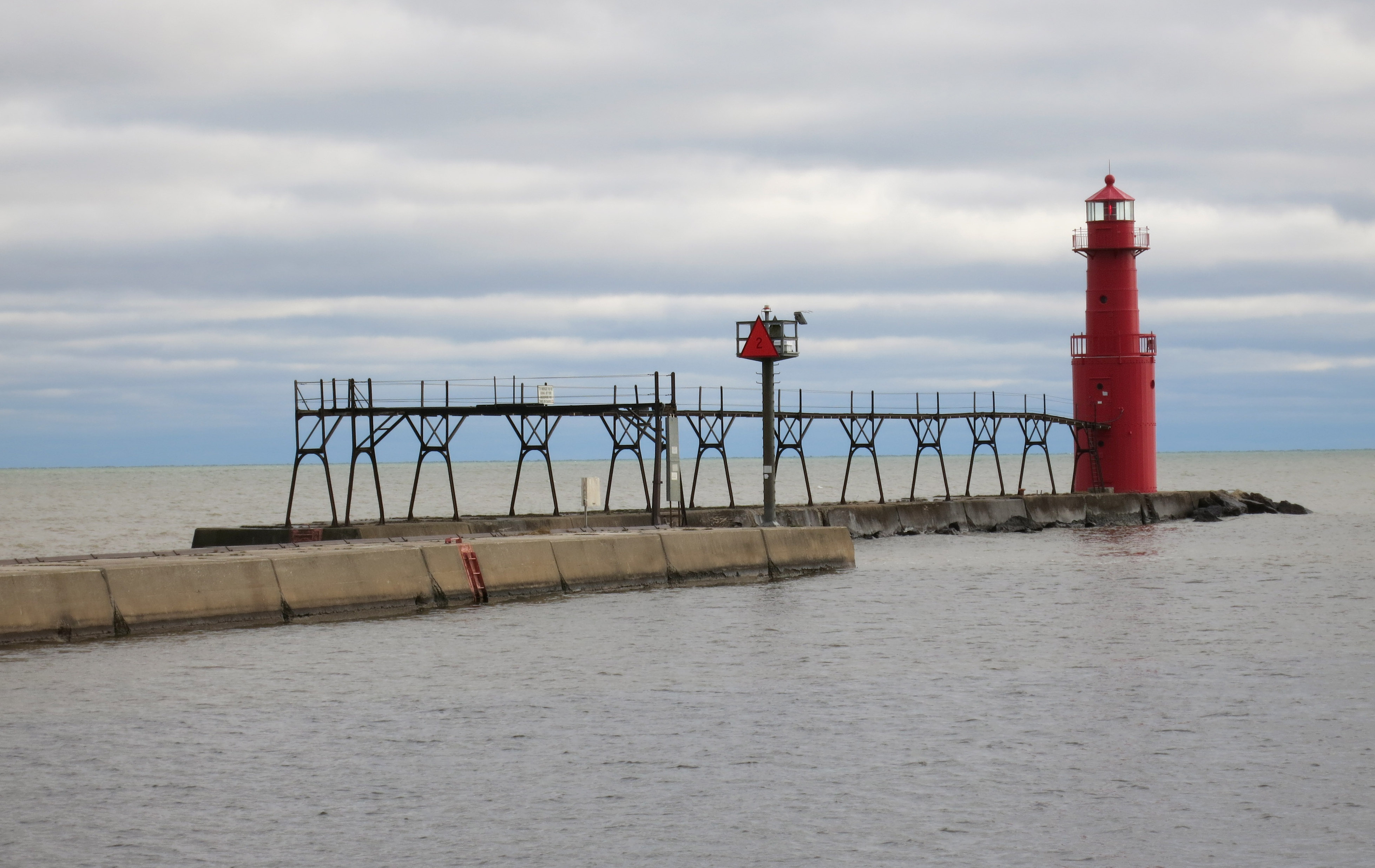
Algoma Light

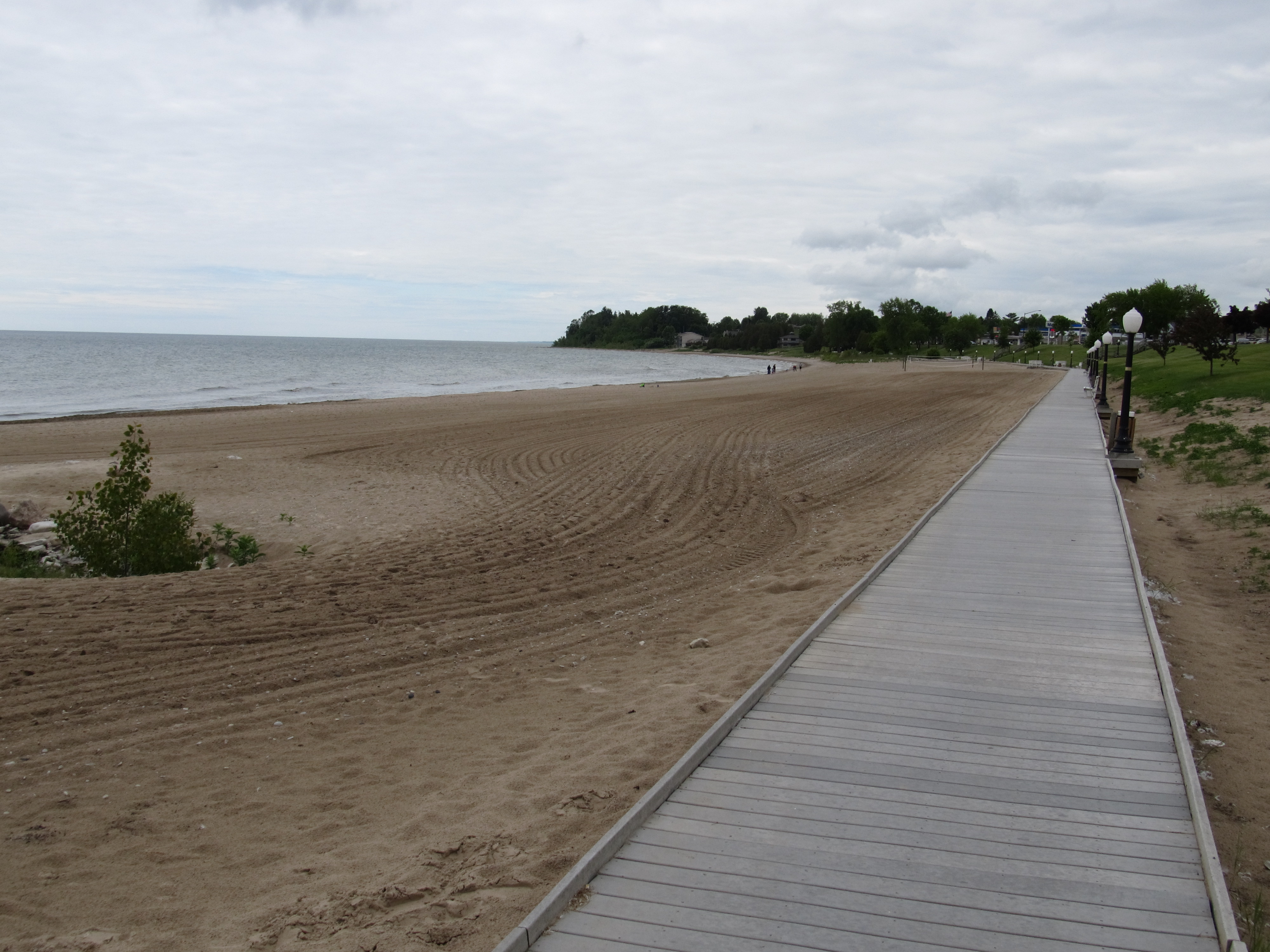
Crescent Beach boardwalk

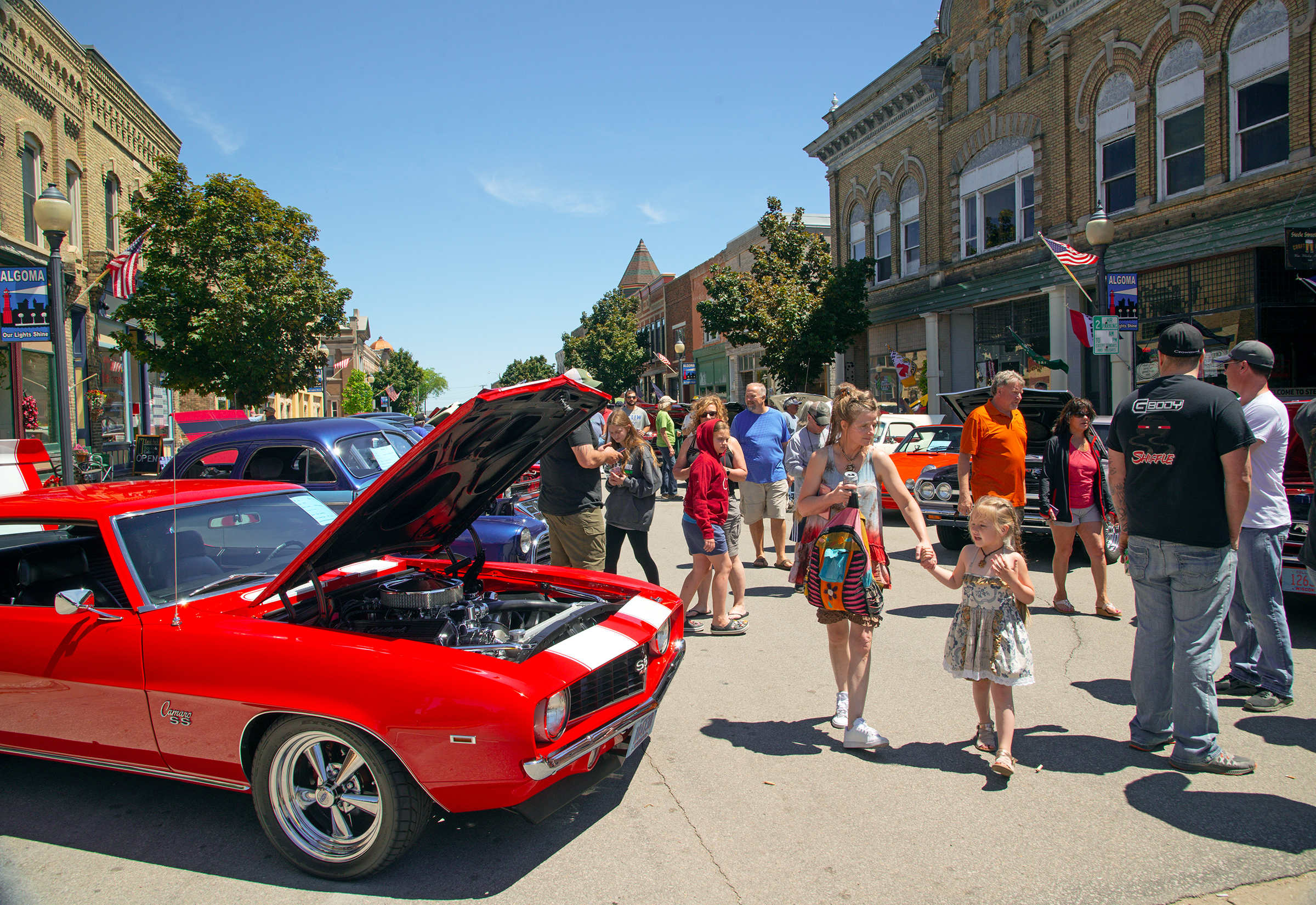
2019 Algoma Car Show

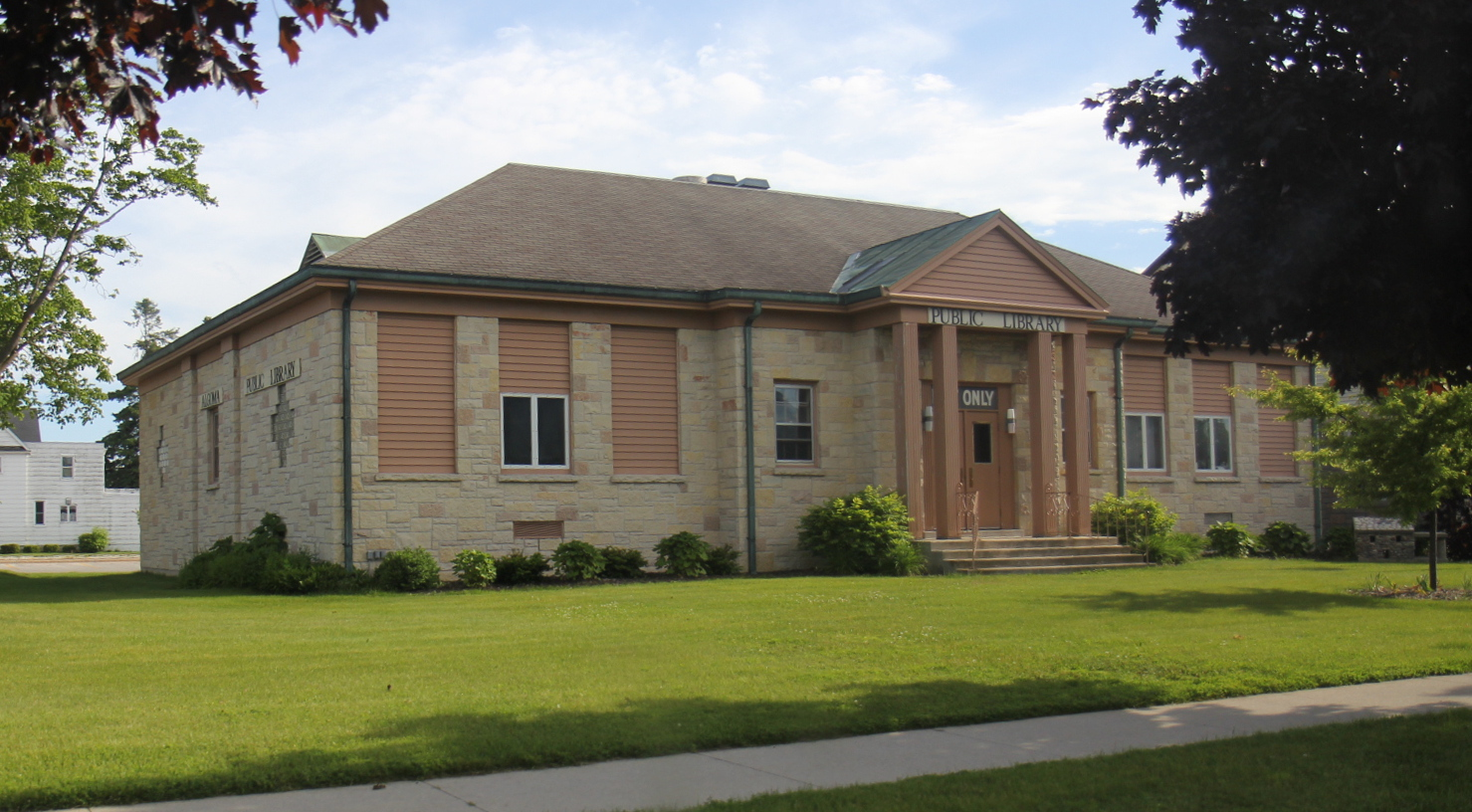
Public library

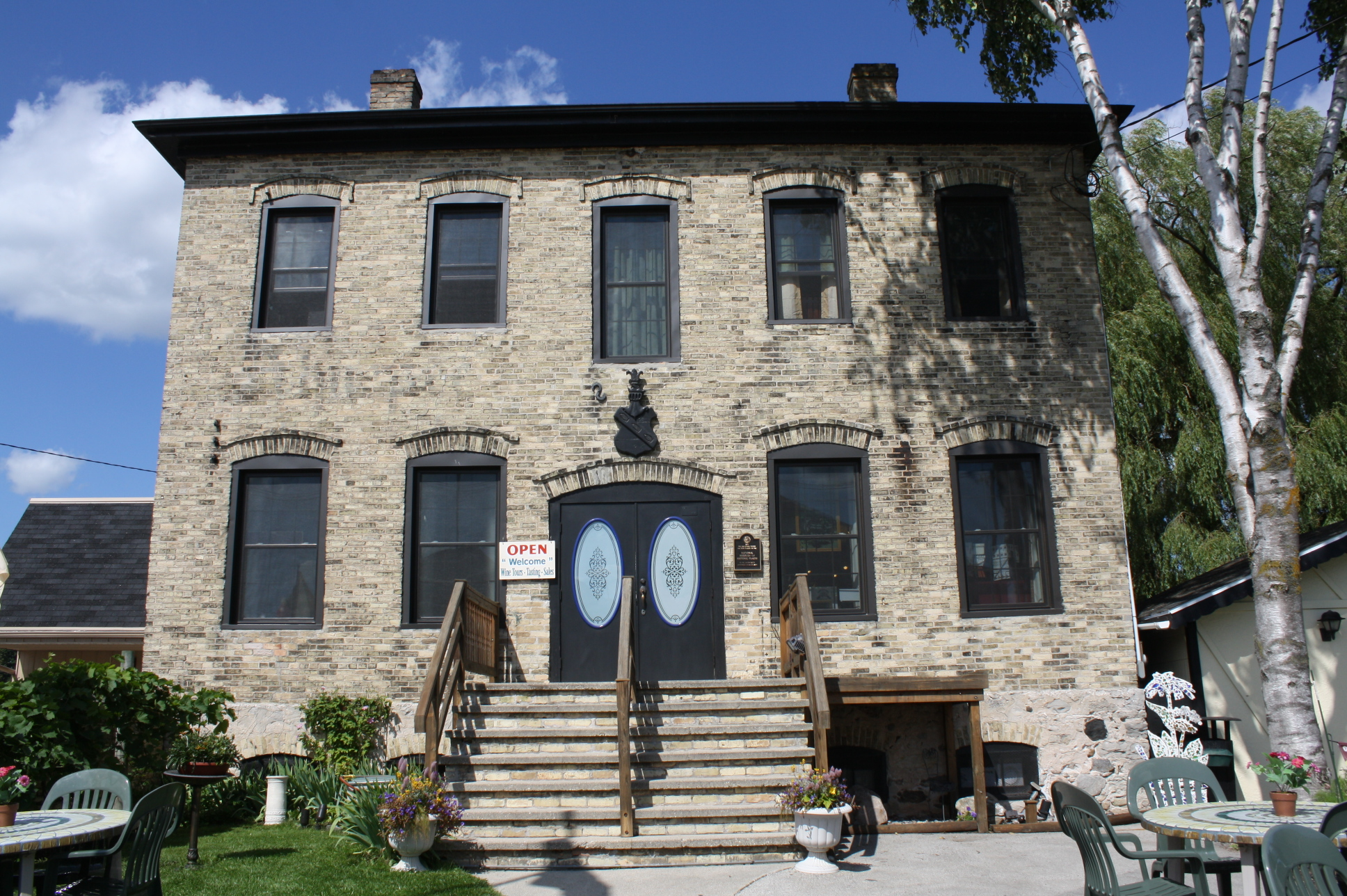
Ahnapee Brewery

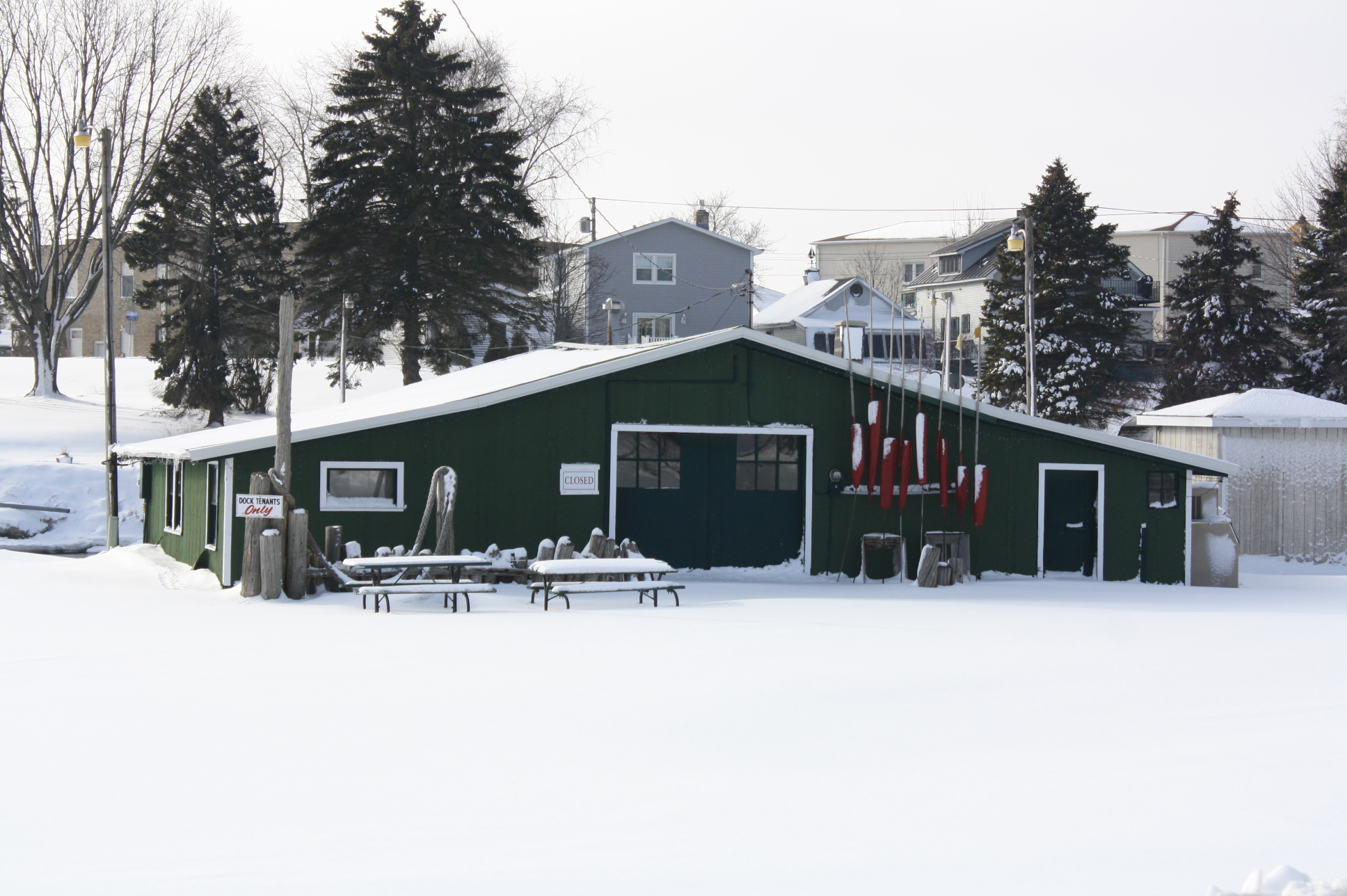
Art Dettman Fishing Shanty

== See also ==
- Algoma Foundry and Machine Company
- Algoma High School
