= Nash (tugboat) =

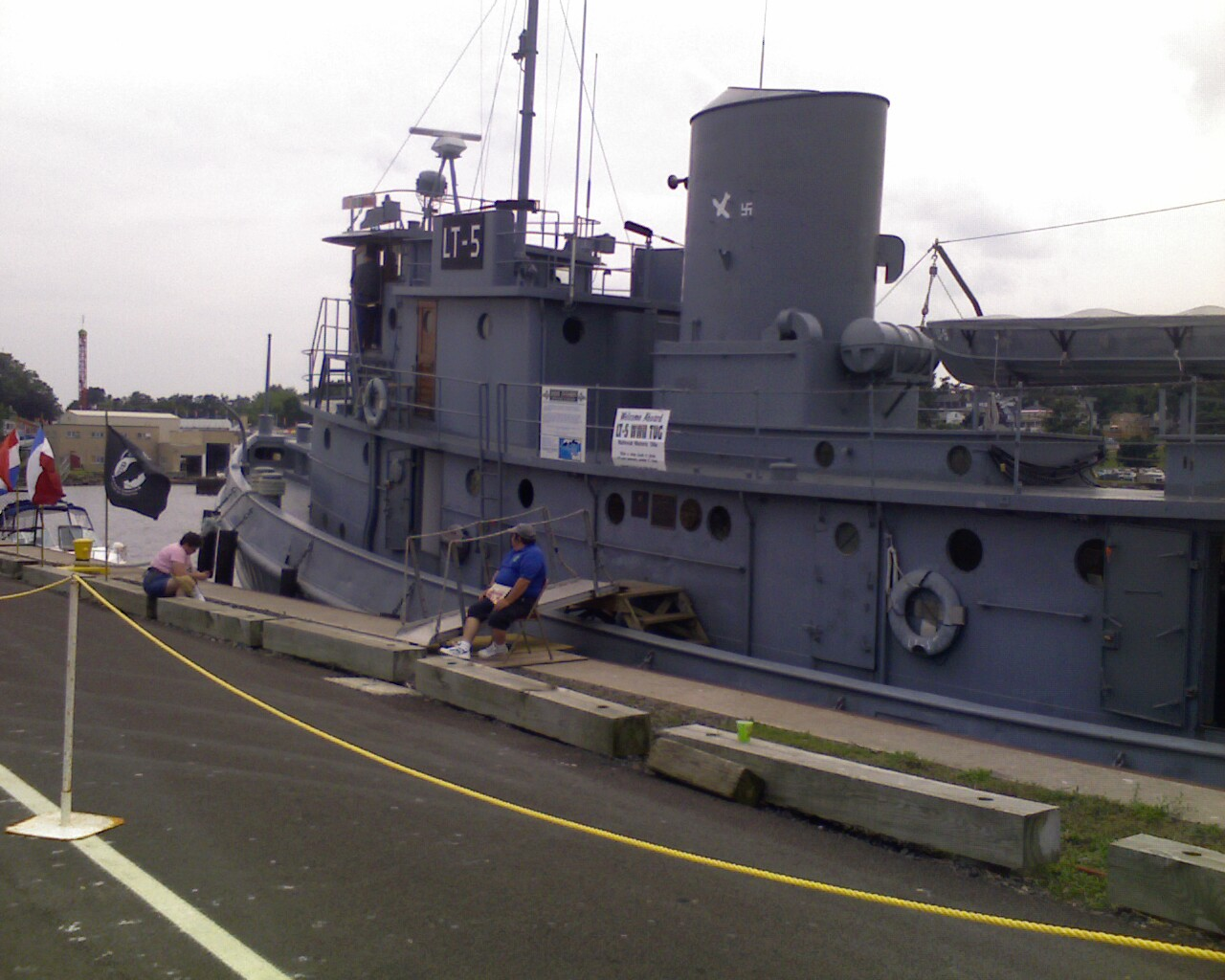
- World War II US Army Large Tug Major Elisha K. Henson (LT-5) at H. Lee White Marine Museum, Oswego, New York

History

United States
- Name: Major Elisha K. Henson
- Builder: Jakobson Shipyard, Oyster Bay New York
- Identification: LT-5
- Fate: Museum ship

General characteristics
- Type: Tugboat
- Displacement: 306 long tons (311 t)
- Length: 114.1 ft (34.8 m)
- Beam: 25 ft (7.6 m)
- Draft: 14 ft (4.3 m)
- Propulsion: Enterprise 8-cylinder diesel engine
- Speed: 11 knots (20 km/h; 13 mph)
- Major Elisha K. Henson (LT-5) ex-John F. Nash (LT-5)
- U.S. National Register of Historic Places
- U.S. National Historic Landmark
- Location within New York Location within the United States
- Location: Oswego, New York
- Coordinates: 43°27′48.5″N 76°30′56.2″W
- Built: 1943 Jakobson Shipyard, Oyster Bay NY
- Architect: Cox & Stevens
- NRHP reference No.: 91002059

Significant dates
- Added to NRHP: 4 December 1991
- Designated NHL: 4 December 1992

Nash is a World War II U.S. Army Large Tug (LT) seagoing tugboat built as hull #298 at Jakobson Shipyard, Oyster Bay, New York as a Design 271 steel-hulled Large Tug delivered in November 1943. Originally named Major Elisha K. Henson (LT-5), in 1946 she was renamed John F. Nash by the U.S. Army Corps of Engineers. Since retirement from the Corps of Engineers, LT-5 has been renamed Major Elisha K. Henson. As of the 1992 date of its listing as a National Historic Landmark, LT-5 was believed to be one of the last functional U.S. Army vessels that participated in Normandy landings.

== Service in World War II ==
LT-5 sailed to Great Britain in February 1944 in anticipation of Operation Overlord, the planned allied invasion of Europe. On June 6, 1944, LT-5 sailed for Normandy with two barges as part of Operation Mulberry, in support of Overlord. Under fire, the tug ferried supplies to the landing beaches for the next month, in the process shooting down a German fighter aircraft on June 9.

After the war, LT-5 returned to the United States. Assigned to the Buffalo District of the U.S. Army Corps of Engineers in May 1946, LT-5 was renamed John F. Nash after Buffalo District's Senior Engineer and Chief Civilian Assistant for the period 1932 to 1941. From 1946 to 1989, John F. Nash served the lower Great Lakes region by assisting in the maintenance of harbors, and construction projects that included the St. Lawrence Seaway in the 1950s.

== Post-military career ==
Renamed Major Elisha K. Henson, she has been largely restored to her original configuration by the H. Lee White Marine Museum in Oswego, New York where she is currently on display. Tours are available Mid-May through the end of September. LT-5 was declared a National Historic Landmark in 1992. A sister ship located at Kewaunee, Wisconsin, the Major Wilbur Fr. Browder (LT-4), now the Tug Ludington, is a museum ship which also served the U.S. Army at D-Day and otherwise has a similar history, which was listed on the National Register in 2002.

Major Elisha K. Henson (LT-5) (ex-Nash)
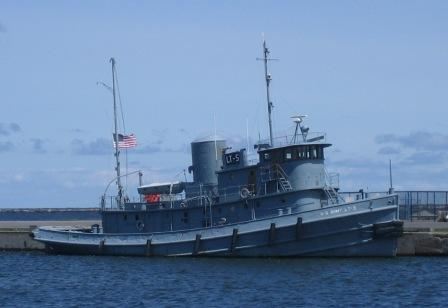
LT-5 starboard-side view, 2009.

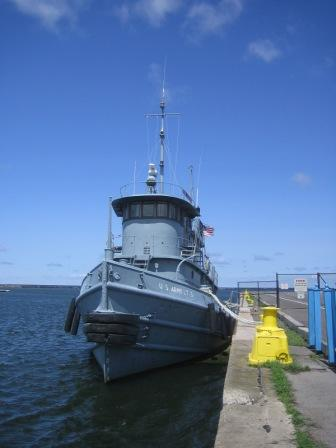
LT-5 bow view

== Awards ==
- American Campaign Medal
- European-African-Middle Eastern Campaign Medal with one campaign star
- World War II Victory Medal
- National Defense Service Medal with star
