= Algoma Light =

Algoma Pierhead Light
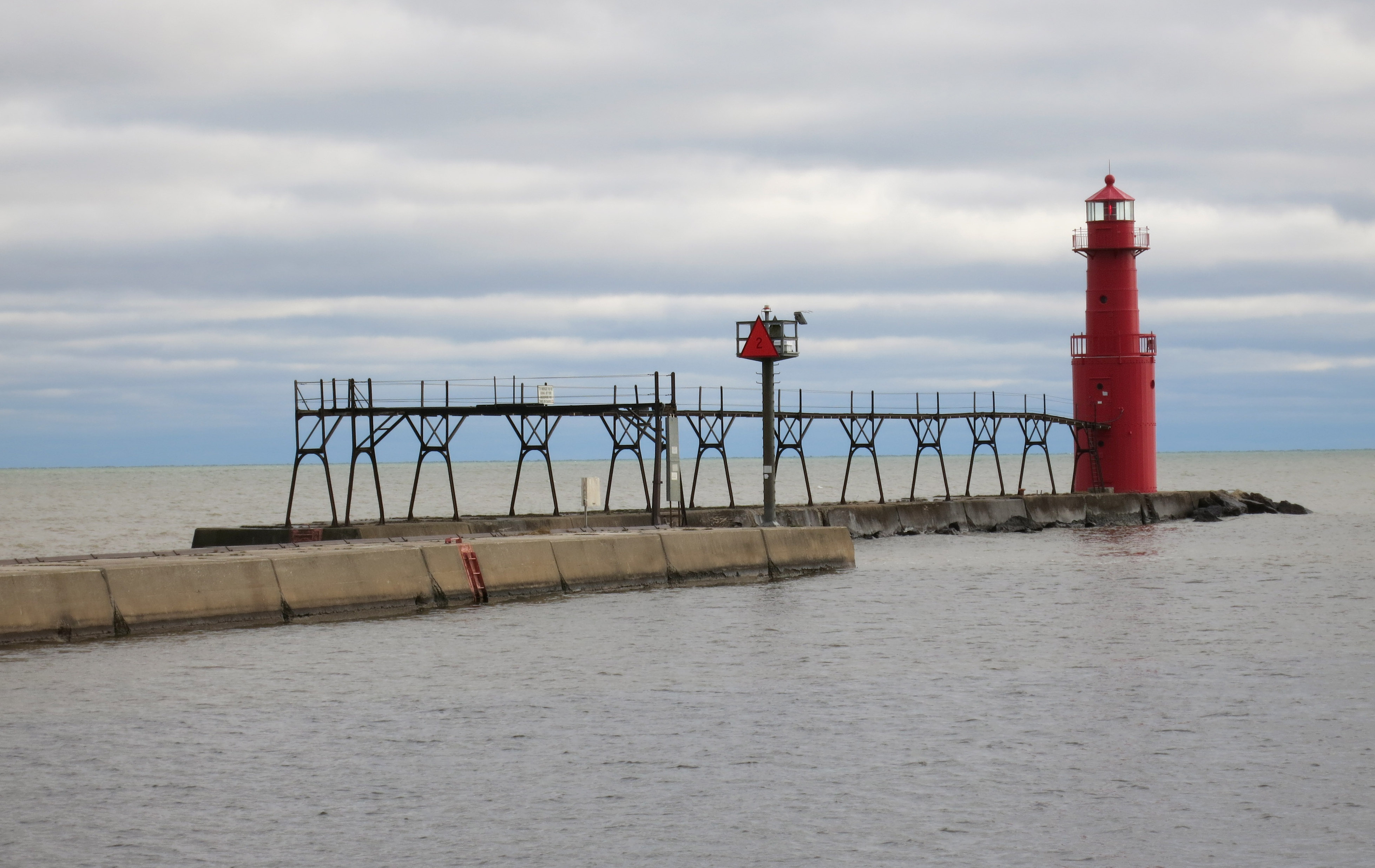
- Location: Algoma, Wisconsin
- Coordinates: 44°36′25.092″N 87°25′45.513″W

Tower
- Constructed: 1908
- Foundation: Pier
- Construction: Steel
- Automated: 1973
- Height: 48 feet (15 m)
- Shape: Red cylindrical tower

Light
- First lit: 1932
- Focal height: 14.5 m (48 ft)
- Lens: Fresnel lens
- Range: 16 nautical miles (30 km; 18 mi)
- Characteristic: Red, Isophase, 6 sec. HORN: 1 blast ev 10s (1s bl). Operated from Apr. 1 to Dec. 1 and other times as required by local conditions.

The Algoma Light or Algoma Pierhead Light is a lighthouse located near Algoma in Kewaunee County, Wisconsin.

The lighthouse was first established in 1893 as a set of range lights. It was rebuilt in 1908, at which time it was a conical tower built of 5/16-inch (7.9 mm) steel plate, 8 feet (2.4 m) in diameter at the base and 7 feet (2.1 m) in diameter at the parapet. It stood 26 feet (7.9 m) high. In 1932, it was modified again and the entire structure was raised to a height of 42 feet (13 m) by placing the older tower on a new steel base 12 feet (3.7 m) in diameter, that increased the focal height to forty-two feet. The station was automated in 1973. It is listed as number 20975 in the USCG light lists.

== History ==
The lighthouse was first established in 1893 as a set of range lights. In 1895, a fifth-order lens replaced the original lantern; increasing the effective range of the light to 11 miles. In 1907, with the keeper's accommodations still unbuilt, the wooden tower was in a significant state of distress and the decision was made to replace the tower. It was rebuilt in 1908. It stood 26 feet (7.9 m) high.

The Fresnel lens remained the source of illumination until June 5, 2019, when it was replaced with an LED light. The Fresnel lens was placed on display at the North Point Lighthouse museum in Milwaukee.

== Keepers ==
The Light has had several keepers throughout its long history even prior to the construction of the tower. Ole Hansen was the first to man the light from 1893 – 1895. Charles E. Young followed in 1895 and remained until 1899. The third keeper was Nelson Knudsen who manned it from 1899 to 1901. In 1901, Gustavus Umberham transferred to Algoma from the Cedar River Lighthouse; bringing his five children with him. Umberham drowned on February 3, 1913, during a boat trip with three acquaintances, he was swept overboard by a large wave. Eugene Kimball, a close friend of Umberham was transferred to the station in April 1913. Kimball was manned the light until 1923 when he was transferred. After Kimball left, Carl J. Graan manned the lighthouse from 1923 to 1944.

== Images ==
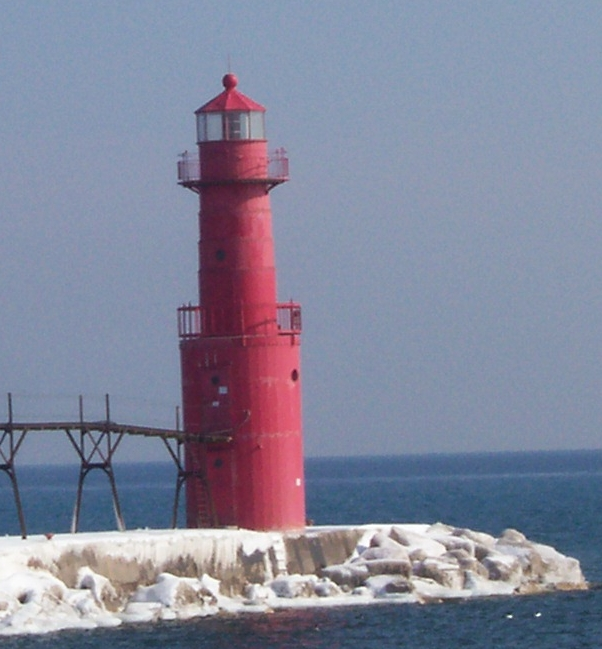

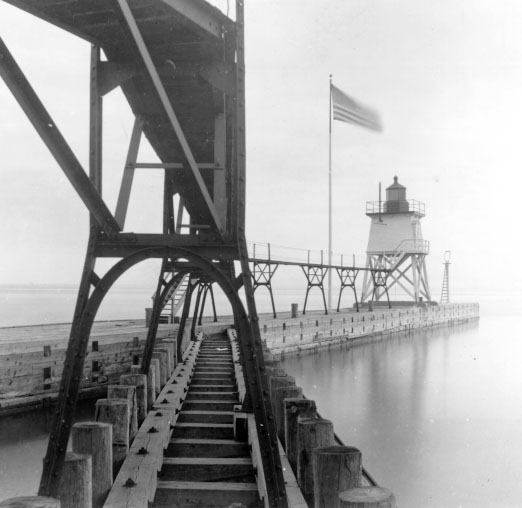
1908 Light

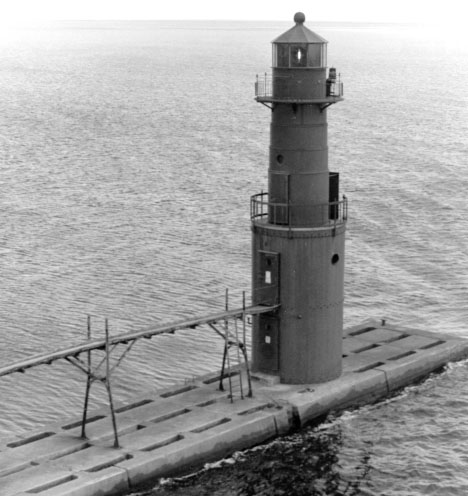
Seen shortly after 1932 modifications

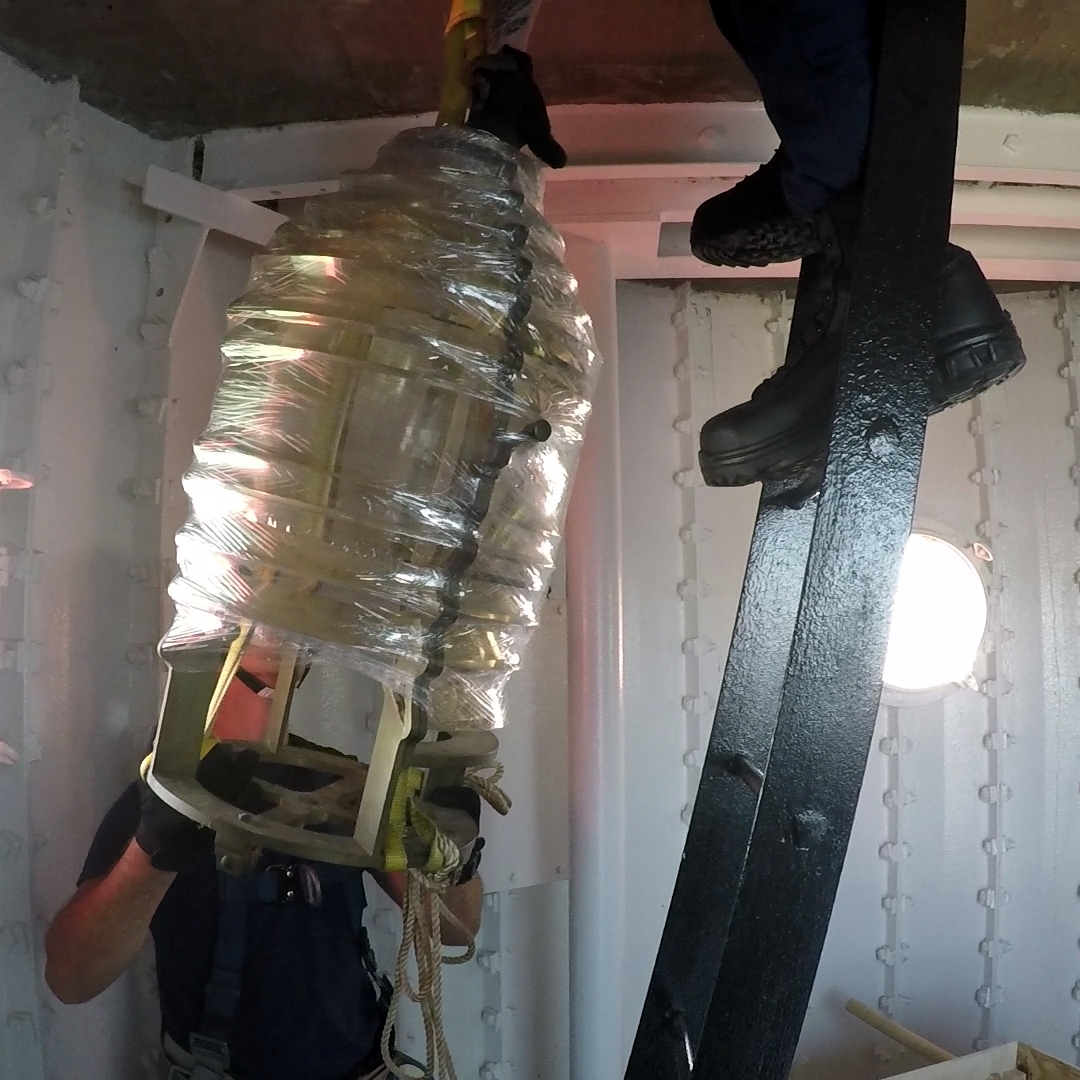
The 5th order Fresnel Lens in the Algoma Pierhead Lighthouse is lowered down the ladder to the base of the tower.

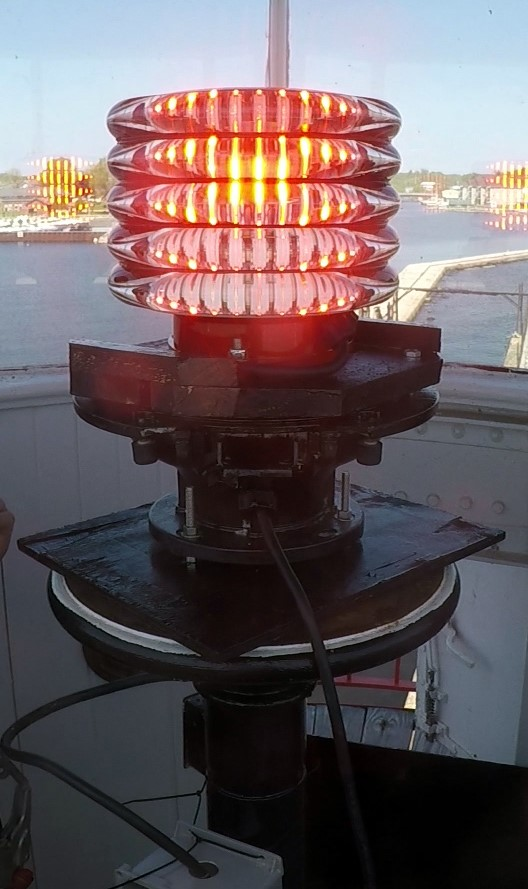
Current flashing LED light
