= Art Dettman Fishing Shanty =

- Dettman, Art, Fishing Shanty
- U.S. National Register of Historic Places
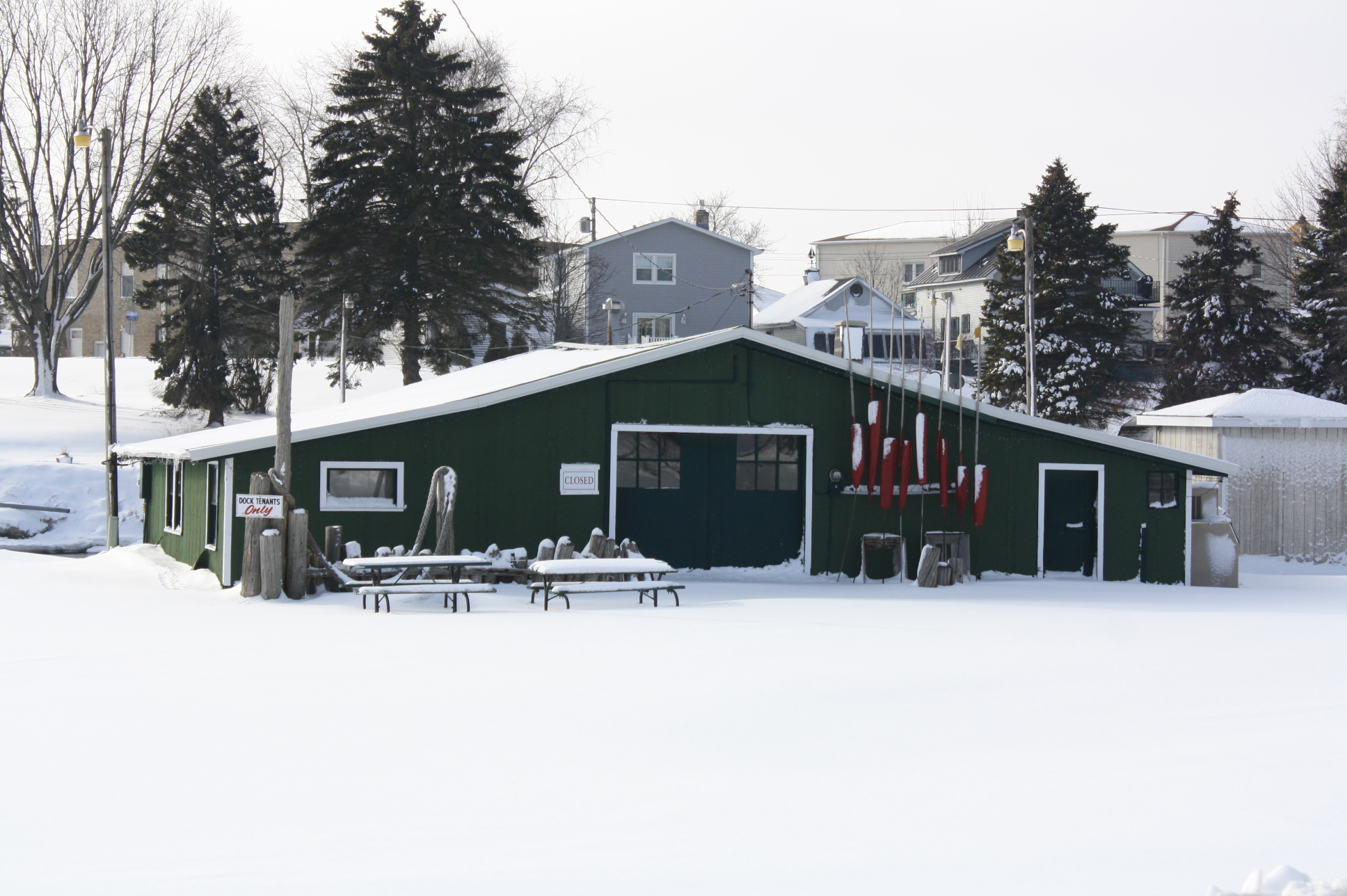
- Art Dettman Fishing Shanty
- Location: Church St. at the Ahnapee R., Algoma, Wisconsin
- Coordinates: 44°36′35″N 87°26′02″W
- Area: less than one acre
- Built: 1935
- Architectural style: Late 19th and Early 20th Century American Movements
- NRHP reference No.: 93001428
- Added to NRHP: December 10, 1993

The Art Dettman Fishing Shanty is located in Algoma, Wisconsin.

== History ==
Art Dettman served as Mayor of Algoma. He operated a fishing business out of the shanty and it continues to be used for commercial fishing. It was added to the State and the National Register of Historic Places in 1993.
