= Tug Ludington =

- MAJOR WILBUR FR. BROWDER (tugboat)
- U.S. National Register of Historic Places
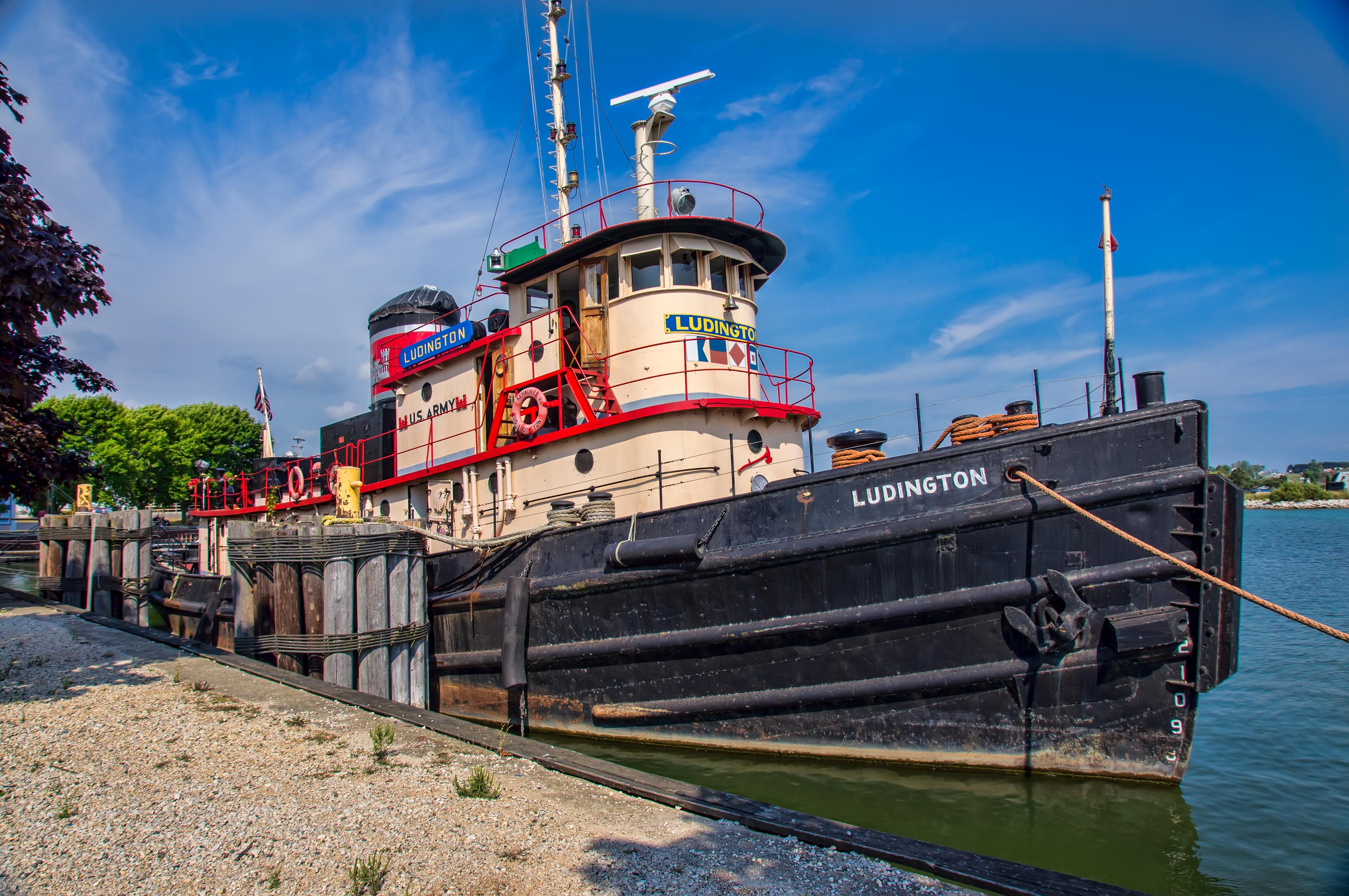
- Tug Ludington

- Location within Wisconsin Location within the United States
- Location: Harbor Park, Kilbourn St., Kewaunee, Wisconsin
- Coordinates: 44°27′36″N 87°30′6″W
- Area: less than one acre
- Built: 1943
- Built by: Jakobson Shipyard
- Architect: Cox and Stevens
- Architectural style: Weled Steel Tug
- NRHP reference No.: 02000284
- Added to NRHP: March 28, 2002

The Tug Ludington (formerly Major Wilbur Fr. Browder) is a World War II–era tugboat built in 1943 at Jakobson Shipyard in Oyster Bay, New York. The U.S. Army designated the tug LT-4. The tug's armament consisted of two 50 caliber machine guns and participated in the D-Day invasion of Normandy, towing ammunition barges across the English Channel. After World War II, it joined the U.S. Army Transportation Corps until 1947 when the Corps of Engineers transferred the tug to Kewaunee, Wisconsin and then renamed it the Tug Ludington. It was used in the construction and maintenance of many harbors on the Great Lakes and now rests in Harbor Park in Downtown, Kewaunee and is open to visitors for tours. As the Major Wilbur Fr. Browder, the tug is on the National Register of Historic Places listings in Kewaunee County, Wisconsin.

Although the U.S. Navy had more large ships than the U.S. Army in World War II, the Army had a larger number of total ships, almost twice as many as the Navy, including several thousand harbor craft. Classified as a large tug (LT), the Browder was able to sail to England under its own power. Several hundred LTs were built during World War II but only a few unmodified vessels exist today. A sister tug, the LT-5 Major Elisha K. Enson, now the Nash, is also listed on the National Register of Historic Places, with a similar history.

The Browder was originally painted navy gray, but as the Ludington is now painted as it was in its second life as a construction and maintenance ship, in the colors of the Corps of Engineers, primarily black, silver, and red. The tug is 115 feet in length, with a 26-foot beam and 14 foot 3 inch draft. The tug was fitted for a crew of 24 in World War II, and 14 when operated by the Corps.
