= Marquette Historic District =

Historic district in Wisconsin, United States

- U.S. National Register of Historic Places
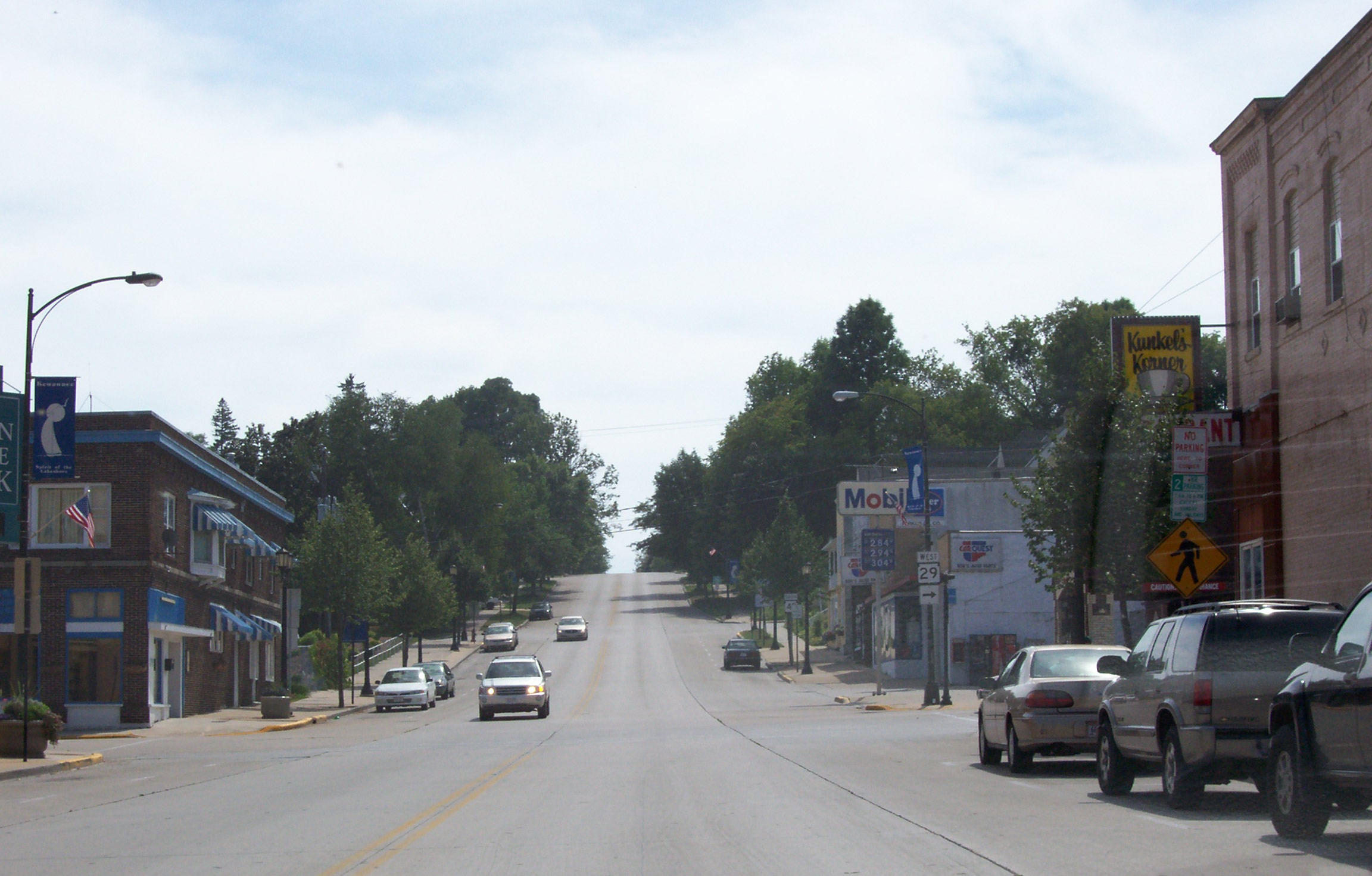
- A portion of the district.

- Location within Wisconsin Location within the United States
- Location: Roughly bounded by Lake Michigan and Center, Juneau and Lincoln Sts., Kewaunee, Wisconsin
- Coordinates: 44°27′11″N 87°30′13″W
- Area: 20 acres (8.1 ha)
- NRHP reference No.: 93001167
- Added to NRHP: November 4, 1993

The Marquette Historic District is located in Kewaunee, Wisconsin. It is largely made up of a residential neighborhood.
