= List of people from Appleton, Wisconsin =

The following notable people are from or have been associated with Appleton, Wisconsin.

== Artists and performers ==
- Judah Bauer, guitarist
- Willem Dafoe, actor
- Theodore Hardeen, magician
- Harry Houdini, illusionist and stunt performer
- Lynn Kellogg, singer
- Steven Krueger, actor
- Maury Laws, composer
- Jeff Loomis, guitarist
- Michael Patrick McGill, actor
- Roy Purdy, rapper
- Brenda Rae, operatic soprano
- Mark Stewart, musician
- Mary Ann Wells, dancer and ballet dance teacher
- Terry Zwigoff, filmmaker

== Athletes and sports personnel ==
- Esmir Bajraktarevic, soccer player
- Myrt Basing, NFL player
- Rocky Bleier, NFL player, four-time Super Bowl Champion
- Brian Butch, NBA player
- Mark Catlin Sr., football coach
- Clarence Currie, MLB player
- Chris DeMarco, basketball coach
- Matt Erickson, MLB, Manager Wisconsin Timber Rattlers
- Royal T. Farrand, physician and college football player
- Sarah Hagen, NWSL player
- J. P. Hayes, PGA golfer
- Joe Hietpas, baseball player
- George Hogreiver, MLB player
- Danny Jansen, MLB player
- Roger Jenkins, hockey player
- Erik Jensen, NFL player
- Swede Johnston, NFL player
- Ross Kenseth, America Stock car racing driver
- Cole Konrad, first-ever Bellator Heavyweight Champion
- Ron Kostelnik, football player
- Tony Kubek, World Series champion baseball player and Hall of Fame broadcaster
- Stu Locklin, baseball and educator
- Garrett Lowney, Olympic medalist
- Jack Mead, NFL player
- Chester J. Roberts, head coach of the Miami RedHawks football and men's basketball teams
- Paul Schommer, Olympic biathlete
- Don Werner, MLB player
- Silas Young, professional wrestler

== Authors and journalists ==
- Mary Agria, author
- Gary Arndt, travel photographer and writer
- Lan Samantha Chang, author and director of the Iowa Writers' Workshop
- Edna Ferber, author
- Alfred Galpin, correspondent of H. P. Lovecraft
- Henry Golde, author and Holocaust survivor
- William Norman Grigg, author
- Kristine Jarinovska, legal scientist, Secretary of State, Latvia
- Walter Havighurst, author
- Gladys Taber, author
- Greta Van Susteren, journalist, Newsmax television anchor

== Businesspeople ==
- William Beverly Murphy, ex-president of Campbell's
- Brad Smith, president and chief legal officer at Microsoft
- Travis VanderZanden, founder of Bird Rides
- Walter B. Wriston, banker

== Military personnel ==
- John Bradley, Iwo Jima Navy flag-raiser
- Zuhdi Jasser, doctor, former lieutenant commander in the United States Navy
- John S. Mills, U.S. Air Force major general
- Erik M. Ross, U.S. Navy rear admiral
- William J. Van Ryzin, U.S. Marine Corps lieutenant general

== Politicians ==
- George Baldwin, politician and businessman
- Clinton B. Ballard, Wisconsin state representative
- Mark Catlin Jr., speaker of the Wisconsin State Assembly
- William F. Cirkel, Wisconsin politician and businessman
- Bob Corbin, former member of the Ohio House of Representatives
- Lorenzo E. Darling, Wisconsin state representative
- Catherine Ebert-Gray, U.S. diplomat
- Harold Froehlich, U.S. representative and Outagamie County circuit judge
- Charles J. Hagen, Wisconsin state representative
- David Hammel, Wisconsin state representative
- Leopold Hammel, Wisconsin state representative
- William E. Hoehle, Wisconsin state representative
- Steve Kagen, U.S. congressman
- David M. Kelly, speaker of the Wisconsin State Assembly and Wisconsin state senator
- William Kennedy, Wisconsin state senator
- George Kreiss, Wisconsin politician
- August W. Laabs, Wisconsin state representative
- John F. Lappen, Wisconsin state senator
- James Lennon, Wisconsin state representative
- James E. Lyons, Wisconsin state representative
- Sue R. Magnuson, Wisconsin state representative
- David Martin, Wisconsin state representative
- Joseph McCarthy, U.S. senator
- C. E. McIntosh, Wisconsin state representative
- Talbot Peterson, Republican Party of Wisconsin chairman
- David Prosser Jr., Wisconsin Supreme Court Justice
- William J. Rogers, Wisconsin state representative
- Sue Rohan, Wisconsin state representative
- James Ryan, Wisconsin politician
- Samuel Ryan Jr., Wisconsin state representative
- Oscar J. Schmiege, Wisconsin state representative and jurist
- George J. Schneider, U.S. representative
- Charles M. Schrimpf, Wisconsin state representative
- David Schutter, criminal defense attorney
- Henry Clay Sloan, Wisconsin state representative
- Perry H. Smith, Wisconsin politician
- John Tracy, Wisconsin state representative
- William Smith Warner, Wisconsin state representative
- Alexander B. Whitman, Wisconsin state senator
- Jerry L. Wing, Wisconsin state representative
- Bernard C. Wolter, Wisconsin state representative

== Other ==
- Stephanie Chasteen, physics education researcher and science communicator
- Anthony Czarnik, chemist and inventor
- Emanuel Gerechter, rabbi and professor
- August Knuppel, mason and contractor
- Ann McKee, neuropathologist specializing in traumatic brain injuries
- John Benjamin Murphy, surgeon
- Larry Rosebaugh, Roman Catholic priest
- James Zwerg, civil rights activist
