= Gerardo Turcatti =

Swiss-Uruguayan chemical biologist and pharmacologist

Professor Gerardo Turcatti
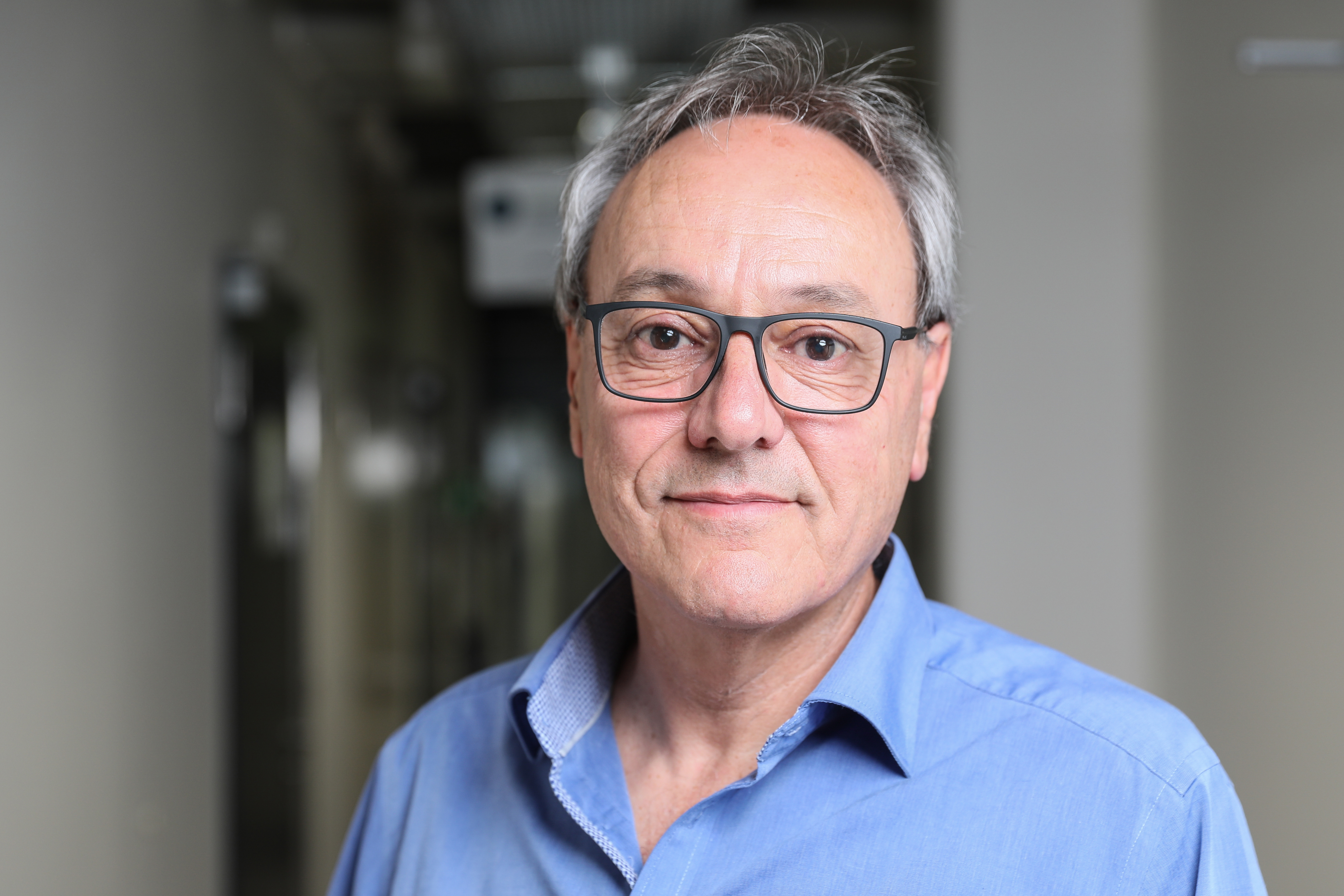
- Gerardo Turcatti in 2020
- Born: 1959 (age 66–67); Montevideo, Uruguay
- Known for: High-throughput screening
- Title: Adjunct Professor

Academic background
- Education: Chemistry, biochemistry
- Alma mater: University of the Republic (Uruguay); University of Geneva; EPFL
- Thesis: Novel fluorescence-based approaches to probe ligand recognition and structure of the tachykinin NK2 receptor (1995)
- Doctoral advisor: Horst Vogel

Academic work
- Discipline: Chemical biology
- Sub-discipline: Biochemistry, Pharmacology
- Institutions: EPFL (École Polytechnique Fédérale de Lausanne)
- Main interests: Drug discovery Chemical biology High-throughput screening High-content screening Fluorescent cellular probes Image analysis
- Website: https://www.epfl.ch/research/facilities/biomolecular-screening/

Gerardo Turcatti (born 1959 in Montevideo, Uruguay) is a Swiss-Uruguayan chemist who specialises in chemical biology and drug discovery. He is a professor at the École Polytechnique Fédérale de Lausanne (EPFL) and director of the Biomolecular Screening Facility at the School of Life Sciences there.

== Career ==
Turcatti studied chemistry at the University of the Republic in Uruguay. In 1981, he moved to Switzerland to earn a master's degree in chemical engineering from the University of Geneva. Discovering the world of life sciences while working at the biotech company Biogen during his studies, he pursued a career as a chemical biologist. While working at the Glaxo Biomedical Research Institute in Geneva, he studied under Professor Horst Vogel at EPFL for an industry PhD thesis in chemistry and biochemistry titled "Novel fluorescence-based approaches to probe ligand recognition and structure of the tachykinin NK2 receptor". His thesis earned him the EPFL Doctorate Award in 1996.

Until 1997 he was a research scientist at the Biochemistry Department of the Glaxo Wellcome Biomedical Research Institute, where he further adapted the methodologies he developed during his PhD to other G protein-coupled receptors (GPCR). In 1998 he went to work as a senior scientist at the Genomic Technologies Department of the Serono Pharmaceutical Research Institute.

As a spin-off of Serono, in January 2001, he co-founded Manteia Predictive Medicine and became executive technology director. The Swiss-based company invented and developed novel high throughput DNA sequencing technologies currently owned by Illumina.

In 2006, after a 20-year career in biotechnology and pharmaceutical companies, he founded the Biomolecular Screening Facility (BSF) at EPFL and has been its director since its inception. In 2020, Turcatti became adjunct professor at EPFL. In the framework of the NCCR research project on chemical biology, he is the project leader of the Swiss academic platform for chemical screens (ACCESS project).

== Research ==
Turcatti's industrial research has led to DNA sequencing technologies performing at higher throughput rates. He developed, amongst others, novel surface chemistries for DNA attachment; prior to in situ massively parallel amplification of DNA templates; a DNA sequencing method using chemically engineered fluorescent nucleotide transient terminators; and a fluorescent microscopy setup enabling high throughput low cost whole genome analysis. Some of these DNA-related technologies he co-developed have been implemented in commercial instruments produced by Illumina.

More recently, Turcatti's research interests have shifted towards bioactive probes and drug discovery. The current academic research of his laboratory focuses on innovative high throughput screening methods and technologies for efficient early drug discovery processes enabling more specific and safer molecules as therapeutic agents, this includes drug repurposing strategies for application in various therapeutic areas.

His research also targets the development of efficient methods for drug screening such as highly informative assays. By developing image-based high content screening methods to estimate efficacy, potency and early detection of off-target effects of potential drugs, they aim to contribute to the acceleration of the drug discovery process.

== Distinctions ==
Turcatti is a member of the scientific advisory board of ChemBioFrance, the scientific advisory board of Innopharma, and the European Cellular Assays Interest Group (EuCAI), and the editorial board of the journal Combinatorial Chemistry and High Throughput Screening.

== Selected works ==
- Brandenberg, Nathalie; Hoehnel, Sylke; Kuttler, Fabien; Homicsko, Krisztian; Ceroni, Camilla; Ringel, Till; Gjorevski, Nikolce; Schwank, Gerald; Coukos, George; Turcatti, Gerardo; Lutolf, Matthias P. (2020). "High-throughput automated organoid culture via stem-cell aggregation in microcavity arrays". Nature Biomedical Engineering. 4 (9): 863–874. doi:10.1038/s41551-020-0565-2. PMID 32514094. S2CID 219543643.
- Jaferzadeh, Keyvan; Rappaz, Benjamin; Kuttler, Fabien; Kim, Bo Kyoung; Moon, Inkyu; Marquet, Pierre; Turcatti, Gerardo (2020). "Marker-Free Automatic Quantification of Drug-Treated Cardiomyocytes with Digital Holographic Imaging". ACS Photonics. 7: 105–113. doi:10.1021/acsphotonics.9b01152. S2CID 212811883.
- Rappaz, Benjamin; Jourdain, Pascal; Banfi, Damiano; Kuttler, Fabien; Marquet, Pierre; Turcatti, Gerardo (2020). "Image-Based Marker-Free Screening of GABAA Agonists, Antagonists, and Modulators". SLAS Discovery. 25 (5): 458–470. doi:10.1177/2472555219887142. PMC 7243081. PMID 31779505.
- Haag, Simone M.; Gulen, Muhammet F.; Reymond, Luc; Gibelin, Antoine; Abrami, Laurence; Decout, Alexiane; Heymann, Michael; Van Der Goot, F. Gisou; Turcatti, Gerardo; Behrendt, Rayk; Ablasser, Andrea (2018). "Targeting STING with covalent small-molecule inhibitors". Nature. 559 (7713): 269–273. Bibcode:2018Natur.559..269H. doi:10.1038/s41586-018-0287-8. PMID 29973723. S2CID 49571499.
- Horvath, Peter; Aulner, Nathalie; Bickle, Marc; Davies, Anthony M.; Nery, Elaine Del; Ebner, Daniel; Montoya, Maria C.; Östling, Päivi; Pietiäinen, Vilja; Price, Leo S.; Shorte, Spencer L.; Turcatti, Gerardo; von Schantz, Carina; Carragher, Neil O. (2016). "Screening out irrelevant cell-based models of disease" (PDF). Nature Reviews Drug Discovery. 15 (11): 751–769. doi:10.1038/nrd.2016.175. PMID 27616293. S2CID 5799034.
- Bentley, David R.; Balasubramanian, Shankar; Swerdlow, Harold P.; Smith, Geoffrey P.; Milton, John; Brown, Clive G.; Hall, Kevin P.; Evers, Dirk J.; Barnes, Colin L.; Bignell, Helen R.; Boutell, Jonathan M. (November 2008). "Accurate whole human genome sequencing using reversible terminator chemistry". Nature. 456 (7218): 53–59. Bibcode:2008Natur.456...53B. doi:10.1038/nature07517. ISSN 0028-0836. PMC 2581791. PMID 18987734.
- Turcatti, Gerardo; Romieu, Anthony; Fedurco, Milan; Tairi, Ana-Paula (March 2008). "A new class of cleavable fluorescent nucleotides: synthesis and optimization as reversible terminators for DNA sequencing by synthesis †". Nucleic Acids Research. 36 (4): e25. doi:10.1093/nar/gkn021. ISSN 1362-4962. PMC 2275100. PMID 18263613.
