= Anthony Czarnik =

American biochemist and inventor (born 1957)

Anthony W. Czarnik
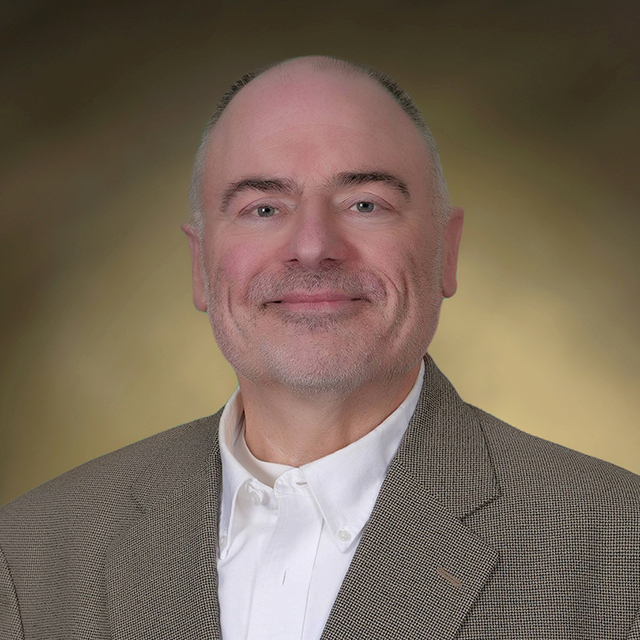
- Anthony Czarnik in June 2024
- Born: Anthony William Czarnik Jr. 1957 (age 68–69)
- Occupation: Chemist
- Scientific career
- Education: University of Wisconsin at Madison (BS, 1977); University of Illinois at Urbana–Champaign (MS, 1980; PhD, 1981); Columbia University (postdoctoral)
- Known for: Chemosensors, ACS Combinatorial Science, Illumina, Inc.
- Spouse: Rebecca Czarnik
- Fields: Chemistry
- Institutions: University of Nevada (2004–present)
- Thesis: Chemical studies on nucleic acid analogues (1981)
- Doctoral advisor: Nelson J. Leonard
- Other academic advisors: Edwin Vedejs, Ronald Breslow
- Website: www.unr.edu/chemistry/faculty/anthony-czarnik

Anthony William Czarnik (born 1957) is an American chemist and inventor. He is best known for pioneering studies in the field of fluorescent chemosensors and co-founding Illumina, Inc., a biotechnology company in San Diego. Czarnik was also the founding editor of ACS Combinatorial Science. He currently serves as an adjunct visiting professor at the University of Nevada, Reno.

== Education ==
Anthony Czarnik attended the University of Wisconsin and received his B.S. in Biochemistry in 1977. He then studied with Nelson J. Leonard at the University of Illinois at Urbana–Champaign and earned an M.S. in biochemistry in 1980 and a Ph.D. in chemistry in 1981 with a thesis, "Chemical studies on nucleic acid analogues." He then studied with Ronald Breslow at Columbia University (1981–1983) as an NIH Postdoctoral Fellow.

== Career ==
Czarnik joined the Chemistry Department at the Ohio State University as assistant professor in 1983. He later was promoted to associate professor. Czarnik worked at Ohio State University until 1993, when he was offered a position as Director of the Bio-Organic Chemistry group at Parke-Davis Research Laboratory in Ann Arbor, Michigan. Czarnik was the founding editor of ACS Combinatorial Science (formerly Journal of Combinatorial Chemistry), an academic journal published by the American Chemical Society.

In April 1998, Czarnik co-founded Illumina, Inc., a biotechnology company now traded on NASDAQ and specializing in sequencing, genotyping and gene expression, with David Walt, John Stuelpnagel, Larry Bock, and Mark Chee. Czarnik served as Illumina's chief scientific officer (CSO) until 2000. He was terminated from his position of CSO and later filed a wrongful termination lawsuit. The Court ruled in Czarnik's favor, but the company appealed. The appeal court sustained the lower court verdict but in 2005 reduced the punitive damage ordered by the jury. Czarnik later filed a patent law case in the United States District Court for the District of Delaware, alleging four counts against his former employer, including reputational harm for correction of named inventor under 35 U.S.C. § 256.

In 2001, Czarnik was recruited by Sensors for Medicine and Science, Inc., where he served as chief scientific officer. Since 2003, Czarnik has co-founded a number of biotechnology companies including Deuteria Pharmaceuticals LLC and Protia LLC.

Since 2016, annual Czarnik Awards are given for exceptional work in the area of chemosensors at the International Conference on Molecular Sensors and Molecular Logic Gates (MSMLG).

Czarnik is as an executive producer of Electric Heart: Don Ellis, a documentary about Don Ellis, an American jazz musician.

== Research ==
=== Combinatorial Chemistry ===
While at Parke-Davis Pharmaceutical Research, a division of Warner-Lambert Company, Czarnik directed research and reported the first use of automation for the synthesis of compound “libraries”—large, organized collections of compounds. He became founding editor of the American Chemical Society’s Journal of Combinatorial Chemistry and led research into the use of Rf ID tags for directed sorting for use in compound library synthesis.

=== Fluorescent Chemosensors for Ion and Molecule Recognition ===
The concept of the fluorescent chemosensors-molecular structures' ability to detect analytes was substantially developed in the book Fluorescent Chemosensors for Ion and Molecule Recognition edited by Czarnik and co-authored with other scientists. The book's study is mostly focused on the analysis of the fluorescent chemosensors' chemical structures and their applications and technical uses in different fields of science. Czarnik coined the term chemosensor to refer to synthetic compounds that bind and “signal” the presence of analytes in reversible manner. He authored a review article in 1994, which led to more research being done worldwide, including a review of the field 23 years later.

Eventually, chemosensors found applications in chemistry, biochemistry, immunology, physiology, medicine and in the military for landmine detection. The book laid foundation to other publications on chemosensors and gained recognition and critical attention of the scientific community with some of the scientists defining Czarnik's contributions "significant" and "pioneering in the field of fluorescent chemosensors" "with a positive consequence on the creative pursuit of libraries of new molecules for a range of analyte targets". There is also a conference called International Conference on Molecular Sensors and Molecular Logic Gates which is held twice a year and presents Czarnik awards to investors. In 2003, Czarnik gave an outline of a practical method for monitoring how chemosensors can be used to track glucose levels for diabetic patients. His work, as well as that of many others, led to the first implantable FDA-approved continuous glucose monitor.

=== Hexaazatriphenylene Hexanitrile and its Derivatives ===
Czarnik reported the first synthesis of Hexaazatriphenylene Hexanitrile, a hydrogen-free polyfunctional heterocycle with D3h symmetry, in 1986. Because of the properties of this compound, it has found application in the preparation of OLEDs for TV screens and is being investigated for use in improving lithium-ion batteries.

=== RNA-targeting small molecule drugs ===
In 1998, Dr. Czarnik’s group at Parke-Davis reported the first successful drug discovery effort in which RNA was the target. His group also conducted the first successful effort to discover small molecule drugs that work by binding to RNA. This has led to the creation of a new field of drug discovery, notably the focus of startup companies and scientific conferences.

=== DNA Sequencing Using Self-Assembled Microarrays ===
The DNA analyzers developed at Illumina, which was co-founded by Czarnik in 1998, use the patented technology of multiplex decoding of array sensors with microspheres to read genetic codes. As a result, the analyzers have reduced the cost of sequencing a human genome.

=== Improving Commercial Chemicals by Deuterium Enrichment ===
In 2009, Czarnik submitted 240 patent applications covering the use of deuterium-substitution in drug discovery.. He has also invented drugs such as (R)-d1-lenalidomide and (R)-d1-pioglitazone, for clinical studies.

== Selected publications ==
- Czarnik; A.W. Alcoholic compositions having a lowered risk of acetaldehydemia. U.S. Patent 9,044,423, June 2, 2015.
- Jacques, V.; Czarnik, A.W.; Judge, T.M.; Van der Ploeg, L.H.T.; DeWitt, S.H. “Differentiation of antiinflammatory and antitumorigenic properties of stabilized enantiomers of thalidomide analogs” PNAS 2015, 112, E1471-E1479
- Chee, M.S.; Stuelpnagel, J.R.; Czarnik, A.W. Method of making and decoding of array sensors with microspheres. U.S. Patent 7,060,431, June 13, 2006.
- Mei, H.-Y.; Cui, M.; Heldsinger, A.; Lemrow, S. M.; Loo, J. A.; Sannes-Lowery, K. A.; Sharmeen, L.; Czarnik, A. W. "Inhibitors of Protein-RNA Complexation That Target the RNA: Specific Recognition of HIV-1 TAR RNA by Small Organic Molecules", Biochemistry 1998, 37, 14204-14212
- Czarnik, A. W. “Guest Editorial on Combinatorial Chemistry”, Acc. Chem. Res., 1996, 29, 112
- Czarnik, A. W. “Desperately Seeking Sensors”, Chemistry & Biology 1995, 2, 423
- Czarnik, A. W. "Chemical Communication in Water Using Fluorescent Chemosensors", Accts. Chem. Res. 1994, 27, 302

== Books ==
- Integrated Drug Discovery Technologies. Mei, H.-Y., Czarnik, A.W., Eds.; Marcel Dekker: New York, NY, 2002.
- Optimization of Solid-Phase Combinatorial Synthesis. Yan, B., Czarnik, A.W., Eds.; Wiley: New York, NY, 2002.
- Solid-Phase Organic Syntheses. Volume 1. Czarnik, A.W., Ed.; Wiley: New York, NY, 2001.
- A Practical Guide to Combinatorial Chemistry. DeWitt, S.H., Czarnik, A.W., Eds.; ACS Books: Washington, DC, 1997.
- Combinatorial Chemistry: Synthesis and Application. Wilson, S.H., Czarnik, A.W., Eds.; Wiley & Sons: New York, NY, 1997.
- Chemosensors of Ion and Molecular Recognition. Desvergne, J.-P., Czarnik, A.W., Eds.; NATO ASI Series, Series C: Vol. 492; Kluwer Academic Press: Dordrecht, 1997.
- Fluorescent Chemosensors for Ion and Molecule Recognition. Czarnik, A.W., Ed.; Vol. 538, ACS Books: Washington, DC, 1993

== Awards and recognition ==
In 2024, Czarnik was elected to the National Academy of Inventors. He has also earned the Alfred P. Sloan Fellowship and the Dreyfus Teacher-Scholar Award in 1989. He is listed as an inventor on over 40 granted U.S. patents.

== Philanthropy ==
Czarnik is a founder of RenoCares, a charitable fund that supports convicted alcohol and drug addicts through financial aid for rehabilitation treatment, counseling and psychological services. The organization is managed by the Community Foundation of Western Nevada.

== See also ==
- Czarnik v. Illumina Inc.
- List of people from Appleton, Wisconsin
- List of Wikipedia people
