= 2007 Outagamie County Executive election =

- April 3, 2007

Nominee	Toby Paltzer	Chuck Schmidt
Party	Nonpartisan	Nonpartisan
Popular vote	14,042	6,905
Percentage	66.97%	32.93%
County Executive before election
Toby Paltzer
Nonpartisan
Elected County Executive
Toby Paltzer
Nonpartisan

The 2007 Outagamie County Executive election took place on April 3, 2007, to select the County Executive of Outagamie County, Wisconsin. Incumbent County Executive Toby Paltzer ran for re-election to a third term, despite a pledge after his 2003 re-election to not seek another term. He was challenged by County Board Supervisor Chuck Schmidt, who campaigned on a need to cut spending.

The Post-Crescent endorsed Paltzer for re-election, noting that while "there are areas in which he can improve his leadership," the county "has operated fairly smoothly" under his leadership, and "he's the better choice over challenger Chuck Schmidt[.]" It noted that while Schmidt argued that there was a need to cut spending, "it's a fairly common [point] for political candidates to make, and Schmidt can't point to any specific areas or departments in which the county can cut back, despite his time on the board."

Paltzer ultimately defeated Schmidt in a landslide, winning re-election with 67 percent of the vote.

== General election ==
=== Candidates ===
- Toby Paltzer, incumbent County Executive
- Chuck Schmidt, Board Supervisor

=== Results ===
2007 Outagamie County Executive election
Party	Candidate	Votes	%
Nonpartisan	Toby Paltzer (inc.)	14,042	66.97%
Nonpartisan	Chuck Schmidt	6,905	32.93%
Write-in		22	0.10%
Total votes		20,969	100.00%
