= Emilia Dauway =

American surgeon

- Born: 11 August 1965 (age 61)
- Known for: Co-inventor of the use of magnetic seeds in the breast to localise non-palpable breast cancers and the first in Australia to use magnetic seeds instead of radioactive seeds.
- Medical career
- Profession: Surgeon
- Field: General surgery; Breast surgery; Surgical oncology

Emilia Dauway (born 11 August 1965) is an American trained surgeon who is practicing general, breast and oncologic surgery in Australia. Dauway was co-inventor of the use of radioactive seeds in the breast to localise non-palpable breast cancers and the first in Australia to use magnetic seeds instead of radioactive seeds. This technique replaces hookwire or needle localisation improving patient safety, outcomes and satisfaction. The method was patented by the University of South Florida while Dauway was a fellow of surgical oncology. The method has been used since 1999 and has improved with the development of modern equipment. Dauway is also a Yoga Instructor, a Keynote speaker and is founder/director of Restore More, a non-profit initiative which provides education and funding to women in regional and geographically disadvantaged areas for breast cancer treatment and reconstruction.

== Education ==
Dauway graduated from Long Beach Polytechnic High School, Long Beach CA in 1983. She then studied for a Bachelor's degree, Natural Science from Johns Hopkins University, Baltimore MD, graduating in May 1987, and obtained a Doctorate of Medicine from the University of Illinois College of Medicine, Rockford IL in 1992. Dauway then completed an Internship/Residency in General Surgery at Ochsner Medical Foundation Hospital, New Orleans LA, from June 1992 to May 1997. She completed a Fellowship in Surgical Oncology from University of South Florida, H.L. Moffitt Cancer and Research Institute Tampa FL, from June 1997 to May 1999.

== Career ==
Dauway has been employed in medical academic appointments and medical clinical appointments. She was employed as an assistant professor of surgery from June 1999 to April 2001, at the West Virginia University Robert C Byrd School of Medicine, Dept. of General Surgery Division of Surgical Oncology, Morgantown, West Virginia, USA. In 1999, Dr Dauway and Dr Charles Cox presented the results of a pilot study to the Clinical Congress of the American College of Surgeons. Results from that study indicated that the surgeons had discovered a safe new method of taking biopsies from lesions in the breast. The use of radioactive seeds allowed surgeons to more accurately locate tumors, allowing less tissue to be removed.

From April 2001 to December 2005 Dauway worked as a General Surgeon/Surgical Oncologist at the Virginia Mason Medical Center, Seattle, Washington, USA, in the Dept. of General, Thoracic, Vascular Surgery. Then she took the position of Chief of Surgery/Surgical Oncologist at Wilcox Memorial Hospital, Kauai, Hawaii, USA, from December 2005 to July 2012. From June 2007 to June 2012 she was assistant professor of surgery at Texas A & M Health Sciences Division of Surgical Oncology, Temple, Texas, USA and Clinical Instructor of Surgery at John Burns Medical School, Hawaii, USA, from June 2012 to Dec 2014. Her last appointment in the US, was Chief of Breast Surgery at Scott and White Healthcare, Texas, USA, from July 2012 to December 2014.

In 2014, IntraMedical Imaging LLC, licensed a key patent from the University of South Florida for the new breast cancer treatment co-invented by Dauway and Dr. Charles Cox, McCann Foundation Endowed Professor of Breast Surgery. The seed localization technique had been further refined and allowed surgeons to be guided by mammography, to place small radioactive seeds inside the patient's breast lump. The seeds are tracked to guide the surgeon to the lump, which minimizes the volume of breast tissue removed, resulting in a less invasive surgical option for patients, and better outcomes. This means that surgeons can locate and excise smaller tumours in the breast without the need for a mastectomy.

In January 2015, Dauway moved to Australia and was employed as a Specialist General Surgeon/Surgical Oncologist/Consultant at the Gladstone Mater Hospital and the Gladstone District Hospital, in Gladstone, Queensland, with her time divided equally between the two hospitals. The partnership between the two hospitals allowed each hospital more opportunities to employ specialists and provided better after-hours coverage. From October 2015 to 2018 Dauway was also employed in the academic position of Senior Lecturer at the University of Queensland School of Medicine, in the Faculty of Medicine and Biomedical Sciences, Brisbane, Qld, Australia. Dauway continued to make advances in oncoplastic surgery. She was the first surgeon in Australia to offer Magseed localization for breast cancer surgery, using small magnetic seeds, the size of a grain of rice, instead of radioactive seeds or the more traditional use of hook-wires. This seed can stay in place for up to 30 days winch allows more flexibility in timing. With the increased risk of infection with hook-wire technique, women from rural areas often had to travel to have this implanted and it needed to be done on the same day as the breast surgery. The first Magseed localisation was done on a breast-cancer patient from Middlemount, Queensland. Dauway left Gladstone in January 2020, to take up a position as Specialist General Surgeon/Surgical Oncologist/Consultant at the Hervey Bay Hospital & St. Stephens Private Hospital, Queensland.

== Philanthropy and community involvement ==
=== Restore More ===
Dauway founded Restore More, a non-profit organisation, to provide education and funding to women in regional and geographically disadvantaged areas, to allow better access to breast cancer treatment and reconstruction. After working in Central Queensland, Dauway noticed that rural and remote patients had barriers preventing them from accessing the full range of reconstruction options open to those living in cities. Reconstruction is not just cosmetic as those who have had one breast removed can suffer from muscular-skeletal problems and issues with balance. Reconstructive surgery can reduce issues caused by asymmetry and this is a vital part of treatment and recovery. Long distances and the expense of travel and accommodation can reduce reconstruction options for some patients. Only one in ten Australian women will be offered reconstructive surgery and Dauway aims to increase awareness of options and improve access. Fundraising events help provide funds for Restore More to continue this work.

=== The holistic approach ===
Dauway believes that treatment of cancer requires a holistic approach. In her practice, as well as removing the cancer, she aims for the person to be restored mentally and physically in order to live a quality life after treatment. She is a certified Yoga instructor and incorporates Yoga, diet and mindfulness techniques into surgical practice. She regularly taught at Epic Yoga and Lifestyle, in Gladstone, Queensland. Dauway believes that all patients should have access to reconstruction options.

=== Surgical volunteerism ===
When possible, Dr Dauway spends a few weeks each year working with surgical missions in various countries (listed below). The missions provide her with opportunities for teaching and learning.

- Restore More- Nepal, Dhulikhel Hospital, 2019
- IMA Helps- Paraguay, General Surgery, 2017- 2019
- IMA Helps– Nicaragua, General Surgery, 2016
- IMA Helps –El Salvador, General Surgery, July 2014
- FLMMC Cameroon, Medicine & development of a new medical facility, January 2014
- IMA Helps– Peru General, Surgery, July 2013
- IMA Helps– Nicaragua, General Surgery, July 2012
- Haiti, General Surgery, July 2010

== Professional memberships ==
- Fellow Royal Australian College of Surgeons
- Fellow American College of Surgeons
- Fellow Society of Surgical Oncology
- American Society of Breast Surgeons
- Breast Surgeons Australia New Zealand
- Association of Women Surgeons

== Awards and recognition ==
In 2019, at the Regional Women's Network, CQ Inc (RWN), Dauway won the Inspirational Woman of the Year 2019 award and was the first to receive the Ann Augusteyn Trophy. She was honored for a holistic approach to surgery and her work with regional women through her non-profit, Restore More.

== Patent ==
Dauway was the co-inventor of the use of radioactive seeds in the breast to localise non-palpable breast cancers and the first in Australia to use magnetic seeds instead of radioactive seeds. This technique replaces hook-wire or needle localisation improving patient safety, outcomes and satisfaction. The method was patented by the University of South Florida while Dauway was a fellow of surgical oncology. The method has been used since 1999 and has improved with the development of modern equipment.

Radio guided seed localization of imaged lesions
US Patent- US6496717B2
Inventor: Charles E. Cox, Emilia L. Dauway
Assignee: University of South Florida

== Research ==
Sample of research:

- Dauway, E.L., Giuliano, R., Pendas, S., Haddad, F., Costello, D., Cox, C.E., Berman, C., Ku, N.N. and Reintgen, D.S. (1999). Lymphatic mapping: a technique providing accurate staging for breast cancer. Breast Cancer, 6(2), pp. 145–154.
- Gray, R.J., Giuliano, R., Dauway, E.L., Cox, C.E. and Reintgen, D.S. (2001). Radioguidance for nonpalpable primary lesions and sentinel lymph node(s). The American Journal of Surgery, 182(4), pp. 404–406.
- Gray, R.J., Salud, C., Nguyen, K., Dauway, E., Friedland, J., Berman, C., Peltz, E., Whitehead, G. and Cox, C.E. (2001). Randomized Prospective Evaluation of a Novel Technique for Biopsy or Lumpectomy of Nonpalpable Breast Lesions: Radioactive Seed Versus Wire Localization. Annals of Surgical Oncology, 8(9), pp. 711–715.
- Povoski, S.P., Dauway, E.L. and Ducatman, B.S. (2002). Sentinel lymph node mapping and biopsy for breast cancer at a rural-based university medical center: Initial Experience with intraparenchymal and intradermal injection routes. Breast Cancer, 9(2), pp. 134–144.
- Goodwin, J.T., Decroff, C., Dauway, E., Sybenga, A. and Mahabir, R.C. (2013). The management of incidental findings of reduction mammoplasty specimens. The Canadian journal of plastic surgery = Journal canadien de chirurgie plastique, 21(4), pp. 226–8.
- Gray, R.J., Cox, C.E. and Dauway, E.L. (2016). Radioguided Surgery for Non-palpable Breast Lesions: I-125 Radioactive Seed Localization. Radioguided Surgery, pp. 125–137.
- Dauway, E.L. (2018). The state of breast reconstruction in Australia: challenges and opportunities. Mastology, 23(4), pp. 203–205.
