= Molten Ventures =

British venture capital firm

- Company type: Public
- Traded as: LSE: GROW; Euronext: GRW.IE
- Industry: Venture capital
- Founded: 2006; 20 years ago (Esprit Capital)
- Founders: Simon Cook (CEO); Stuart Chapman
- Headquarters: London, England, UK
- Area served: Europe
- Key people: Laurence Hollingworth (chairman); Ben Wilkinson (CEO); Andrew Zimmermann (CFO)
- Services: Venture Capital
- Revenue: ▲£159.3 million (2026)
- Operating income: ▲£131.7 million (2026)
- Net income: ▲£120.3 million (2026)
- Website: www.moltenventures.com

Molten Ventures, formerly Draper Esprit, is a British venture capital firm, investing in high growth technology companies with global ambitions. The firm has offices in London, Cambridge and Dublin. It is listed on the London Stock Exchange and is a constituent of the FTSE 250 Index.

== History ==
Founded in 2006 as Esprit Capital, the company was renamed Draper Esprit in 2015 after joining Silicon Valley investor Tim Draper and the Draper Venture Network.

In June 2016, Draper Esprit was the subject of an initial public offering on the London Stock Exchange.

In June 2018, the Brunei Investment Agency acquired a stake in Draper Esprit for £20 million.

The company moved to the main market in July 2021 becoming the largest technology-related venture capital company to be publicly listed.

In November 2021, Draper Esprit rebranded to Molten Ventures.

In April 2022, Molten Ventures joined The Venture Capital Trust Association (VCTA). In November 2023, Molten Ventures acquired Forward Partners for £41.4 million.

== Investments ==
Investments have included companies such as Crowdcube, Endomag, Freetrade, Graphcore, Revolut and Trustpilot.
