= David R. Walt =

American scientist and academic

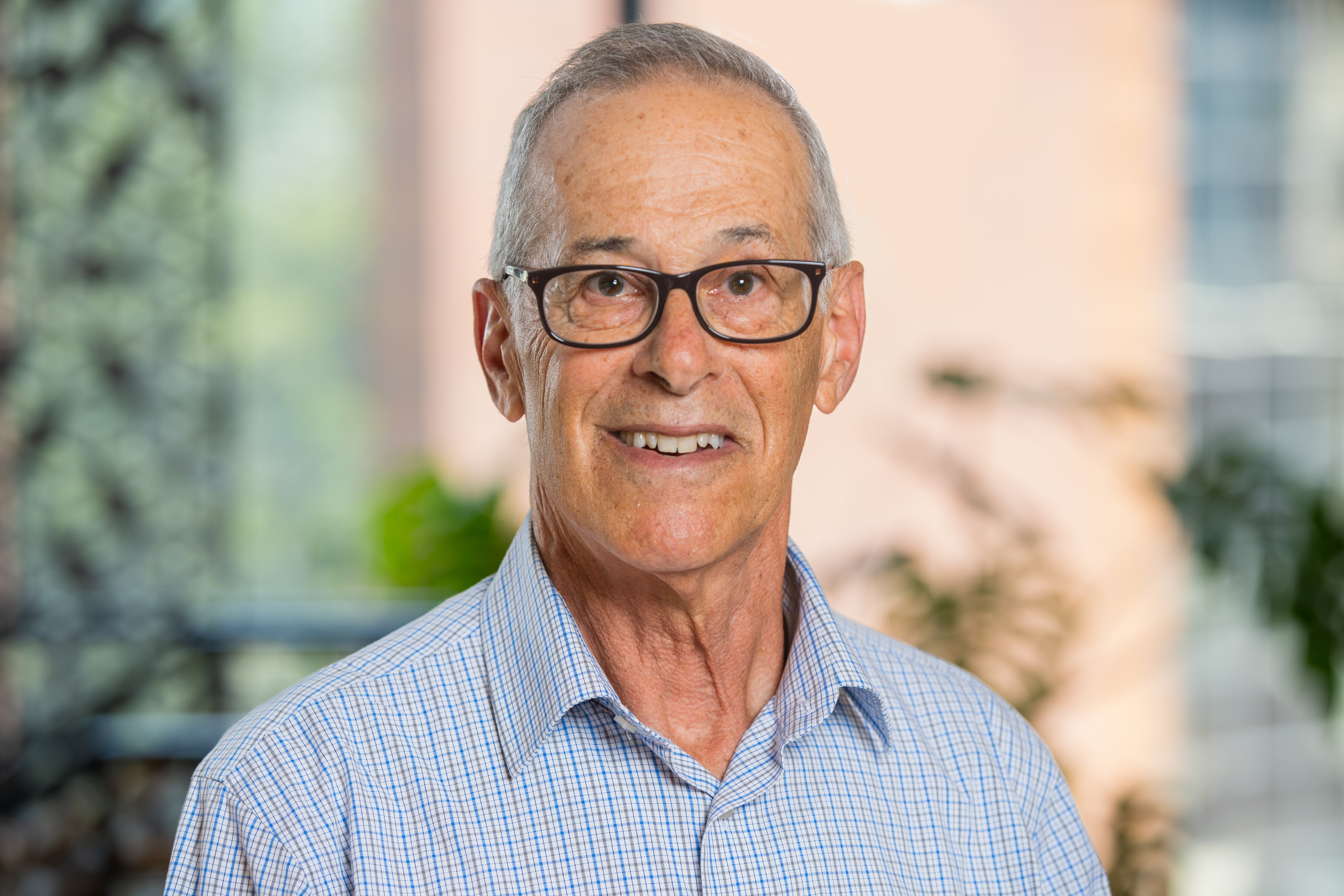
David R. Walt

David R. Walt is an American scientist, educator and entrepreneur. Walt is the Hansjörg Wyss Professor of Bioinspired Engineering at Harvard Medical School and professor of pathology at Harvard Medical School and Brigham and Women's Hospital. He is a Core Faculty Member of the Wyss Institute at Harvard University, Associate Member at the Broad Institute of Harvard and MIT and is a Howard Hughes Medical Institute professor. Trained as a chemist, Walt started his academic career in 1981 and spent 35 years in the Chemistry Department at Tufts University where he rose through the ranks to become both Department Chair and the Robinson Professor of Chemistry. In 2014, he was appointed university professor. In 2017 Walt moved to Harvard University. Walt was co-director of the Mass General Brigham Center for COVID Innovation.

== Early life and education ==
Walt was born in Detroit, in 1953. He received his B.S. degree from the University of Michigan in 1974 and his PhD in Chemical Biology from Stony Brook University in 1979. He was a postdoctoral research fellow at Massachusetts Institute of Technology where he worked with George M. Whitesides on enzyme-catalyzed organic synthesis.

== Research ==
Walt's research initially was focused on developing fiber optic sensors and biosensors. His laboratory worked on the use of polymerization chemistry to bind sensory molecules to the surface of optical fibers, enabling a new era in optical sensor technology. His laboratory made contributions that led to new sensing chemistries and multiple applications of sensors to clinical, environmental and process control.

In 1991, Walt published a paper describing the use of imaging fibers for sensing, supporting the concept that an optical imaging fiber could be modified with different chemistries to enable multianalyte sensing in a unitary sensor format. Over the next several years, Walt and colleagues demonstrated multianalyte sensing using this approach, culminating in a DNA microarray based on optical fibers. The random bead array technology was licensed to a venture-backed startup, Illumina, Inc., in 1998 to develop next-generation genotyping and sequencing instrumentation.

The Walt laboratory also focused its microwell arrays on systems that can detect and measure single molecules. Walt and co-workers showed that individual, stochastic enzyme substrate turnover rates for hundreds to thousands of single enzyme molecules can be monitored simultaneously using this array format. This effort helped pave the road to multiple biochemistry discoveries by observing individual molecules instead of population averages. The single molecule work also resulted in a novel method for detecting nucleic acids and proteins using digital analysis. The technology is the most sensitive protein detection technology in the world, called Simoa, with better than a thousandfold improvement in sensitivity over today's clinical methods. It is used on both research applications and clinical applications for neurodegenerative diseases.

Since moving to Brigham and Woman's Hospital, Harvard Medical School and the Wyss Institute at Harvard University, Walt's laboratory has been focused on developing and applying new biomarker assay technologies to unmet clinical needs including early detection of breast cancer, detection of active tuberculosis and other infectious diseases, diagnosis of neurodegenerative diseases, prediction of immunotherapy response for cancer, and the early diagnostics of depression and Alzheimer's disease, work that has been featured in the Harvard University Gazette. The laboratory has also been active in developing ultrasensitive assays for SARS-CoV-2 antigens, vaccines, host antibodies, neutralization assays, and have applied these assays to a multitude of clinical studies to understand disease pathogenesis and help advise clinical care. Walt's lab is also pursuing research on single enzyme molecules to provide insight into enzyme mechanisms. His work has been featured in numerous independent publications. His work in the field of diagnostics and biosensors has been fundamental in establishing valuable collaborations with the Michael J Fox Foundation, the Wellcome Leap foundation, Canon Medical Services, and the Chan Zuckerberg Initiative.

Walt's contributions to the field of diagnostics resulted in numerous peer-reviewed manuscripts and patents. Walt has been honored and elected into both the National Academy of Engineering and the National Academy of Medicine. He is a Member of the American Philosophical Society, a Fellow of the American Academy of Arts and Sciences, a Fellow of the American Institute for Medical and Biological Engineering, a Fellow of the American Association for the Advancement of Science, a Fellow of the National Academy of Inventors, and is inducted in the US National Inventors Hall of Fame. His contributions have been cited over 40,000 times. In addition, Walt's work on long COVID has been featured on National Public Radio, The Boston Globe, and the Harvard Gazette. In January 2025, Walt was honored as recipient of the National Medal of Technology and Innovation (NMTI) at the White House.

Walt is the scientific founder of Illumina Inc., Quanterix Corp., and has co-founded multiple other life sciences startups including Ultivue, Inc., Arbor Biotechnologies, Sherlock Biosciences, Vizgen, Inc., and Protillion Biosciences. Sherlock Biosciences was featured in Forbes

== Awards and honors ==
- 2025 - National Medal of Technology and Innovation.
- 2022 - Fritz J. and Dolores H. Russ Prize From the national Academy of Engineering
- 2021 - Kabiller Prize in Nanoscience and Nanomedicine
- 2019 - Wallace A. Coulter Lectureship Award—AACC
- 2019 - National Inventors Hall of Fame, Inductee
- 2018 - Honorary Doctor of Science, University of Michigan
- 2017 - American Chemical Society Kathryn C. Hach Award for Entrepreneurial Success
- 2016 - Ralph N. Adams Award in Bioanalytical Chemistry
- 2014 - Honorary Doctor of Science, Stony Brook University
- 2014 - American Chemical Society Gustavus John Esselen Award
- 2013 - American Chemical Society Division of Analytical Chemistry Spectrochemical Analysis Award
- 2013 - Pittsburgh Analytical Chemistry Award
- 2010 - University of Michigan Distinguished Innovator Lecture
- 2010 - Stony Brook University Distinguished Alumni Award
- 2010 - ACS National Award for Creative Invention
- 2006 - Alexander Cruickshank Lecturer, University of Rhode Island
- 2004 - Willard Lecturer, University of Michigan, Department of Chemistry
- 2004 - Francis Clifford Phillips Lectures, University of Pittsburgh, Department of Chemistry
- 2004 - Herman Bloch Award, University of Chicago, Department of Chemistry
- 2002 - Clifford C. Hach Lecturer, University of Wyoming College of Arts and Sciences, Department of Chemistry
- 2002 - Samuel R. Scholes Lecturer, Alfred University, School of Ceramic Engineering and Materials Science
- 1999 - Professor Invitee', Ecole Normale Superieure
- 1996 - Biosensors and Bioelectronics Award
- 1995 - National Science Foundation Special Creativity Award
- 1989 - 3M Research Creativity Award
