= Nanosys =

Nanosys Inc.
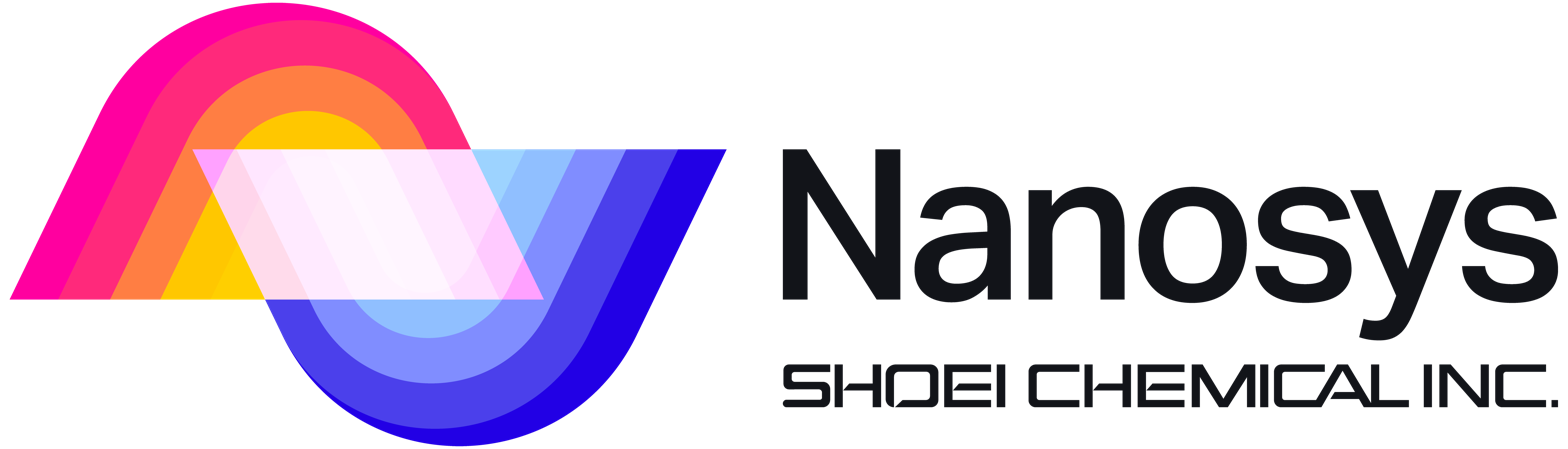
- Type: Private
- Industry: Nanotechnology; Advanced Materials; Consumer electronics Displays; Quantum dots
- Founded: 2001
- Founder: Larry Bock
- Headquarters: Nanosys; 233 S. Hillview Dr; Milpitas, California, U.S.
- Area served: Worldwide
- Key people: Yuji Akimoto (President and CEO) Dr. Hirokazu Sasaki (GM) Dr. Martin Devenney (COO)
- Products: Products list: QDEF (Quantum Dot Enhancement Film); QuantumRail
- Number of employees: 50
- Website: www.nanosys-shoei.com

Nanosys is a nanotechnology company located in Milpitas, California and founded in 2001. The company develops and manufactures quantum dot materials for display products.

== History ==
On July 28, 2021, Bloomberg reported that Nanosys was in talks to go public via GigInternational1 SPAC. A transaction is set to value the combined entity at about $1 billion.

In May 2023, Dr. Martin Devenney was named chief executive officer. Devenney was the former chief operating officer.

In September 2023, Nanosys was acquired by Shoei Chemical, Inc.

== Products ==
=== Quantum Dot Enhancement Film (QDEF) ===
Nanosys Quantum Dot Enhancement Film, or QDEF, is an optical film component for LED driven LCDs. Each sheet of QDEF contains trillions of tiny Quantum Dot Phosphors. QDEF enables LED-backlit LCDs to be brighter and more colorful by providing a high quality, tri-color white light from a standard blue LED light source. Larger than a water molecule, but smaller than a virus, these tiny phosphors convert blue light from a standard Gallium Nitride (GaN) LED into different wavelengths based upon their size. Larger dots emit longer wavelengths (red), while smaller dots emit shorter wavelengths (green). Blending together a mix of dot colors allows Nanosys to precisely engineer a new spectrum of light to customer specifications.

The Quantum Dots are tuned to create better color by changing their size during fabrication to emit light at just the right wavelengths. Traditional light emitting materials such as crystal phosphors have a broad fixed spectrum. Quantum dots can convert light to nearly any color in the visible spectrum, giving display designers the ability to tune and match the spectrum more accurately to color filters while improving energy efficiency.

QDEF was announced on May 17, 2011 at the Society for Information Display (SID) Display Week tradeshow. It has been adopted in products such as the Amazon Kindle Fire HDX 7 (2013) and the ASUS Zenbook NX-500 (2014).

At the Consumer Electronics Show 2015 it became known that Nanosys has licensed Samsung Electronics as well as 3M to manufacture QDEF products. QDEFs from 3M are used by top US TV brand Vizio (M-Series Quantum, P-Series Quantum & P-Series Quantum X) as well as TV manufacturers Hisense (ULED TV) and TCL (QLED TV) TV sets.

In 2020, Nanosys announced a supply agreement with Shoei Chemical, a Japan-based producer of nanoparticles, under which the latter became the sole manufacturing partner of QD materials.

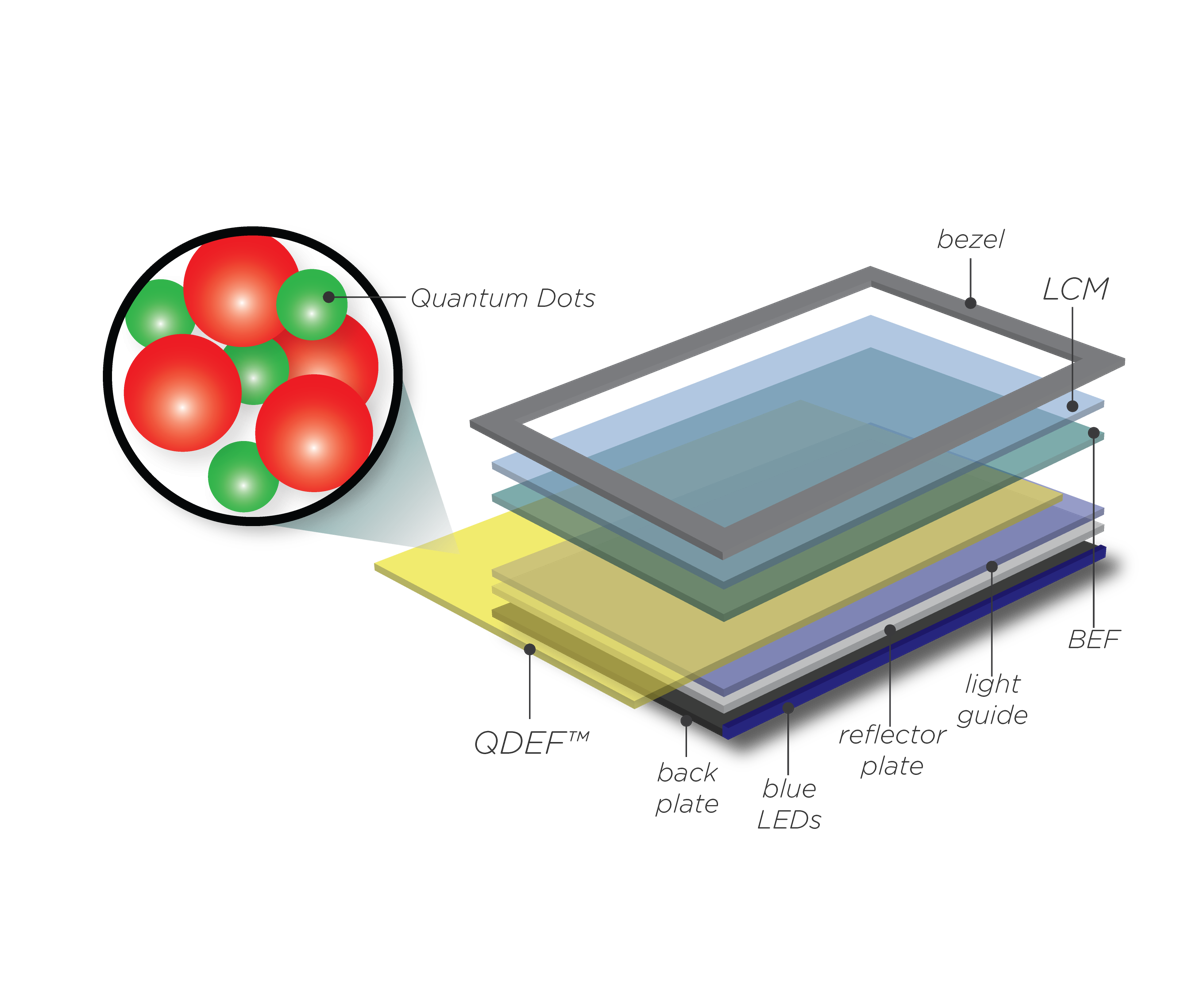
Fig 1: Exploded diagram showing QDEF integration into a standard LCD

=== QuantumRail ===
Announced just after CES in January 2010 as part of a commercial agreement with Korean consumer electronics manufacturer and LG subsidiary LG Innotek, the quantum rail is a glass capillary optical component containing red and green quantum dots that is inserted between the LEDs and the lightguide panel (LGP) of an LED LCD in manufacturing to improve color gamut.

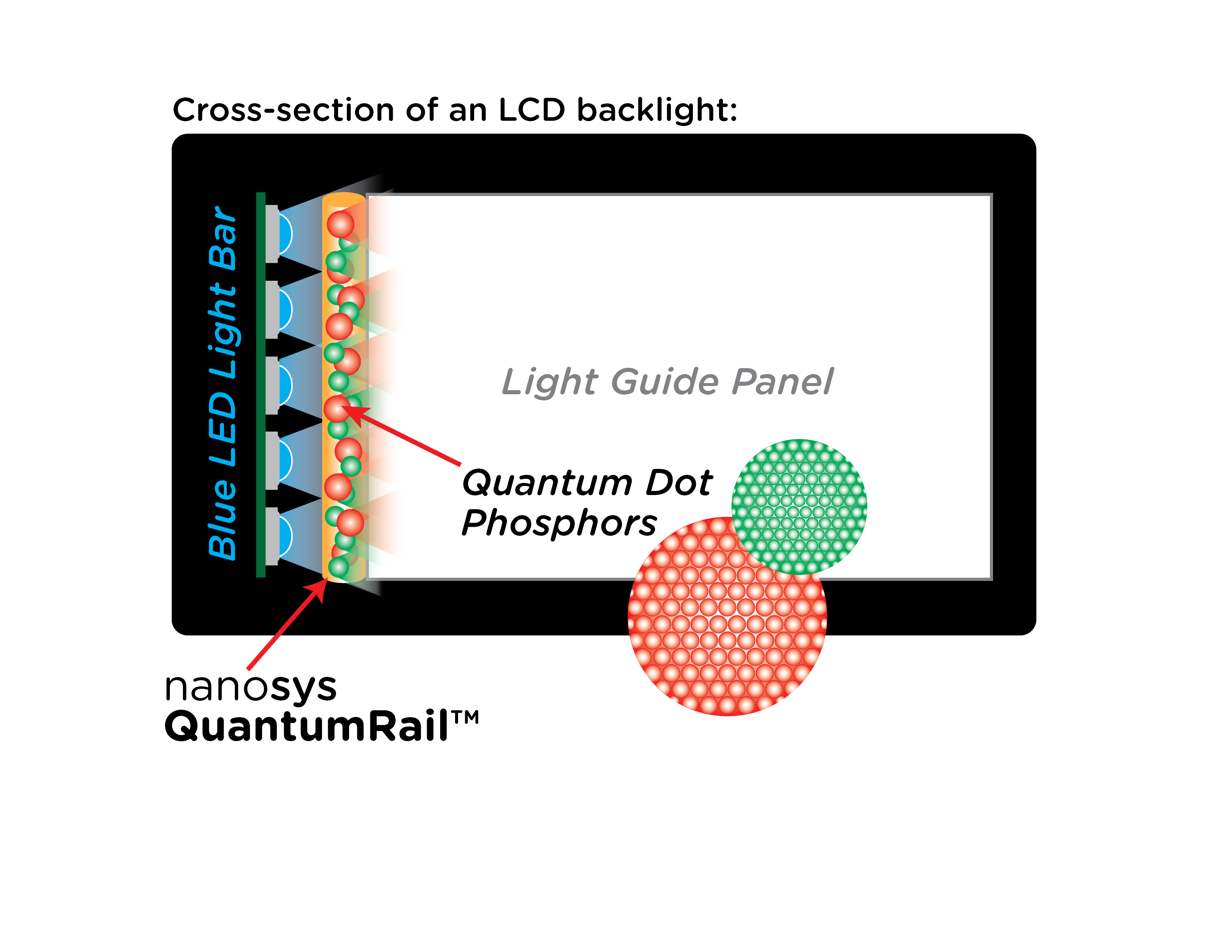
Fig 2: QuantumRail LED LCD implementation diagram

== Awards ==
- Society for Information Display DisplayWeek People's Choice Award 2019: Best Large Booth
- Society for Information Display Display Component of the Year Award 2017: Hyperion Quantum Dots
- Society for Information Display Best in Show 2015: Small booth category, Cadmium-Free Quantum Dot Enhancement Film (QDEF) comparison demo
- Society for Information Display Best in Show 2014: Small booth category, Quantum Dot Enhancement Film (QDEF) High Dynamic Range, wide color gamut demo with Dolby
- Society for Information Display Gold Component of the Year Award 2012: Quantum Dot Enhancement Film (QDEF)
- Society for Information Display Best in Show 2011: Small booth category
- Best of CES: 2011 Enabling Technology Award
- Silicon Valley Business Journal Emerging Technology Awards: Winner, life sciences
- Wall Street Journal 2010 Technology Innovation Awards: Runner up, semiconductors

== Founders, funding, and patents ==
Nanosys was founded by Larry Bock, Charles Lieber and Paul Alivisatos. They were subsequently joined by Steve Empedocles, Wally Parce and Calvin Chow.

Major funders of the company include Venrock Associates, Samsung, BOE Technology, LG Display, ARCH Venture Partners, Intel, El Dorado Ventures, Polaris Venture Partners, Prospect Ventures, Harris & Harris Group, Lux Capital, Applied Materials and Wasatch Advisors.

Nanosys has developed a significant quantum dot patent portfolio with over 650 issued and pending patents worldwide. These patents cover the fundamentals of quantum dot construction as well as component and manufacturing designs. This portfolio is the result of collaborations between Nanosys and universities such as Massachusetts Institute of Technology (MIT), Lawrence Berkeley National Laboratory and Hebrew University, as well as industry collaborations with companies including Philips-Lumileds and Life Technologies.

Nanosys also led the development of nanowire technology for solar cell, fuel cell, and lithium-ion battery applications, which it spun out in 2013 to a company now known as OneD Battery Sciences.
