= August Knuppel =

32nd Mayor of Appleton, Wisconsin

32nd Mayor of Appleton, Wisconsin
- In office February 1914 – April 1917
- Preceded by: James V. Canavan
- Succeeded by: John Faville

Personal details
- Born: October 4, 1857 Westphalia, Prussia
- Died: August 27, 1929 (aged 71) Appleton, Wisconsin, U.S.
- Resting place: Riverside Cemetery, Appleton, Wisconsin
- Spouse: Adeline Machmueller (m. 1881; died 1926)
- Children: Eugenia (Wettengel)^{(b. 1883; died 1948)}; Arnold E. Knuppel^{(b. 1885; died 1944)}; Amanda (Green)^{(b. 1887; died 1924)}
- Profession: mason, contractor

August A. Knuppel (October 4, 1857 – August 27, 1929) was a German American immigrant, mason, and contractor. He was the 32nd mayor of Appleton, Wisconsin, and was important in the development of the city.

== Biography ==
Knuppel was born in 1857 in the Province of Westphalia, which was then under the rule of the Kingdom of Prussia. He was raised and educated there; he took a course in architecture at Höxter and learned the building trade. He emigrated to the United States as a young man in 1879. After briefly residing in Philadelphia and Milwaukee, he settled in Appleton, in Outagamie County, Wisconsin, in 1881.

Shortly after arriving in Appleton, he began a contracting business and was hired to construct a number of buildings in the city. His success in contracting led him to other business ventures, in 1900 he organized the Appleton Lumber & Fuel Company, and in 1904 he started the Fox River Marble, Granite and Cut Stone Works. He continued as President of the Stone Works until his death, and with that company was responsible for much of the paving of Appleton's streets.

Structures built by Knuppel include the Congregational Church (now Trinity Lutheran Church), the Lincoln School, the Lincoln Mill of the Fox River Paper Company (now the Historic Fox River Mills which is on the National Register of Historic Places), the Walter brewery, and numerous hotels and banks.

Knuppel was also involved in local politics. He made his first run for mayor in 1911, falling just two votes short of James V. Canavan. Mayor Canavan ultimately died in office in December 1913, and Knuppel won a special election to fill out the remainder of his term. He did not run for another term, and ultimately served until 1917.

Knuppel died at his home in Appleton in 1929, after a year-long illness.

== Personal life and family ==
Knuppel's parents, Henry and Josephine, remained in Germany. August Knuppel married Adeline Machmueller of Mayville, Wisconsin, in 1881. They had three children together, though only two were still living at the time of Knuppel's death. They had at least five grandchildren.

Political offices
Preceded by James V. Canavan	Mayor of Appleton, Wisconsin; February 1914 – April 1917	Succeeded by John Faville
