= Illumina, Inc. =

American biotechnology company

Coordinates: 32.8875924°N 117.1730577°W

- Type: Public
- Traded as: Nasdaq: ILMN; S&P 500 component
- Industry: Biotechnology
- Founded: 1998; 28 years ago
- Founders: David Walt; Larry Bock; John Stuelpnagel; Anthony Czarnik; Mark Chee
- Headquarters: San Diego, California, U.S.
- Key people: Jacob Thaysen (CEO); Stephen P. MacMillan (Chairman)
- Products: NovaSeq; HiSeq; MiSeq; MiniSeq; iSeq; NextSeq; iScan; COVIDSeq; VeriSeq; DRAGEN; Illumina Connected Analytics; TruSight Oncology
- Revenue: ▼US$4.37 billion (2024)
- Operating income: ▲US$−833 million (2024)
- Net income: ▼US$−1.22 billion (2024)
- Total assets: ▼US$6.30 billion (2024)
- Total equity: ▼US$2.37 billion (2024)
- Number of employees: 8,970 (2024)
- Website: illumina.com

Illumina, Inc. is an American biotechnology company, headquartered in San Diego, California. Incorporated on April 1, 1998, Illumina develops, manufactures, and markets integrated systems for the analysis of genetic variation and biological function. The company provides a line of products and services that serves the sequencing, genotyping and gene expression, and proteomics markets, and serves more than 155 countries.

Illumina's customers include genomic research centers, pharmaceutical companies, academic institutions, clinical research organizations, and biotechnology companies.

== History ==
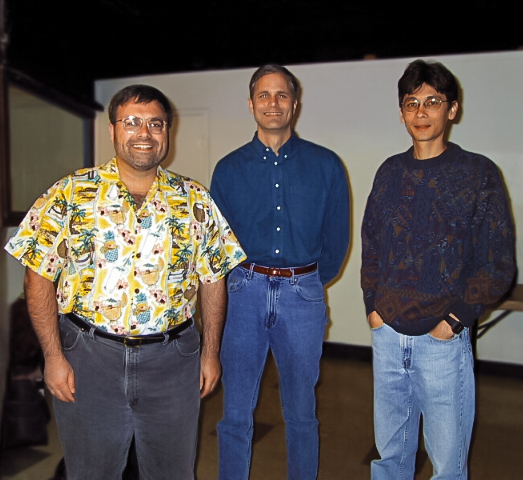
Czarnik, Stuelpnagel, and Chee at their Illumina office in the summer of 1998

Illumina was founded in April 1998 by David Walt, Larry Bock, John Stuelpnagel, Anthony Czarnik, and Mark Chee. While working with CW Group, a venture-capital firm, Bock and Stuelpnagel uncovered what would become Illumina's BeadArray technology at Tufts University and negotiated an exclusive license to that technology. In 1999, Illumina acquired Spyder Instruments (founded by Michal Lebl, Richard Houghten, and Jutta Eichler) for their technology of high-throughput synthesis of oligonucleotides. Illumina completed its initial public offering in July 2000.

Illumina began offering single nucleotide polymorphism (SNP) genotyping services in 2001 and launched its first system, the Illumina BeadLab, in 2002, using GoldenGate Genotyping technology. Illumina currently offers microarray-based products and services for an expanding range of genetic analysis sequencing, including SNP genotyping, gene expression, and protein analysis. Illumina's technologies are used by a broad range of academic, government, pharmaceutical, biotechnology, and other leading institutions around the globe.

On January 26, 2007, the company completed the acquisition of the British company Solexa, Inc. for ~$650M. Solexa was founded in June 1998 by Shankar Balasubramanian and David Klenerman to develop and commercialize genome-sequencing technology invented by the founders at the University of Cambridge. Solexa, Inc. was formed in 2005 when Solexa Ltd reversed into Lynx Therapeutics of Hayward. Illumina also uses the DNA colony sequencing technology, invented in 1997 by Pascal Mayer and Laurent Farinelli and which was acquired by Solexa in 2004 from Manteia Predictive Medicine. It is being used to perform a range of analyses, including whole genome resequencing, gene-expression analysis, and small ribonucleic acid (sRNA) analysis.

In June 2009, Illumina announced the launch of their own Personal Full Genome Sequencing Service at a depth of 30X.

Until 2010, Illumina sold only instruments that were labeled "for research use only"; in early 2010, Illumina obtained FDA approval for its BeadXpress system to be used in clinical tests. This was part of the company's strategy at the time to open its own CLIA lab and begin offering clinical genetic testing itself.

Illumina acquired Epicentre Biotechnologies, based in Madison, Wisconsin, on January 11, 2011. On January 25, 2012, Hoffmann-La Roche made an unsolicited bid to buy Illumina for $44.50 per share or about $5.7 billion. Roche tried other tactics, including raising its offer (to $51.00, for about $6.8 billion). Illumina rejected the offer, and Roche abandoned the offer in April.

In 2014, the company announced a multimillion-dollar product, HiSeq X Ten. In January 2014, Illumina already held 70% of the market for genome-sequencing machines. Illumina machines accounted for more than 90% of all DNA data produced. In 2020, the company invested in the acquisition of the pre-commercial firm Enancio, which had developed a DNA data compression algorithm specifically targeting Illumina data capable of reducing storage footprint by 80% (e.g. 50 GB compressed to 10 GB).

On July 5, 2016, Jay Flatley, who had been CEO since 1999, assumed the role of executive chairman of the board of directors. Francis deSouza, who had been president of the company since 2013, took on the additional role of CEO.

In late 2015, Illumina spun off the company Grail, focused on blood testing for cancer tumors in the bloodstream. In 2017 Grail had planned to raise $1 billion in its second round of financing, and received funding from Bill Gates and Jeff Bezos investing $100 million in series A funding, and with Illumina maintaining a 20% holding share in Grail. Grail is working with a blood test trial with over 120,000 women during scheduled mammogram visits in the states of Minnesota and Wisconsin, as well as a partnership with the Mayo Clinic. Grail uses Illumina sequencing technology for tests. Grail planned to roll out the tests by 2019. In September 2020, Illumina announced a proposed cash and stock deal to acquire Grail for $8 billion.

In November 2018, Illumina proposed the acquisition of Pacific Biosciences for $8.00 per share or around $1.2 billion in total. In December 2019, the Federal Trade Commission (FTC) sued to block the acquisition. The proposed deal was abandoned on January 2, 2020, with Illumina paying Pacific a $98 million termination fee.

In March 2021, the FTC sued to block Illumina's $7.1 billion vertical merger with Grail. In July 2021, the European Commission opened an in-depth investigation into the Grail acquisition by Illumina. Against the orders of active investigations by both the US FTC and the EU European Commission, Illumina publicly announced it had completed its acquisition of Grail on August 18, 2021. The FTC urged Illumina to "unwind" the merger shortly after, and in October 2021, the European Commission ordered Illumina to keep Grail a separate company and adopted interim measures to prevent harm to competition, or face penalty payments up to 5% of their average daily turnover and/or fines up to 10% of their annual worldwide turnover under Articles 15 and 14 of the EU Merger Regulation respectively. In September 2022, a US administrative judge ruled against the FTC's efforts to prevent the acquisition on antitrust grounds. In April 2023, the FTC ordered Grail to be divested by Illumina. In July 2023, the European Commission imposed a €432 million ($476 million) penalty on Illumina for closing the Grail acquisition without EU approval.

In September 2022, Illumina launched NovaSeq X and NovaSeq X Plus. The NovaSeq X Plus can sequence 20,000 genomes per year, compared to 7,500 per year of Illumina's previous machines and generate up to 16 Tb of data per run. The series includes redeveloped reagents, dyes, and polymerases which can be shipped at ambient temperature.

In June 2023, deSouza resigned as CEO of Illumina, and was replaced by interim CEO Charles Dadswell, the company's general counsel. Also in June 2023, Hologic CEO Stephen Macmillan was named non-executive Chairman of the Board of Directors.

In September 2023, Agilent Technologies' senior vice president Jacob Thaysen was appointed CEO.

In October 2023, the European Commission ordered Grail to be divested from Illumina within the next twelve months. Illumina said it would explore a third-party sale or a capital markets transaction if it fails to win its ongoing challenge in court. In June 2024 Illumina has completed the spin-off of Grail, keeping only a minority stake of 14.5%. The 2022 appeal in the case against the European Commission has been settled in September 2024 in favour of Illumina and declaring the merger outside the Commissions jurisdiction. With the repealed decision Illumina concluded the fine to be void.

On February 4, 2025, China placed Illumina on its "Unreliable Entities List" as part of its response to U.S. President Donald Trump's second round of tariffs against it. The company, which competes with the Chinese biotech firm BGI in gene-sequencing, said in a statement that it has had a long-standing presence in China and complied with all the laws and regulations of the countries in which it has operated. On March 4, 2025, China's Ministry of Commerce resolved to prohibit the export of Illumina gene sequencers to China.

=== Acquisition history ===
The following is an illustration of the company's mergers, acquisitions, spin-offs and historical predecessors:

- Illumina, Inc.
  - Spyder Instruments (Acq 1999)
  - CyVera, Inc. (Acq 2005)
  - Solexa, Inc. (Acq 2007)
    - Solexa Ltd (Merged 2005)
    - Lynx Therapeutics Inc. (Merged 2005)
  - Avantome Inc. (Acq 2008)
  - Helixis, Inc. (Acq 2010)
  - Epicentre Biotechnologies (Acq 2011)
  - BlueGnome (Acq 2012)
  - Verinata Health, Inc. (Acq 2013)
  - Advanced Liquid Logic (Acq 2013)
  - NextBio (Acq 2013)
  - Myraqa (Acq 2014)
  - GenoLogics Life Sciences Software Inc. (Acq 2015)
  - Conexio Genomics (Acq 2016)
  - Edico Genome (Acq 2018)
  - Enancio (Acq 2020)
  - BlueBee (Acq 2020)
  - Emedgene (Acq 2021)
  - IDbyDNA (Acq 2022)
  - Partek Inc. (Acq 2023)
  - Fluent (Acq 2024)

== Products ==
=== DNA sequencing ===
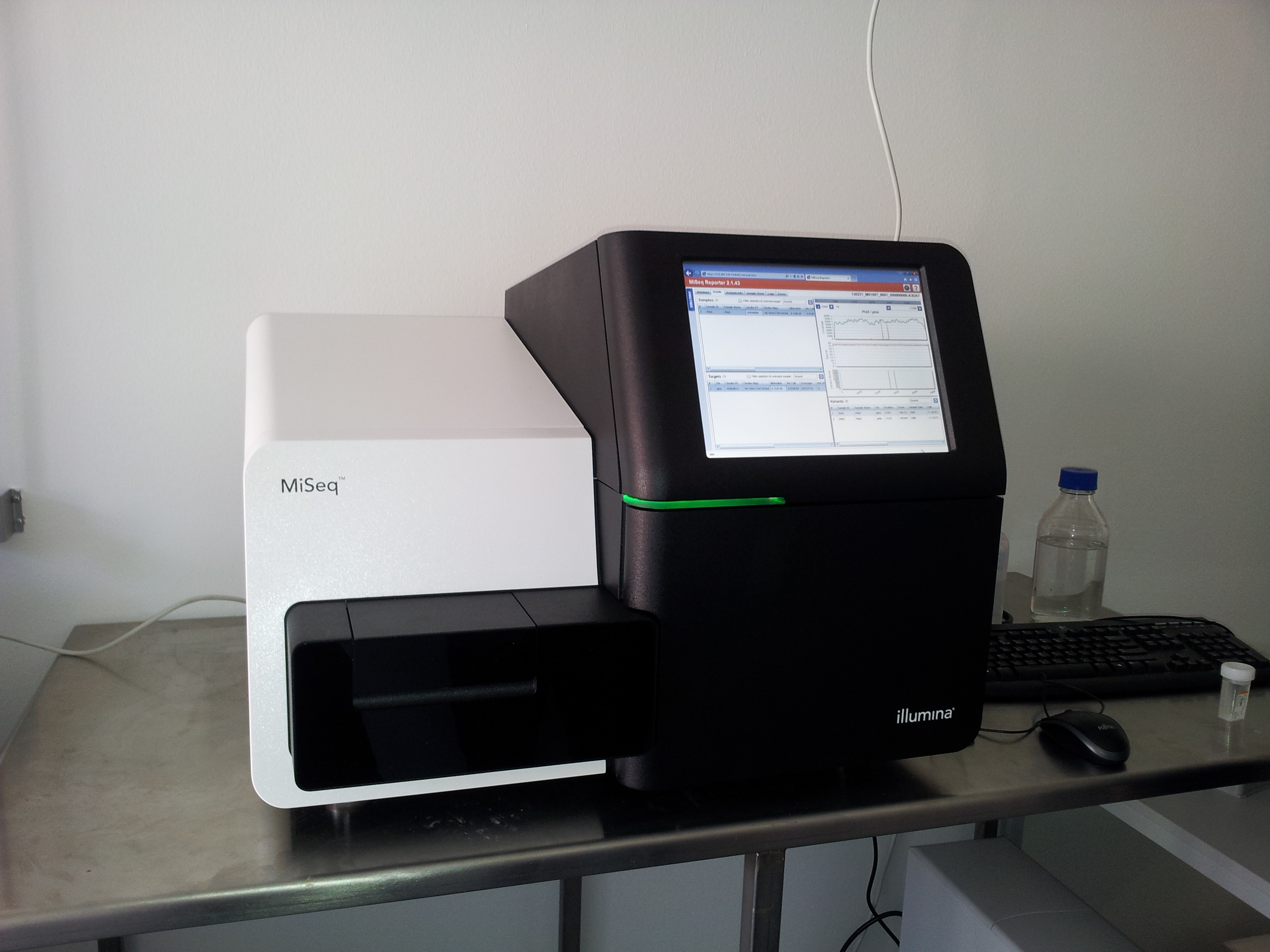
Illumina MiSeq sequencer

Illumina sells a number of high-throughput DNA sequencing systems, also known as DNA sequencers, based on technology developed by Solexa. The technology features bridge amplification to generate clusters and reversible terminators for sequence determination. The technology behind these sequencing systems involves ligation of fragmented DNA to a chip, followed by primer addition and sequential fluorescent dNTP incorporation and detection.

Depending on the kit used, according to the company the MiSeq Series generates up to 25 million reads per run. With dual flow cells, the NextSeq 2000 generates up to 2.4 billion single reads per run and the NovaSeq X Series generates up to 52 billion single reads per run. Illumina uses next-generation sequencing, which is far faster and more efficient than traditional Sanger sequencing. Illumina sequencers perform short-read sequencing, and are image based, utilizing Illumina dye sequencing. This technology has a higher accuracy than long-read sequencing.

== Flow cells ==
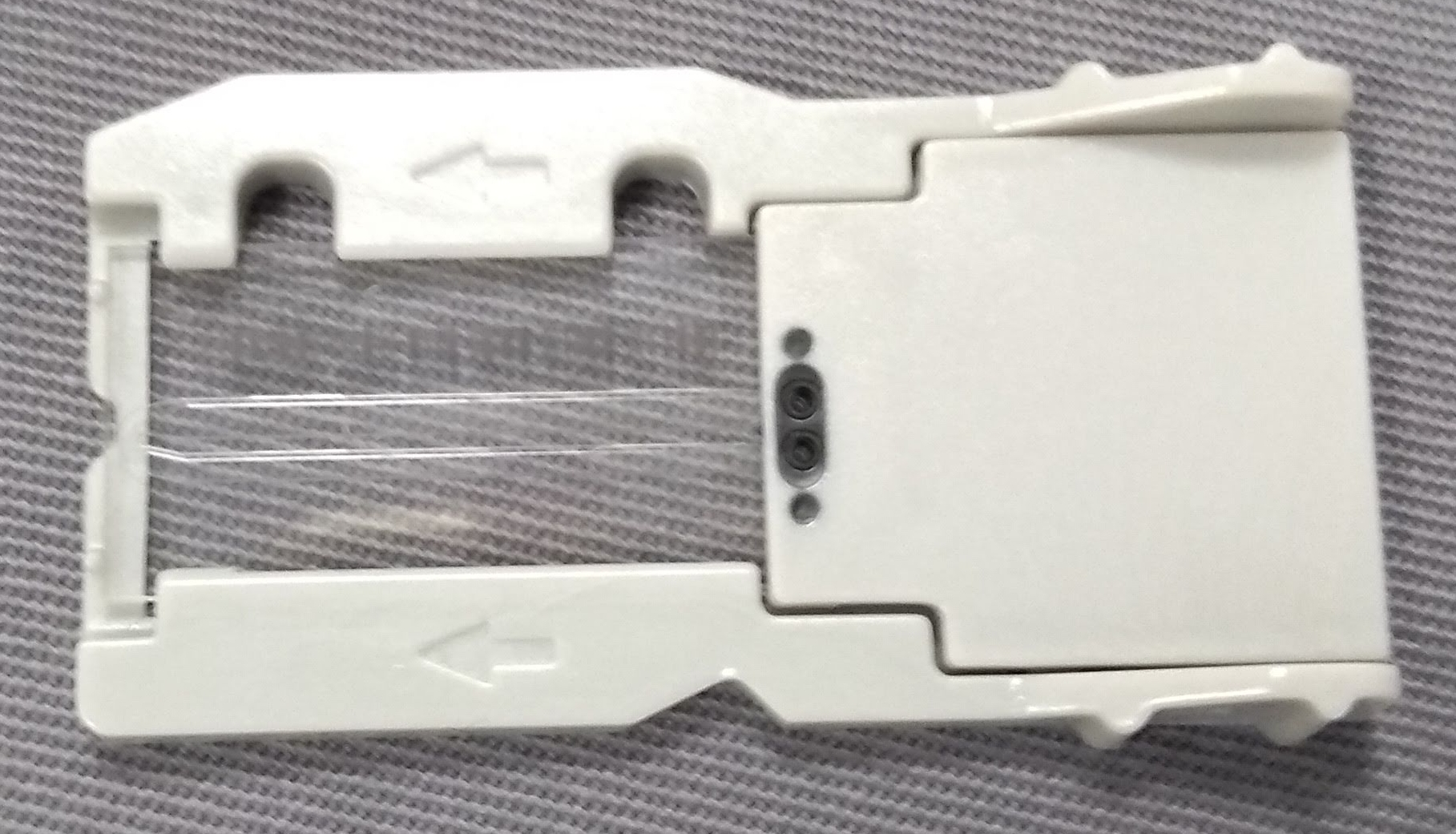
MiSeq Flow Cell (Top)

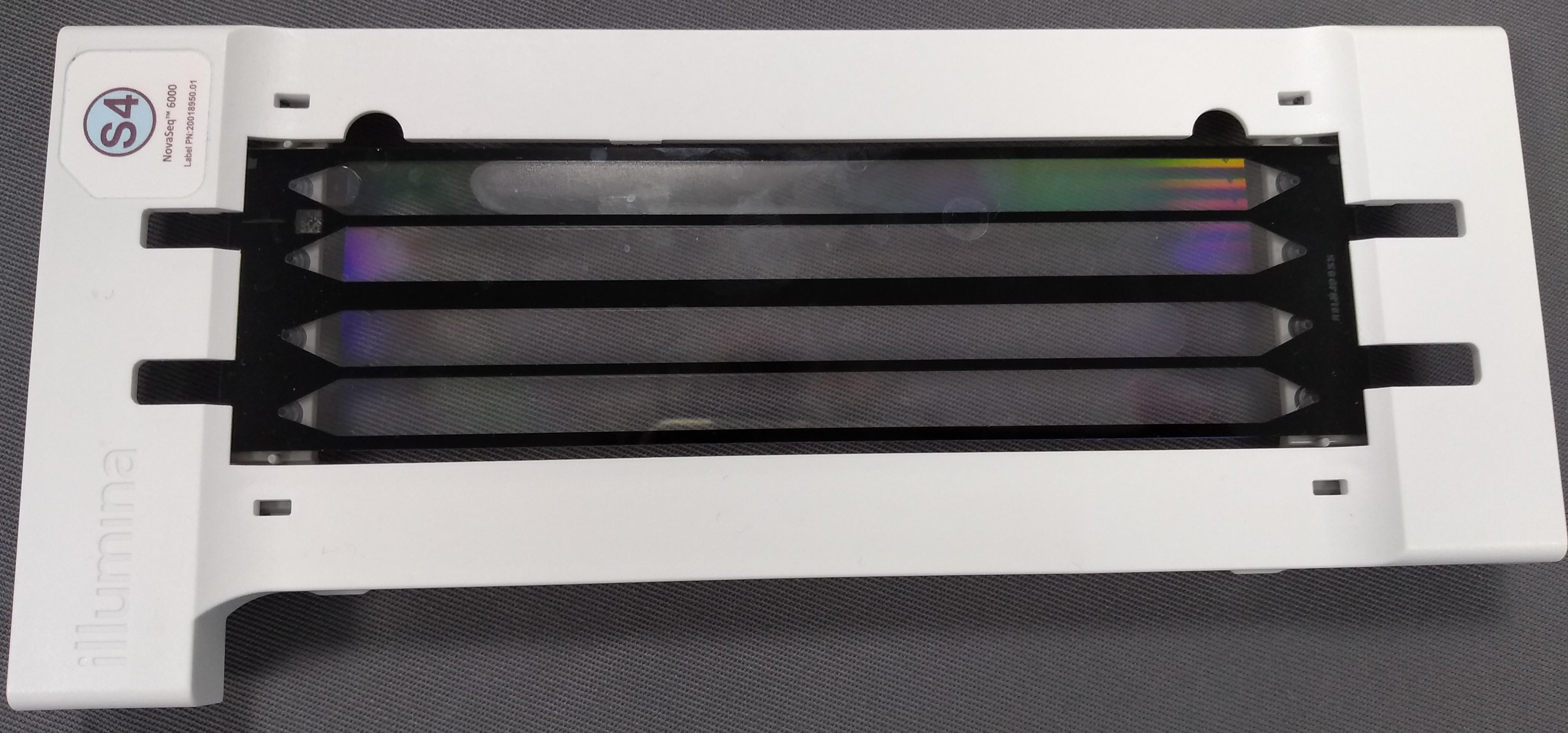
NovaSeq Flow Cell

Illumina sequencing happens within the flow cells. These flow cells are small in size and are housed in the flow cell compartment. Flow cell clustering happens when a denatured DNA sample is placed in a flow cell. Primers already in the flow cell channel capture and bind to the ends of the short denatured DNA sample. Then, DNA polymerase is added and the DNA building blocks are introduced. This results in a newly synthesized strand constrained to the bottom of the flow cell. Next, the original template strand is washed out binding the newly synthesized strand to the other DNA sequence present on the surface. DNA polymerase and building blocks are introduced again forming a new strand. These steps are repeated until about 1,000 copies are made in a cluster.

== Litigation ==
=== Czarnik suit against Illumina ===
In 2005, co-founder and former Chief Scientific Officer Anthony Czarnik sued Illumina. In the case, Czarnik v. Illumina Inc., the trial court granted Illumina's motion to dismiss in part but allowed Czarnik's correction of inventorship claims to continue.

=== Cornell University and Life Technologies suit against Illumina ===
In 2010, Cornell University and Life Technologies filed a lawsuit against Illumina, alleging that its microarray products infringed on eight patents held by the university and exclusively licensed to the start-up. The case was settled in April 2017 without any finding of fault. In September 2017 both parties asked to have the settlement reviewed, with Cornell accusing both Illumina and Life Technologies of misrepresentation and fraud. Cornell claimed that ThermoFisher had promised to settle the suit with Illumina and asked for the Markman wording to be dropped so that it could file a subsequent suit involving other patents invented at Cornell. Instead of filing the suit, ThermoFisher and Illumina settled another lawsuit in California and secretly sublicensed those very same patents. In 2018, Dr. Monib Zirvi filed a lawsuit in the Southern District of New York against Illumina and some of its key employees claiming that they knowingly incorporated ideas and ZipCode DNA sequences invented in the Barany Lab in Illumina's patent applications. Although this suit was dismissed, it was only after Illumina and its attorneys claimed that some of those IP misappropriation were "storm warnings" and thus statutes of limitations had run out on those particular claims. Dr. Monib Zirvi also filed a FOIA case in New Jersey in 2020 for unredacted copies for key NIH grants that Illumina filed early in its existence. William Noon, an in-house attorney at Illumina, had filed a FOIA request for 4 of these key grants as well in January 2015.

=== Patent infringement suits ===
Illumina was a party in a patent lawsuit against competitor Ariosa Diagnostics. The litigation began in 2012 with Verinata Health filing suit against Ariosa. Illumina joined the suit after acquiring Verinata in 2013. Ariosa subsequently brought a counterclaim against Illumina. The trial court granted summary judgment in favor of Ariosa, but the United States Court of Appeals for the Federal Circuit reversed. Ariosa initially pursued an appeal to the Supreme Court of the United States, but the two parties resolved the dispute before the Court decided whether to take the case.

In February 2016, Illumina filed a lawsuit against Oxford Nanopore Technologies. Illumina claimed that Oxford Nanopore infringed its patents on the use of a biological nanopore, Mycobacterium smegmatis porinA (MspA), for sequencing systems. In August 2016 the parties settled their lawsuit.

In February 2020, Illumina filed a patent infringement suit against BGI relating to its "CoolMPS" sequencing products. In return BGI has filed patent infringement lawsuits for violation of federal antitrust and California unfair competition laws, claiming use of "fraudulent behavior" to obtain or enforce sequencing patents that it has asserted against BGI, preventing the firm from entering the US market. However, in May 2022, Illumina was ordered to pay $333 million to a U.S. unit of BGI in California for infringing two patents of DNA-sequencing systems. The jury of the case also said that Illumina willfully infringed the patents, and that their former accusation of BGI's infringement was invalid.

On May 6, 2022, a jury in the U.S. District Court for the District of Delaware rendered a verdict that Illumina willfully infringed two patents owned by Complete Genomics, and awarded approximately $334 million to CGI in past damages. The jury also invalidated three patents owned by Illumina.

=== Trade secrets suit against Eltoukhy and Talasaz ===
In March 2022, Illumina sued Helmy Eltoukhy and Amir Talasaz, the co-founders of Guardant, over stealing trade secrets. Guardant called the lawsuit "frivolous and retaliatory" and framed it as a response to its concerns about the Illumina-Grail merger. Guardant also claimed the lawsuit was filed in order to suppress competition in the marketplace.
