= Czarnik v. Illumina Inc. =

- Court: United States District Court for the District of Delaware
- Decided: July 13, 2006
- Defendant: Illumina, Inc.
- Plaintiff: Anthony Czarnik
- Citation: 437 F. Supp. 2d 252 (D. Del. 2006).

Court membership
- Judge sitting: Joseph James Farnan Jr.

Czarnik v. Illumina Inc., 437 F. Supp. 2d 252 (D. Del. 2006), was a United States patent law case heard before the United States District Court for the District of Delaware. In its ruling, the district court was the first court to hold that reputational harm could be sufficient to establish standing in an action for correction of named inventor under 35 U.S.C. § 256. That ruling led to a split among district courts that has yet to be definitively resolved.

== Background ==
Anthony Czarnik was a chemist and one of the founders of Illumina, serving as its chief scientific officer from 1998 to 2000. He had a falling out with his co-founders, which eventually led to his termination. At the time of his departure, several patent applications had been filed by Illumina listing Czarnik as an inventor or co-inventor. Almost a year after Czarnik left Illumina, a patent attorney for the company sent Czarnik a letter informing him that Illumina had continued to file patent applications on which the company believed Czarnik was a co-inventor, based in part on invention disclosure forms listing Czarnik as such. Illumina sought for Czarnik to assign all rights to the patents to the company, as he had done while he was employed. While reviewing Illumina's patents and applications pending before the United States Patent and Trademark Office (USPTO), Czarnik discovered that Illumina had filed and prosecuted numerous patents that contained his inventions, without identifying him as an inventor. Czarnik sent letters to the USPTO, requesting a correction of inventorship on the patents and pending applications, but the USPTO did not respond.

In June 2005 Czarnik sued Illumina, seeking corrections of inventorship under 35 U.S.C. § 256, seeking declaratory judgments of patent unenforceability, and alleging a state law claim of fraud. Section 256 of the Patent Act states, "Whenever . . . through error an inventor is not named in an issued patent, the [USPTO] Director may . . . issue a certificate correcting such error." If the patent owner will not voluntarily request the change, an omitted inventor may bring a claim in federal court. Czarnik alleged in his complaint that he "suffered damage to his reputation and standing within the scientific community" and did not receive the reputational benefits of being named as an inventor. He also alleged that he was unable to join a start-up company, resulting in a loss of approximately $1 million.

== District Court ==
After Czarnik filed an amended complaint, Illumina filed a motion to dismiss. Illumina argued that Czarnik lacked standing to bring his claim under 35 U.S.C. § 256; in the alternative, Defendant argued that 35 U.S.C. § 256 is inapplicable to pending patent applications. Illumina also argued that there was no case or controversy on which a declaratory judgment action could be based and that Czarnik had failed to state a claim for fraud under Delaware law.

The district court first explained that a plaintiff must meet the standing requirements of Article III of the U.S. Constitution in order to bring a claim in federal court. Therefore, Czarnik had the burden of demonstrating (1) an injury in fact, (2) a causal connection between the injury and conduct complained of, and (3) that the injury was redressable. In omitted inventor cases, a plaintiff must show that he has suffered some sort of pecuniary consequence in order to have standing; mere reputational harm is generally insufficient to establish standing. Illumina argued that Czarnik merely suffered reputational harm and therefore lacked standing.

The district court noted that the Federal Circuit, in Chou v. University of Chicago, had suggested in dicta that it "is not implausible" that reputational injury could satisfy the standing requirements of 35 U.S.C. § 256. In Chou the appellate court noted that "being considered an inventor of important subject matter is a mark of success in one's field… Pecuniary consequences may well flow from being designated as inventor." The district court held that dismissal of Czarnik's §256 claim for lack of standing was not appropriate, noting, "Plaintiff has alleged that he has suffered harm to his reputation and standing in the scientific community. As a result, Plaintiff alleges that he has been unable to secure a position at a start-up company and earn a salary comparable to his salary at Illumina."

As to Illumina's alternate argument, the district court noted that with respect to the pending applications, Czarnik had requested the Court to issue an order directing the USPTO to correct inventorship on the pending applications, relying on 35 U.S.C. 116. The court distinguished Section 116 from Section 256 and agreed with Illumina that the court had no statutory authority to order corrections to pending applications. The court also found there to be no case or controversy relating to the claims for a declaratory judgment and dismissed those claims but found that Czarnik had alleged elements of a state law fraud claim. Therefore, the court granted Illumina's motion in part and denied it in part.

== Significance ==
The holding in Czarnik v. Illumina Inc. was the first time a court held that reputational harm was sufficient to satisfy the standing requirement to bring a correction of inventorship claim. The Czarnik ruling has since been relied on by multiple courts and commentators for the proposition that reputational harm can confer standing on a plaintiff pursuing a claim under 35 U.S.C. § 256. For example, in Hoang v. Abbott Laboratories, the U.S. District Court for the Northern District of Illinois stated that "one court determined that a plaintiff had standing to assert a claim under section 256 for alleged harm to his reputation", referencing Czarnik. Courts and legal scholars have characterized this idea as a "moral right to credit". However, other courts have rejected the theory, leading to a split among district courts that has yet to be definitively resolved. The Federal Circuit in Shukh v. Seagate Technology LLC held that "concrete and particularized reputational injury can give rise to Article III standing." This is true "even where an employee has assigned all of his interest in an invention and cannot pursue an infringement action." The Czarnik ruling was cited to show courts have jurisdiction to declare and correct inventors for issued patents, but not patent applications, where the authority to declare and correct inventors for patent applications “belongs exclusively to the USPTO.” As for common law fraud claims, the Czarnik ruling was cited to show an allegation of common law fraud must demonstrate actual damages, where damages such as a delay in awarding a contract, business trips to respond to an adverse party's conduct, and having to routinely discuss an adverse party's conduct with customers were too speculative to be considered.
