= Stephen P. MacMillan =

American business executive born 1964

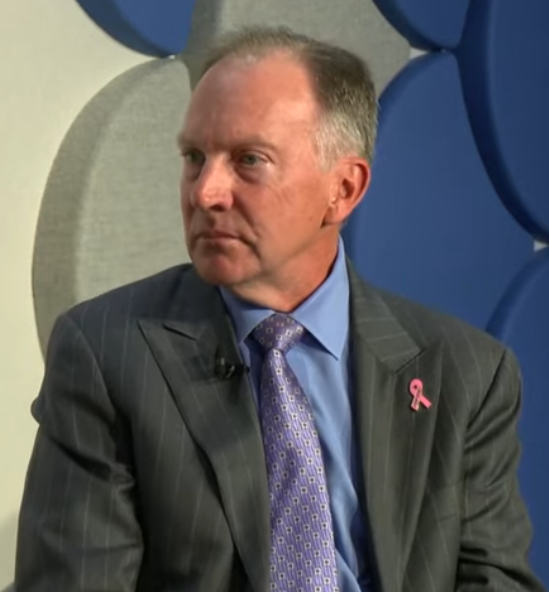
- At the WEF Annual Meeting in 2025
- Born: 1964 (age 61–62); New Jersey, United States
- Education: Davidson College
- Occupation: Business executive
- Known for: Chairman, president and chief executive officer of Hologic
- Spouse(s): Amy MacMillan (m. 1987; div. 2011), Jennifer MacMillan nee Koch

Stephen P. MacMillan (born 1964) is an American business executive who is the former chairman, president and chief executive officer of Hologic, a medical device and diagnostic manufacturing company headquartered in Marlborough, Massachusetts. He is the former CEO of Stryker Corporation, another medical device manufacturer headquartered in Kalamazoo, Michigan.

== Education ==
MacMillan received a B.A degree in Economics from Davidson College, where he was co-captain of the golf team. He is also a graduate of Harvard Business School's Advanced Management Program. MacMillan serves on the Davidson College Board of Trustees.

== Career ==
MacMillan started his career with Procter and Gamble in 1985. He went on to serve 11 years at Johnson & Johnson in various senior roles in the U.S. and in Europe. After that he was a Senior Executive with Pharmacia Corporation.

MacMillan joined Stryker Corporation in 2003 as president and chief operating officer, and was promoted to chief executive officer in 2005. He resigned from the position in February 2012, with the company citing "family reasons." In November 2012, he joined sBiomed, a Utah-based company, as their chief executive officer.

In December 2013, following a settlement with activist shareholder Carl Icahn, medical technology company Hologic named MacMillan their president and chief executive officer. In the aftermath of the forced disappearance of Chinese women's tennis player Peng Shuai, Macmillan expressed support for the Women’s Tennis Association (WTA) as the organization cancelled its events in China. He negotiated a multiyear sponsorship deal with WTA, including Hologic becoming the title sponsor of association.

In June 2023, MacMillan was elected to the Board of Directors of Illumina, Inc. after being nominated by Icahn, and was appointed non-executive Chairman of the board.
