= ACS Combinatorial Science =

- Discipline: Combinatorial chemistry
- Language: English
- Edited by: M. G. Finn

Publication details
- Former name: Journal of Combinatorial Chemistry
- History: 1999 to December 2020
- Publisher: American Chemical Society (US)
- Frequency: Monthly
- Impact factor: 3.381 (2019)

Standard abbreviations
- ISO 4: ACS Comb. Sci.

Indexing
- CODEN: acsccc
- ISSN: 2156-8944
- LCCN: 2010200851
- OCLC no.: 706967757

Links
- Journal homepage

ACS Combinatorial Science (usually abbreviated as ACS Comb. Sci.), formerly Journal of Combinatorial Chemistry (1999-2010), was a peer-reviewed scientific journal, published since 1999 by the American Chemical Society. ACS Combinatorial Science publishes articles, reviews, perspectives, accounts and reports in the field of combinatorial chemistry.

Anthony Czarnik served as the founding editor from 1999 to 2010. M.G. Finn served as Editor from 2010 to 2020. In 2010, ACS agreed to change the name of the journal to "Combinatorial Science" and it was the first and only ACS journal to be devoted to a way of doing science, rather than to a specific field of knowledge or application.

The journal stopped accepting new submissions in August and the last issue was published in December 2020.

== Abstracting and indexing ==
JCS is currently indexed in:

- Chemical Abstracts Service (CAS)
- SCOPUS
- EBSCOhost
- PubMed
- Web of Science
