= Cynosure Lutronic =

American medical technology company

- Industry: Medical Technology
- Founded: 2024; 2 years ago
- Headquarters: Westford, Massachusetts, U.S.
- Website: cynosure.com

Cynosure Lutronic is a medical technology company that develops and manufactures energy-based devices used in dermatology and aesthetic medicine. These devices are then used in dermatology, plastic surgery and medical aesthetics. The company was created in 2024 through the combination of Cynosure, a United States-based medical-aesthetics company, and Lutronic, a South Korean manufacturer of laser and energy-based medical devices . Its headquarters are in Westford, Massachusetts and its Innovation Center in Seoul. The business has a presence in over 130 countries.

== History ==
=== Cynosure ===
Cynosure was established in 1991 and developed laser-based systems for medical and aesthetic procedures. Its products have been used in applications including hair removal, treatment of vascular and pigmented lesions, skin rejuventaion and body contouring.

In 2017, Hologic acquired Cynosure. Hologic later sold the business to investment funds managed by Clayton, Dubilier & Rice in a transaction completed in December 2019.

=== Lutronic ===
Lutronic was founded in South Korea in 1997 by an entrepreneur, Hae-lyung Hwang. The company developed laser and other energy-based systems for dermatology and aesthetic medicine. In its early years, Lutronic developed and commercialized laser systems for clinical use and expanded into international markets. Hahn & Company acquired Lutronic in 2023.

=== Combination and integration ===
In January 2024, Cynosure and Hahn & Company agreed to merge Cynosure and Lutronic. Hahn & Company completed its acquisition of Cynosure in April 2024 and began integrating the two businesses under the parent company Cynosure Lutronic. Nadav Tomer, then chief executive officer of Cynosure, was named chief executive officer of the combined business.

== Products and technologies ==
Cynosure Lutronic develops and markets medical devices that use laser, radiofrequency and other energy-based technologies. The products associated with its two legacy businesses have applications in dermatology and aesthetic medicine.

The applications include dermatologic and aesthetic procedures involving hair removal, vascular and pigmented lesions, tattoo removal, skin resurfacing, soft-tissue coagulation and body contouring.

=== XERF ===
Cynosure Lutronic developed XERF which is a non-invasive, structural skin-tightening and collagen-boosting radiofrequency treatment.

XERF was first launched in South Korea in 2024. In August 2025, the United States Food and Drug Administration determined through the 510(k) process that XERF was substantially equivalent to legally marketed predicate devices. In the United States, the platform is marketed for non-invasive skin-tightening procedures through soft-tissue coagulation. Its use by celebrities is well documented. Kim Kardashian publicly described XERF as her preferred skin-tightening treatment, while Barry Keoghan appeared in a published treatment video and discussed his experience. Other celebrities to use it include Priyanka Chopra Jonas and Naomi Watts.
