= Hologic =

American medical technology company

Hologic, Inc.

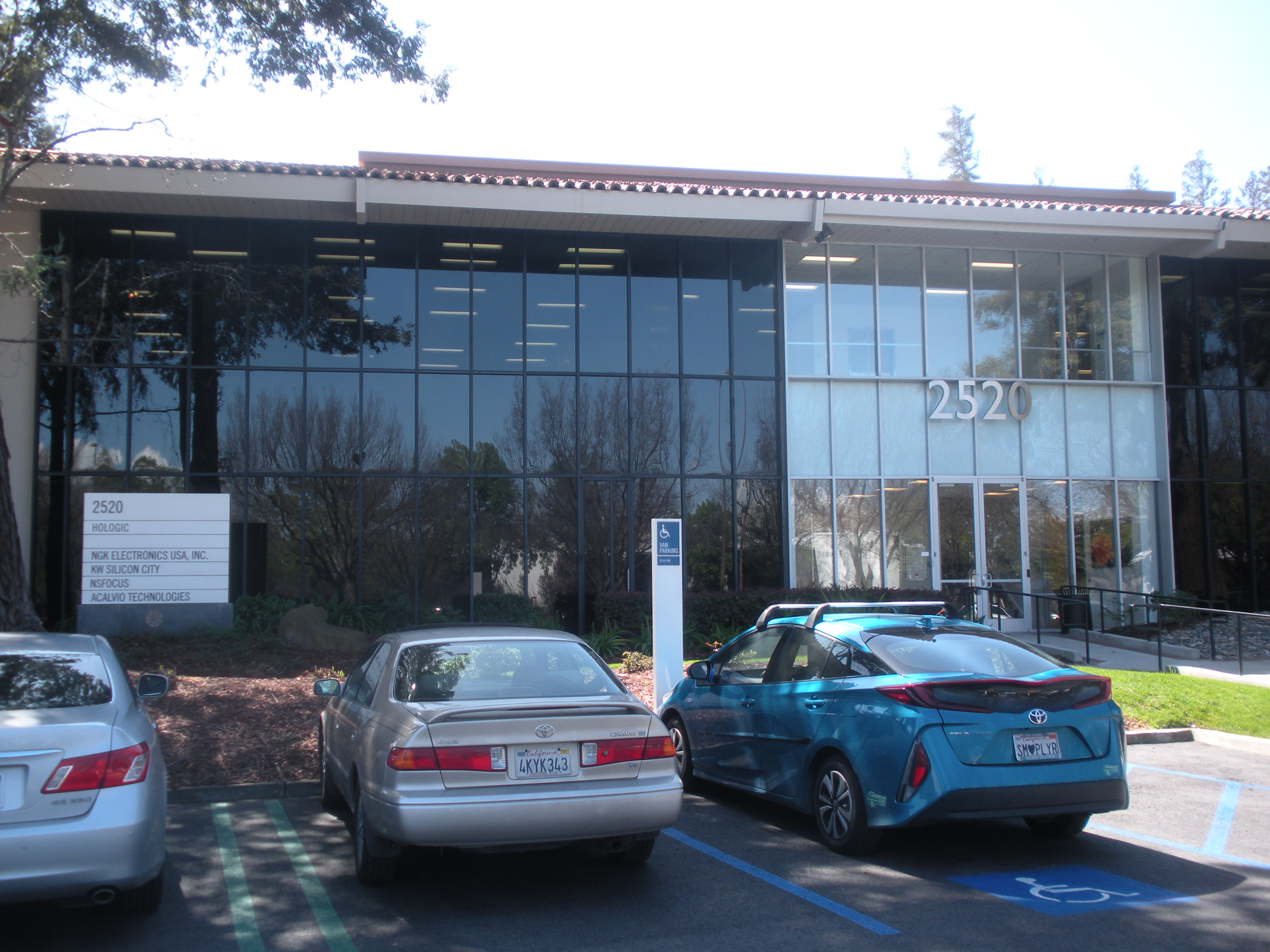
- Satellite office in Santa Clara, California
- Type: Private
- Traded as: Nasdaq: HOLX
- Industry: Medical Technology
- Founded: 1985; 41 years ago
- Headquarters: Marlborough, Massachusetts, U.S.
- Key people: Stephen P. MacMillan (Chairman, President, CEO); Karleen Marie Oberton (CFO); Jay A. Stein (Chairman-Emeritus, CTO, SVP)
- Revenue: ▲US$4.10 billion (2025)
- Operating income: ▼US$714 million (2025)
- Net income: ▼US$566 million (2025)
- Total assets: ▼US$9.01 billion (2025)
- Total equity: ▼US$5.05 billion (2025)
- Number of employees: 7,070 (2025)
- Subsidiaries: Endomag
- Website: hologic.com

Hologic, Inc. is an American medical technology company primarily focused on women's health; it sells medical devices for diagnostics, surgery, and medical imaging.

The company was acquired by Blackstone and TPG in 2026.

== History ==
Hologic completed its acquisition of Cytyc Corporation on October 22, 2007, in a cash-and-stock transaction valued at approximately $6.2 billion. Cytyc expanded Hologic’s presence in women’s health diagnostics and therapies, adding products such as the ThinPrep Pap test for cervical cancer screening, NovaSure endometrial ablation technology, and related diagnostic and imaging capabilities.

In late November 2013, activist investor Carl Icahn disclosed a 12.5% stake in the company. Subsequently, the company adopted a poison pill to prevent a hostile takeover. In negotiations with the company's board of directors, two additional directors backed by Icahn were added to the board, each managing directors of Icahn holding companies. Icahn considered his investment and intervention into Hologic to have been a success, with his nominees to the board of directors resigning on March 3, 2016 and exiting his position by May 16, 2016.

In 2017, Hologic acquired Westford, Massachusetts-based aesthetic medicine company Cynosure for $1.65 billion.

On November 20, 2019, Hologic announced the divestment of Cynosure to Clayton, Dubilier & Rice for $205 million; this was completed on December 30, 2019. Cynosure had around 825 employees at the time of the divestiture.

In March 2020, Hologic received emergency use authorization from the FDA for a test for SARS-CoV-2 to help mitigate the COVID-19 pandemic. In May 2020, Hologic received a second emergency use authorization from the FDA for 2019-nCov to increase potential throughput of testing.

In June 2020, Hologic collaborated with Grifols, a global producer of plasma-driven medicines, to increase Spain's testing capacity for COVID-19.

In November 2020, Hologic won a $119 million contract from the U.S. Department of Health and Human Services and the Department of Defense to help expand production facilities in three states, Wisconsin, Maine, and California, with the goal to provide 13 million COVID tests per month by January 2022.

In January 2021, the company acquired Biotheranostics and its breast and metastatic cancer test portfolio for $230 million as well as SOMATEX for $64 Million.

In April 2021, the company announced it will acquire Mobidiag, a molecular diagnostics firm with multiplex technology, for $795 million. The acquisition completed in June 2021.

In March 2022, Hologic became the title sponsor of the WTA Tour in women's professional tennis. As part of the sponsorship, the company was also named the "official health partner" of the Women's Tennis Association.

In April 2024, Hologic agreed to acquire British medical device manufacturer Endomag for $310 million. The acquisition completed in July that year.

In 2025, Hologic acquired Gynesonics for $350 million, which developed the Sonata System, an ultrasound imaging device for uterine fibroids.

In October 2025, private equity firms Blackstone and TPG announced they had agreed to a deal to buy Hologic for $18.3 billion including debt, taking the company private. It was reported to be the largest medical devices deal in almost two decades, since Boston Scientific bought Guidant Corp for $27 billion in 2006.

=== Acquisition history ===
- Hologic, Inc. (Founded 1985)
  - Gen-Probe Incorporated (Acq 2012)
  - Cynosure, Inc. (Acq 2017)
  - Biotheranostics, Inc. (Acq 2021)
  - SOMATEX Medical Technologies GmbH (Acq 2021)
  - Mobidiag Oy (Acq 2021)
  - Endomagnetics Ltd (Acq 2024)
  - Gynesonics, Inc. (Acq 2025)
