= Serono =

Switzerland based biotechnology company

Serono S.A.
- Type: S.A
- Industry: Biotechnology; Pharmaceutical
- Founded: 1906
- Founder: Cesare Serono
- Defunct: 2006; 20 years ago
- Fate: Acquired by Merck Group
- Successor: Merck Serono
- Headquarters: Geneva, Switzerland (former Headquarters)
- Key people: Claudio Bertarelli (Chairman); Ernesto Bertarelli (CEO)
- Products: Rebif; Gonal-f; Luveris; Ovidrel/Ovitrelle; Serostim; Saizen; Zorbtive; Raptiva
- Parent: Merck Group

Serono was a biotechnology company headquartered in Geneva, Switzerland. It was acquired by the German pharmaceutical company Merck in 2006. The company was founded as the Serono Pharmacological Institute by Cesare Serono in 1906 in Rome, Italy. Serono was incorporated in 1987 and the holding company, Ares-Serono S.A., changed its name to Serono S.A. in May 2000, the same year that its CEO, Ernesto Bertarelli, led a listing on the New York Stock Exchange.

Serono developed and marketed pharmaceuticals in the fields of reproductive health, multiple sclerosis, growth & metabolism and dermatology. A key step in its development was the discovery of a method of extracting urinary gonadotropins by Dr. Piero Donini. A decade after his discovery, a partnership with Professor Bruno Lunenfeld led to gonadotropins being able to become a widely available and commercially successful treatment for infertility, marketed by the company as Pergonal. Serono obtained the biological material for the gonoadtropin extraction from the urine of Italian nuns, thanks to the connections of one of its board members, Giulio Pacelli, who was the nephew of Pope Pius XII.

In the 1980s, the company moved from natural extraction into biotechnology, a process begun by its CEO Fabio Bertarelli and accelerated by his son, Ernesto Bertarelli. Its eight biotechnology products were available in four core therapeutic areas: neurology for the treatment of relapsing forms of multiple sclerosis; reproductive health for treatments of infertility (with the recombinant version of Pergonal marketed as Gonal-f); dermatology, where Serono launched biologics in Europe for moderate-to-severe psoriasis, and growth and metabolism for treatments for HIV-associated wasting and growth deficiencies.

A particular commercial success was its drug, REBIF, used to treat Multiple Scleroris. Introduced in 1998 to treat relapsing-remitting MS, the most common form of the degenerative disease. By 1999 it had generated $143 million in sales, but was barred by provisions of the Orphan Drug Act from entering the US market, where Biogen’s treatment, Avonex, held orphan status. Bertarelli and Serono invested significant resources into a clinical trial to try to demonstrate the clinical superiority of their treatment. The trial was successful and the company was able to enter the US market. By 2002, REBIF accounted for 39% of Serono’s sales.

The company also conducted research in oncology and autoimmune diseases. Through the acquisition in 1997 of GBRI from GlaxoWelcome, becoming its Geneva based research institute named SPRI, and the Manteia Predictive Medicine spin-off, Serono also nursed the emergence of massive parallel sequencing technology.

== Sale to Merck KGaA ==
36% of Serono was sold to Merck KGaA in Sept. 2006 for €13.3 billion; Merck KGaA paid CHF 1,100 for each share. The new entity, which merges Serono with Merck's Ethicals division, is called Merck Serono. Its headquarters was in Geneva, within the new Serono facilities. The US operations remain near Boston and was renamed here EMD Serono due to trademark issues with Merck & Co./MSD. The process of merging started in January 2007 after various business regulatory reviews and phases were complete. Until that time, Serono and Merck KGaA operated as separate entities. The new, combined entity, Merck Serono is the size of other large biotechs. In 2011, a decision was made to close the Geneva headquarters and move the headquarters to Darmstadt, Germany resulting in job losses to most of the employees in Geneva.

== Facilities ==
Serono operated in 44 countries, with manufacturing facilities in eight countries and sales in over 90 countries. Main manufacturing sites were in Switzerland, Italy, Spain and France; a fifth facility in Israel was closed in 2004 owing to its obsolescence. Research and development facilities were maintained in Geneva, Switzerland, Boston, USA, and Ivrea, Italy. It employed over 4,750 people with worldwide revenues of USD 2,586.4 million (2005). It had eight biotechnology products on the market, and more than 25 ongoing preclinical and clinical development projects at the end of 2005. Serono Headquarters and the Geneva research site moved to a brand new campus (Horizon Secheron) in the heart of Geneva in 2006. This facility and the headquarters were closed by Merck KGaA in 2013. The building was sold back to a consortium composed of the Bertarelli family and Hansjörg Wyss, who retained it as a life sciences hub for the Lake Geneva region, now called Campus Biotech.

== Lawsuit ==
In 2005, Serono agreed to a $704 million settlement with the Department of Justice to resolve civil and criminal allegations that the company engaged in a fraudulent scheme to promote the drug Serostim for off-label uses and paid out illegal kickbacks for prescribing the drug in violation of the False Claims Act. The settlement is, to date, the ninth largest pharmaceutical settlement in U.S. history.

== Fertility LifeLines ==
Serono provides Fertility LifeLines as a free and confidential source of information to infertility patients.

== Notes and references ==
1. 2002 Form 20-F. Retrieved July 3, 2005.
2. 2004 Form 20-F. Retrieved July 3, 2005.

== See also ==
- List of pharmaceutical companies
- Pharmaceutical industry in Switzerland
