= Nelson J. Leonard =

American organic and bioorganic chemist (1916–2006)

- Born: Nelson Jordan Leonard; September 1, 1916; Newark, New Jersey, United States
- Died: October 9, 2006 (aged 90); Pasadena, California, United States
- Education: Lehigh University; University of Oxford; Columbia University
- Known for: Organic synthesis of nitrogen-containing compounds; cytokinin chemistry; fluorescent and dimensional probes of nucleic acids and enzyme–coenzyme interactions
- Awards: National Academy of Sciences (1955); American Academy of Arts and Sciences (1961); American Philosophical Society (1996); ACS Arthur C. Cope Scholar (1995)
- Scientific career
- Fields: Organic chemistry, Bioorganic chemistry
- Workplaces: University of Illinois Urbana–Champaign; California Institute of Technology
- Doctoral advisor: Robert Elderfield

Nelson Jordan Leonard (September 1, 1916 – October 9, 2006) was an American organic and bioorganic chemist known for his contributions to the chemistry of nitrogen-containing compounds and for applying synthetic methods to problems in biochemistry and plant physiology. His work encompassed alkaloid synthesis, nitrogen heterocycles, cytokinins, and the development of chemical and fluorescent probes for studying nucleic acids and enzyme–coenzyme interactions.

== Early life and education ==
Leonard was born on September 1, 1916, in Newark, New Jersey, to Harvey Nelson Leonard and Olga Pauline Jordan. He was raised in Mount Vernon, New York, where he attended public schools and developed early interests in science and music.

Leonard enrolled at Lehigh University in 1933, initially intending to study chemical engineering before switching to chemistry. He graduated with a B.S. in 1937 and was awarded a Rhodes Scholarship to the University of Oxford. At Oxford, he studied chemistry under Leslie Sutton and was influenced by leading chemists including Robert Robinson, Cyril Hinshelwood, and Nevil Sidgwick.

The outbreak of World War II in 1939 led Leonard to return to the United States, where he continued his graduate studies at Columbia University. He received his Ph.D. in chemistry in 1942 under the supervision of Robert Elderfield, working on the structure and partial synthesis of naturally occurring antimalarial compounds.

== Career ==
Following completion of his Ph.D., Leonard joined the University of Illinois at Urbana–Champaign as a postdoctoral researcher with Roger Adams and soon became a member of the faculty. During World War II, he contributed to research on the synthesis and production of chloroquine as part of a coordinated effort to develop antimalarial drugs for use by Allied forces.

After the war, Leonard remained at the University of Illinois, where he spent more than four decades as a member of the chemistry faculty and was later appointed the Reynold C. Fuson Professor of Chemistry and professor of biochemistry.

In 1955, Leonard was elected to the National Academy of Sciences. During a sabbatical in 1960, he broadened his research interests to include biochemical problems, marking a transition toward bioorganic chemistry that shaped much of his later work.

Leonard retired from the University of Illinois in 1986 but remained active in research and mentoring. He subsequently held positions as a Fogarty Scholar-in-Residence at the National Institutes of Health and as a visiting professor at the University of California, San Diego. In 1991 he was appointed a Sherman Fairchild Distinguished Scholar at the California Institute of Technology, where he continued as a faculty associate until his death in 2006.

== Research ==
Leonard’s research centered on the application of organic synthesis to problems in chemistry, biochemistry, and biology, an approach he described as “organic synthesis with a purpose.”

Early in his career, he developed synthetic methods for alkaloids and nitrogen-containing heterocycles, including reductive cyclization strategies that enabled the preparation of complex natural products and the study of their stereochemistry. He also investigated transannular reactions in medium-ring systems and established relationships between molecular structure and spectroscopic properties.

Leonard later expanded his work into bioorganic chemistry, contributing to the chemistry and biological activity of cytokinins, a class of plant hormones that regulate cell division and growth. In collaboration with plant physiologist Folke Skoog, he synthesized cytokinin analogs and contributed to the identification of naturally occurring cytokinins, helping to establish structure–activity relationships that informed their biological function.

Further work demonstrated that cytokinin-active compounds occur as modified nucleosides in transfer RNA, linking cytokinin chemistry to nucleic acid structure and function.

A major component of Leonard’s later research involved the development of chemical probes for studying nucleic acids and enzyme–coenzyme interactions. His laboratory synthesized fluorescent nucleotide analogs, including modified adenosine monophosphates, that could be used to monitor biochemical processes in enzyme systems.

He also developed “dimensional probes,” synthetic nucleotide analogs designed to test the spatial constraints of enzyme active sites by systematically altering molecular geometry, providing insight into molecular recognition and enzyme binding interactions.

== Awards and honors ==
Leonard was elected to the National Academy of Sciences in 1955. He was also a Fellow of the American Academy of Arts and Sciences and a Member of the American Philosophical Society.

He received the ACS Award for Creative Work in Synthetic Organic Chemistry and the Roger Adams Award in Organic Chemistry, and was later named an ACS Arthur C. Cope Scholar.

== Personal life ==
Leonard was married to Louise Vermey, whom he met prior to World War II; they married after the war and remained together until her death in 1987. He later married Peggy Phelps in 1992. He had four children: Kenneth, James, David, and Marcia.

In addition to his scientific career, Leonard was an accomplished bass-baritone singer and performed as a soloist with major orchestras, including the Chicago Symphony Orchestra, the Cleveland Orchestra, and the St. Louis Symphony.

Leonard died on October 9, 2006, at his home in Pasadena, California, at the age of 90.
