= Endomag =

British nedical device manufacturer

Endomagnetics Ltd
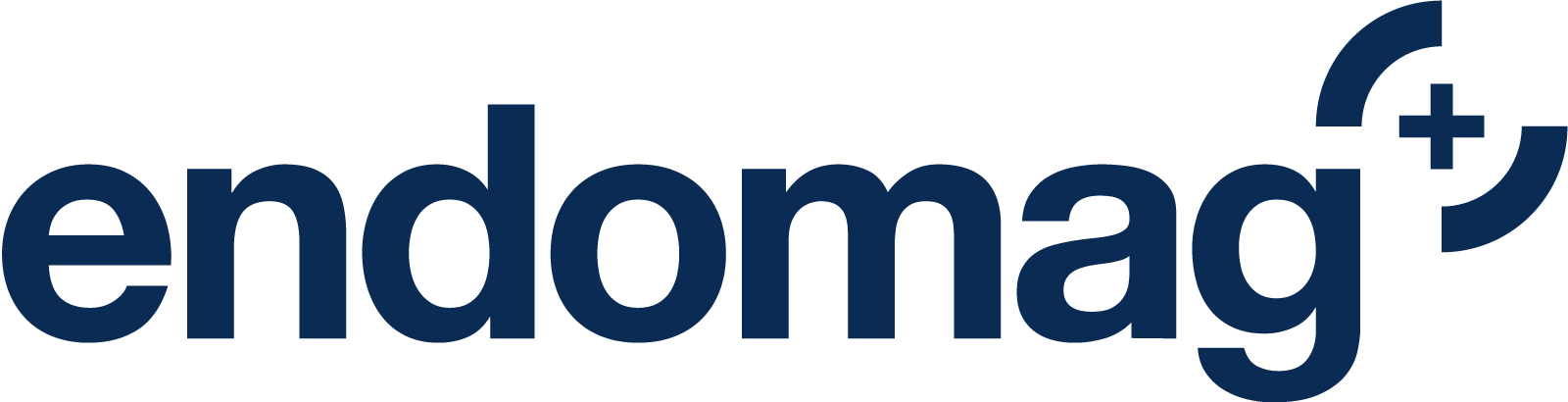
- Type: Subsidiary
- Industry: Medical device manufacturer, surgical guidance for cancer care
- Founded: 2007
- Headquarters: Cambridge, UK
- Area served: Worldwide
- Key people: Dr Eric Mayes (CEO); Dr Quentin Harmer (CTO); Dr Andrew Shawcross (COO); Mathew Stephens (CMO)
- Parent: Hologic
- Website: endomag.com

Endomagnetics Ltd (commonly Endomag) is a British medical device manufacturer, headquartered in Cambridge. The company was founded in 2007 and produces surgical guidance products which assist surgeons in locating and removing cancerous tumors, predominantly for breast cancer surgery. The company's products are distributed by Leica Biosystems in North America and Sysmex Corporation across Europe. Since 2024, Endomag is a subsidiary of Hologic.

The company's location at Cambridge Science Park in Cambridge is central to Silicon Fen, the cluster of high-tech businesses in the area which form one of the most important technology centres in Europe.

== History ==
Endomag was founded in 2007 as Endomagnetics Ltd as a University spin-off from University College London and the University of Houston. Helped by initial seed money from UCL Business, Endomag has continued to develop its magnetic sensing technologies to improve minimally invasive procedures for oncologists.

In June 2014, the company acquired the magnetic hyperthermia assets of the US-based Actium Biosystems. In 2015, the company moved offices from Cambridge Science Park to its current headquarters at The Jeffrey's Building on the St John's Innovation Park. The office was opened by Lord Sainsbury.

In July 2018, the company announced a further round of venture capital funding, a Series C for $10m (£8m) led by Draper Esprit, the European arm of Silicon Valley investor, Tim Draper's venture capital business.

In April 2024, American medical device manufacturer Hologic agreed to acquire Endomag for $310 million. The acquisition completed in July that year.

== Technologies ==
Endomag's Sentimag probe is a sensitive magnetometer which detects either an implantable magnetic marker, Magseed, or an injectable superparamagnetic iron oxide nanoparticle tracer, branded Magtrace.

The Magseed marker is placed in a tumor under imaging guidance prior to surgery, and located and removed during surgery. The company's magnetic probe can indicate the distance from the Magseed marker, which helps guide the surgical excision of the cancerous tumor. The Magtrace liquid marker is injected near the tumor prior to surgery and migrates to the lymph nodes draining the primary tumour, the so-called ‘sentinel’ nodes. These can then be detected and excised during a sentinel lymph node biopsy procedure. The company's products are a radiation-free alternative for breast cancer surgeons.

Endomag's Magseed marker product has received FDA 510(k) clearance for localizing tumors in soft tissue in 2016 and its Magtrace and Sentimag Magnetic Localization System received FDA premarket approval (PMA) in 2018 to identify and remove sentinel lymph nodes in women undergoing mastectomy for breast cancer.

== Awards ==
The company has won a number of business, engineering and science awards since its inception. In 2015, the company was shortlisted for the MacRobert Award, a leading UK engineering award. The following year saw Endomag awarded with an Institute of Physics Commended Innovation award.

In 2018, Endomag received a Queen's Awards for Enterprise in the Innovation category. In July 2018, the company was presented this award by Julie Spence OBE, the current Lord Lieutenant of Cambridgeshire. In October 2018 the company received a Business Innovation Award from the Institute of Physics for its use of magnetism for minimally invasive surgical guidance.
