= Larry Bock =

American entrepreneur (1959–2016)

- Born: Lawrence A. Bock; September 21, 1959; Brooklyn, New York, US
- Died: July 6, 2016 (aged 56)
- Education: Bowdoin College; UCLA
- Occupations: Entrepreneur, Cofounder of Illumina, Inc.

Lawrence A. Bock (September 21, 1959 – July 6, 2016) was an American entrepreneur who has aided in starting or financing 50 early-stage growth companies, with a combined market value of more than $70 billion.

== Early life and education ==
Bock was born in Brooklyn, New York, and raised in Chappaqua to parents Ulrike Proctor and Richard Bock. Larry had one older sibling Steven who was deaf. He received a degree in biochemistry from Bowdoin College and an MBA from UCLA. After school, he worked for Genentech. Bock was a donor, co-founder, and the executive director of USA Science and Engineering Festival.

== Career ==
Bock was highlighted as a "keystone species" in the ecosystem of Silicon Valley in the book The Rainforest. A keystone species, in the innovation context, is someone who connects people who would benefit from working together, but who would not work together under normal circumstances because of trust, distance, and/or cultural barriers.

Bock was previously a CEO of Nanosys, where he helped to raise $55 million in funding. Bock was also a special limited partner with Lux Capital.

Bock founded multiple companies:

- Illumina, a biotechnology company for genetic products
- Nanosys, a nanotechnology company for optics and batteries
- Pharmacopeia biotechnology, a company investigating small molecule combinatorial chemistry
- Idun Pharmaceuticals, a company developing drugs targeting apoptosis
- Caliper Life Sciences, which aids in drug discovery.
- Neurocrine Biosciences, which develops treatments for neurological and endocrine-related diseases and disorders.
- Science Spark, a nonprofit group advocating for science, technology, engineering, and math (STEM) education

=== San Diego Science Festival ===
Bock founded the festival in 2009. The festival became and annual event that is known as San Diego Festival of Science and Engineering. Bock worked with Lockheed Martin to start the festival in San Diego. Brock stated in 2014, “As a society, we get what we celebrate. We celebrate athletes, pop stars and Hollywood actors and actresses, but we don’t celebrate science and engineering.”

=== USA Science and Engineering Festival ===
Bock also founded the USA Science and Engineering Festival, which was to promote STEM (science, technology, engineering, and math). The festival was based in Washington D.C. It premiered on the National Mall but was later moved to the Walter E. Washington Convention Center where it attracted more than 350,000 participants in 2016, making it the largest event housed in the convention center. In recognition of the success of the Festival, Bock was awarded the Viktor Hamburger Outstanding Educator Prize from the Society for Developmental Biology in 2014.

== Personal life ==
Bock was married to Diane Birnie Bock for thirty years and had two daughters, Quincy Bock Stokes and Tasha Bock (Scruggs).

Bock suffered from Stargardt disease, an inherited form of macular degeneration that causes progressive loss of vision. He was legally blind by the age of 29.

Bock died from pancreatic cancer on July 6, 2016.
