= Fox River Paper Company Historic District =

- U.S. National Register of Historic Places
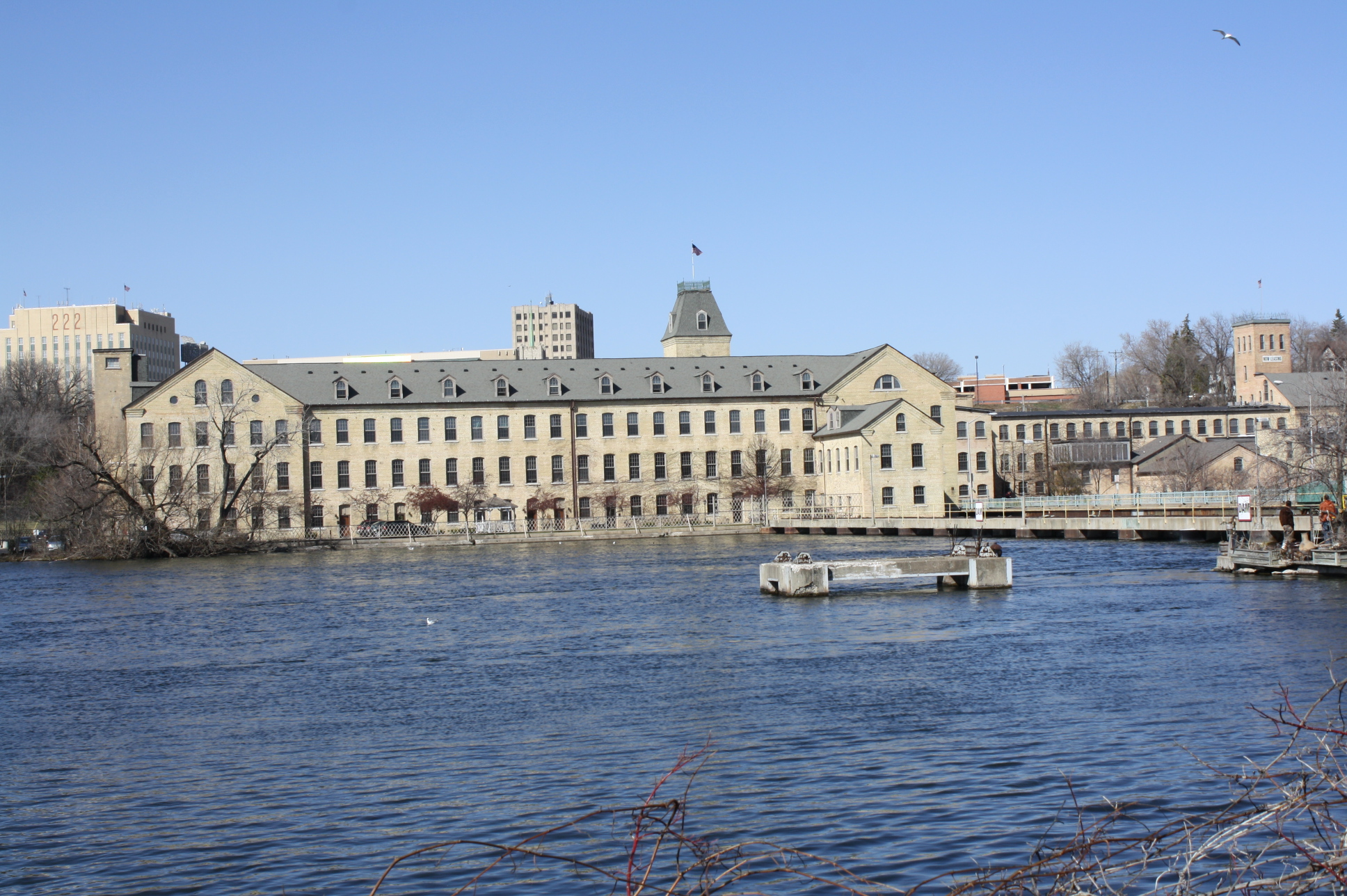
- The Fox River Paper Company Mills

- Location within Wisconsin Location within the United States
- Location: 405-406, 415 S. Olde Oneida St., Appleton, Wisconsin
- Coordinates: 44°15′31″N 88°24′18″W
- Area: 5 acres (2.0 ha)
- Built: 1883-1915
- Architect: E.D. Jones
- Architectural style: Romanesque and Italianate
- NRHP reference No.: 90000639
- Added to NRHP: April 19, 1990

The Fox River Paper Company Historic District, now known as the Historic Fox River Mills, is a complex of paper mill buildings in Appleton, Wisconsin, United States, built from 1883 to 1915. The historic district includes the Romanesque-styled Ravine/Rag Mills, the Italianate-styled Lincoln Mill which originally milled flour, and the Italianate-styled Fox River Mill. The site is now used as apartments but also retains a functioning hydroelectric canal and privately owned generating station. This hydroelectric infrastructure continues a tradition of electricity from water power dating from the 1880s which makes the Lower Fox River the oldest hydroelectric generation region in the United States.
