= Manteia Predictive Medicine =

Manteia Predictive Medicine S.A. (initially incorporated under the name "GenInEx S.A.") was a start-up company created in November 2000 as a spin-off of Serono, a Swiss-based biotechnology company, now part of Merck-Serono, by private founders. Its aim was to provide preventive and curative treatment guidelines for common and complex diseases. These guidelines were envisaged as composed of two parts:

- a "personal genome card" containing the entire genome sequence of the person holding the card
- an Internet link to a treatment database to be referenced by doctors

The company was basing its strategy on the development of so-called "DNA colony sequencing" technology (now commercialized by Illumina), its proprietary massive parallel sequencing technology whose development had been initiated in late 1996 at Glaxo-Welcome's Geneva Biomedical Research Institute (GBRI), by Pascal Mayer and Laurent Farinelli. This work has been protected by several patents and patents applications, publications and was discussed in presentations at international conferences from 1998 to 2001.

By the end of 2003, while the company was progressing along its plans towards realizing an industrial instrument capable of sequencing a complete human genome in approximately 24 hours, strategic considerations led the main shareholder (Serono) to sell Manteia's colony DNA sequencing technology to UK based Solexa Ltd, now part of Illumina (company).

== See also ==
- Illumina dye sequencing
