= Mary Agria =

American writer

- Born: March 21, 1941 (age 85); United States
- Education: University of Wisconsin–Madison (BA, MA); University of Bonn
- Occupation: Author

Mary A. Agria (born March 24, 1941) is an American writer who spent her early career as a journalist and non-fiction writer, then in 'retirement' began writing a series of novels that deal with the issues facing older Americans, including finding meaning in one's senior years, resolving parent-child relationships and facing the ultimate realities of change and loss that are part of the human experience.

In 2006 her novel, Time in a Garden, appeared on best-seller fiction lists all over northern Michigan. She has written five novels (For Things Left Undone, 2001; Time in a Garden, 2006; Vox Humana: The Human Voice, 2007; In Transit, 2008; and Community of Scholars, 2009) and numerous non-fiction books, articles and texts.

== Life and influences ==
=== Childhood ===
Agria grew up in Appleton, Wisconsin where her mother worked as executive secretary to the president of a large fraternal life insurance company. Her father was a mechanical engineer with an international paper company. Family life instilled in her a deep love of writing and travel. As a sixth grader she wrote the winning script about Stephen Foster for a school drama contest. In high school and early college, she worked as a journalist summers for The Post-Crescent in Appleton, the paper that gave Pulitzer Prize–winning novelist Edna Ferber her start—a writer whose style Agria always admired.

=== Education ===
She earned her BA in English (1964) and an MA in German literature and linguistics from the University of Wisconsin–Madison in 1965. She spent 1962 and 1963 studying theater arts at the University of Bonn, Germany thanks to a Marshall Plan scholarship. Her undergrad thesis on the songs in Bertolt Brecht's Three Penny Opera and John Gay's Beggar's Opera was a winner of the UWM undergrad essay competition.

=== Early career ===
After a job in Public Relations and as freelance editor at UW Press-Madison, Agria became director of a Work-Education Council in Alma, Michigan designated by the US Department of Labor as a model for innovative community development programs. The experience resulted in consultancies and freelance writing assignments in the career field and on rural issues. Periodic moves throughout her marriage to now retired University President Dr. John Agria opened many diverse job and life changes all of which she uses in her writing. She wrote grants for a Long Island, NY, music school, worked as chaplain for United Campus Ministries in New York, and directed a community development think-tank at Thiel College in Pennsylvania. As researcher for the Center for Theology and Land in Dubuque, Iowa, she traveled extensively, studied and wrote about rural life.

=== Recent years ===
Community building remains an important undercurrent in her novels, the power of relationships to promote growth and change. A church organist since her early teens, after "retiring" to Long Island, New York, Agria served as organist/music director of several churches — a background she put to good use in her novel, Vox Humana: The Human Voice. One of her many accomplishments as a church music director was producing and directing a fully staged medieval mystery play, Nativity, from her script compiled from several early manuscripts. She also learned to weave for Vox Humana, seeing strong ties between music and that ancient art form. A love of community gardening in the northern Michigan summer Chautauqua community of Bay View inspired her 2006 best-selling novel, Time in a Garden — a love song to the aging process, spirituality and gardening. In Transit, about lives and families in transition, was researched on travels with her husband in their motor home, including a 2007 coast-to-coast book tour.

She is a mother of four daughters and has several grandchildren. Themes of family and community are present in her work.

== Selected works ==
=== Novels ===
- For Things Left Undone, 2001
- Time in a Garden, 2006
- Vox Humana: The Human Voice, 2007
- In Transit, 2008
- Community of Scholars, 2009

=== Nonfiction books and texts ===
- "Enhancing Traditional and Innovative Rural Support Services," chapter in Toward a Rural Renaissance (USDOL 1981)
- Building Rural Linkages: a guide for work-education councils (MDOL 1981)
- Building Healthy Communities: Stories of 12 communities in the Midwest (Studies in Rural Ministry 1995)
- Winning the Rat Race: a common sense guide to job hunting and work force survival (1995, Wm. C. Brown)
- Rural Congregational Studies: a guide for good shepherds (co-author, 1997, Abingdon)
- Planting the Seeds of Community (vols. 1-2, Center for Theology and Land)
- Articles and scholarly pieces: for Jo Bonomo How-To Series, Journal of the National Case Institute, Julien's Journal; a syndicated column on work and education ('Winning the Rat Race/Work Links', 20 years) in newspapers in Iowa and Pennsylvania; and currently a column on gardening and spirituality ('Time in a Garden') in the Petoskey, MI News Review.
