= Talbot Peterson =

American politician

Talbot Peterson was chairman of the Republican Party of Wisconsin.

== Biography ==
A native of Appleton, Wisconsin, Peterson was married with two children. His wife, Evelyn, was Vice Chair of the Outagamie County, Wisconsin Republican Party and the Republican Party of Wisconsin.

== Career ==
Peterson chaired the Republican Party of Wisconsin in 1964. He was also a delegate to the Republican National Convention in 1964 and 1972.
