= The Post-Crescent =

Newspaper in Appleton, Wisconsin

- Type: Daily newspaper
- Format: Broadsheet
- Owner: USA Today Co.
- Publisher: Andy Fisher
- Editor: Taima Kern
- Founded: 1853 (as The Appleton Crescent)
- Headquarters: 306 W. Washington St. Appleton, WI 54911; United States
- Circulation: 14,574 (as of 2022)
- Website: postcrescent.com

The Post-Crescent is a daily newspaper based in Appleton, Wisconsin. Part of the USA Today Co. chain of newspapers, it is primarily distributed in counties surrounding the Appleton/Fox Cities area.

== History ==
The Appleton Crescent was formed in 1853 as a weekly newspaper, the same year that Appleton became a village. The Crescent was a determinedly Democratic newspaper, created by Samuel, James and John Ryan. Edna Ferber, later a famed writer and Pulitzer Prize-winning novelist, became a reporter at the Appleton Crescent at the age of 17 and worked there for about 18 months, approximately 1902–1903.

The Crescent's Jacksonian Democratic politics upset Republicans, and a second newspaper, The Appleton Motor, was formed by F.C. Meade on August 18, 1859. Meade was soon joined by Ryan's brother Francis.

While the two newspapers were bitter rivals, they did cooperate at times. When the Crescent suffered serious damage in 1863 from apparent arson, the Motor ran an article condemning the act. The Motor changed its name to The Appleton Post in 1887 after changing hands several times. The Post's buildings were damaged that year, and donations from the Crescent kept the paper open.

The Appleton Post-Crescent was formed when the Post and the Crescent merged on February 2, 1920. The first paper was published on February 10, 1920. Editors decided to not align with either political party.

The Appleton Post-Crescent decided to purchase the Twin City News-Record, which had been formed when the Menasha Record and the Neenah News Times merged in 1949. The "Appleton" portion of the name was removed in 1964 to reflect that the newspaper reached farther than the city limits.

Publisher V.I. Minahan coined the term "the Fox Cities" in 1953, which is now a common term to describe the metropolitan Appleton area.

== Ownership ==
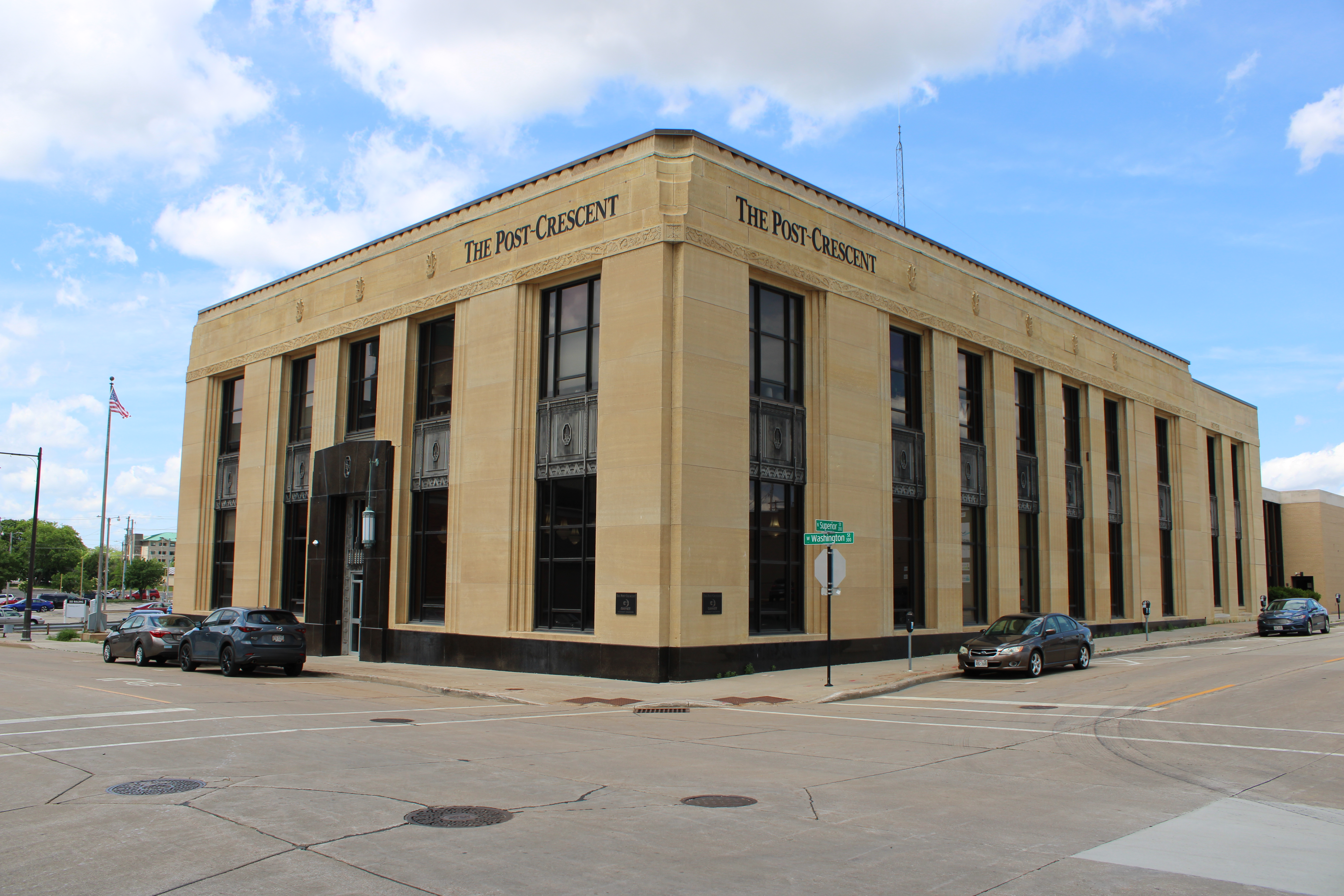
The Appleton Post-Crescent Building

Post Publishing owned the newspaper from 1920 until it was purchased by Gillett Communications on August 1, 1984, and was also a former owner of WLUK (Channel 11) in Green Bay, Wisconsin, Marquette, Michigan's WLUC (Channel 6), WEAU (Channel 13) in Eau Claire, and Rochester, New York's WOKR (Channel 13). Gillett sold the newspaper four months later to Thomson Newspapers, while the television stations were sold to various parties. Thomson owned the paper until it was sold to Gannett on July 21, 2000.

In January 2018, Gannett announced plans to move the Post-Crescent's printing operation from Appleton to Gannett's facility in Milwaukee, a facility closed itself in May 2022, when Gannett shifted the printing operations of its "USA Today Wisconsin" papers to the Journal Star in Peoria, Illinois, with press time moving to the early evening to accommodate the changes; physical Saturday editions of the paper had also ended at the beginning of 2022.

== Circulation ==
The circulation at the 1920 merger was 7,000. It grew to 40,000 by 1960 (when Appleton's population was 48,000). The circulation in 2003 was 53,600 on weekdays, more than 61,000 on Saturdays and nearly 70,000 on Sundays.

== Notable journalists ==
- Mary Agria
- Edna Ferber (Appleton Daily Crescent)
