= Reinhard Schlichting =

19th century American politician

Mayor of Chilton, Wisconsin
- In office April 1887 – April 1889
- Preceded by: Theodore Kersten
- Succeeded by: L. D. Dorschel

Member of the Wisconsin Senate from the 22nd district
- In office January 5, 1874 – January 3, 1876
- Preceded by: George Kreiss
- Succeeded by: James Ryan

District Attorney of Calumet County, Wisconsin
- In office January 7, 1867 – January 4, 1869
- Preceded by: George Baldwin
- Succeeded by: John McMullen

Personal details
- Born: May 23, 1835 Oldenburg, Grand Duchy of Oldenburg, German Confederation
- Died: July 6, 1897 (aged 62) Chilton, Wisconsin, U.S.
- Resting place: Hillside Cemetery, Chilton, Wisconsin
- Party: Democratic
- Spouse: Bertha Fredericka Ida Belitz (m. 1864–1897)
- Children: Herman B. Schlichting^{(b. 1866; died 1920)}; Oscar Schlichting^{(b. 1867; died 1892)}; Jennie (Goessling)^{(b. 1869; died 1938)}; Carl G. Schlichting^{(b. 1871; died 1927)}
- Relatives: Bernard Schlichting (brother)
- Occupation: Hotelier, manufacturer, brewer

Military service
- Allegiance: United States
- Branch/service: United States Volunteers; Union Army
- Years of service: 1861–1865
- Rank: Captain, USV
- Unit: 9th Reg. Wis. Vol. Infantry; 45th Reg. Wis. Vol. Infantry
- Battles/wars: American Civil War

Reinhart Frederick George Schlichting (May 23, 1835 – July 6, 1897) was a German American immigrant, businessman, and Democratic politician. He served two years in the Wisconsin State Senate representing Calumet County and southern Outagamie County. During the American Civil War, he served as a Union Army officer.

== Biography ==
Born in the Oldenburg, in what is now northwest Germany, Schlichting was educated in the Oldenburg city schools until age 12, when he emigrated with his parents to the United States. They immediately settled at Sheboygan Falls, Wisconsin, and Reinhard labored to assist his father in clearing land and establishing a homestead.

During the American Civil War, Schlichting served in the 9th Wisconsin Infantry Regiment and in the 45th Wisconsin Infantry Regiment. After the war, in 1865, he moved to Chilton, Wisconsin, where he purchased a hotel and operated it for the next six years. After selling his hotel, he operated a hub-and-spoke manufacturing business, and then purchased and ran a drug store in Chilton.

He became a leading citizen in Chilton and was elected to several local offices. He was chairman of the town board and served on the school board. In the Fall election of 1866 he was elected district attorney of Calumet County. In 1873 he won election to the Wisconsin State Senate running on the Reform Party ticket, and served in the 1874 and 1875 sessions. In 1887, he was elected mayor of Chilton, and was re-elected without opposition in 1888.

For the last decade of his life, he was employed as the manager of the Calumet County operations of the Pabst Brewing Company. He died of sudden heart failure in his bed at Chilton, Wisconsin.

Wisconsin Senate
Preceded by George Kreiss	Member of the Wisconsin Senate from the 22nd district January 5, 1874 – January 3, 1876	Succeeded by James Ryan
Legal offices
Preceded by George Baldwin	District Attorney of Calumet County, Wisconsin; January 7, 1867 – January 4, 1869	Succeeded by John McMullen
