= Peter Philipps =

American politician

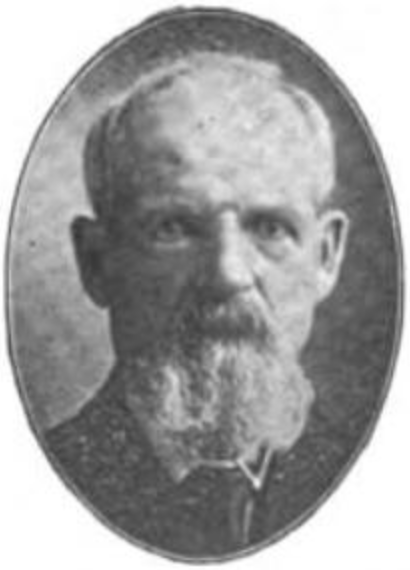

Member of the Wisconsin State Assembly
- In office January 4, 1909 – January 2, 1911
- Preceded by: Simon F. Wehrwein
- Succeeded by: Carl Hansen
- Constituency: Outagamie 2nd District
- In office January 2, 1882 – January 1, 1883
- Preceded by: Thomas Gleeson
- Succeeded by: Joseph Miller
- Constituency: Manitowoc 1st district

Personal details
- Born: June 5, 1835 Geisfeld, Rhine Province, Prussia
- Died: February 17, 1917 (aged 81) Kaukauna, Wisconsin, U.S.
- Party: Republican
- Occupation: farmer, blacksmith

Military service
- Allegiance: United States
- Branch/service: United States Volunteers; Union Army
- Years of service: 1864–1865
- Rank: Sergeant, USV
- Unit: 45th Reg. Wis. Vol. Infantry
- Battles/wars: American Civil War

Peter Philipps (June 5, 1835 – February 17, 1917) was a German American immigrant, blacksmith, and politician. He was a member of the Wisconsin State Assembly for two terms.

== Biography ==
Philipps was born in Geisfeld, then part of the Rhine Province in the Kingdom of Prussia. The Wisconsin Blue Book lists his birthdate as June 5, 1835, but other sources differ. In 1864, during the fourth year of the American Civil War, he was drafted into the Union Army. He was enrolled in Company B of the 45th Wisconsin Infantry Regiment, where he served through the end of the war, rising to the rank of sergeant.

He died at his home in Kaukauna, Wisconsin on February 17, 1917.

== Political career ==
Philipps was first a member of the Assembly in 1882. He was later re-elected in 1908. Other positions Philipps held include mayor of Kaukauna. He was a Republican.
