= Leopold Hammel =

American attorney and politician

District Attorney of Milwaukee County
- In office January 2, 1893 – January 7, 1895
- Preceded by: Clarence S. Brown
- Succeeded by: Alvin C. Brazee

Member of the Wisconsin State Assembly from the Outagamie 1st district
- In office January 5, 1885 – January 7, 1889
- Preceded by: James Campion
- Succeeded by: Louis L. Jabas

Personal details
- Born: August 24, 1858 Rochester, New York, U.S.
- Died: February 26, 1929 (aged 70) Mount Sinai Hospital, Milwaukee, Wisconsin, U.S.
- Cause of death: Heart attack
- Resting place: Greenwood Cemetery, Milwaukee, Wisconsin
- Party: Democratic
- Spouse: Carrie Hammel (m. 1889–1929)
- Relatives: David Hammel (uncle)
- Education: Lawrence University; Columbia Law School

Leopold Hammel (August 24, 1858 – February 26, 1929) was an American lawyer and Democratic politician. He was a prominent lawyer in Milwaukee for nearly 40 years and served as district attorney of Milwaukee County (1893–1895). Earlier in his career, he represented Outagamie County in the Wisconsin State Assembly for four years (1885–1889).

== Biography ==
Born in Rochester, New York, (Note: Hammel's newspaper obituaries incorrectly state that he was born in Appleton. However, various vital records (census, marriage) agree with other biographies that he was born in Rochester.) Hammel moved to Appleton, Wisconsin, in 1866. In 1877, Hammel graduated from Lawrence University and went to the Columbia Law School. Hammel was admitted to the Wisconsin bar and practiced law in Appleton. In 1885 and 1887, Hammel served in the Wisconsin State Assembly and was a Democrat. Later, Hammel moved to Milwaukee, Wisconsin and continued to practice law. Hammel served as district attorney for Milwaukee County, Wisconsin. Hammel died of a heart attack in Milwaukee, Wisconsin.

== Notes ==
Wisconsin State Assembly
Preceded by James Campion	Member of the Wisconsin State Assembly from the Outagamie 1st district January 5, 1885 – January 7, 1889	Succeeded by Louis L. Jabas
Legal offices
Preceded by Clarence S. Brown	District Attorney of Milwaukee County, Wisconsin; January 2, 1893 – January 7, 1895	Succeeded by Alvin C. Brazee
