= David Hammel =

19th century American businessman and politician

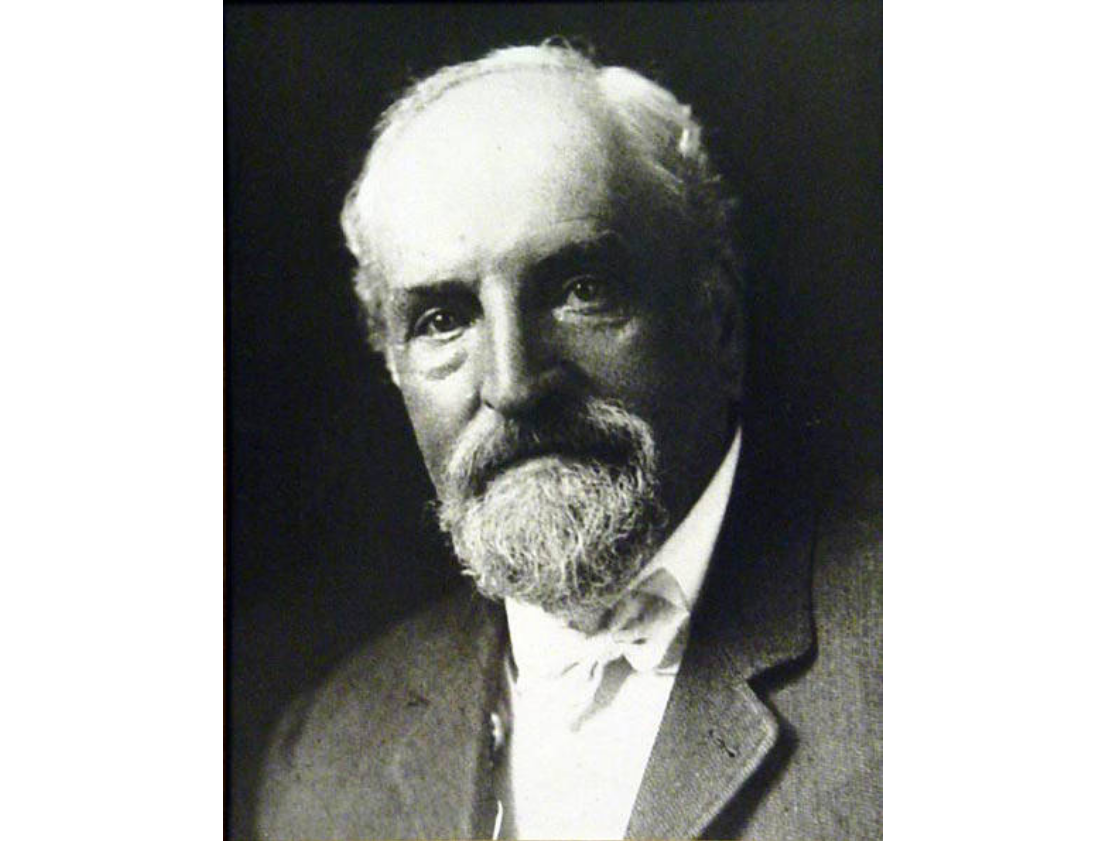

27th and 29th Mayor of Appleton, Wisconsin
- In office April 1906 – April 1908
- Preceded by: Frank W. Harriman
- Succeeded by: Bernard C. Wolter
- In office April 1900 – April 1904
- Preceded by: Herman Erb Jr.
- Succeeded by: Frank W. Harriman

Member of the Wisconsin State Assembly from the Outagamie 1st district
- In office January 3, 1876 – January 7, 1878
- Preceded by: George N. Richmond
- Succeeded by: William Smith Warner

Personal details
- Born: November 26, 1838 Gemünden, Rhine Province, Prussia
- Died: October 13, 1928 (aged 89) Chicago, Illinois, U.S.
- Cause of death: Stroke
- Resting place: Zion Cemetery, Appleton, Wisconsin
- Party: Democratic
- Spouse: Lena Vogel (m. 1861)
- Children: Clara (b. 1868); Leopold (b. 1870; died 1888); Stella (b. 1872); Walter F. (b. 1874); Gertrude (b. 1875); Celia (b. 1878); Samuel H. (b. 1880); Leroy T. (b. 1882)
- Relatives: Leopold Hammel (nephew)

David Hammel (November 26, 1838 – October 13, 1928) was a German American immigrant, businessman, and Democratic politician. He served as the 27th and 29th mayor of Appleton, Wisconsin, and represented Outagamie County in the Wisconsin State Assembly in 1876 and 1877.

== Biography ==
Hammel was born in Gemünden, Rhein-Hunsrück, which was then part of the Rhine Province of the Kingdom of Prussia (modern day Germany). He was educated in the German common schools until 1853, when, at age 14, he emigrated to the United States with his older brother, Jacob. He settled first at Syracuse, New York, and attended school at Ithaca, New York. After leaving school, he remained in Ithaca for several years, working for his brother in dry good sales. In 1857, he moved to Hamilton, Ontario, and started a cigar business, which he operated successfully for several years.

In 1866, he followed the recommendation of some friends to move to Milwaukee, but remained there only briefly before settling permanently at Appleton, Wisconsin. At Appleton, he quickly established a new enterprise as a dealer of work horses, cattle, and oxen, doing business as D. Hammel & Co. He briefly also attempted to run a separate merchant and manufacturing business, but abandoned it after a few years. Later, he became a director and shareholder in the Commercial National Bank in Appleton, and was regarded as one of Appleton's wealthiest residents by 1895.

He was elected on the Democratic ticket to the Wisconsin State Assembly in 1875 and was re-elected in 1876. He also served as a member and treasurer of the local school board.

In 1900, he was elected Mayor of Appleton. He was re-elected to another one-year term in 1901, and was elected to two-year terms in 1902 and 1906.

After leaving office, Hammel moved to Austin, Minnesota, and continued in horse and cattle trading until his health failed. At that point, he moved to Chicago, Illinois, to live with his sons. Hammel died in Chicago as a result of a stroke, in 1928. His body was returned to Appleton and interred at Zion Cemetery.

== Personal life ==
David Hammel was the youngest of nine children born to Peter and Frederika Hammel (née Gamiel). His mother also later emigrated to Appleton, and resided there until her death. He was closely associated in business with his brother, Jacob, throughout much of his life. Jacob's son, Leopold Hammel, also served in the Wisconsin State Assembly. The Hammels were a prominent Jewish family in Wisconsin in their time.

David married Lina Vogel, also an immigrant from Prussia, on January 21, 1861. They had eight children together, though one son died young.

Wisconsin State Assembly
Preceded by George N. Richmond	Member of the Wisconsin State Assembly from the Outagamie 1st district January 3, 1876 – January 7, 1878	Succeeded by William Smith Warner
Political offices
Preceded by Herman Erb Jr.	Mayor of Appleton, Wisconsin; April 1900 – April 1904	Succeeded by Frank W. Harriman
Preceded by Frank W. Harriman	Mayor of Appleton, Wisconsin; April 1906 – April 1908	Succeeded by Bernard C. Wolter
