= John Meek Whitehead =

American politician (1852–1924)

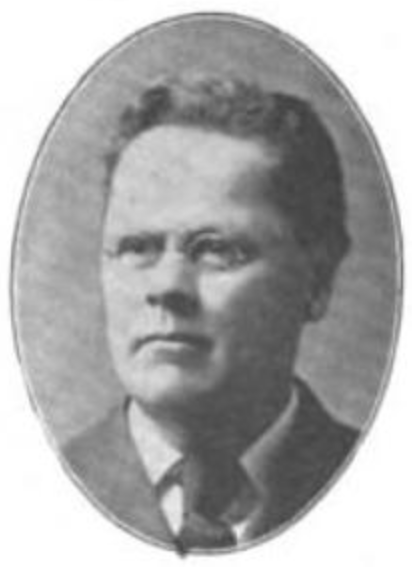

Member of the Wisconsin Senate from the 22nd district
- In office January 4, 1897 – January 6, 1913
- Preceded by: William Kennedy
- Succeeded by: Lawrence E. Cunningham

Personal details
- Born: July 29, 1852 Hillsboro, Illinois, U.S.
- Died: August 31, 1924 (aged 72) Janesville, Wisconsin, U.S.
- Resting place: Oak Hill Cemetery, Janesville
- Party: Republican
- Spouses: Lavinia Fletcher Barrows (m. 1881; died 1888) Julet Claire Thorp (m. 1919)
- Occupation: Lawyer, politician

John Meek Whitehead (July 29, 1852 – August 31, 1924) was an American lawyer and Republican politician from Janesville, Wisconsin. He served 16 years in the Wisconsin Senate, representing Wisconsin's 22nd Senate district from 1897 to 1913.

== Biography ==
Whitehead was born on July 29, 1852, to Jacob and Elizabeth Ann Whitehead near Hillsboro, Illinois. He married twice, first on July 12, 1881, to Lavinia Fletcher Barrows, who died in 1888, and second to Julet Claire Thorp on May 15, 1919. He died in Janesville, Wisconsin, on August 31, 1924.

== Career ==
Whitehead served in the Wisconsin Senate from 1897 to 1913. He was a delegate to the 1920 Republican National Convention.

Wisconsin Senate
Preceded by William Kennedy	Member of the Wisconsin Senate from the 22nd district January 4, 1897 – January 6, 1913	Succeeded by Lawrence E. Cunningham
