= Senator Prentice =

Senator Prentice may refer to:

- Judson Prentice (1810–1886), Wisconsin State Senate
- Margarita Prentice (born 1931), Washington State Senate

== See also ==
- C. J. Prentiss (fl. 1980s–2000s), Ohio State Senate
- Samuel Prentiss (1782–1857), U.S. Senator from Vermont from 1831 to 1842
