= George Kreiss =

American politician (1830–1907)

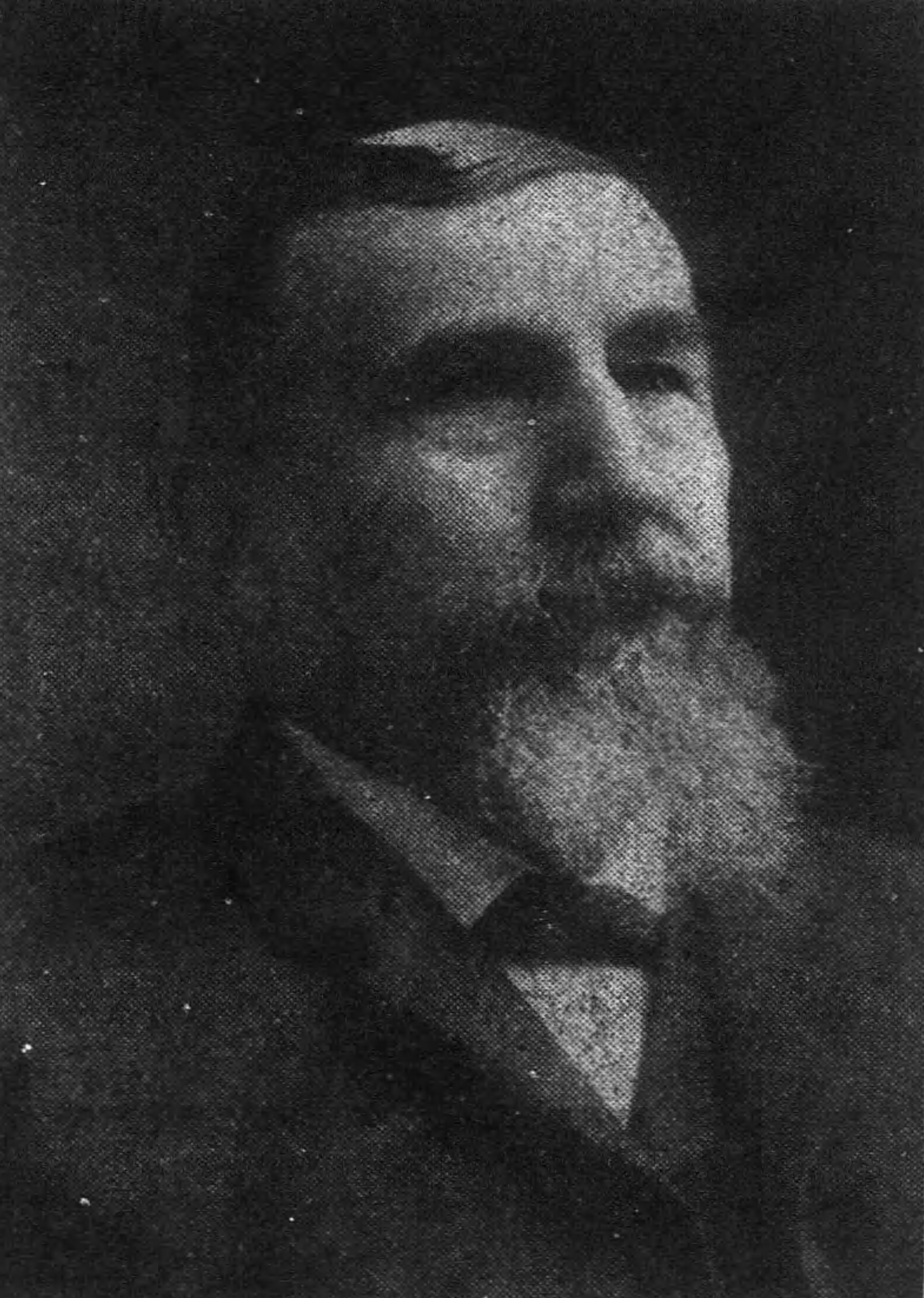
- From Appleton Post obituary

Member of the Wisconsin Senate from the 22nd district
- In office January 1, 1872 – January 5, 1874
- Preceded by: George Baldwin
- Succeeded by: Reinhard Schlichting

Member of the Wisconsin State Assembly from the Outagamie district
- In office January 4, 1864 – January 2, 1865
- Preceded by: Byron Douglas
- Succeeded by: Samuel Ryan Jr.

Personal details
- Born: September 9, 1830 Soultz-Haut-Rhin, Alsace, France
- Died: May 10, 1907 (aged 76) Appleton, Wisconsin, U.S.
- Cause of death: Stroke
- Resting place: Riverside Cemetery, Appleton
- Party: Democratic
- Spouse: Magdelina Weber (m. 1850–1907)
- Children: George M. Kreiss^{(b. 1851; died 1927)}; Albert J. Kreiss^{(b. 1852; died 1931)}; Sarah (Wismer)^{(b. 1856; died 1927)}; Rosa L. Kreiss^{(b. 1860; died 1949)}; Dora S. Kreiss^{(b. 1863; died 1879)}; Fred H. Kreiss^{(b. 1865; died 1907)}; Martha C. Kreiss^{(b. 1868; died 1878)}; Nellie (Brettschneider)^{(b. 1869; died 1940)}
- Occupation: Hotelier, manufacturer

George Kreiss (September 9, 1830 – May 10, 1907) was an Alsatian American immigrant, businessman, and Democratic politician. He was an important figure in the early development of the city of Appleton, Wisconsin, and was a founder of the city's first fire department. He also represented Appleton and surrounding towns in the Wisconsin State Senate and State Assembly.

== Early life ==
George Kriess was born on September 9, 1830, in the town of Soultz-Haut-Rhin, in the Alsace region of France. He emigrated to the United States as a child in 1837. His family settled in Wayne County, New York, where he was raised and educated, and assisted his father in managing their farm.

At age 18, he set out on his own with six dollars. He went to Buffalo, New York, where he boarded a ship to the west. He arrived at Milwaukee, Wisconsin, with three cents remaining, and went to work as a construction laborer. In 1852, while laboring on the construction of the Milwaukee and Lisbon Plank Road, he was badly injured and nearly died. He was subsequently appointed the first toll-gate keeper at the Wauwatosa gate to that road. He held that office for seven years.

== Appleton pioneer ==
He purchased a tract of land near Appleton, Wisconsin, in 1853, and moved there in 1857 with his family. However, since there was no house constructed on the land, they instead rented a house in the city of Appleton for the next four years. In 1861, he constructed the Appleteon House, which became one of the leading hotels of the city.

In the 1860s, he was one of the organizers of Appleton's first fire department. He was chief engineer of the fire department for nine years, and was involved with the fire department in various roles for more than 20 years. He was also an officer in the state fireman's association for several years.

In 1868, he partnered with H. Catlen in a manufacturing business known as the Fox River Hub and Spoke Manufactury. He bought out his partner in 1869, and, in 1870, rented out his hotel in order to give his full attention to his manufacturing business. This continued until 1878, when he resumed management of the hotel. He sold off his factory in 1881, and continued operating the hotel for the rest of his life.

He was one of the charter members of the Appleton Chamber of Commerce, and was elected as vice president in the first officers of that organization.

== Political career ==
Kreiss became affiliated with the Democratic Party of Wisconsin and was elected to the Wisconsin State Assembly in 1863. That same December, he was drafted for service in the Union Army, in the midst of the American Civil War, but paid for a substitute to go in his stead.

In the 1871 redistricting, Appleton's then-district in the Wisconsin State Senate—the 22nd district—was divided. The new 22nd district excluded the sparsely populated northern counties that had previously made up much of the district's territory, reconfigured to contain just the southern half of Outagamie County and neighboring Calumet County. Kreiss ran for the Democratic nomination in the new district, challenging the incumbent George Baldwin, of Calumet County. Kreiss was quite confident with strong support from the Outagamie County delegation, but was defeated at the district convention when one of the Outagamie delegates broke and supported Baldwin. Kreiss decided to launch a campaign as an Independent Democrat and went on to defeat both Baldwin and Republican nominee J. W. Hutchinson in the general election.

Kreiss sought renomination in 1873, but faced another determined challenge from Calumet County. At the district nominating convention, the vote deadlocked for 28 ballots between Kreiss and his challenger, John E. McMullen. Finally, both men decided to withdraw from the race, and the convention delegates agreed to nominate instead Reinhard Schlichting.

Kreiss remained active in the party and served in local offices several more times, but was not a candidate for state office again.

== Personal life and family ==
George Kreiss was the eldest son of Jacob Kreiss and his wife Salina (née Luex). George had at least seven younger brothers. His brother Henry Kreiss—21 years younger than George—followed him to Appleton and served for several years as Outagamie County probate judge.

George Kreiss married Magdelina Weber, another Alsatian American immigrant, in Lyons County, New York, in August 1850. They had nine children together, though two died in infancy and another two died young.

George Kreiss died on May 10, 1907, at his home, the Appleton Hotel, after suffering a stroke a few days before.

== Electoral history ==
=== Wisconsin Assembly (1863) ===
Wisconsin Assembly, Outagamie District Election, 1863
Party	Candidate	Votes	%	±%
General Election, November 3, 1863
Democratic	George Kreiss	939	54.94%	
Republican	George H. Myers	770	45.06%	
Plurality		169	9.89%	
Total votes		1,709	100.0%	
Democratic hold				

=== Wisconsin Senate (1871) ===
Wisconsin Senate, 22nd District Election, 1871
Party	Candidate	Votes	%	±%
General Election, November 7, 1871
Independent Democrat	George Kreiss	1,496	38.60%	
Republican	J. W. Hutchinson	1,435	37.02%	
Democratic	George Baldwin (incumbent)	945	24.38%	
Plurality		61	1.57%	
Total votes		3,876	100.0%	
Democratic hold				

Wisconsin State Assembly
Preceded by Byron Douglas	Member of the Wisconsin State Assembly from the Outagamie district January 4, 1864 – January 2, 1865	Succeeded by Samuel Ryan Jr.
Wisconsin Senate
Preceded by George Baldwin	Member of the Wisconsin Senate from the 22nd district January 1, 1872 – January 5, 1874	Succeeded by Reinhard Schlichting
