= Augustus L. Smith =

American politician

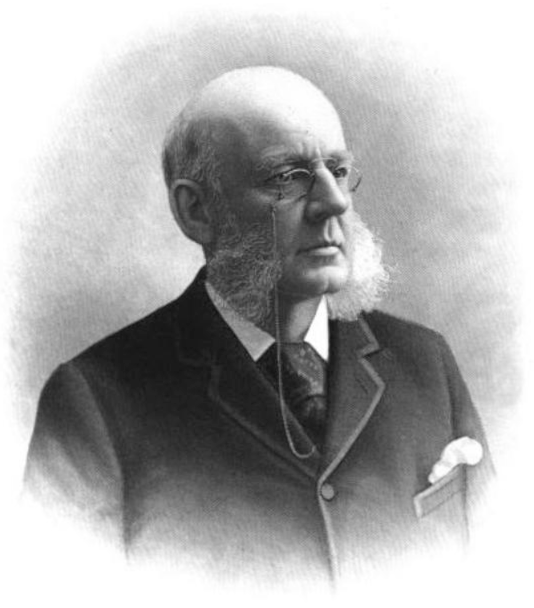

9th Mayor of Appleton, Wisconsin
- In office April 1870 – April 1871
- Preceded by: George N. Richmond
- Succeeded by: George N. Richmond

Member of the Wisconsin Senate from the 22nd district
- In office January 1, 1866 – January 6, 1868
- Preceded by: Joseph Harris
- Succeeded by: William Young

Personal details
- Born: April 5, 1833 Middletown, Connecticut, U.S.
- Died: October 12, 1902 (aged 69) Appleton, Wisconsin, U.S.
- Resting place: Riverside Cemetery, Appleton
- Party: Democratic
- Spouse: Edna Jewett Taylor (m. 1860; died 1894)
- Children: Augustus Ledyard Smith Jr.^{(b. 1862; died 1924)}; Franklin Taylor Smith^{(b. 1864; died 1923)}
- Relatives: A. Ledyard Smith (grandson)
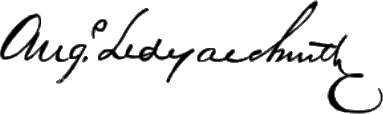
- Signature

Augustus Ledyard Smith Sr. (April 5, 1833 – August 12, 1902) was an American educator, businessman, and Democratic politician from Appleton, Wisconsin. He was the 9th mayor of Appleton, and served two years in the Wisconsin Senate, representing Wisconsin's 22nd Senate district from 1866 to 1868.

The American archaeologist A. Ledyard Smith was his grandson.

== Biography ==
Born in Middletown, Connecticut, Smith graduated from Wesleyan University in 1854. He then taught at University of Wisconsin in Madison, Wisconsin. Smith also taught mathematics at the United States Naval Academy. Smith was the editor of the Fond du Lac Union newspaper for two years. He then served as secretary/treasurer and land agent of the Green Bay and Mississippi Canal Company, later known as the Fox River Improvement Company. Smith lived in Appleton, Wisconsin. In 1866 and 1867, Smith served in the Wisconsin State Senate and was a Democrat. He was appointed regent of the University of Wisconsin. In 1870, Smith served as mayor of Appleton, Wisconsin. He died at his home in Appleton, Wisconsin.

Wisconsin Senate
| Preceded by Joseph Harris | Member of the Wisconsin Senate from the 22nd district January 1, 1866 – January 6, 1868 | Succeeded by William Young |
Political offices
| Preceded by George N. Richmond | Mayor of Appleton, Wisconsin; April 1870 – April 1871 | Succeeded by George N. Richmond |
