= Wisconsin's 22nd Senate district =

American legislative district in southeast Wisconsin

Wisconsin's 22nd State Senate district
- 2024 map defined in 2023 Wisc. Act 94; 2022 map defined in Johnson v. Wisconsin Elections Commission; 2011 map was defined in 2011 Wisc. Act 43 composed of Assembly districts 64, 65, and 66
Senator
Robert Wirch; D–Pleasant Prairie
since January 6, 1997 (29 years, 310 days)
- Demographics: 68.96% White; 12.33% Black; 14.49% Hispanic; 2.52% Asian; 2.12% Native American; 0.13% Hawaiian/Pacific Islander
- Population (2020) • Voting age: 179,562; 139,507
- Website: Official website
- Notes: Southeast Wisconsin

The 22nd Senate district of Wisconsin is one of 33 districts in the Wisconsin Senate. Located in southeast Wisconsin, the district comprises parts of eastern Kenosha County and southeast Racine County, including most of the city of Kenosha and the south side of the city of Racine, along with the villages of Somers and Sturtevant, most of the village of Mount Pleasant, and the northern half of the village of Pleasant Prairie. The district also contains Kenosha Regional Airport, Johnson Wax Headquarters, the Foxconn in Wisconsin industrial park, Regency Mall, Carthage College, and the University of Wisconsin–Parkside campus.

== Current elected officials ==
Robert Wirch is the senator representing the 22nd district. He was first elected to the Senate in the 1996 general election. Before becoming senator, he was a member of the State Assembly from 1993 to 1997.

Each Wisconsin State Senate district is composed of three Wisconsin State Assembly districts. The 22nd Senate district comprises the 64th, 65th, and 66th Assembly districts. The current representatives of those districts are:

- Assembly District 64: Tip McGuire (D–Kenosha)
- Assembly District 65: Ben DeSmidt (D–Kenosha)
- Assembly District 66: Greta Neubauer (D–Racine)

The district is also located entirely within Wisconsin's 1st congressional district, which is represented by U.S. Representative Bryan Steil.

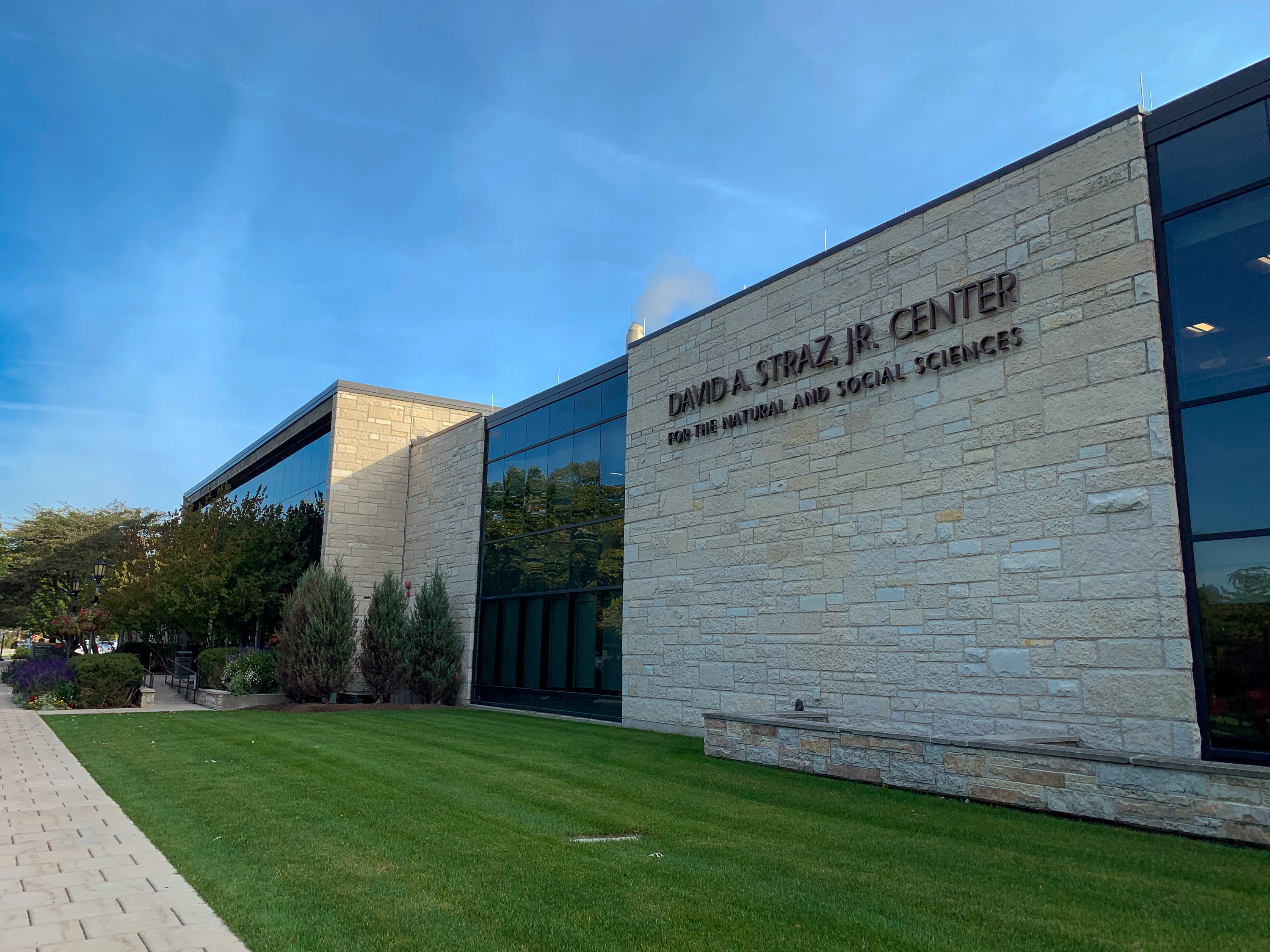
Straz Center at Carthage College

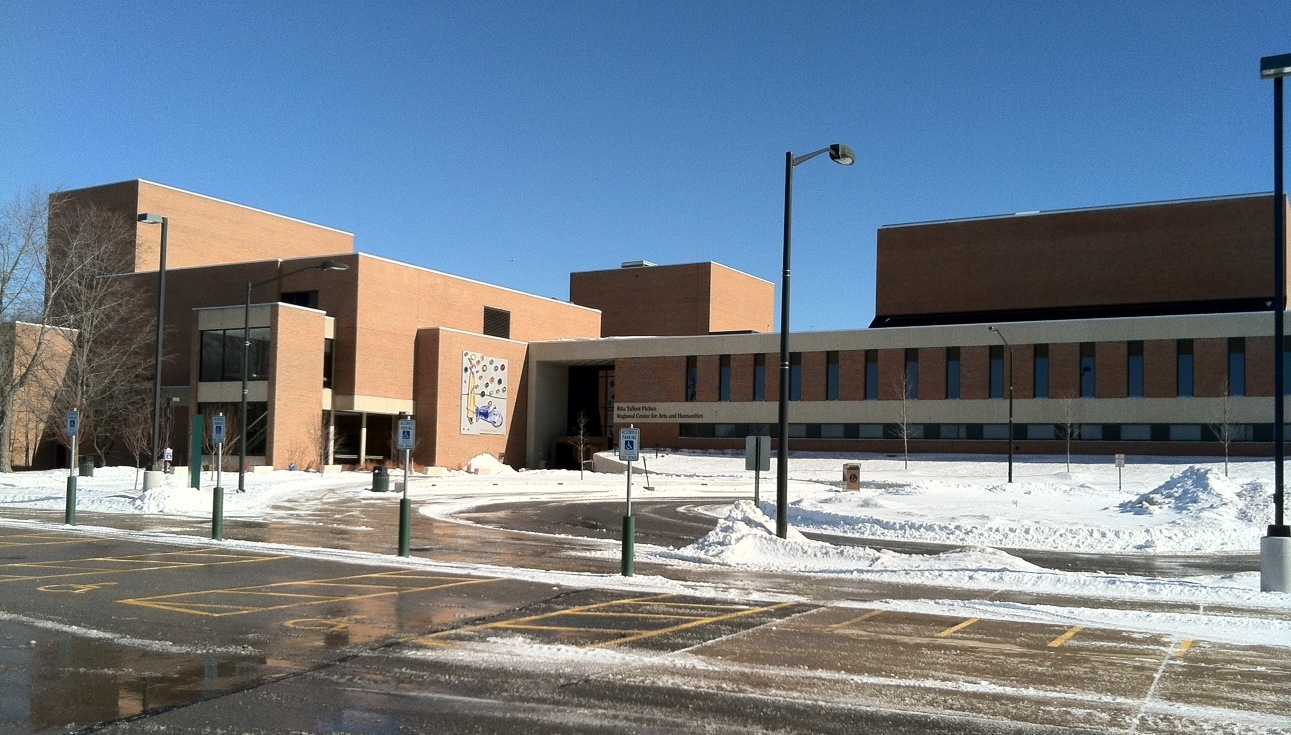
Rita Tallent Picken Regional Center on the University of Wisconsin–Parkside campus

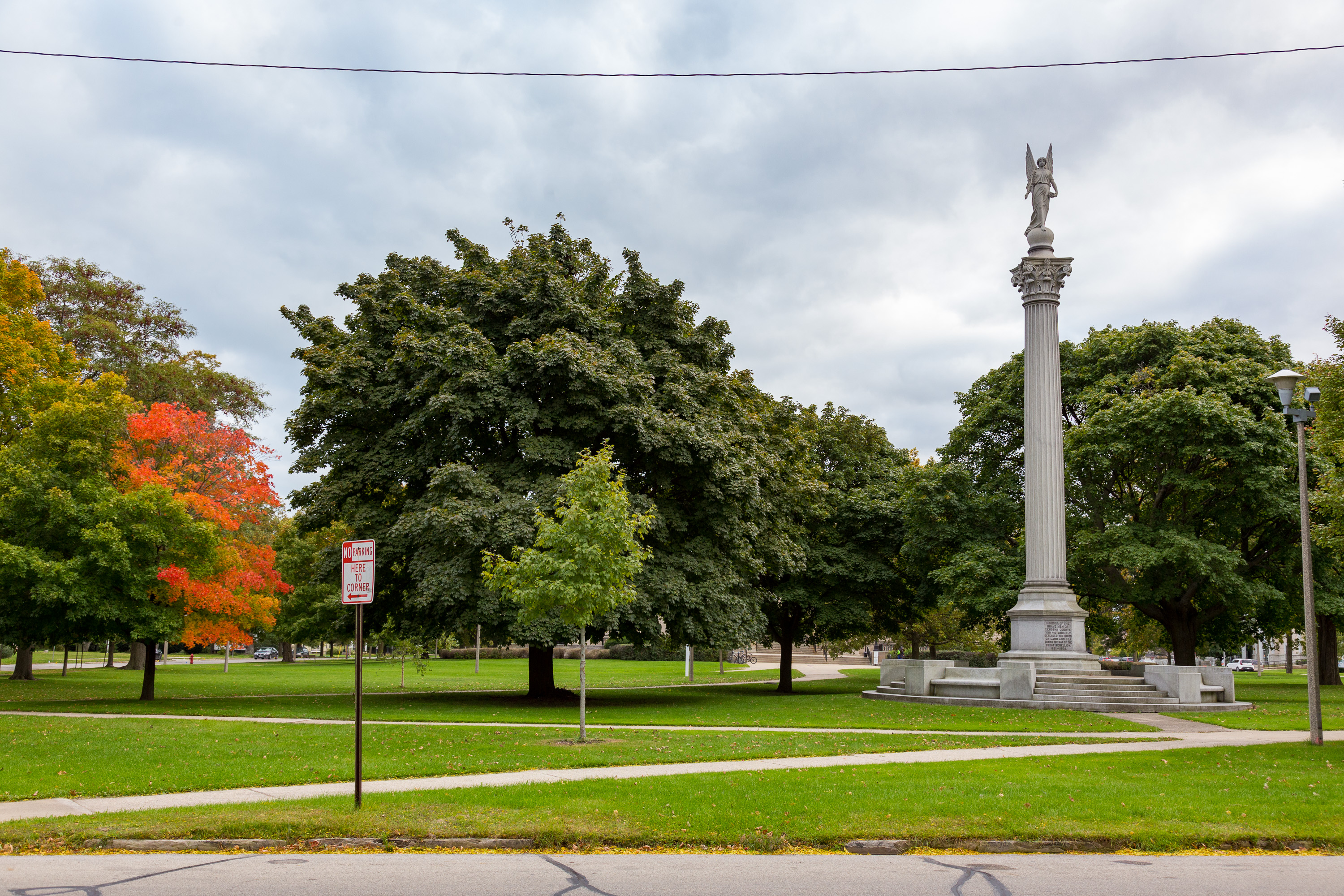
Soldiers' Monument in Library Park

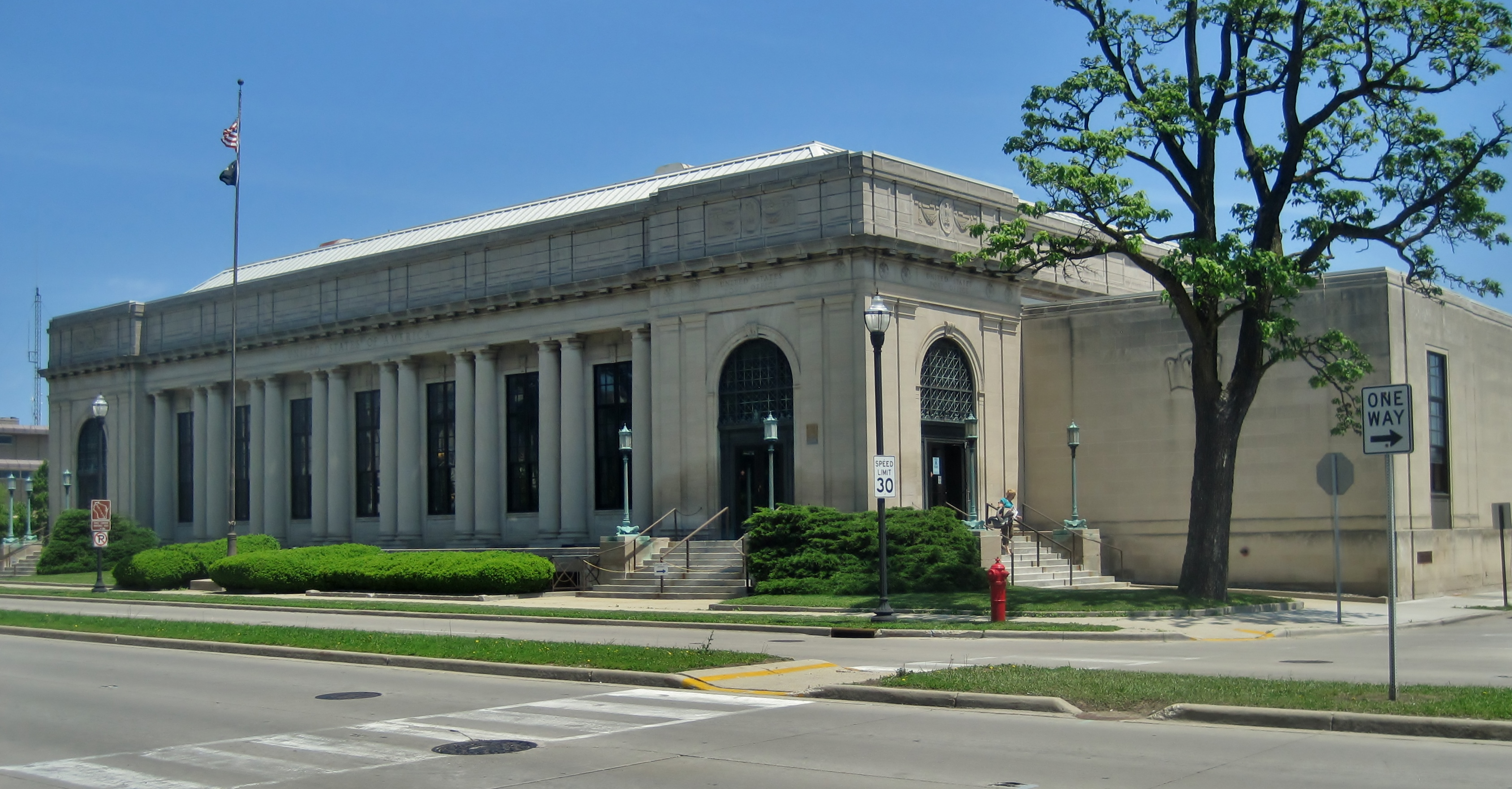
Civic Center Historic District

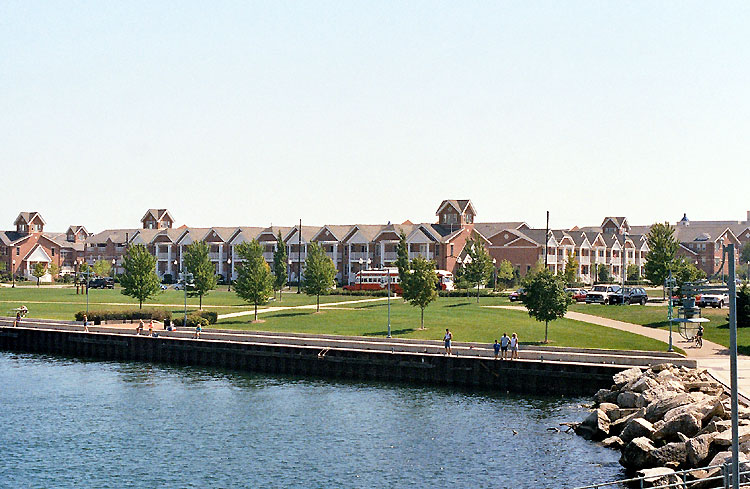
Harbor Park

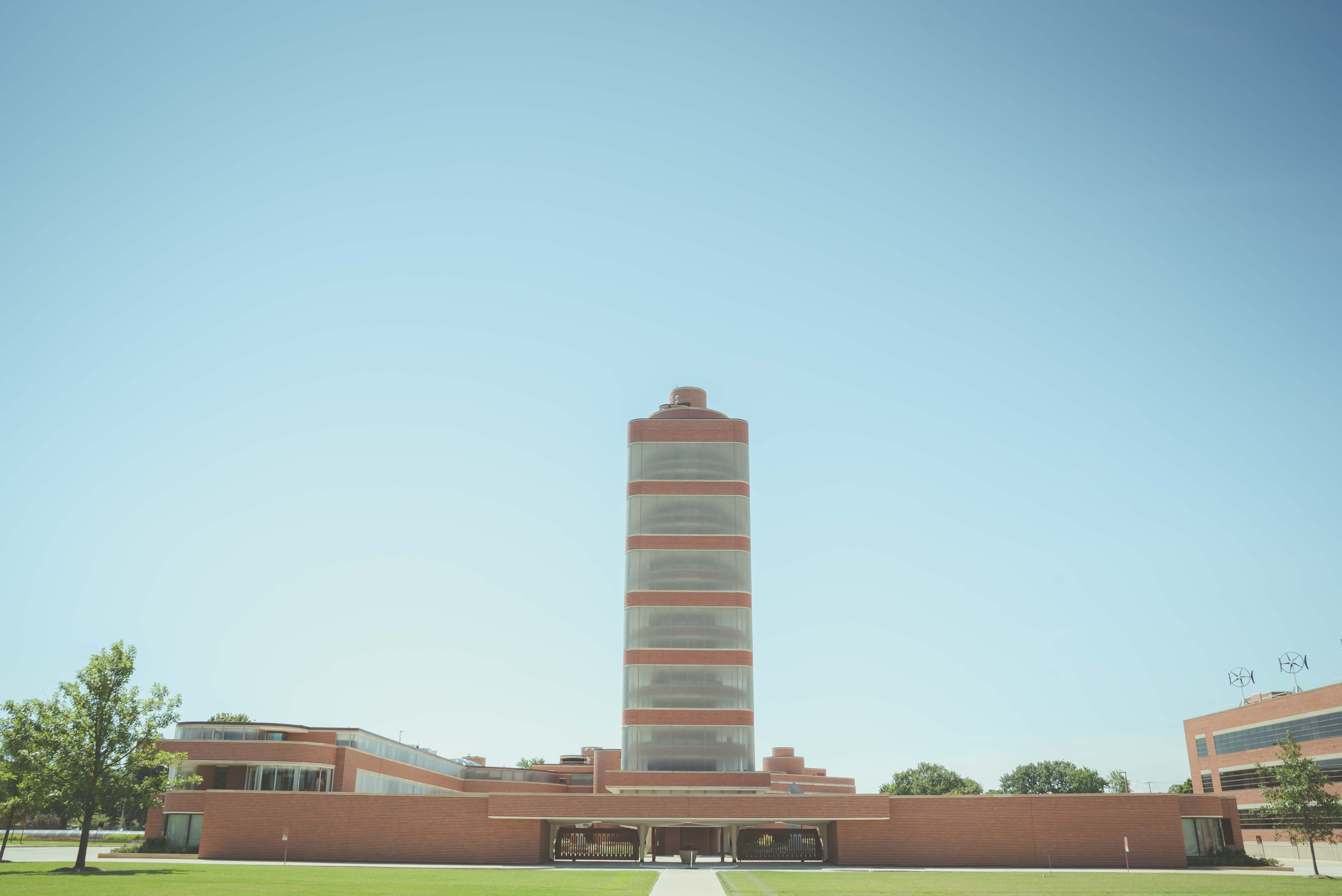
Johnson Wax Headquarters in Racine

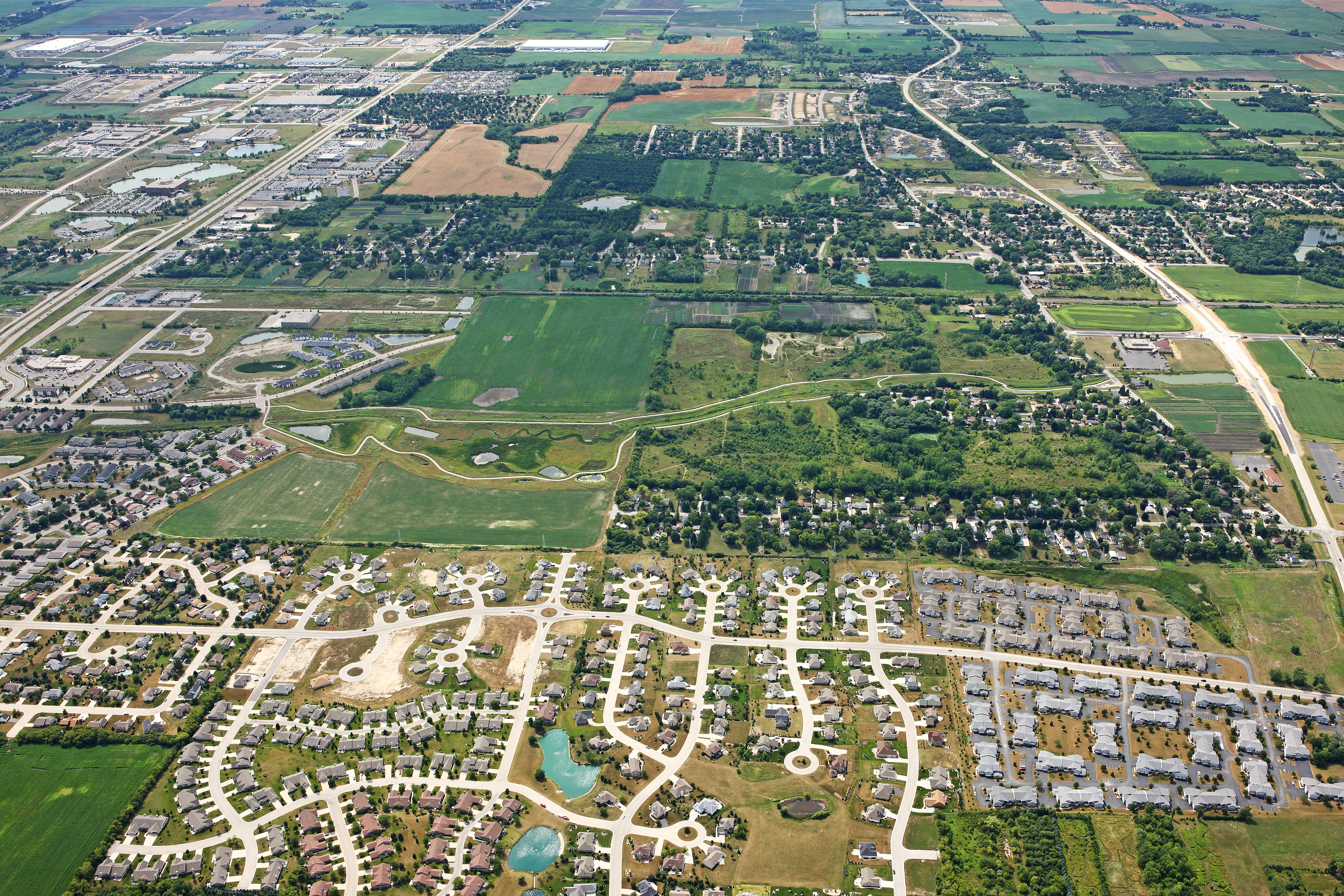
Aerial view of Mount Pleasant

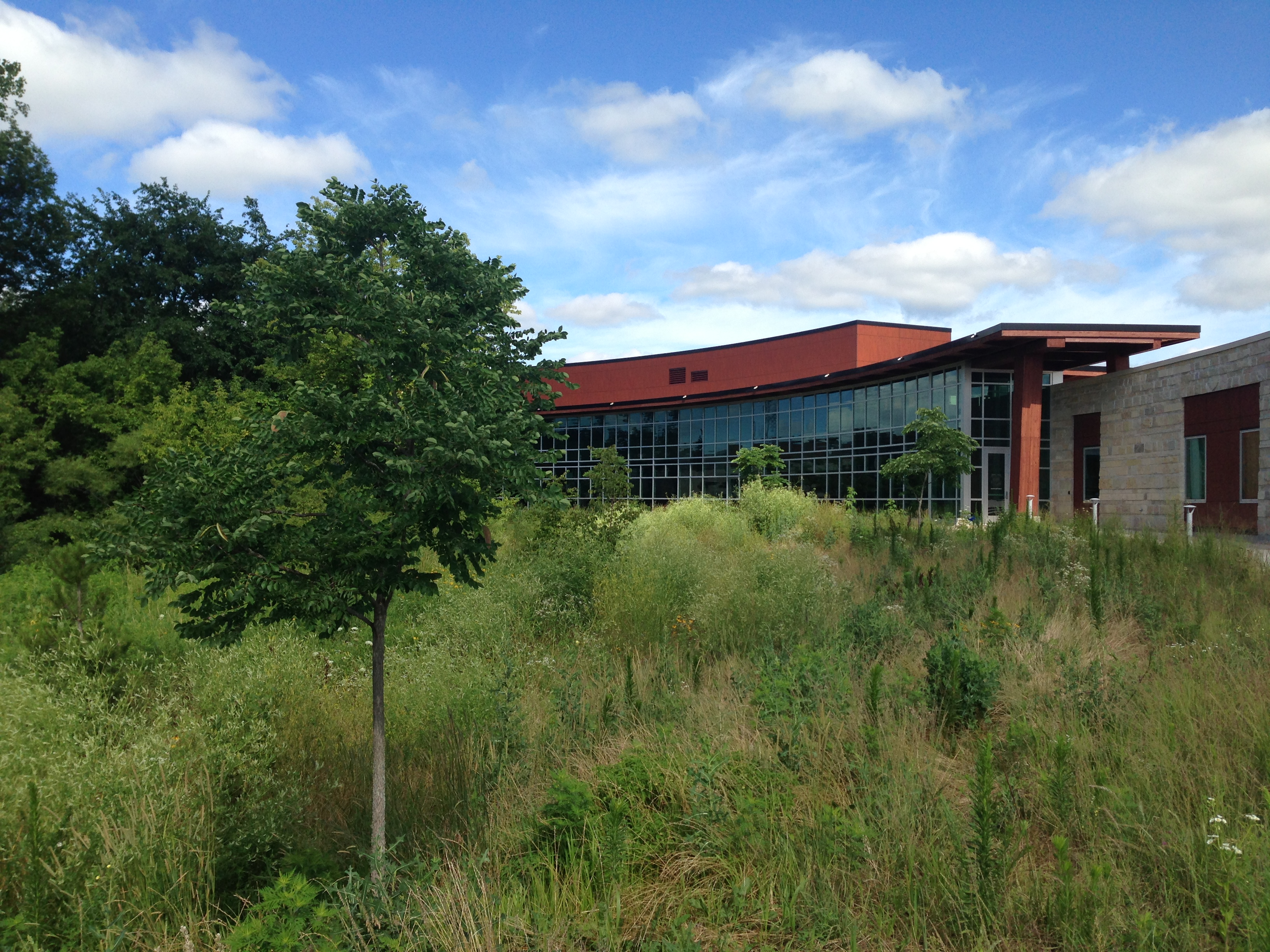
Mount Pleasant Village Hall

== Past senators ==
A partial list of all previous senators from this district:

Note: the boundaries of districts have changed repeatedly over history. Previous politicians of a specific numbered district have represented a completely different geographic area, due to redistricting.

Senator	Party	Notes	Session	Years	District Definition
District created by 1852 Wisc. Act 499.				1852	1852–1856 1856–1860; Dodge County
Judson Prentice	Whig		6th	1853	1852–1856 1856–1860; Dodge County
Ezra A. Bowen	Dem.		7th	1854	1852–1856 1856–1860; Dodge County
Ezra A. Bowen	Dem.		8th	1855	1852–1856 1856–1860; Dodge County
S. L. Rose	Dem.		9th	1856	1852–1856 1856–1860; Dodge County
S. L. Rose	Dem.		10th	1857	1852–1856 1856–1860; Dodge County
William E. Smith	Rep.		11th	1858	1852–1856 1856–1860; Dodge County
William E. Smith	Rep.		12th	1859	1852–1856 1856–1860; Dodge County
Benjamin Ferguson	Dem.		13th	1860	1852–1856 1856–1860; Dodge County
Benjamin Ferguson	Dem.		14th	1861	1852–1856 1856–1860; Dodge County
Thomas R. Hudd	Dem.		15th	1862	Outagamie, Shawano, Oconto, and Door Counties
Thomas R. Hudd	Dem.		16th	1863	Outagamie, Shawano, Oconto, and Door Counties
Joseph Harris	Natl. Union		17th	1864	Outagamie, Shawano, Oconto, and Door Counties
Joseph Harris	Natl. Union		18th	1865	Outagamie, Shawano, Oconto, and Door Counties
Augustus L. Smith	Dem.		19th	1866	Outagamie, Shawano, Oconto, and Door Counties
Augustus L. Smith	Dem.		20th	1867	Outagamie, Calumet, Oconto, and Shawano Counties
William Young	Dem.		21st	1868	Outagamie, Calumet, Oconto, and Shawano Counties
William Young	Dem.		22nd	1869	Outagamie, Calumet, Oconto, and Shawano Counties
George Baldwin	Dem.		23rd	1870	Outagamie, Calumet, Oconto, and Shawano Counties
George Baldwin	Dem.		24th	1871	Outagamie, Calumet, Oconto, and Shawano Counties
George Kreiss	Dem.		25th	1872	Calumet County and parts of Outagamie County: The towns of Buchanan, Dale, Center, Freedom, Grand Chute, Greenville, and Kaukauna, and the city of Appleton
George Kreiss	Dem.		26th	1873	Calumet County and parts of Outagamie County: The towns of Buchanan, Dale, Center, Freedom, Grand Chute, Greenville, and Kaukauna, and the city of Appleton
Reinhard Schlichting	Ref.		27th	1874	Calumet County and parts of Outagamie County: The towns of Buchanan, Dale, Center, Freedom, Grand Chute, Greenville, and Kaukauna, and the city of Appleton
Reinhard Schlichting	Ref.		28th	1875	Calumet County and parts of Outagamie County: The towns of Buchanan, Dale, Center, Freedom, Grand Chute, Greenville, and Kaukauna, and the city of Appleton
James Ryan	Dem.		29th	1876	Calumet County and parts of Outagamie County: The towns of Buchanan, Dale, Center, Freedom, Grand Chute, Greenville, and Kaukauna, and the city of Appleton
James Ryan	Dem.		30th	1877	1876–1881 1882–1887; Calumet and Outagamie Counties
George N. Richmond	Dem.		31st	1878	1876–1881 1882–1887; Calumet and Outagamie Counties
George N. Richmond	Dem.		32nd	1879	1876–1881 1882–1887; Calumet and Outagamie Counties
Benjamin F. Carter	Dem.		33rd	1880	1876–1881 1882–1887; Calumet and Outagamie Counties
Benjamin F. Carter	Dem.		34th	1881	1876–1881 1882–1887; Calumet and Outagamie Counties
John L. Pingel	Dem.		35th	1882	1876–1881 1882–1887; Calumet and Outagamie Counties
John L. Pingel	Dem.		36th	1883–1884	1876–1881 1882–1887; Calumet and Outagamie Counties
William Kennedy	Dem.		37th	1885–1886	1876–1881 1882–1887; Calumet and Outagamie Counties
William Kennedy	Dem.		38th	1887–1888	1876–1881 1882–1887; Calumet and Outagamie Counties
William Kennedy	Dem.		39th	1889–1890	Outagamie County and parts of Winnebago County: The town of Menasha and the city of Menasha
William Kennedy	Dem.		40th	1891–1892	Outagamie County and parts of Winnebago County: The town of Menasha and the city of Menasha
William Kennedy	Dem.		41st	1893–1894	Outagamie County and parts of Waupaca County: The towns of Union, Bear Creek, Lebanon, Royalton, Mukwa, Caledonia, Larrabee, Matteson, and Little Wolf, and the city of New London
William Kennedy	Dem.		42nd	1895–1896	Outagamie County and parts of Waupaca County: The towns of Union, Bear Creek, Lebanon, Royalton, Mukwa, Caledonia, Larrabee, Matteson, and Little Wolf, and the city of New London
John Meek Whitehead	Rep.		43rd	1897-1898	Western Jefferson County and northern Rock County: Jefferson County; Town of Aztalan; Town of Jefferson; Town of Koshkonong; Town of Lake Mills; Town of Milford; Town of Oakland; Town of Sumner; Town of Waterloo; City of Fort Atkinson; City of Jefferson; Rock County; Town of Bradford; Town of Center; Town of Fulton; Town of Harmony; Town of Janesville; Town of Johnstown; Town of Lima; Town of La Prairie; Town of Magnolia; Town of Milton; Town of Porter; Town of Rock; Town of Union; Village of Evansville (later city); City of Edgerton; City of Janesville
John Meek Whitehead	Rep.		44th	1899–1900	
John Meek Whitehead	Rep.		45th	1901–1902	
John Meek Whitehead	Rep.		46th	1903–1904	Rock County
John Meek Whitehead	Rep.		47th	1905–1906	Rock County
John Meek Whitehead	Rep.		48th	1907–1908	Rock County
John Meek Whitehead	Rep.		49th	1909–1910	Rock County
John Meek Whitehead	Rep.		50th	1911–1912	Rock County
Lawrence E. Cunningham	Rep.		51st	1913-1914	Rock and Walworth Counties
Lawrence E. Cunningham	Rep.		52nd	1915–1916	Rock and Walworth Counties
Lawrence E. Cunningham	Rep.		53rd	1917–1918	Rock and Walworth Counties
Lawrence E. Cunningham	Rep.		54th	1919–1920	Rock and Walworth Counties
Eldo T. Ridgway	Rep.		55th	1921-1922	Rock and Walworth Counties
Eldo T. Ridgway	Rep.		56th	1923–1924	Kenosha and Walworth Counties
George W. Hull	Rep.		57th	1925-1926	Kenosha and Walworth Counties
George W. Hull	Rep.		58th	1927–1928	Kenosha and Walworth Counties
Conrad Shearer	Rep.		59th	1929-1930	Kenosha and Walworth Counties
Conrad Shearer	Rep.		60th	1931–1932	Kenosha and Walworth Counties
Conrad Shearer	Rep.		61st	1933–1934	Kenosha and Walworth Counties
Conrad Shearer	Rep.		62nd	1935–1936	Kenosha and Walworth Counties
Conrad Shearer	Rep.		63rd	1937–1938	Kenosha and Walworth Counties
Conrad Shearer	Rep.		64th	1939–1940	Kenosha and Walworth Counties
Conrad Shearer	Rep.		65th	1941–1942	Kenosha and Walworth Counties
Conrad Shearer	Rep.		66th	1943–1944	Kenosha and Walworth Counties
Conrad Shearer	Rep.		67th	1945–1946	Kenosha and Walworth Counties
Conrad Shearer	Rep.		68th	1947–1948	Kenosha and Walworth Counties
William Trinke	Rep.		69th	1949-1950	Kenosha and Walworth Counties
William Trinke	Rep.		70th	1951–1952	Kenosha and Walworth Counties
William Trinke	Rep.		71st	1953–1954	Kenosha and Walworth Counties
William Trinke	Rep.		72nd	1955–1956	Kenosha and Walworth Counties
William Trinke	Rep.		73rd	1957–1958	Kenosha and Walworth Counties
William Trinke	Rep.		74th	1959–1960	Kenosha and Walworth Counties
Earl D. Morton	Rep.		75th	1961–1962	Kenosha and Walworth Counties
Earl D. Morton	Rep.		76th	1963–1964	Kenosha and Walworth Counties
Joseph Lourigan	Dem.		77th	1965–1966	Kenosha County
Joseph Lourigan	Dem.		78th	1967–1968	Kenosha County
Joseph Lourigan	Dem.		79th	1969–1970	Kenosha County
Joseph Lourigan	Dem.		80th	1971–1972	Kenosha County
Doug La Follette	Dem.	Won 1972 election. Resigned 1974 after elected Wisconsin Secretary of State.	81st	1973–1974	Kenosha County and parts of Central Racine County: The towns of Dover, Raymond, and Yorkville, and the village of Union Grove; and parts of Southeast Walworth County: The town of Bloomfield and the village of Genoa City
--Vacant--			82nd	1975–1976	Kenosha County and parts of Central Racine County: The towns of Dover, Raymond, and Yorkville, and the village of Union Grove; and parts of Southeast Walworth County: The town of Bloomfield and the village of Genoa City
John J. Maurer	Dem.	Won 1975 special election. Re-elected 1976, 1980. Appointed Wisconsin Secretary of Veterans Affairs 1985.	82nd	1975–1976	Kenosha County and parts of Central Racine County: The towns of Dover, Raymond, and Yorkville, and the village of Union Grove; and parts of Southeast Walworth County: The town of Bloomfield and the village of Genoa City
John J. Maurer	Dem.	Won 1975 special election. Re-elected 1976, 1980. Appointed Wisconsin Secretary of Veterans Affairs 1985.	83rd	1977–1978	Kenosha County and parts of Central Racine County: The towns of Dover, Raymond, and Yorkville, and the village of Union Grove; and parts of Southeast Walworth County: The town of Bloomfield and the village of Genoa City
John J. Maurer	Dem.	Won 1975 special election. Re-elected 1976, 1980. Appointed Wisconsin Secretary of Veterans Affairs 1985.	84th	1979–1980	Kenosha County and parts of Central Racine County: The towns of Dover, Raymond, and Yorkville, and the village of Union Grove; and parts of Southeast Walworth County: The town of Bloomfield and the village of Genoa City
John J. Maurer	Dem.	Won 1975 special election. Re-elected 1976, 1980. Appointed Wisconsin Secretary of Veterans Affairs 1985.	85th	1981–1982	Kenosha County and parts of Central Racine County: The towns of Dover, Raymond, and Yorkville, and the village of Union Grove; and parts of Southeast Walworth County: The town of Bloomfield and the village of Genoa City
John J. Maurer	Dem.	Won 1975 special election. Re-elected 1976, 1980. Appointed Wisconsin Secretary of Veterans Affairs 1985.	86th	1983–1984	Kenosha County, part of Southwest Racine County: The town of Burlington, and the city of Burlington; and parts of Southeast Walworth County: The town of Bloomfield and the village of Genoa City
Joseph F. Andrea	Dem.	Won 1984 election. Re-elected 1988, 1992. Did not seek re-election 1996.	87th	1985–1986	Kenosha County, part of Southwest Racine County: The town of Burlington, and the city of Burlington; and parts of Southeast Walworth County: The town of Bloomfield and the village of Genoa City
Joseph F. Andrea	Dem.	Won 1984 election. Re-elected 1988, 1992. Did not seek re-election 1996.	88th	1987–1988	Kenosha County, part of Southwest Racine County: The town of Burlington, and the city of Burlington; and parts of Southeast Walworth County: The town of Bloomfield and the village of Genoa City
Joseph F. Andrea	Dem.	Won 1984 election. Re-elected 1988, 1992. Did not seek re-election 1996.	89th	1989–1990	Kenosha County, part of Southwest Racine County: The town of Burlington, and the city of Burlington; and parts of Southeast Walworth County: The town of Bloomfield and the village of Genoa City
Joseph F. Andrea	Dem.	Won 1984 election. Re-elected 1988, 1992. Did not seek re-election 1996.	90th	1991–1992	Kenosha County, part of Southwest Racine County: The town of Burlington, and the city of Burlington; and parts of Southeast Walworth County: The town of Bloomfield and the village of Genoa City
Joseph F. Andrea	Dem.	Won 1984 election. Re-elected 1988, 1992. Did not seek re-election 1996.	91st	1993–1994	Kenosha County, parts of Southwest Racine County: Wards 2, 3, 4, 5, 8, 9, 10, 11, and 12 in the town of Burlington, and wards 6, 8, 9, 10, 11, 12, and 13 in the city of Burlington; and parts of Southeast Walworth County: The town of Bloomfield, ward 7 of the town of Geneva, the village of Genoa City, and the city of Lake Geneva
Joseph F. Andrea	Dem.	Won 1984 election. Re-elected 1988, 1992. Did not seek re-election 1996.	92nd	1995–1996	Kenosha County, parts of Southwest Racine County: Wards 2, 3, 4, 5, 8, 9, 10, 11, and 12 in the town of Burlington, and wards 6, 8, 9, 10, 11, 12, and 13 in the city of Burlington; and parts of Southeast Walworth County: The town of Bloomfield, ward 7 of the town of Geneva, the village of Genoa City, and the city of Lake Geneva
Robert Wirch	Dem.	Won 1996 election. Re-elected 2000, 2004, 2008. Survived 2011 recall election. Re-elected 2012, 2016, 2020, 2024.	93rd	1997–1998	Kenosha County, parts of Southwest Racine County: Wards 2, 3, 4, 5, 8, 9, 10, 11, and 12 in the town of Burlington, and wards 6, 8, 9, 10, 11, 12, and 13 in the city of Burlington; and parts of Southeast Walworth County: The town of Bloomfield, ward 7 of the town of Geneva, the village of Genoa City, and the city of Lake Geneva
Robert Wirch	Dem.	Won 1996 election. Re-elected 2000, 2004, 2008. Survived 2011 recall election. Re-elected 2012, 2016, 2020, 2024.	94th	1999–2000	Kenosha County, parts of Southwest Racine County: Wards 2, 3, 4, 5, 8, 9, 10, 11, and 12 in the town of Burlington, and wards 6, 8, 9, 10, 11, 12, and 13 in the city of Burlington; and parts of Southeast Walworth County: The town of Bloomfield, ward 7 of the town of Geneva, the village of Genoa City, and the city of Lake Geneva
Robert Wirch	Dem.	Won 1996 election. Re-elected 2000, 2004, 2008. Survived 2011 recall election. Re-elected 2012, 2016, 2020, 2024.	95th	2001–2002	Kenosha County, parts of Southwest Racine County: Wards 2, 3, 4, 5, 8, 9, 10, 11, and 12 in the town of Burlington, and wards 6, 8, 9, 10, 11, 12, and 13 in the city of Burlington; and parts of Southeast Walworth County: The town of Bloomfield, ward 7 of the town of Geneva, the village of Genoa City, and the city of Lake Geneva
Robert Wirch	Dem.	Won 1996 election. Re-elected 2000, 2004, 2008. Survived 2011 recall election. Re-elected 2012, 2016, 2020, 2024.	96th	2003–2004	most of Kenosha County: The towns of Brighton, Bristol, Paris, Salem, Somers, and Randall, the villages of Paddock Lake, Pleasant Prairie, Silver Lake, and Twin Lakes, and the city of Kenosha; and part of Southwest Racine County: The town of Burlington, and the city of Burlington
Robert Wirch	Dem.	Won 1996 election. Re-elected 2000, 2004, 2008. Survived 2011 recall election. Re-elected 2012, 2016, 2020, 2024.	97th	2005–2006	most of Kenosha County: The towns of Brighton, Bristol, Paris, Salem, Somers, and Randall, the villages of Paddock Lake, Pleasant Prairie, Silver Lake, and Twin Lakes, and the city of Kenosha; and part of Southwest Racine County: The town of Burlington, and the city of Burlington
Robert Wirch	Dem.	Won 1996 election. Re-elected 2000, 2004, 2008. Survived 2011 recall election. Re-elected 2012, 2016, 2020, 2024.	98th	2007–2008	most of Kenosha County: The towns of Brighton, Bristol, Paris, Salem, Somers, and Randall, the villages of Paddock Lake, Pleasant Prairie, Silver Lake, and Twin Lakes, and the city of Kenosha; and part of Southwest Racine County: The town of Burlington, and the city of Burlington
Robert Wirch	Dem.	Won 1996 election. Re-elected 2000, 2004, 2008. Survived 2011 recall election. Re-elected 2012, 2016, 2020, 2024.	99th	2009–2010	most of Kenosha County: The towns of Brighton, Bristol, Paris, Salem, Somers, and Randall, the villages of Paddock Lake, Pleasant Prairie, Silver Lake, and Twin Lakes, and the city of Kenosha; and part of Southwest Racine County: The town of Burlington, and the city of Burlington
Robert Wirch	Dem.	Won 1996 election. Re-elected 2000, 2004, 2008. Survived 2011 recall election. Re-elected 2012, 2016, 2020, 2024.	100th	2011–2012	most of Kenosha County: The towns of Brighton, Bristol, Paris, Salem, Somers, and Randall, the villages of Paddock Lake, Pleasant Prairie, Silver Lake, and Twin Lakes, and the city of Kenosha; and part of Southwest Racine County: The town of Burlington, and the city of Burlington
Robert Wirch	Dem.	Won 1996 election. Re-elected 2000, 2004, 2008. Survived 2011 recall election. Re-elected 2012, 2016, 2020, 2024.	101st	2013–2014	parts of Eastern Kenosha County: The village of Somers and the city of Kenosha; and part of Eastern Racine County: the city of Racine
Robert Wirch	Dem.	Won 1996 election. Re-elected 2000, 2004, 2008. Survived 2011 recall election. Re-elected 2012, 2016, 2020, 2024.	102nd	2015–2016	parts of Eastern Kenosha County: The village of Somers and the city of Kenosha; and part of Eastern Racine County: the city of Racine
Robert Wirch	Dem.	Won 1996 election. Re-elected 2000, 2004, 2008. Survived 2011 recall election. Re-elected 2012, 2016, 2020, 2024.	103rd	2017–2018	parts of Eastern Kenosha County: The village of Somers and the city of Kenosha; and part of Eastern Racine County: the city of Racine
Robert Wirch	Dem.	Won 1996 election. Re-elected 2000, 2004, 2008. Survived 2011 recall election. Re-elected 2012, 2016, 2020, 2024.	104th	2019–2020	parts of Eastern Kenosha County: The village of Somers and the city of Kenosha; and part of Eastern Racine County: the city of Racine
Robert Wirch	Dem.	Won 1996 election. Re-elected 2000, 2004, 2008. Survived 2011 recall election. Re-elected 2012, 2016, 2020, 2024.	105th	2021–2022	parts of Eastern Kenosha County: The village of Somers and the city of Kenosha; and part of Eastern Racine County: the city of Racine
Robert Wirch	Dem.	Won 1996 election. Re-elected 2000, 2004, 2008. Survived 2011 recall election. Re-elected 2012, 2016, 2020, 2024.	106th	2023–2024	Northeast Kenosha County, southeast Racine County
Robert Wirch	Dem.	Won 1996 election. Re-elected 2000, 2004, 2008. Survived 2011 recall election. Re-elected 2012, 2016, 2020, 2024.	107th	2025–2026	Eastern Kenosha County southeast Racine County
