= Chutixtiox =

Archaeological site in Guatemala

- Xutixtiox, Chu'Taxtyoox
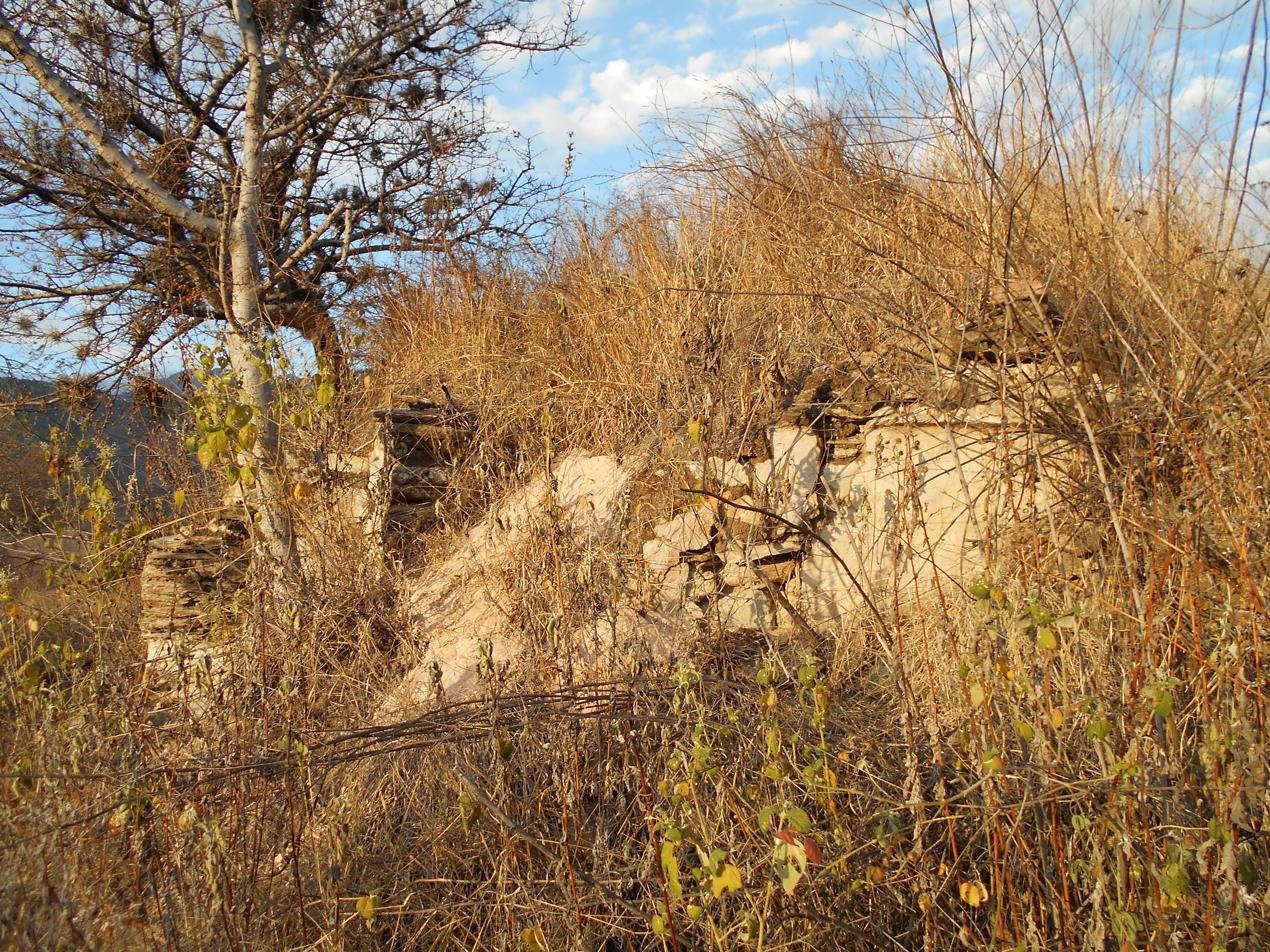
- Shrine on the main plaza at Chutixtiox
- Interactive map of Chutixtiox
- 15°16′28.2″N 91°7′21.72″W
- Periods: Postclassic
- Cultures: Maya civilization
- Location: Sacapulas
- Region: Quiché Department, Guatemala

Site notes
- Architectural style: Postclassic Maya
- Excavation dates: 1955
- Archaeologists: A. Ledyard Smith

Chutixtiox (alternatively spelled Xutixtiox, or Chu'Taxtyoox in the Sakapultek language) is an archaeological site of the ancient Maya civilization near Sacapulas, in the Quiché department of modern Guatemala. The site was excavated during the 20th century by A. Ledyard Smith. Ceramic evidence excavated at the site suggests a close relationship with the K'iche' capital of Q'umarkaj. Chutixtiox may have been a settlement in a polity that included the nearby sites of Chutinamit and Xolpacol.

The site has been dated to the Late Postclassic period and shows two distinct architectural phases, with the late phase demonstrating close similarity to the central K'iche' region around Q'umarkaj. This matches ethnohistoric documents that describe an early 15th-century conquest of the region by the central K'iche'. The site has been identified as the settlement of the Kumatz group, described as migrating to the area in the Popul Vuh.

== Location ==
The site is located on a high ridge in an area later dominated by the K'iche' Maya. The ridge overlooks an agricultural valley of the Río Negro. The site was heavily fortified and may have been a settlement of the Postclassic K'iche', used to control the valley. Chutixtiox is 3 kilometres (1.9 mi) west of the contemporary site of Tuja. The site is surrounded on three sides by sheer cliffs dropping over 100 metres (330 ft) down to the river. On the fourth side it connects to a 1.5-kilometre (0.93 mi) long ridge via a narrow neck of land just 5 metres (16 ft) wide. Although the site dominates the fertile floodplains below, the site itself is arid; the vegetation consists of thorny acacias and cacti.

== Settlement context ==
Ceramic evidence dates the site to the Late Postclassic (c. 1200–1524 AD). A significant amount of Early Phase ceramics were recovered (c. 1200–1350), but the majority of ceramics dated to the Late Phase (c. 1350–1524) and these demonstrated strong similarities with contemporary ceramics from Q'umarkaj, suggesting close links between the two sites during this phase. Site architecture is also closely related to architecture at the K'iche' capital, with west-facing temples, similar layout of flanking structures, a defensive ditch at the entrance, and the plaza floor coated with plaster. There are also important differences to the typical K'iche' settlement pattern as represented at the capital; the ballcourt is not oriented east–west, the architecture is mounted upon an acropolis with a steep defensive wall, and the main temple was radial. Investigator John Fox suggested that the differences may represent the Early Phase settlement pattern, before the site came under the influence of the central K'iche' region, and the similarities being the result of the later close relation with Q'umarkaj.

The K'iche' epic Popul Vuh describes four groups that settled around Sacapulas; these were the Lamakib, the Kumatz, the Tuhal Haa, and the Uch'aba Haa. Kumatz is now associated with the north side of the river, and Chutixtiox may have been Kumatz. The early colonial indigenous Annals of the Kaqchikels and the Título Xpantzay II both relate that Kumatz was conquered by the central K'iche' in the early 15th century AD. These ethnohistoric documents closely match the strong central K'iche' influence evidenced in the archaeology of the site.

== Site description ==
The earliest archaeological exploration of Chutixtiox was undertaken by A. Ledyard Smith in 1955. The site covers approximately 2 hectares (220,000 sq ft) and contains about 30 structures, with approximately half of these grouped around the main plaza.

=== Defences ===
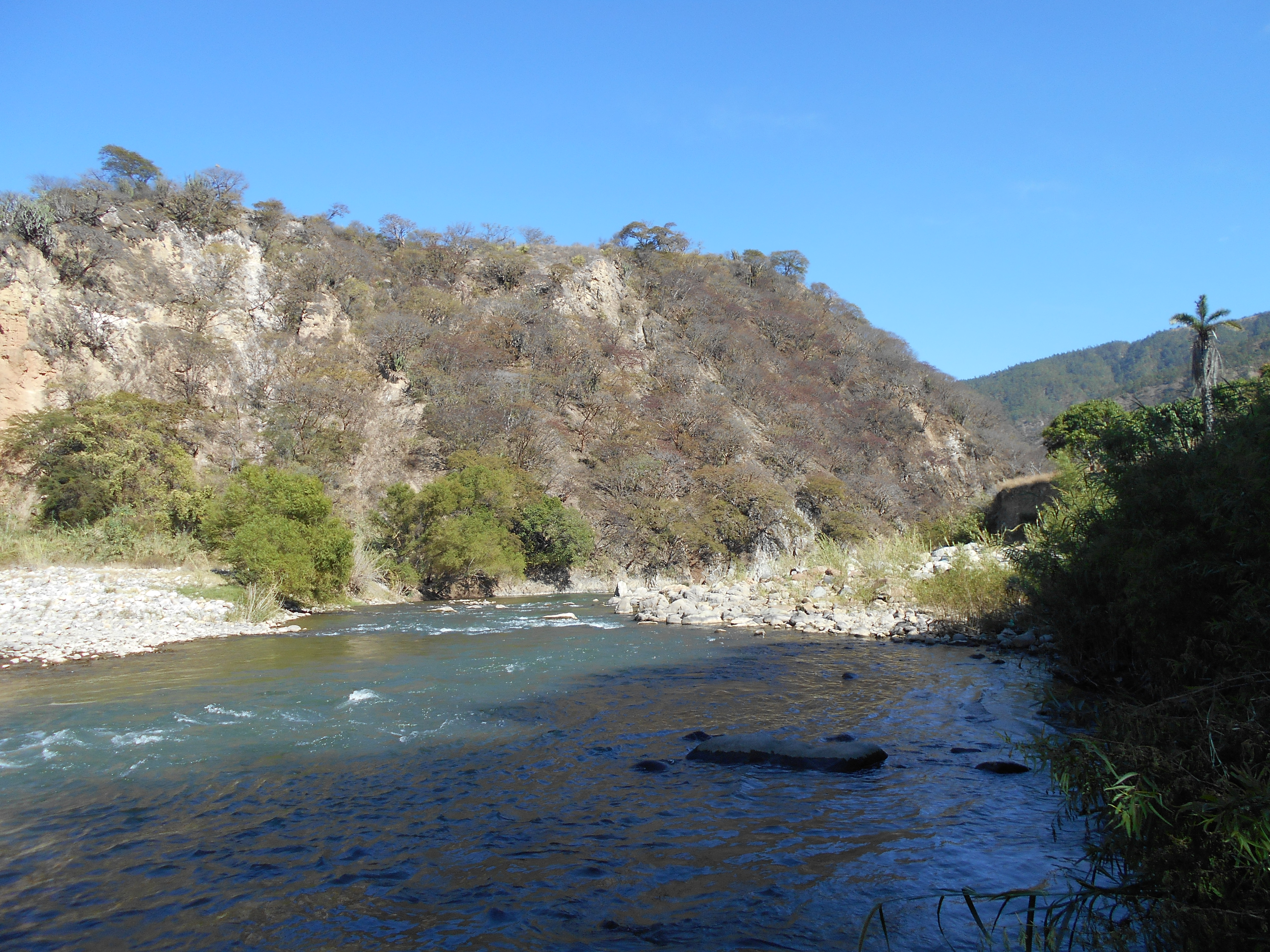
The ruins of Chutixtiox occupy a steep hilltop in a curve of the Río Negro

Chutixtiox occupies a highly defensible location, with a defensive wall and additional protection provided by surrounding cliffs. In two places where the drop to the river is not sheer, the natural slope has been fortified. A gentler slope westwards to the river, on the north side of the site, was reinforced with a 4-metre (13 ft) high wall running down from the hilltop to the river bank. On the northeast side the slope down to the river is naturally steep, but the top 3 to 4 metres (9.8 to 13.1 ft) was cut away to present a vertical drop. Chutixtiox had a single entrance on the northwest side, close to the upper end of the defensive wall. A defensive ditch was cut across the neck of land connecting the site to the adjacent ridge to defend the approach.

=== Architecture ===
The site core consists of an acropolis supporting a plaza, around which all the civic architecture is arranged, with the exception of two structures. The acropolis terrace rises 4 metres (13 ft) above the adjoining level, and has inset masonry retaining walls. Five stairways were used to access the acropolis level. The masonry is well-preserved and built from cut schistose slabs. In some places a later building stage uses dressed limestone blocks. The masonry was coated with plaster. The majority of structures at the site are aligned with the cardinal directions. The long structures at the site featured corbel vaulting, an architectural form derived from the Maya lowlands.

==== Main plaza ====
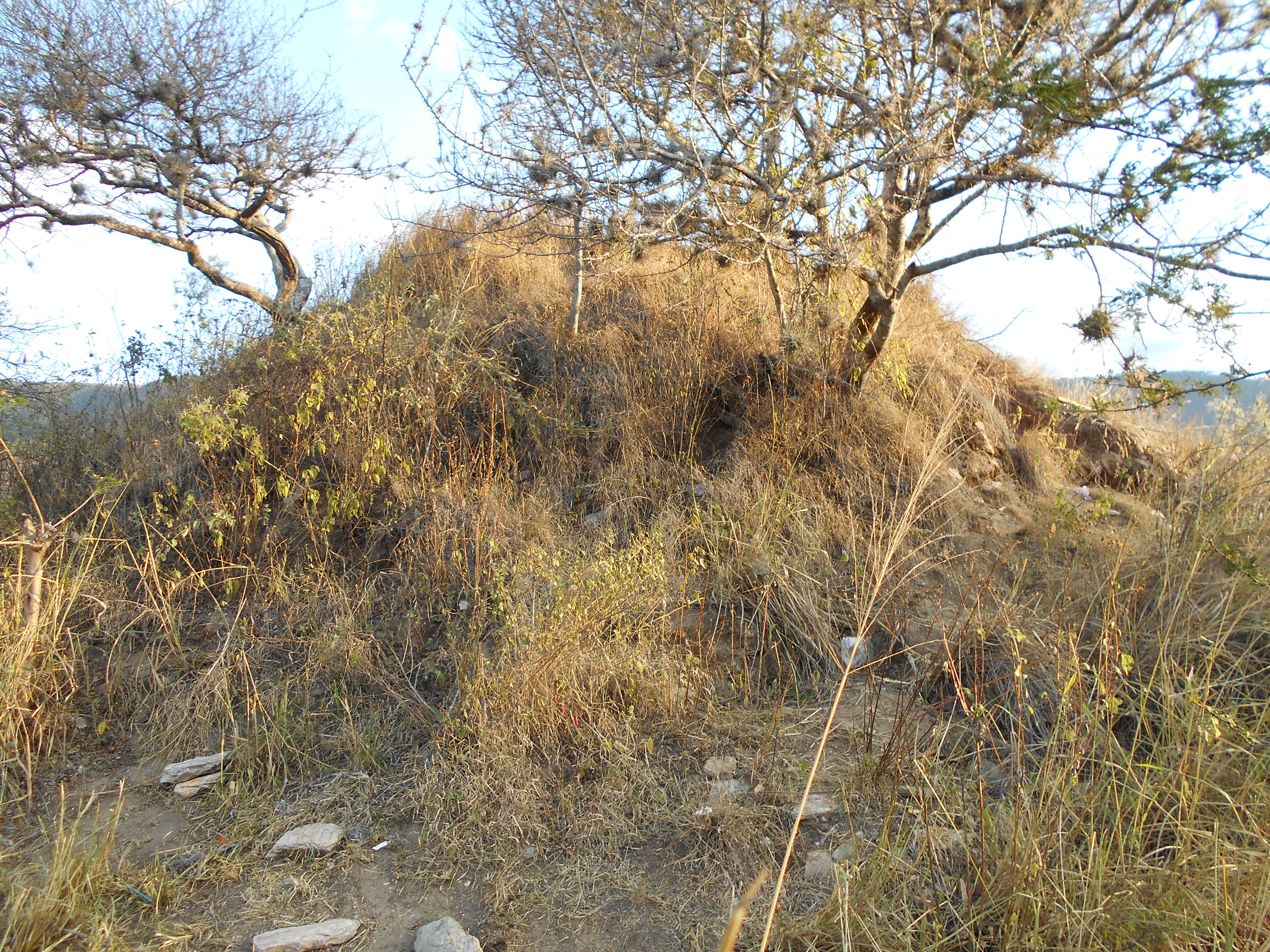
Radial pyramid located in the main plaza

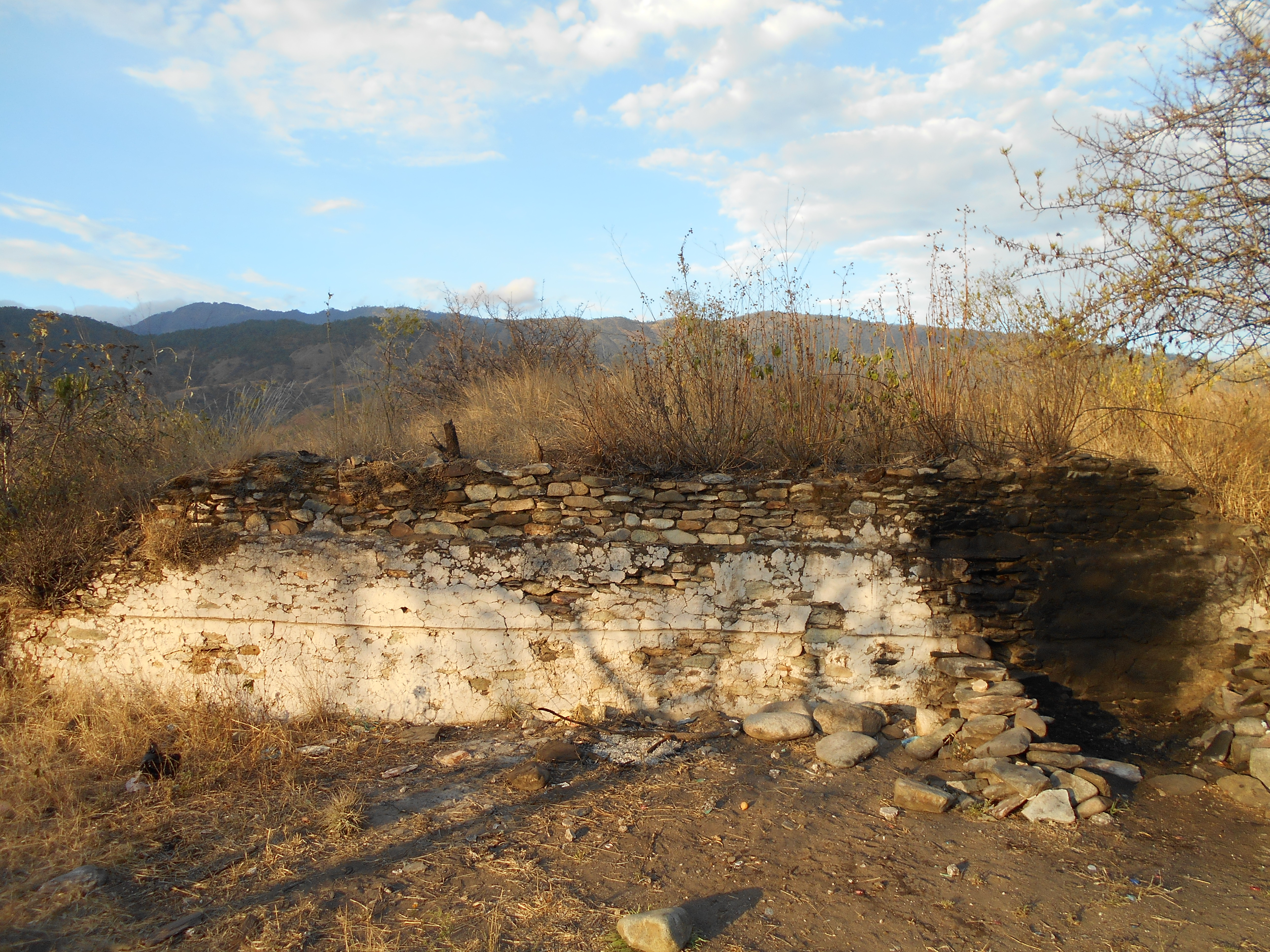
Long council-house structure with some stucco coating intact

The main plaza of the site features a radial pyramid with a single stairway on each side; it stands 6.8 metres (22 ft) tall. The pyramid is flanked by roughly symmetrical architectural complexes on the north and south sides of the plaza, consisting of a long council-house structure and a smaller shrine standing between the east end of each long structure and the radial temple. The flanking shrines stand approximately 3 metres (9.8 ft) high, and each possessed a single west-facing stairway. The long structures flanking the plaza each possessed a single room upon a basal platform, with benches set against the back and side walls. One of the long structures measures 22 by 5 metres (72 by 16 ft), standing upon a basal platform measuring 32 by 12 metres (105 by 39 ft).

Structure 10 possessed a stone-lined tomb, rectangular in form, with its doorway sealed by a stone slab. Structure 12 was a small shrine with doorways in all four sides. During excavations, a well-preserved sculpture of a crouching jaguar was uncovered at the base of the stairway of Structure 3, one of the long structures, and a life-size stucco sculpture of a jaguar was found buried with the deceased in a tomb under another of northern long structure flanking the main plaza.

The ballcourt measures 35 metres (115 ft) along its major axis and is aligned 15–17° off north–south. It is situated along the side of the plaza, upon a lower terrace, and may have been regarded as a part of the plaza complex. The walls of the playing area are almost vertical, and the top of the eastern range of the ballcourt is on the same level as the adjoining floor of the main plaza.

==== Secondary plaza ====
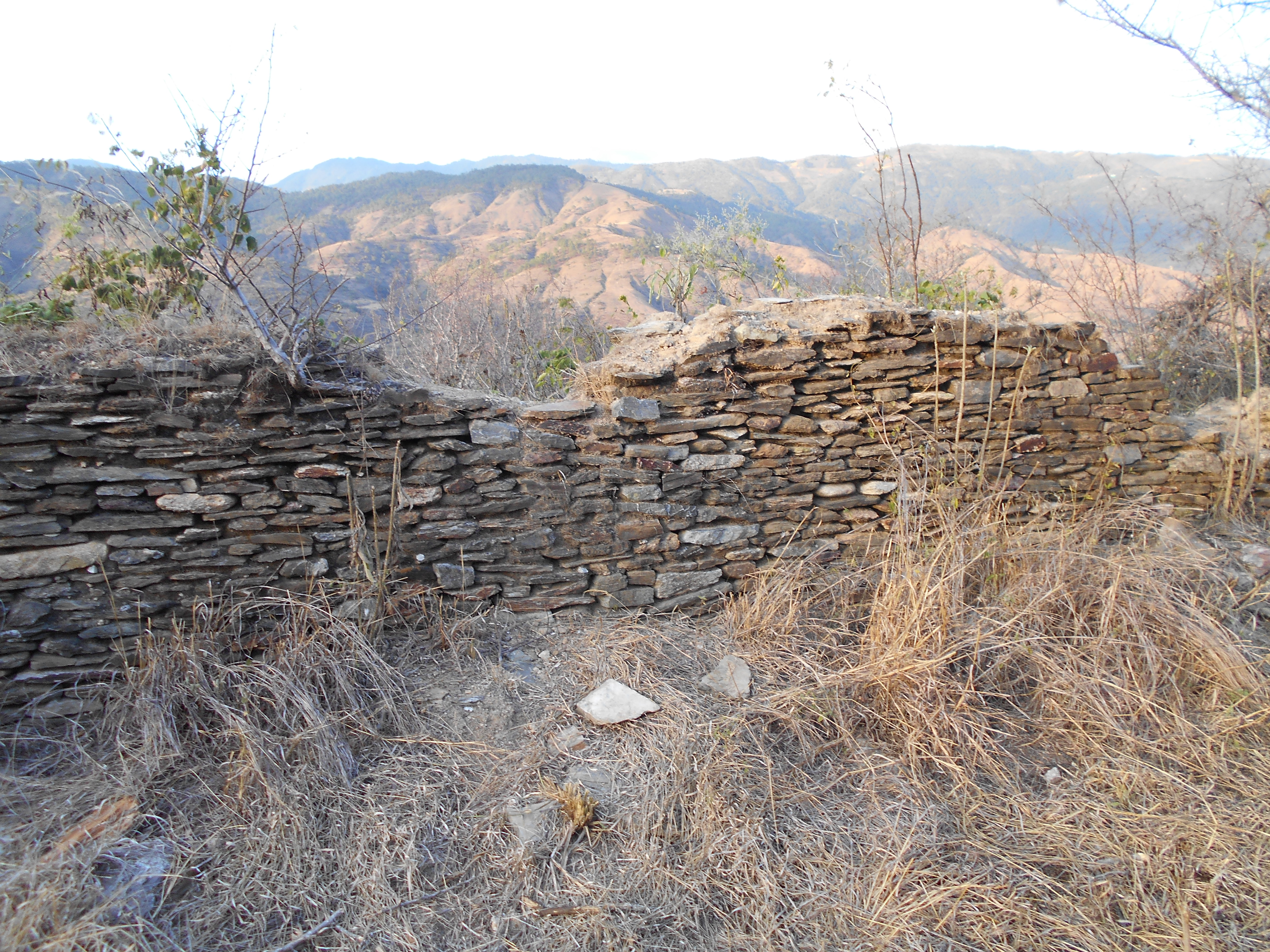
Long structure in the secondary plaza

On the same level as the ballcourt there is a secondary plaza that contains an unusual long structure with a sunken court. The superstructure possessed free-standing masonry walls, with a single room that contained benches. Holes near the top of the walls probably held wooden beams that supported a wooden roof. The long structure contained a raised plaster ring standing 5 centimetres (2.0 in) high, and measuring 1 metre (3.3 ft) across. An altar accompanies the long structure in the secondary plaza.

==== Other structures ====
Numerous low residential platforms are located on the western terraces of the site. An underground passage is said to lead down from the ruins to the river, but archaeologists were unable to verify its existence.
