= Joseph Harris (Wisconsin politician) =

American politician

Member of the Wisconsin Senate from the 22nd district
- In office January 14, 1864 – January 1866
- Preceded by: Thomas R. Hudd
- Succeeded by: Augustus L. Smith

Personal details
- Born: Joseph Harris; 1813 London, England
- Died: January, 1889 (aged 75-76)
- Party: National Union

Joseph Harris (1813–1889) was an American politician. A local official, he was a member of the Wisconsin State Senate in the 1860s.

== Biography ==
Harris was born in London, England. He settled in what is now Sturgeon Bay, Wisconsin, in 1855. In 1833, Harris had married Charlotte Singleton. They had five children. Following Charlotte's death, Harris married Susan Perkins in 1859. They also had five children. One son, Edward, went on to become Postmaster and Mayor of Sturgeon Bay, as well as a justice of the peace. Harris died in January 1889.

== Career ==
Harris represented the 22nd District in the Senate during the 1864 and 1865 sessions. In addition, he was County Clerk, Register of Deeds and County Treasurer of Door County, Wisconsin. Later, he was a private secretary to U.S. Senator Philetus Sawyer. A Republican, Harris was affiliated with the National Union Party.
