= Lawrence E. Cunningham =

American politician

Lawrence Cunningham
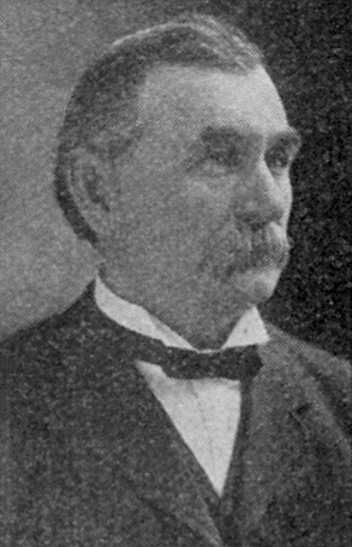

Mayor of Beloit

Member of the Wisconsin Senate from the 22nd district
- In office January 1912 – January 1921
- Preceded by: John Meek Whitehead
- Succeeded by: Eldo T. Ridgway

Personal details
- Born: Lawrence E. Cunningham; March 1, 1852 Beloit, Wisconsin, U.S.
- Died: July 4, 1924 Beloit, Wisconsin, U.S.
- Party: Republican
- Website: Official bio

Lawrence E. Cunningham (March 1, 1852 – July 4, 1924) was a member of the Wisconsin State Senate.

== Biography ==
Born in Beloit, Wisconsin, Cunningham was elected to the Senate from the 22nd District in 1912 and reelected in 1916, serving until January 1921. Additionally, he served four terms as Mayor of Beloit. Cunningham was a Republican.

Cunningham died at his home in Beloit on July 4, 1924, (Note: Some sources give a death date of July 5.) and was buried at Calvary Cemetery.
