= James Ryan (Wisconsin politician) =

American politician (1830–1913)

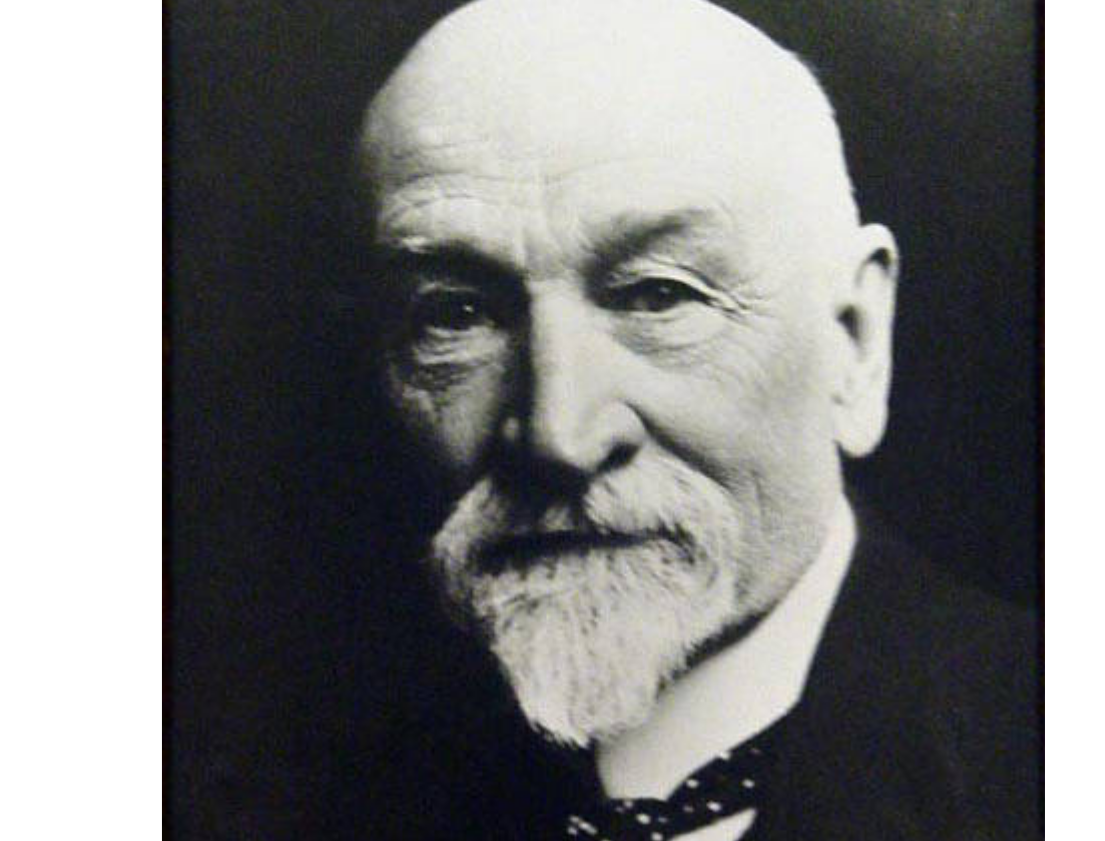

16th Mayor of Appleton, Wisconsin
- In office April 1878 – April 1879
- Preceded by: Joseph H. Marston
- Succeeded by: Orson W. Clark

Member of the Wisconsin Senate from the 22nd district
- In office January 3, 1876 – January 7, 1878
- Preceded by: Reinhard Schlichting
- Succeeded by: George N. Richmond

Personal details
- Born: March 24, 1830 Brown County, Michigan Territory, U.S.
- Died: January 5, 1913 Appleton, Wisconsin, U.S.
- Resting place: Riverside Cemetery, Appleton, Wisconsin
- Party: Democratic
- Spouses: Mary Lucinda Griffis (m. 1858; died 1874); Caroline L. Heath (Studley) (m. 1885; died 1906)
- Children: Samuel James Ryan^{(b. 1859; died 1939)}; Mary M. (Jones)^{(b. 1861; died 1958)}; Iva M. (Adams)^{(b. 1865; died 1949)}; Dudley Ryan^{(b. 1870; died 1966)}
- Relatives: Samuel Ryan Jr. (brother)

James Ryan (March 24, 1830 – January 5, 1913) was an Irish American newspaper publisher, Democratic politician, and Wisconsin pioneer. He was a long-time editor of the Appleton Crescent, served as the 16th mayor of Appleton, Wisconsin, and represented Calumet and Outagamie counties for two years in the Wisconsin State Senate.

== Biography ==
Ryan was born on March 24, 1830, at Fort Howard, on the Bay of Green Bay. At the time of his birth, this was unorganized land in Brown County, Michigan Territory, and Ryan was one of the first American children born in what would become the state of Wisconsin. His parents had arrived there from New York in 1826, just a few months after the completion of the Erie Canal, which facilitated migration to the western territories.

Ryan received a common school education, and learned the printing trade. In 1854, he moved to Appleton, Wisconsin, to work with his older brother Samuel on his newspaper, the Appleton Crescent. The brothers would work together on the newspaper for the rest of their lives, the paper they created still exists today as The Post-Crescent.

At the outbreak of the American Civil War, Ryan volunteered for service, but was refused, failing the physical examination.

In Appleton, he was chief of the volunteer fire department, served on the city council, and was appointed city treasurer. He was elected without opposition to the Wisconsin Senate in 1875, representing the 22nd Senate district—Calumet County and the southern half Outagamie County. He was not a candidate for re-election in 1877. In the Senate he served on the Committee on Incorporations and Public Improvements. After leaving the Senate, he was elected mayor of Appleton, serving from April 1878 through April 1879.

In 1886, he was appointed postmaster at Appleton by President Grover Cleveland, ultimately serving four years.

He died at his home in Appleton in 1913, and was interred at Appleton's Riverside Cemetery.

== Personal life and family ==
James Ryan was one of eight children born to Samuel Ryan Sr. and his wife Martha (née Johnston). Both parents were born in Ireland. Samuel Sr. was impressed into service in the Royal Navy. He was sent to America to fight during the War of 1812 but defected to the American side. He subsequently fought for the American army at Plattsburg and Lundy's Lane. After coming to Green Bay, Sam Ryan served as quartermaster at Fort Howard and was named a colonel of one of the first two militia regiments in the Wisconsin Territory. In addition to founding the Crescent, James's eldest brother, Samuel Ryan Jr., served in the state Assembly and served eight years as county judge.

James married twice. He had four children with Mary L. Griffis, who he married in September 1858. After her death in 1874, he subsequently married Mrs. Caroline Studley (née Heath) in 1885. She died in 1906. At the time of his death, all four of Ryan's children were still living, as well as three grandchildren.

Wisconsin Senate
Preceded by Reinhard Schlichting	Member of the Wisconsin Senate from the 22nd district January 3, 1876 – January 7, 1878	Succeeded by George N. Richmond
Political offices
Preceded by Joseph H. Marston	Mayor of Appleton, Wisconsin; April 1878 – April 1879	Succeeded by Orson W. Clark
