= Ezra A. Bowen =

American politician

Member of the Wisconsin Senate from the 22nd district
- In office January 12, 1854 – January 6, 1856
- Preceded by: Judson Prentice
- Succeeded by: S. L. Rose

Personal details
- Born: Ezra A. Bowen Mayville, Wisconsin, US
- Party: Democratic

Ezra A. Bowen was an American politician. He was a Democratic member of the Wisconsin Senate from 1854 to 1855. He was a native of Mayville, Wisconsin.
