= Samuel Ryan Jr. =

19th-century American politician and newspaper publisher

Sam Ryan Jr.

County Judge of Outagamie County, Wisconsin
- In office January 1, 1866 – January 5, 1874
- Preceded by: G. H. Myers
- Succeeded by: J. E. Harriman

Member of the Wisconsin State Assembly from the Outagamie district
- In office January 2, 1865 – January 1, 1866
- Preceded by: George Kreiss
- Succeeded by: W. H. P. Bogan

Personal details
- Born: March 13, 1824 Sackets Harbor, New York, U.S.
- Died: March 26, 1907 (aged 83) Appleton, Wisconsin, U.S.
- Cause of death: Pneumonia
- Party: Democratic
- Spouses: Laura E. Knappen (m. 1847; died 1850); Calista M. Crane (m. 1853; died 1869); Martha S. Driggs (m. 1871; died 1907)
- Relatives: James Ryan (brother)

Military service
- Allegiance: United States
- Branch/service: United States Army; Union Army
- Years of service: 1861–1863
- Rank: Sergeant
- Unit: 3rd Reg. Wis. Vol. Cavalry
- Battles/wars: American Civil War

Samuel Ryan Jr. (March 13, 1824 – March 26, 1907) was an Irish American newspaper publisher, Democratic politician, and Wisconsin pioneer. He was the founder of the Appleton Crescent (now The Post-Crescent), served eight years as county judge of Outagamie County, Wisconsin (1866–1874), and served one year in the Wisconsin State Assembly (1865).

== Biography ==
Ryan was born in Sackets Harbor, New York, in 1824. As a child, he moved with his parents to Green Bay in 1826, when it was still part of the Michigan Territory. As a young man in Green Bay, he learned the printing trade, and worked as editor of several pre-statehood papers in Green Bay, including the Green Bay Spectator and the Green Bay Wisconsin Republican. In 1853, he established the Appleton Crescent, which he edited and published until his death in 1907.

During the American Civil War, he volunteered for service in the 3rd Wisconsin Cavalry Regiment, under the command of Colonel William A. Barstow, a former Wisconsin governor. Ryan was assigned to quartermaster and commissary detail at Leavenworth, Kansas, but was discharged due to illness in 1863.

After his war service, Ryan returned to Appleton and, in 1864, was elected as a Democrat to the Wisconsin State Assembly, representing Outagamie County in the 1865 session. During 1865, he was elected County Judge for Outagamie County, where he ultimately served eight years.

Later in life, he was appointed U.S. consul at St. John's, Newfoundland, by President Grover Cleveland.

Ryan died of pneumonia in 1907 at the home of his brother, James, in Appleton, Wisconsin.

== Personal life and family ==
Samuel Ryan Jr. was the eldest of eight children born to Samuel Ryan Sr. and his wife Martha (née Johnston). Both parents were born in Ireland. Samuel Sr. was impressed into service in the Royal Navy. He was sent to America to fight during the War of 1812 but defected to the American side. He subsequently fought for the American army at Plattsburg and Lundy's Lane. After coming to Green Bay, Sam Ryan served as quartermaster at Fort Howard and was named a colonel of one of the first two militia regiments in the Wisconsin Territory. Sam Jr.'s younger brother James Ryan also came to Appleton and served as an editor on the Crescent.

He was married three times: He first married Laura E. Knappen on June 1, 1847. After her death in 1850, he married Calista M. Crane in 1853. Calista died in 1869, and in 1871 Ryan married Martha S. Driggs. His third wife died just 8 days before him in 1907. He had no children.

Wisconsin State Assembly
| Preceded by George Kreiss | Member of the Wisconsin State Assembly from the Outagamie district January 2, 1865 – January 1, 1866 | Succeeded by W. H. P. Bogan |
Legal offices
| Preceded by G. H. Myers | County Judge of Outagamie County, Wisconsin; January 1, 1866 – January 5, 1874 | Succeeded by J. E. Harriman |
