= S. L. Rose =

19th century American politician (1818–1887)

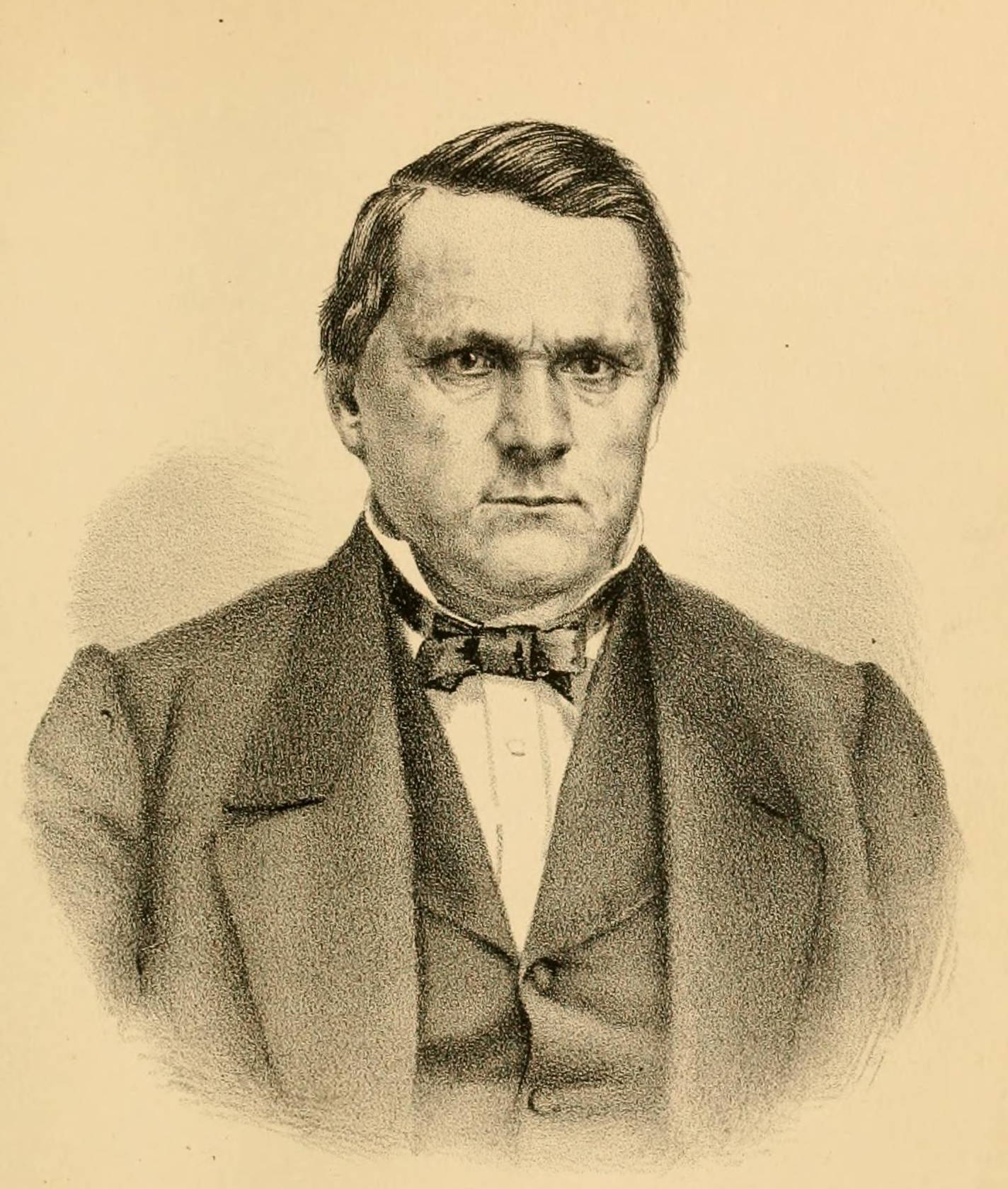
- From The History of Dodge County, Wisconsin (1880)

Iowa Circuit Court Judge for the 2nd circuit of the 11th judicial district
- In office January 1869 – January 1873
- Preceded by: Position established
- Succeeded by: J. H. Bradley

Member of the Wisconsin Senate from the 22nd district
- In office January 7, 1856 – January 4, 1858
- Preceded by: Ezra A. Bowen
- Succeeded by: William E. Smith

Member of the Wisconsin State Assembly from the Dodge 5th district
- In office January 1, 1855 – January 7, 1856
- Preceded by: John W. Davis
- Succeeded by: Charles Burchard

County Judge of Dodge County, Wisconsin
- In office December 1850 – June 1855
- Appointed by: Nelson Dewey
- Preceded by: George W. Greene
- Succeeded by: Leonard Mertz

Personal details
- Born: December 19, 1818 Augusta, New York, U.S.
- Died: March 14, 1887 (aged 68) Beaver Dam, Wisconsin, U.S.
- Resting place: Beaver Dam City Cemetery
- Party: Republican (after 1858); Democratic
- Profession: Lawyer

Samuel L. Rose (December 19, 1818 – March 14, 1887) was an American lawyer, judge, and politician. He was a pioneer settler of Beaver Dam, Wisconsin, and represented that part of the state in the Wisconsin State Senate (1856 & 1857) and State Assembly (1855). He later served as an Iowa circuit court judge and is the namesake of Rose Grove Township, Hamilton County, Iowa.

His name was incorrectly listed as "Solomon L. Rose" in several editions of the Wisconsin Blue Book. But all of the obituaries for Samuel L. Rose and the biographies of the Samuel L. Rose in Iowa are consistent with the biographies of the S. L. Rose who resided in Beaver Dam and served in the Wisconsin Legislature.

== Early life and education ==
Samuel L. Rose was born in Augusta, New York on December 19, 1818. He was raised and educated there, attending the Augusta Academy for much of his teenage years. When he was 16, during the winter of 1836, he taught school at Kennett Square, Pennsylvania. Among his students during this term were Bayard Taylor and James P. Wickersham.

While studying at the academy, he delved into medical science, but ultimately decided to focus on law. After graduating, he went on to read law under the tutelage of Samuel Beardsley in Utica, New York, and later with Timothy Jenkins, in Oneida County. He was admitted to the bar in 1841, and practiced law in New York until moving west in 1850.

== Wisconsin career ==
Shortly after arriving in Wisconsin, in December 1850, Rose was appointed county judge of Dodge County by Governor Nelson Dewey, to fill the vacancy caused by the resignation of the incumbent judge, George W. Greene.

In February 1852 he helped organize a new Jefferson and Dodge County agricultural society, and became a vice-president for Beaver Dam.; in October, the new Society would hold their first annual county fair, and Rose would serve as a judge in the category of Fruits. He was elected as town chairman (equivalent to mayor) of Beaver Dam in April 1852, which made him ex officio a member of the county board of supervisors. In September 1852 he and Ezra Bowen were on the executive committee of the newly-organized Dodge County Democratic Committee in preparation for the forthcoming general election. In 1853, he was the Democratic nominee for re-election to his position as county judge, and was re-elected without opposition.

=== Legislative and educational affairs ===
He was elected in 1854 to a one-year term as a member of the Wisconsin State Assembly in the 1855 8th Wisconsin Legislature. In the fall of 1855 he was elected to a two-year term as a member of the Wisconsin Senate representing the 22nd Senate district (Dodge County), for 1856 and 1857 (the 9th and 10th Wisconsin Legislatures), succeeding fellow Democrat Ezra Bowen.

When the Legislature chartered Wayland University in January 1855 and Judson Female Seminary in March, Rose was made a trustee of both institutions. The legislature also added him as a new trustee of the Wisconsin Baptist Educational Society, which was permitted to pass part or all of its assets over to Wayland.

=== Business ===
In 1855, Rose was 40% shareholder and President of the Dodge County Bank.

=== Railroad advocate ===
As early as January 1853, Rose was actively participated in a meeting in support of Moses Strong's announced La Crosse and Milwaukee Railroad; and in a convention seeking to have a railroad built between Watertown and Berlin, Wisconsin. When the Berlin and Watertown Railroad was chartered by the Legislature in the spring, Rose was one of the directors designated by the Legislature.

In March 1855, the Legislature of which Rose was now a member chartered the Beaver Dam and Baraboo Railroad Company and the Madison, Fond du Lac and Lake Michigan Railroad Company, making him a director of each of these companies.

In 1857, he moved to Milwaukee, where he was briefly president of the Milwaukee and Western Railroad Company.

== Iowa career ==
In 1862, Rose moved west to Iowa and purchased 1000 acres at a site called "Skunk Grove" in Hamilton County, Iowa. He purchased the only hotel in the area and opened a post office, where he was named postmaster. Rose was elected to the Hamilton County board for several years, and through a petition to the state legislature, he was able to get the name of the township changed to "Rose Grove" in 1866.

In 1868, the Iowa Legislature created the new office of circuit court judges in the state judiciary, and at the Fall 1868 election, Rose was elected the first judge of the 2nd circuit in the 11th judicial district.

== Death ==
In the late 1870s, Rose returned to Beaver Dam. He died there on March 14, 1887.

== Personal life and family ==
Samuel Rose was a son of Nathaniel Rose, a medical doctor in Oneida County, New York, and his wife Abigail (née Knowles). Rose's maternal ancestors were said to have arrived in North America aboard the Mayflower. His paternal grandfather, Timothy Rose, was a private in the Connecticut militia during the American Revolutionary War and was killed in the Wyoming Massacre. There is no mention of Samuel Rose having a wife or children.

Wisconsin State Assembly
Preceded by John W. Davis	Member of the Wisconsin State Assembly from the Dodge 5th district January 1, 1855 – January 7, 1856	Succeeded by Charles Burchard
Wisconsin Senate
Preceded by Ezra A. Bowen	Member of the Wisconsin Senate from the 22nd district January 7, 1856 – January 4, 1858	Succeeded by William E. Smith
Legal offices
Preceded by George W. Greene	County Judge of Dodge County, Wisconsin; December 1850 – June 1855	Succeeded by Leonard Mertz
New court established	Iowa Circuit Court Judge for the 2nd circuit of the 11th judicial district January 1869 – January 1873	Succeeded by J. H. Bradley
