= John C. Petersen =

American politician (1842–1887)

John C. Petersen (November 2, 1842 – July 10, 1887) was an American butcher and farmer from Appleton, Wisconsin who served as a member of the Wisconsin State Assembly from Outagamie County. He was elected in 1878 as a Greenbacker, and was re-elected the next year as a "Greenback Democrat" (even though he was opposed by a Democrat).

== Background ==
Petersen was born in Glückstadt, Holstein-Glückstadt (now part of Germany but then ruled by the Kings of Denmark) on November 2, 1842. He received a common school education, and became a butcher by occupation. Petersen came to Wisconsin in 1862, and settled in Appleton, where he was elected to various township offices.

== Public office ==
Petersen was elected to the assembly for 1879 from Outagamie County's 1st Assembly district (The City of Appleton, and the Towns of Buchanan, Center, Freedom, Grand Chute and Kaukauna), receiving 1,096 votes against 1,000 for Republican B. T. Rogers (Rep.), and 423 for incumbent William Smith Warner (who had been elected as an "Independent Democrat" but was now the Democratic nominee). He was assigned to the standing committee on public improvements.

He was re-elected for 1880 by 963 votes, against 779 for D. J. Brothers, a Democrat, and 434 for P. P. Wing, a Republican. Even though he was re-elected running against a Democrat, he is listed in the 1880 Wisconsin Blue Book as a "Greenback Democrat": there were 71 Republicans, 27 Democrats, Petersen (listed separately as "Greenback Democrat") and one Greenback (David Bean) listed in the Assembly roster for that year. He remained on the public improvements committee. Petersen was not a candidate for re-election for 1881, and was succeeded by Democrat Henry Clay Sloan.

== Personal life ==
Petersen married Wilhelmina "Minnie" Freiberg, born in Stettin, Pomerania in 1849; they were the parents of five children. Petersen was in the butcher business at Appleton for about twenty-five years, then moved to a farm in Grand Chute township which he operated until his retirement, and then returned to Appleton, where he died on July 10, 1887. His widow survived him, living until 1932. They are buried at Riverside Cemetery in Appleton.
