= Marvin H. Bovee =

American politician

Member of the Wisconsin Senate from the 10th district
- In office January 3, 1853 – January 2, 1854
- Preceded by: Judson Prentice
- Succeeded by: James DeNoon Reymert

Personal details
- Born: January 5, 1827 Amsterdam, New York, U.S.
- Died: May 7, 1888 (aged 61) Whitewater, Wisconsin, U.S.
- Resting place: Hillside Cemetery, Whitewater, Wisconsin
- Party: Democratic
- Spouse: Laura S. Dowd (died 1920)
- Children: Maud Luella (Halverson)^{(b. 1864; died 1935)}; Rollin Forrest Bovee^{(b. 1875; died 1954)}

Marvin Henry Bovee (January 5, 1827 – May 7, 1888) was an American educator and advocate for the abolition of the death penalty. He served one year in the Wisconsin State Senate (1853) and authored the act which abolished capital punishment in the state of Wisconsin (1853 Wis. Act 103). He later wrote a treatise about the immorality of capital punishment and delivered over 1,200 lectures on the issue around the country over the last 30 years of his life.

== Biography ==
Bovee was born in Amsterdam, New York. He moved with his family to Wisconsin in 1843, settling in Mukwonago and later moving to Eagle, Wisconsin. Bovee campaigned around the United States against capital punishment and published a book on the subject entitled Christ and the Gallows; or Reasons for the Abolition of Capital Punishment. He died from melancholia at his home in Whitewater, Wisconsin.

== Political career ==
Bovee was a member of the Senate in 1853. Previously, he had been Chairman of the Board of Supervisors in Eagle. He was a Democrat.

== Published works ==
- Bovee, Marvin H. (1869). Christ and the Gallows; or Reasons for the Abolition of Capital Punishment. New York City: Masonic Publishing Company.

Wisconsin Senate
Preceded by Judson Prentice	Member of the Wisconsin Senate from the 10th district January 3, 1853 – January 2, 1854	Succeeded by James DeNoon Reymert
