= William Young (Wisconsin politician) =

American politician

Member of the Wisconsin Senate from the 22nd district
- In office January 1868 – January 1870
- Preceded by: Augustus L. Smith
- Succeeded by: George Baldwin

Personal details
- Born: William Young; December 23, 1821
- Died: November 24, 1890 (aged 68)
- Party: Democratic

Military service
- Allegiance: United States
- Years of service: 1862-1865
- Rank: Lieutenant
- Battles/wars: American Civil War

William Young (December 23, 1821 – November 24, 1890) was a member of the Wisconsin State Senate. He represented the 22nd District as a Democrat during the 1868 and 1869 sessions.

== Life ==
His parents were Samuel Young and Mary Young (née Shangle). He was of German ancestry, descended from the Jungs of New Jersey.

Young arrived in Outagamie County, Wisconsin, in April 1848, in what is now Medina, where his cedar-log shanty became a stopping place for travellers going north. He bought land from Zebediah Hyde (one of the earliest white men to settle in the place) and built a large hotel and livery stable. The place was called Youngs' Corner, and grew into the village of Medina after Dale was constituted as a town in 1853.

=== Civil War ===
He enlisted on August 8, 1862, in the 32nd Wisconsin Volunteers The 32nd were known as the "Bandbox Regiment", named for soldiers who were more impressive on parade than on the firing line.

In October 1862, the farmers of the town of Dale assembled and raised $131 in a few hours with which to purchase a fine sword for Lieutenant William Young of Company "I", Thirty-second regiment. Captain Wood's company was called the Outagamie Tigers. The officers elected in September were George Wood (captain), William Young (first lieutenant) and D. K. Quimby (second lieutenant). They became Company I of the regiment and numbered 98 men.

He resigned his commission a year later on August 8, 1863, and later joined Company "A" of the 47th Wisconsin Volunteers, enlisting at Dale on February 18, 1865, and mustered out on September 4, 1865. It was reported by the Appleton Post-Crescent that Captain Young during the war enlisted 300 of the men who went from Outagamie county into the Union army.

=== Senator ===
Young was nominated by the Democrats as State senator for the 22nd District in fall 1867. Young had a "splendid military record" and was well known in this county where he resided.

He died in 1890 and is buried South Medina Cemetery, located about ½ mile south of Medina.

== Family life ==
With his wife Nancy Young, he had a daughter Mary Adelia Young (later McIntyre).
