= Bernard C. Wolter =

American businessman and politician (1852–1936)

B. C. Wolter

30th Mayor of Appleton, Wisconsin
- In office April 1908 – April 1910
- Preceded by: David Hammel
- Succeeded by: James V. Canavan

Member of the Wisconsin State Assembly from the Outagamie 1st district
- In office January 4, 1897 – January 2, 1899
- Preceded by: Hubert Wolf
- Succeeded by: Theophilus Albert Willy

Personal details
- Born: February 26, 1852 Mecklenburg-Schwerin, German Confederation
- Died: March 31, 1936 (aged 84) Appleton, Wisconsin, U.S.
- Resting place: Riverside Cemetery, Appleton, Wisconsin
- Party: Republican
- Spouse: Flora Spencer (died 1939)
- Children: Raymond Spencer Wolter^{(b. 1882; died 1889)}; Robert Kirtland Wolter^{(b. 1883; died 1956)}
- Education: University of Wisconsin

Bernard Charles Wolter (February 26, 1852 – March 31, 1936) was a German American immigrant, businessman, and Republican politician. He was the 30th mayor of Appleton, Wisconsin, and represented Outagamie County in the Wisconsin State Assembly in 1897 and 1898. In contemporaneous documents he was often referred to as B. C. Wolter.

== Biography ==
Born in the Grand Duchy of Mecklenburg-Schwerin (modern day Germany), Wolter emigranted to the United States in 1854. He went to public schools in Outagamie County, Wisconsin, and Neenah High School in Neenah, Wisconsin. Wolter graduated from University of Wisconsin in 1875, with a degree in civil engineering. He sold agricultural implements and lived in Appleton, Wisconsin. He served as president of Wolter Motor Company in Appleton, Wisconsin. Wolter served as county clerk for Outagamie County from 1878 to 1886, and was a Republican. In 1897 and 1898, Wolter served in the Wisconsin State Assembly. Later, Wolter also served as mayor of Appleton, Wisconsin from 1908 to 1910. Wolter died in Appleton, Wisconsin.
