= 45th Wisconsin Infantry Regiment =

Union Army infantry regiment

- Flag of Wisconsin
- Active: November 8, 1864 – July 17, 1865
- Country: United States
- Allegiance: Union
- Branch: Infantry
- Size: Regiment
- Engagements: American Civil War: Battle of Nashville

Commanders
- Colonel: Henry F. Belitz

The 45th Wisconsin Infantry Regiment was a volunteer infantry regiment that served in the Union Army during the American Civil War.

== Service ==
The 45th Wisconsin was organized at Madison, Wisconsin, and mustered into Federal service on November 8, 1864. It was assigned to the garrison of Nashville, Tennessee, for its entire service.

The regiment was mustered out on July 17, 1865.

== Casualties ==
The 45th Wisconsin suffered 34 enlisted men who died of disease, for a total of 34 fatalities.

== Commanders ==
- Colonel Henry F. Belitz

== Notable people ==
- John B. Abert, son of George Abert, was a musician in Co. I. After the war he became a deputy sheriff and city councilmember in Milwaukee.
- Peter Philipps was drafted and served as a sergeant in Co. B. After the war he became a Wisconsin state legislator.
- Peter Reuther was drafted and served as first sergeant in Co. B. After the war he became a Wisconsin state legislator.
- Bernard Schlichting was captain of Co. C after briefly serving as first lieutenant of Co. G. Earlier in the war, he was enlisted in Co. G of the 9th Michigan Infantry Regiment. After the war he became a Wisconsin state legislator.
- Reinhard Schlichting was captain of Co. A. Earlier in the war, he was a second lieutenant in Co. K of the 9th Wisconsin Infantry Regiment. After the war he became a Wisconsin state legislator, district attorney, and mayor of Chilton, Wisconsin.

== See also ==
- List of Wisconsin Civil War units
- Wisconsin in the American Civil War
