= George Baldwin (Wisconsin politician) =

American politician and businessman

Member of the Wisconsin Senate from the 22nd district
- In office January 1870 – January 1872
- Preceded by: William Young
- Succeeded by: George Kreiss

Personal details
- Born: George Baldwin; January 22, 1830 St. Johnsbury, Vermont, U.S.
- Died: December 7, 1907 (aged 77) Appleton, Wisconsin, U.S.
- Party: Democratic

George Baldwin (January 22, 1830 – December 7, 1907) was a Wisconsin politician and businessman.

Born in St. Johnsbury, Vermont, Baldwin studied law, and was admitted to the Vermont bar. He moved to Calumet County, Wisconsin, where he practiced law. He was mayor of Chilton, Wisconsin, and county judge of Calumet County. He served in the Wisconsin State Assembly in 1866 and was elected to the Wisconsin State Senate in 1870. He moved to Appleton, Wisconsin in order to manage his real estate holdings. He died in Appleton, leaving an estate valued at nearly $5 million.
