= James Campion =

American politician

James Campion was a member of the Wisconsin State Assembly in 1883, representing the 1st District of Outagamie County, Wisconsin, and a portion of Calumet County, Wisconsin. He was a Democrat. Campion was born on January 17, 1824, in Ireland.
