= A. Ledyard Smith =

American archaeologist

- Born: October 18, 1901; Milwaukee, Wisconsin, U.S.
- Died: December 5, 1985 (aged 84); Needham, Massachusetts, U.S.
- Resting place: Woodlawn Cemetery, Bronx, New York
- Education: Harvard University
- Occupation: Archaeologist
- Spouses: Nancy Sawyer Falk (m. 1931, divorced); Katharine Hazard Moss (m. 1948; died 1955); Elizabeth Taggart Griggs (m. 1968–1985)
- Children: 2 with Nancy Falk; 1 with Katherine Moss; 1 adopted
- Relatives: Augustus L. Smith (grandfather)

Augustus Ledyard Smith III (October 18, 1901 – December 5, 1985) was an American archaeologist who worked on various projects in the Maya region on behalf of the Carnegie Institution, including Uaxactun. From 1958 to 1963 he led investigations at Altar de Sacrificios in Guatemala together with Gordon Willey on behalf of the Peabody Museum of Archaeology and Ethnology. From 1963 to 1969 he investigated the site of Seibal, also in Guatemala.

His grandfather, Augustus L. Smith, was a Wisconsin pioneer who served as a Wisconsin state senator and mayor of Appleton, Wisconsin.

== Biography ==
Ledyard Smith was born on October 18, 1901, in Milwaukee, and died of a heart attack on December 5, 1985, in Needham, Massachusetts. His brother Robert Eliot Smith was also a Maya archaeologist.

Ledyard Smith went to school in Lausanne in Switzerland and later went to St. Paul's School in New England. He graduated from Harvard University in 1925. In 1927 he became involved in Maya archaeology and became a member of staff of the Carnegie Institution's Division of Archaeology. He took part in field research in the Maya region in the 1920s and 1930s at Uaxactun in the Petén Department of Guatemala. After excavating at Uaxactun he turned his attention to the Guatemalan Highlands. In 1950 he started work with the Carnegie archaeologists excavating at Mayapan in the Mexican state of Yucatán.

The archaeological work of the Carnegie Institution came to an end in 1958 and Ledyard Smith moved to the Peabody Museum of Archaeology and Ethnology where he became an assistant curator. In 1968, the Guatemalan government bestowed the Order of the Quetzal upon him for his services to the culture and heritage of the country.
