= William Smith Warner =

American politician

William Smith Warner (February 1, 1817 – January 6, 1897) was a member of the Wisconsin State Assembly.

== Biography ==
Warner was born on February 1, 1817, in Hector, New York. He settled in Appleton, Wisconsin, in 1849. He died in Fond du Lac on January 6, 1897.

== Career ==
Warner was a member of the Assembly during the 1878 session. While a member, he was identified as an Independent Democrat. He was defeated for re-election as a Democratic candidate by John C. Petersen. Other positions Warner held include Postmaster, City Attorney and an alderman of Appleton, and justice of the peace.
