= Geisfeld =

- Municipality
- Coat of arms

- Location of Geisfeld within Trier-Saarburg district
- Interactive map of Geisfeld
- Location within Germany Location within Rhineland-Palatinate
- Coordinates: 49°42′56.6856″N 6°57′23.0976″E
- Country: Germany
- State: Rhineland-Palatinate
- District: Trier-Saarburg
- Municipal assoc.: Hermeskeil

Government
  - Mayor (2019–24): Theo Palm

Area
  - Total: 8.87 km^{2} (3.42 sq mi)
- Elevation: 440 m (1,440 ft)

Population (2025-12-31)
  - Total: 476
  - Density: 53.7/km^{2} (139/sq mi)
- Time zone: UTC+01:00 (CET)
  - Summer (DST): UTC+02:00 (CEST)
- Postal codes: 54413
- Dialling codes: 06586
- Vehicle registration: TR
- Website: www.geisfeld.de

Geisfeld is a municipality in the Trier-Saarburg district, in Rhineland-Palatinate, Germany.
