= George N. Richmond =

19th century American politician

Member of the Wisconsin Senate from the 22nd district
- In office January 7, 1878 – January 5, 1880
- Preceded by: James Ryan
- Succeeded by: Benjamin F. Carter

Member of the Wisconsin State Assembly from the Outagamie district
- In office January 5, 1874 – January 3, 1876
- Preceded by: John A. Roemer
- Succeeded by: David Hammel

8th & 10th Mayor of Appleton, Wisconsin
- In office April 1871 – April 1872
- Preceded by: A. L. Smith
- Succeeded by: Ephriam C. Goff
- In office April 1868 – April 1870
- Preceded by: Robert R. Bateman
- Succeeded by: A. L. Smith

5th Mayor of Portage, Wisconsin
- In office April 1860 – April 1862
- Preceded by: John P. McGregor
- Succeeded by: Alvin B. Alden

Personal details
- Born: April 18, 1821 Hillsdale, New York, U.S.
- Died: January 4, 1896 (aged 74) Tacoma, Washington, U.S.
- Resting place: Tacoma Cemetery, Tacoma, Washington
- Party: Democratic; Reform (1873–1875)
- Spouse: Sarah Jane Hillyer (m. 1843–1896)
- Children: Hattie M. (Wroe)^{(b. 1854; died 1925)}; Elizabeth (Miller)^{(b. 1858; died 1933)}; Horace Nelson Richmond^{(b. 1860; died 1934)}
- Occupation: Paper manufacturer

Military service
- Allegiance: United States
- Branch/service: United States Volunteers; Union Army
- Years of service: 1861–1864
- Rank: Major, USV
- Unit: 2nd Reg. Wis. Vol. Cavalry
- Battles/wars: American Civil War

George Nelson Richmond (April 18, 1821 – January 4, 1896) was an American paper manufacturer and Democratic politician. He served as the 8th and 10th mayor of Appleton, Wisconsin, and 5th mayor of Portage, Wisconsin, and represented Outagamie County for four years in the Wisconsin Legislature. During the American Civil War, he served as a Union Army cavalry officer.

== Background ==
Born in Hillsdale, New York, Richmond was the son of Peleg Sisson Richmond and Margaret (Soule) Richmond. He received an academic education and went into the milling business in Sheffield, Massachusetts. He married Sarah Hillyer (1825–1905) on April 30, 1843. He came to Wisconsin in 1850, and settled in Milwaukee for a while before moving to Portage in 1851 where he served six years on the Portage Common Council and two years as mayor. During the American Civil War, Richmond served in the 2nd Wisconsin Cavalry Regiment as a company captain and later as major of the 3rd battalion. He participated in the captures of Vicksburg and Jackson, Mississippi, and several minor battles in the western theater of the war.

== After the Civil War ==
In 1865, Richmond moved to Appleton. He was twice elected as a Liberal Democrat/Liberal Reform Party member of the Wisconsin State Assembly from Outagamie County for 1874, and for 1875; served three years as mayor of Appleton, and in 1877 was elected to the Wisconsin State Senate as a Democrat (the Reform Party was dissolving by that point), with 3,658 votes against 1,642 for Greenbacker J. L. Pringle.

He died January 4, 1896, in Tacoma, Washington, and is buried in Tacoma Cemetery.

Wisconsin State Assembly
Preceded by John A. Roemer	Member of the Wisconsin State Assembly from the Outagamie district January 5, 1874 – January 3, 1876	Succeeded by David Hammel
Wisconsin Senate
Preceded by James Ryan	Member of the Wisconsin Senate from the 22nd district January 7, 1878 – January 5, 1880	Succeeded by Benjamin F. Carter
Political offices
Preceded by John P. McGregor	Mayor of Portage, Wisconsin; April 1860 – April 1862	Succeeded by Alvin B. Alden
Preceded by Robert R. Bateman	Mayor of Appleton, Wisconsin; April 1868 – April 1870	Succeeded by A. L. Smith
Preceded by A. L. Smith	Mayor of Appleton, Wisconsin; April 1871 – April 1872	Succeeded by Ephriam C. Goff
