= Bernard Schlichting =

American politician

Bernard Schlichting (January 2, 1838 – January 3, 1884) was a member of the Wisconsin State Assembly. During the American Civil War, he originally enlisted with the 9th Michigan Volunteer Infantry Regiment of the Union Army. Later, he was commissioned captain of Company C, 45th Wisconsin Infantry Regiment. He died suddenly on January 3, 1884, in Milwaukee, Wisconsin.

== Assembly career ==
Schlichting was a member of the Assembly during the 1875 session. He was a Republican.
