= Judson Prentice =

American politician

Member of the Wisconsin Senate from the 22nd district
- In office January 12, 1853 – January 11, 1854
- Preceded by: Position Established
- Succeeded by: Ezra A. Bowen

Member of the Wisconsin Senate from the 10th district
- In office January 14, 1852 – January 12, 1853
- Preceded by: James Giddings
- Succeeded by: Marvin H. Bovee

Personal details
- Born: March 2, 1810 Oriskany Falls, New York, U.S.
- Died: July 27, 1886 (aged 76) Watertown, Wisconsin
- Party: Whig
- Spouse(s): Almira Woodruff^{(died 1844)} Olive Thompson^{(m. 1848; died 1900)}
- Children: 2 with Almira Woodruff; Lawrence J. Elizabeth; 5 with Olive Thompson; Thomas J. Millard F. Lucy^{(b. 1853; died 1853)} Bertha^{(b. 1856; died 1868)} George Clifford^{(b. 1858)}
- Profession: Farmer, Surveyor

Judson Prentice (March 2, 1810 – July 27, 1886) was a member of the Wisconsin State Senate.

== Biography ==
Prentice was born in Oriskany Falls, Oneida County, New York, to Lucy Stafford and Thomas Prentice. He lived in Erie County, New York for 30 years, where he met and married his first wife, Almira Woodruff. They had two children together before her death in July 1844. Shortly after her death, Prentice moved to Trenton, Dodge County, in the Wisconsin Territory, before eventually settling in Watertown, Wisconsin.

In 1848, Prentice married Olive Thompson, a Congregationalist from Riga, New York. They would have five children.

== Career ==
Prentice represented Dodge County in the Wisconsin State Senate for two years. In 1852, as the senator from the 10th District, and in 1853, after redistricting, as the senator from the 22nd District. Additionally, he was an alderman of Watertown, Wisconsin, Surveyor of Dodge County, and a justice of the peace. He was a member of the Whig Party.

Prentice died in Watertown at the age of 78.
