= John McMullen (politician) =

American politician (1843–1922)

Member of canada

John McMullen (October 7, 1843 – April 5, 1922) was a member of the Wisconsin State Senate.

== Biography ==
McMullen was born on October 7, 1843, in Kingston, Province of Canada. He moved to Chilton, Wisconsin, in 1855 and attended the University of Wisconsin-Madison and the University of Michigan. He died in Chilton on April 5, 1922.

== Career ==
McMullen was a member of the Senate from the 15th district from 1895 to 1898. Previously, he was District Attorney of Calumet County, Wisconsin, from 1868 to 1878. He was a Democrat.
