= William Kennedy (Wisconsin politician) =

American politician and lawyer

Member of the Wisconsin State Senate
- In office 1885–1894

Personal details
- Born: January 1, 1841 County Limerick, Ireland
- Died: November 19, 1910 (aged 69) Oshkosh, Wisconsin, United States
- Party: Democratic
- Occupation: Politician, lawyer

William Kennedy (January 1, 1841 – November 19, 1910) was an American politician and lawyer.

Born in County Limerick, Ireland, Kennedy moved to Whitewater, Wisconsin and then Janesville, Wisconsin. In 1871, he settled in Appleton, Wisconsin. He served as District Attorney of Outagamie County, Wisconsin. Then from 1885 until 1894, Kennedy served in the Wisconsin State Senate as a Democrat. He was committed to Northern State Hospital for the Insane on Asylum Bay north of Oshkosh in 1907, where he died in 1910.
