= WOMT-FM =

Simulcasting WOMT Manitowoc
- Two Rivers, Wisconsin; United States
- Broadcast area: Manitowoc County and Sheboygan County
- Frequency: 98.9 MHz
- Branding: WOMT 1240 AM 98.9 FM

Programming
- Format: Adult contemporary; full service
- Affiliations: ABC News Radio

Ownership
- Owner: Mark Seehafer; (Seehafer Broadcasting Corporation)
- Sister stations: WCUB, WLKN, WLTU, WOMT, WQTC

History
- First air date: December 7, 2013 (two-day program test authority); December 7, 2014; 11 years ago (official launch); (as WEMP)
- Former call signs: WEMP (2013-2026)
- Call sign meaning: Heritage call sign formerly used by WSSP Milwaukee

Technical information
- Licensing authority: FCC
- Facility ID: 85300
- Class: A
- ERP: 6,000 watts
- HAAT: 89.4 meters

Links
- Public license information: Public file; LMS
- Webcast: Listen Live
- Website: www.womtradio.com

WOMT-FM (98.9 FM) is an FM radio station licensed to Two Rivers, Wisconsin carrying a full service adult contemporary format. The station transmits from the WLKN tower in Newton and covers the Manitowoc–Two Rivers market, along with eastern Sheboygan County, including Sheboygan. The station is owned by Mark Seehafer through Seehafer Broadcasting Corporation, which is the station's licensee. The station's allocation has been proposed by the FCC since 1996, going through three owners who failed to build the facilities before previous owner Mark Heller's purchase of the license in 2013.

== History ==
The station began broadcasting via program test authority on the evening of December 7, 2013 at 10pm, broadcasting until December 9 at midnight, using a limited hour loop of easy listening music with some Christmas music mixed in due to music licensing concerns, along with weather and sports updates and small talk from Heller, and pre-recorded station identifications done by WGN's Orion Samuelson and Max Armstrong. Also part of the PTA were several jingles from the original WEMP in Milwaukee during their prime in the 1960s; the WEMP call letters were coincidentally made available when the last holder in New York City re-called their station in mid-2012 during a transition period to a new format and eventual new owners.

The PTA happened nine days ahead of the expiration of the station's construction permit after the station's original plan to build a new tower in Newton was rejected by the town board. The test was performed using the studio facilities of Cleveland's WLKN (98.1), along with their antenna and transmitter just west of Newton. WLKN went off the air to allow the PTA to go forward, and also streamed the PTA in full using their website. The test ended with the signal re-tuned to 98.1 and WLKN's programming resuming as scheduled.

WEMP began permanent service a year later on December 7, 2014, broadcasting from the WLKN tower with its current format, and remained commercial free during a testing period. The station was simulcast on their sister station New Holstein-licensed WLAK (1530), which operates as a daytime-only signal. WEMP utilized the basement studio of WLKN, along with sharing their post office box for correspondence their first few months on the air.

In February 2015, limited commercial advertising began, along with the addition of top-of-the-hour newscasts from ABC News Radio and half-hour weather updates. The station was sold by Heller to Seehafer Broadcasting in June 2015 and moved their operations to the WOMT facility in Manitowoc, with no major changes to the format or commercial scheduling. The WLAK simulcast was dropped shortly thereafter with the end of common ownership. WLKN would itself move to Manitowoc two years later with Seehafer's purchase of the Cub Radio stations and consolidation of Seehafer's five area stations into one facility.

On February 1, 2026, WEMP changed from easy listening to a simulcast of its AM sister station WOMT, which airs a full-service adult contemporary format. In addition, the station's call letters changed to WOMT-FM. Broadcasts of University of Wisconsin sports and the Green Bay Packers will move to WQTC, while WOMT will continue airing the Milwaukee Bucks, Milwaukee Brewers and high school sports.
