= Fred Schmitz =

American politician

Fred. "Fritz" Schmitz (December 25, 1820 – February 8, 1905) was an American musician and farmer from Northeim, Wisconsin who served a single term as a Reform Party member of the Wisconsin State Assembly from Manitowoc County.

== Background ==
Schmitz was born in Hamm, Province of Westphalia in Prussia on December 25, 1820, to a "well-situated" family. He was educated in a city school. In 1847 he came to the United States with two of his brothers. The Schmitz brothers, all musically trained, joined the orchestra of an itinerant theatre company and travelled throughout the United States. They came to Wisconsin in 1848 and settled in Northeim, a hamlet in the Town of Newton in Manitowoc County, where they bought neighboring tracts of land and became farmers. On January 31, Fred married Johanna Gröll, and one of his brothers married one of Johanna's sisters. In addition to founding the county's first musical group, at one point Fred served as a teacher in the town's school.

== Public office ==
Schmitz was elected chairman of the Town of Newton in 1851, 1855, 1857, 1860, 1861, and 1870–73; town superintendent of schools in 1856–58; town clerk in 1865–68, county supervisor for a number of terms (serving as chairman of the board in 1868), and justice of the peace in 1873.

In 1874 he was elected to the first Manitowoc County Assembly district (the Towns of Centerville, Eaton, Liberty, Meeme, Newton, Schleswig and Rockland) as a member of the Reform Party (a short-lived coalition of Democrats, reform and Liberal Republicans, and Grangers formed in 1873), with 922 votes against 495 for regular Republican John Voss (Democratic incumbent Charles Rudolph Zorn was not a candidate). He was assigned to the standing committee on agriculture.

The Assembly's redistricting of 1876 changed the assembly districts of the county. Cato, Maple Grove and Franklin were moved from the second district to the first, and Centerville and Newton were taken from the first and added to the third. Schmitz chose not to be a candidate for re-election in 1876, and was succeeded by Democrat Thomas Thornton.

== After the Assembly ==
Schmitz continued to serve on the County Board on and off as late as 1885. In 1887, he is reported as the secretary of Newton's town mutual fire insurance company.; and still held that position for what was now the Mutual Farmers' Fire Insurance Company in 1894

Johanna died in the mid-1890s, and the aging Schmitz retired and moved into the home of his daughter and son-in-law in Manitowoc, He died there February 8, 1905.
