= WLKN =

- Cleveland, Wisconsin; United States
- Broadcast area: Sheboygan/Manitowoc, Wisconsin
- Frequency: 98.1 MHz
- Branding: Lake 98.1

Programming
- Format: Adult contemporary

Ownership
- Owner: Seehafer Broadcasting Corporation
- Sister stations: WCUB, WEMP, WLTU, WOMT, WQTC

History
- First air date: 1985; 41 years ago (as WKTT at 103.1)
- Former call signs: WKTT (1984–2003)
- Former frequencies: 103.1 MHz (1985–1993)
- Call sign meaning: Lake Ninety-eight

Technical information
- Licensing authority: FCC
- Facility ID: 67716
- Class: A
- ERP: 5,800 watts
- HAAT: 89 meters (292 feet)
- Transmitter coordinates: 43°59′03″N 87°45′55″W
- Translator: 103.5 W278BQ (Manitowoc)

Links
- Public license information: Public file; LMS
- Webcast: Listen Live
- Website: wlkn.com

WLKN (98.1 FM, "Lake 98.1") is a radio station licensed to Cleveland, Wisconsin with an adult contemporary format consisting mainly of music from the 1980s until the current day, serving the lakeshore cities of Sheboygan and Manitowoc/Two Rivers, Wisconsin, along with Manitowoc and Sheboygan Counties in general. The station's studio is located in Manitowoc, and the station is owned by Seehafer Broadcasting. The station's transmitter is located north of Cleveland, in the Town of Newton.

The station has some interference within Manitowoc and Two Rivers proper with two stations on adjacent frequencies from Green Bay, WTAQ-FM (97.7) and WQLH (98.5). Because of this, WLKN simulcasts using an FM translator station, W278BQ, at 103.5 FM to serve those cities from the WOMT transmitter site. That translator is separately owned by Magnum Media, which has entered into several sales to Seehafer Broadcasting in the 2020s.

== History ==
The station was formerly WKTT "Kat Country" prior to a format change in 2003, and had been at 103.1 before a frequency change in 1993 in conjunction with WWJR in Sheboygan from 97.7 to 93.7 to facilitate the launch of Kaukauna's WOGB on 103.1. There were more than six FM's affected by the frequency switch, at the time.

On October 9, 2009 after a sale for $600,000 and a four-year consulting fee of $25,000 annually from former owner Radio K-T, Inc. headed by former Clear Channel programmer Jack Taddeo, the station came under the ownership of Seehafer Broadcasting, a locally-run company based in Manitowoc which has owned WOMT (1240) and WQTC-FM (102.3) for decades. Seehafer continues to base WLKN at their Cleveland offices, along with utilizing the station's web provider to create a more state-of-the-art website presence for the latter stations under WLKN's existing Internet technology agreement. Beyond usual staff turnover, WLKN's programming format, which is female orientated and schedule have remained unchanged since the sale, though overflow local high school basketball games are carried on WLKN, especially during the playoff season. Since the WLKN conversion the station airs an all-Christmas music format through the holidays from Thanksgiving Day to December 26.

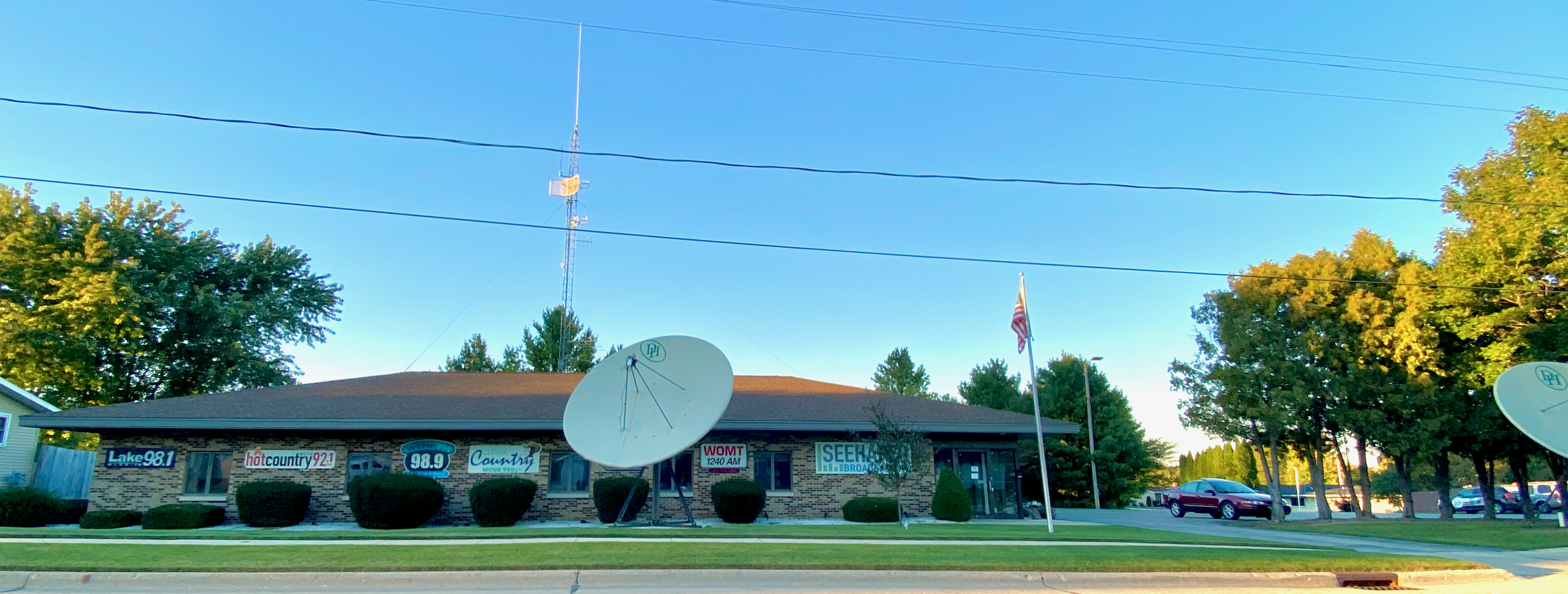
WLKN's studios in Manitowoc, shared with its four sister stations.

At the end of 2013, WLKN allowed a new Two Rivers-licensed station, WEMP (98.9), to undergo a one-day program test authority period using their studios and transmitter in order to maintain the license. This arrangement eventually had WEMP launch full operations in December 2014, using the WLKN tower to host their transmitter, along with leasing studio space in the basement of WLKN's facility and access to WLKN's post office box to launch the station with their assistance. WEMP was run by its owner, Mark Heller until he sold the station in August 2015 to Seehafer, and the operations for the station were moved to the WOMT/WQTC facilities on Mangin Street in Manitowoc. Seehafer also purchased WCUB and WLTU-FM, after closing on the WEMP purchase. WLKN's operations were moved to the Mangin facility in November 2016, ending 30 years of operation direct from Cleveland.

== Programming ==
Notable programming includes syndicated evening host Delilah, and the Sunday morning "Dave Koz Radio Show", home improvement tips from Chicago-based do-it-yourself expert Lou Manfredini, The Lou Dobbs Financial Report from the Salem Radio Network, and the Saturday morning Shopping Spree program, which features half-off deals from local merchants and was brought over by former program director Barry Hersch to fill the need for such a program after his former station, WHBL canceled the program in the late 1990s under the title Name Your Price as brokered weekend syndicated programming became popular.

The station is managed by Dave Jetzer. The station is voicetracked by local personalities for shifts outside of the station's morning show, hosted by Sandi Davis.
