= Meggers, Wisconsin =

- Unincorporated community
- Location within Wisconsin Location within the United States
- Coordinates: 43°58′20″N 88°02′29″W
- Country: United States
- State: Wisconsin
- Counties: Calumet, Manitowoc
- Towns: New Holstein, Schleswig
- Elevation: 896 ft (273 m)
- Time zone: UTC-6 (Central (CST))
  - Summer (DST): UTC-5 (CDT)
- Area code: 920
- GNIS feature ID: 1577724

Meggers is an unincorporated community located in the town of New Holstein in Calumet County and the town of Schleswig in Manitowoc County, in the U.S. state of Wisconsin. The community was named for Andrew Meggers, who had purchased an area store and tavern from one Ferdinand Rice.
