= WQTC-FM =

- Manitowoc, Wisconsin; United States
- Broadcast area: Manitowoc-Two Rivers; Manitowoc County
- Frequency: 102.3 MHz
- Branding: Q102, The Rock on the Shore

Programming
- Format: Classic rock
- Affiliations: Dial Global Classic Rock Network

Ownership
- Owner: Seehafer Broadcasting Corporation
- Sister stations: WCUB, WEMP, WLKN, WLTU, WOMT

History
- First air date: 1965
- Call sign meaning: Q (common radio branding), Manitowoc & Two Rivers are "twin cities"

Technical information
- Licensing authority: FCC
- Facility ID: 59609
- Class: A
- ERP: 4,500 watts
- HAAT: 100 meters (330 ft)
- Transmitter coordinates: 44°7′31.00″N 87°37′41.00″W

Links
- Public license information: Public file; LMS
- Website: wqtcfm.com

WQTC-FM (102.3 FM, "Classic Rock Q102") is a radio station licensed to Manitowoc, Wisconsin, owned by Seehafer Broadcasting Corporation and serves that community, along with the nearby twin city of Two Rivers and Sheboygan. A sister station to WOMT (1240), WQTC-FM broadcasts the satellite format of Dial Global's Classic Rock Network during most programming hours, along with local news and weather cut-ins by WOMT staff and local high school sports, mainly the teams of Two Rivers High School to complement WOMT's coverage of the Manitowoc high school teams.

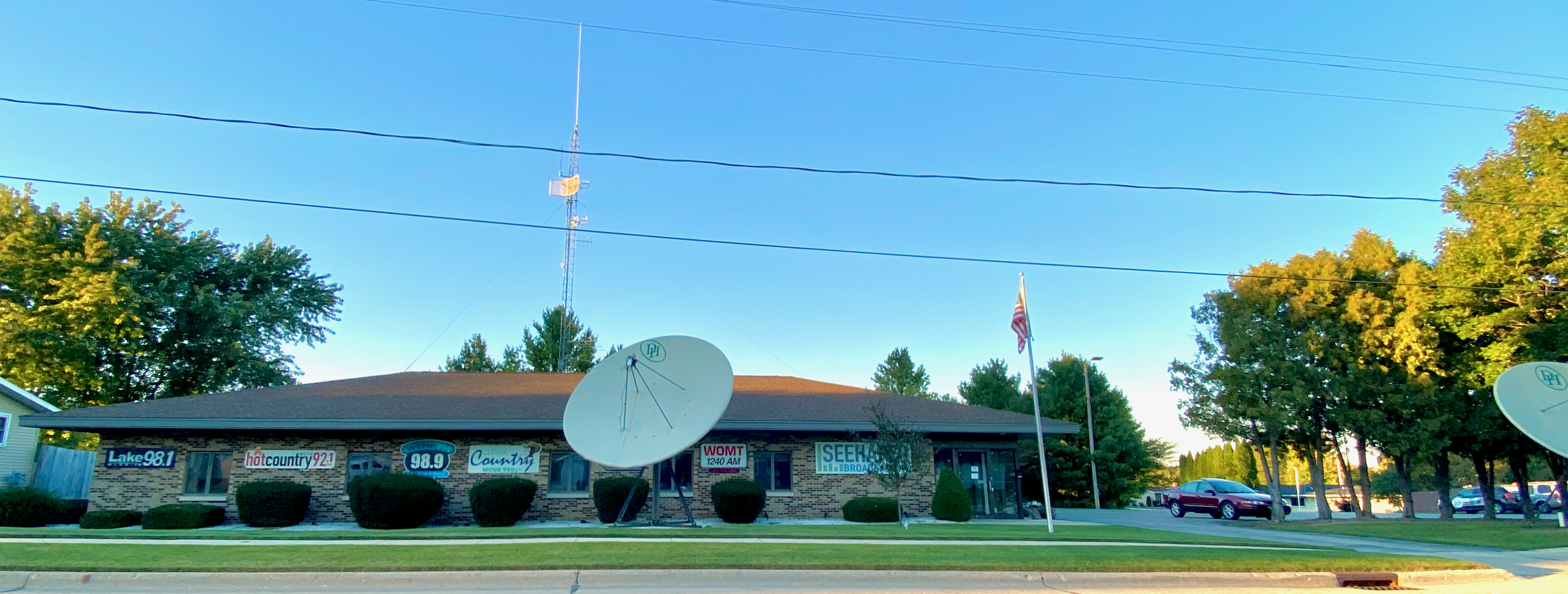
WQTC's studios in Manitowoc, shared with its four sister stations.

In 2009, WOMT and WQTC-FM gained another sister station in Cleveland's WLKN-FM (98.1), whose operations moved to Manitowoc on August 31, 2016. In November 2015, Seehafer Broadcasting purchased longtime local competitors WLTU and WCUB.

A minor tweak in the format came in 2013 when WQTC switched from airing Dial Global's Classic Hits network to their Classic Rock network; a converse change of slogan and logo to Classic Rock Q102 was made with the change.

Broadcasts of University of Wisconsin sports and the Green Bay Packers moved from WOMT to WQTC in 2026.
