= New Holstein =

New Holstein is the name of two places in the state of Wisconsin in the United States:

- New Holstein, Wisconsin, a city in Calumet County
- New Holstein (town), Wisconsin, a town surrounding the city
