= Duveneck =

Duveneck may refer to:

- Duveneck, Wisconsin, US
- Frank Duveneck (1848–1919), American painter
