= Ben H. Mahon =

American politician

Member of the Wisconsin Senate from the 9th district
- In office January 1, 1923 – October 25, 1924
- Preceded by: David V. Jennings
- Succeeded by: Irving P. Mehigan

Member of the Wisconsin State Assembly from the Milwaukee 1st district
- In office January 1, 1917 – January 1, 1923
- Preceded by: Jacob J. Killa
- Succeeded by: Thomas H. Conway

Personal details
- Born: April 15, 1888 Liberty, Manitowoc County, Wisconsin, U.S.
- Died: October 25, 1924 (aged 36) Milwaukee, Wisconsin, U.S.
- Party: Republican
- Relatives: Thomas J. Mahon (brother)
- Occupation: Politician

Ben H. Mahon (April 15, 1888 – October 25, 1924) was a member of the Wisconsin State Assembly from 1916 to 1922 and the Wisconsin State Senate from the 1922 to his death in 1924.

== Early life ==
Ben H. Mahon was born on April 15, 1888, in Liberty, Manitowoc County, Wisconsin. He attended public schools in Milwaukee and the Milwaukee Medical College.

== Career ==
Mahon worked at circulation departments in Milwaukee newspapers. He also worked in the insurance and real estate business in Milwaukee. In 1913, he worked as a deputy state treasury agent.

Mahon was elected to the Wisconsin State Assembly in 1916 and re-elected in 1920. He represented the 1st District. In 1922, he was elected to the Wisconsin State Senate and remained a member until his death. He was a Republican.

== Personal life ==
Mahon's brother, Thomas J. Mahon, was also a member of the Assembly.

== Death ==
Mahon died on October 25, 1924, at his home in Milwaukee from tuberculosis. On January 22, 1925, the Senate passed a resolution for a memorial in Mahon's name.
