= Peter Reuther =

19th century American politician

Member of the Wisconsin State Assembly from the Manitowoc 1st district
- In office January 1, 1872 – January 6, 1873
- Preceded by: Svend Samuelson
- Succeeded by: Charles Rudolph Zorn

Personal details
- Born: February 8, 1836 Laubach, Grand Duchy of Hesse
- Died: August 6, 1905 (aged 69) Brillion, Wisconsin, U.S.
- Resting place: Brillion Township Cemetery, Brillion, Wisconsin
- Party: Republican
- Spouse: Augusta Rossberg
- Children: Louis Reuther^{(b. 1861; died 1922)}; George C. Reuther^{(b. 1864; died 1928)}; Henrietta A. (Schlichting)^{(b. 1867; died 1942)}; Louise R. (Andrews)^{(b. 1869; died 1966)}; Otto Frederick Reuther^{(b. 1871; died 1944)}; Sara Reuther^{(b. 1875; died 1957)}; Emil J. Reuther^{(b. 1879; died 1955)}

Military service
- Allegiance: United States
- Branch/service: United States Volunteers; Union Army
- Years of service: 1864–1865
- Rank: 1st Sergeant, USV
- Unit: 45th Reg. Wis. Vol. Infantry
- Battles/wars: American Civil War

Peter Reuther (February 8, 1836 – August 6, 1905) was a German American immigrant, carpenter, and Republican politician. He was a member of the Wisconsin State Assembly, representing southern Manitowoc County during the 1872 session.

== Biography ==
Reuther was born on February 8, 1836, in Laubach, in the Grand Duchy of Hesse (now central Germany). He emigrated to the United States with his parents in 1854, settling first in Sheboygan, Wisconsin. At Sheboygan, Reuther went to work as a carpenter and soon moved to the town of Centerville, Manitowoc County, Wisconsin, where he was a contractor. He also became involved in local politics in Centerville, and was elected to seven terms as town clerk.

During the fourth year of the American Civil War, Reuther was drafted into the Union Army and was enrolled in Company B of the 45th Wisconsin Infantry Regiment. Reuther was promoted to first sergeant shortly after the regiment mustered into federal service. The 45th Wisconsin Infantry was sent to Nashville, Tennessee, and remained there on guard duty until the end of the war.

Reuther returned from the war and became involved with the Republican Party of Wisconsin. He was elected to the Wisconsin State Assembly in 1871, running on the Republican Party ticket. During the 1872 session, he represented Manitowoc County's first Assembly district, which then comprised roughly the southern half of the county. He ran for re-election in 1872, but was defeated by Democrat Charles Rudolph Zorn. He was twice a candidate for sheriff, but was not elected.

Later in life he moved to Brillion, Wisconsin, in Calumet County, where he worked as a liquor wholesaler and retailer. He was also elected commander of Grand Army of the Republic post 222.

He died at his home in Brillion on August 6, 1905.

== Personal life and family ==
Peter Reuther was the fourth of five children born to George Reuther and his wife Anna Margaretha (née Mickel). Reuther's parents and all five children emigrated to the United States. His younger brother, Jacob, served in the 5th Pennsylvania Cavalry Regiment in the Civil War.

Peter Reuther married Augusta Rossberg, another German immigrant, on October 28, 1861. They had seven children. His second son, George, later served as register of deeds for Manitowoc County.

== Electoral history ==
=== Wisconsin Assembly (1871, 1872) ===
Wisconsin Assembly, Manitowoc 1st District Election, 1871
Party	Candidate	Votes	%	±%
General Election, November 7, 1871
Republican	Peter Reuther	669	64.58%	−3.42%
Democratic	Oliver Schunk	367	35.42%	
Plurality		302	29.15%	-6.83%
Total votes		1,036	100.0%	-22.34%
Republican hold				

Wisconsin Assembly, Manitowoc 1st District Election, 1872
Party	Candidate	Votes	%	±%
General Election, November 5, 1872
Democratic	Charles Rudolph Zorn	738	50.34%	
Republican	Peter Reuther (incumbent)	728	49.66%	−14.92%
Plurality		10	0.68%	-28.47%
Total votes		1,466	100.0%	+41.51%
Democratic gain from Republican				

Wisconsin State Assembly
Preceded by Svend Samuelson	Member of the Wisconsin State Assembly from the Manitowoc 1st district January 1, 1872 – January 6, 1873	Succeeded by Charles Rudolph Zorn
