= Daniel Tracy =

Daniel Tracy may refer to:

- Daniel Tracy (politician) (1843–1919), American business leader and politician
- Daniel W. Tracy (1886–1955), American labor union leader
- Daniel Tracy, drummer with Deafheaven
