= Svend Samuelson =

19th century American politician

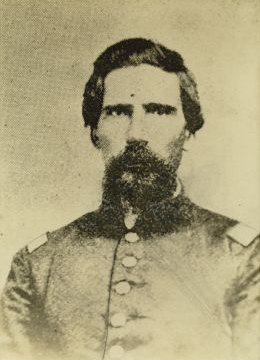
- from Wisconsin Historical Society collection

Member of the Wisconsin State Assembly from the Manitowoc 1st district
- In office January 2, 1871 – January 1, 1872
- Preceded by: John Barth
- Succeeded by: Peter Reuther

Personal details
- Born: January 24, 1825 Christiania, Norway
- Died: January 15, 1891 (aged 65) Sturgeon Bay, Wisconsin, U.S.
- Resting place: Bayside Cemetery, Sturgeon Bay
- Party: Republican
- Spouse: Hannah Samuelson (m. 1864–1891)
- Children: Emilie Christine Samuelson^{(b. 1866; died 1879)}; Alfred C. Samuelson^{(b. 1872; died 1952)}; Jennie (Trodahl)^{(b. 1874; died 1967)}; Alice Samuelson^{(b. 1877; died 1972)}; Olive Charlotte Samuelson^{(b. 1879; died 1953)}; Norman Samuelson^{(b. 1881; died 1961)}; 4 others

Military service
- Allegiance: United States
- Branch/service: United States Volunteers; Union Army
- Years of service: 1862–1863
- Rank: 2nd Lieutenant, USV
- Unit: 15th Reg. Wis. Vol. Infantry
- Battles/wars: American Civil War

Svend Samuelson (January 24, 1825 – January 15, 1891) was a Norwegian American immigrant, farmer, and Republican politician. He was a member of the Wisconsin State Assembly, representing Manitowoc County in the 1871 session.

== Biography ==
Samuelson was born in Christiania, Norway, in January 1825. He received a common school education and emigrated to the United States, settling in the town of Liberty, in Manitowoc County, Wisconsin, in 1854. He established a farm there, and served for more than ten years as town clerk.

At the outbreak of the American Civil War, he volunteered for service in the Union Army with the 15th Wisconsin Infantry Regiment, frequently referred to as the "Scandinavian Regiment" due to being mostly composed of recent Scandinavian American immigrants. Samuelson was commissioned second lieutenant of Company F in the regiment while it was being organized at Camp Randall, in Madison. The 15th Wisconsin Infantry operated in the western theater of the war, and saw significant combat in Kentucky and Tennessee. Samuelson served for nearly two years, but resigned in the fall of 1863 due to poor health.

Samuelson returned to Manitowoc County after the war. He was elected to the Wisconsin State Assembly in the 1870 election, running on the Republican Party ticket. He represented Manitowoc County's 1st Assembly district in the 1871 legislative session. At that time, his district comprised roughly the southern half of the county. He did not run for re-election in 1871.

He moved from Manitowoc to Sturgeon Bay, Wisconsin, around 1875. He died at his home in Sturgeon Bay on the morning of January 15, 1891, after suffering many years from an incurable lung disease, stemming from his years in the war.

== Electoral history ==
=== Wisconsin Assembly (1870) ===
Wisconsin Assembly, Manitowoc 1st District Election, 1870
Party	Candidate	Votes	%	±%
General Election, November 8, 1870
Republican	Svend Samuelson	907	67.99%	+34.01%
Democratic	Henry Kolwey	427	32.01%	
Plurality		480	35.98%	+3.94%
Total votes		1,334	100.0%	+11.91%
Republican gain from Democratic				

Wisconsin State Assembly
Preceded by John Barth	Member of the Wisconsin State Assembly from the Manitowoc 1st district January 2, 1871 – January 1, 1872	Succeeded by Peter Reuther
