= Irving P. Mehigan =

American politician

Member of the Wisconsin Senate from the 9th district
- In office January 5, 1925 – January 7, 1935
- Preceded by: Ben H. Mahon
- Succeeded by: James L. Callan

Personal details
- Born: January 15, 1898 Milwaukee, Wisconsin, U.S.
- Died: August 4, 1980 (aged 89)
- Party: Republican
- Occupation: Politician; lawyer

Irving P. Mehigan (January 15, 1898 – August 4, 1980) was a member of the Wisconsin State Senate from 1924 to 1935.

== Biography ==
Irving P. Mehigan was born on January 15, 1898, in Milwaukee, Wisconsin. He graduated from Marquette Academy and the Marquette Law School in 1923.

== Career ==
Mehigan was elected to the Senate on December 30, 1924, in a special election following the death of Ben H. Mahon. He represented the 9th District from 1925 to 1935. He was a Republican and practiced law in Milwaukee.

== Death ==
Mehigan died of cancer on August 4, 1980.
