= Lutze Housebarn =

Historic house in Wisconsin, United States

- U.S. National Register of Historic Places
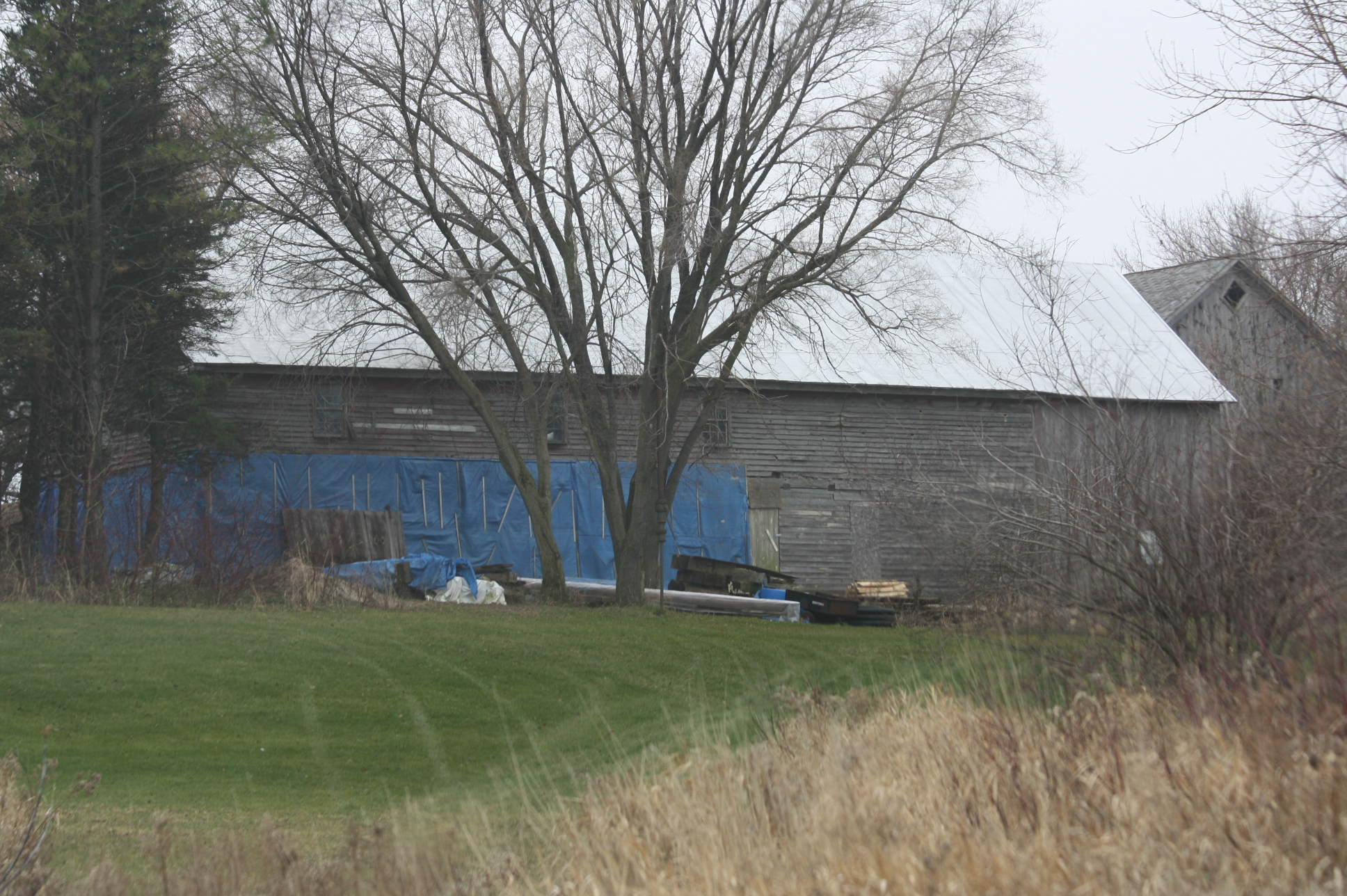
- Lutze Housebarn
- Location: 13634 S. Union Rd. Newton, Manitowoc County, Wisconsin
- Built: 1849
- NRHP reference No.: 84003702
- Added to NRHP: June 7, 1984

The Lutze Housebarn is a housebarn located in Newton, Manitowoc County, Wisconsin, United States. It was added to the National Register of Historic Places in 1984.

== History ==
The building was constructed by Gottlieb and Fredericka Lutze. It is one of three buildings of its kind in the United States.
