= Newton (community), Manitowoc County, Wisconsin =

Newton, Wisconsin
- Unincorporated community
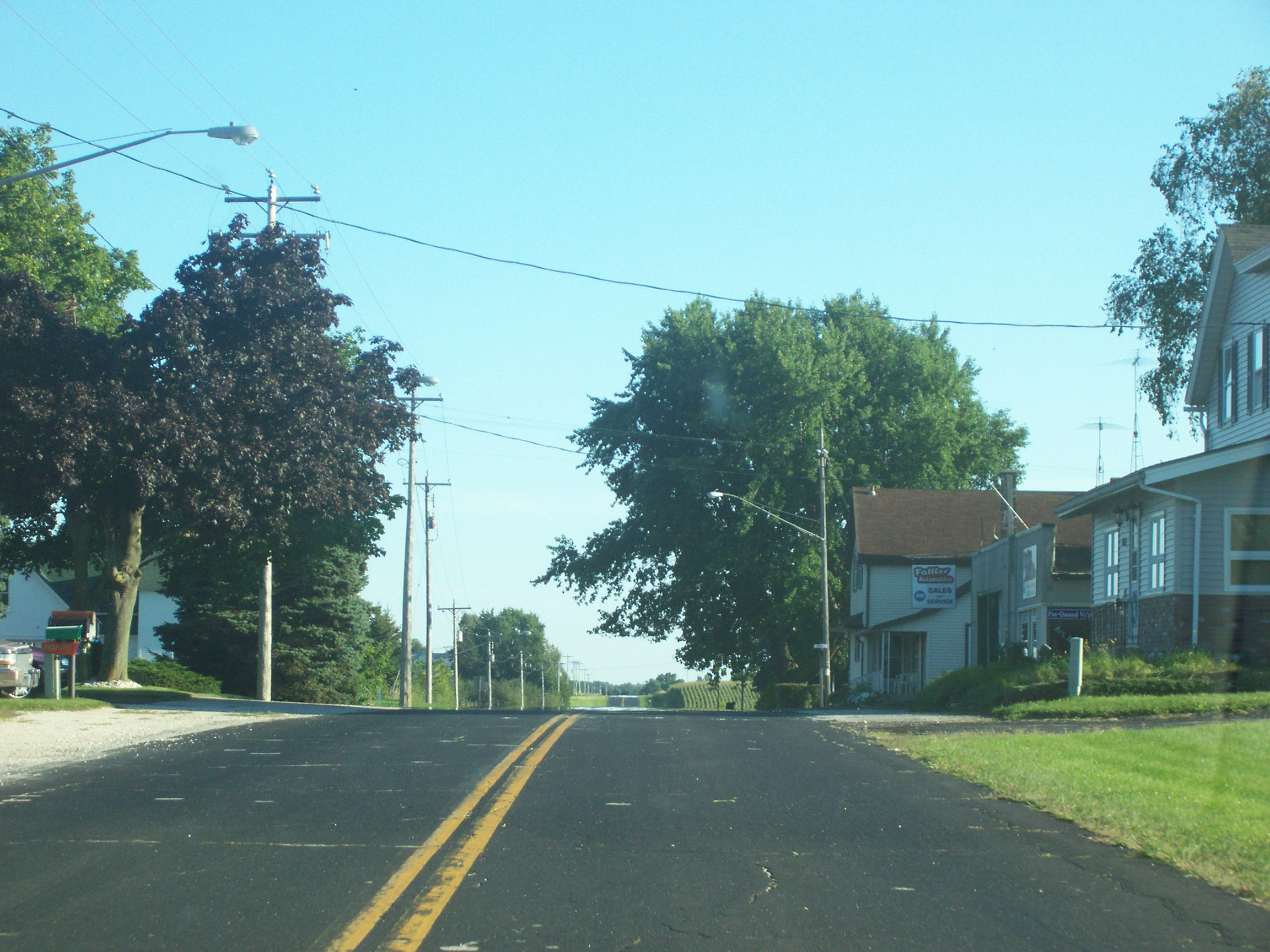
- Looking south in Newton

- Location within Wisconsin Location within the United States
- Coordinates: 43°59′38″N 87°43′35″W
- Country: United States
- State: Wisconsin
- County: Manitowoc
- Elevation: 659 ft (201 m)
- Time zone: UTC-6 (Central (CST))
  - Summer (DST): UTC-5 (CDT)
- ZIP code: 53063
- Area code: 920
- GNIS feature ID: 1570264

Newton is an unincorporated community located in the town of Newton, Manitowoc County, Wisconsin, United States. Newton is located along Interstate 43 near Exit 144, 5.5 miles (8.9 km) east-northeast of Cleveland. Newton has a post office with ZIP code 53063.

== History ==
The first post office in Newton was called Timothy, and was established in 1882. It was renamed Newton in 1930. The present name of the community is for John Newton, an officer of the American Revolutionary War.

In 2021, the Wisconsin Shipwreck Coast National Marine Sanctuary was established in the waters of Lake Michigan off Newton.
