= Northeim, Wisconsin =

- Unincorporated community
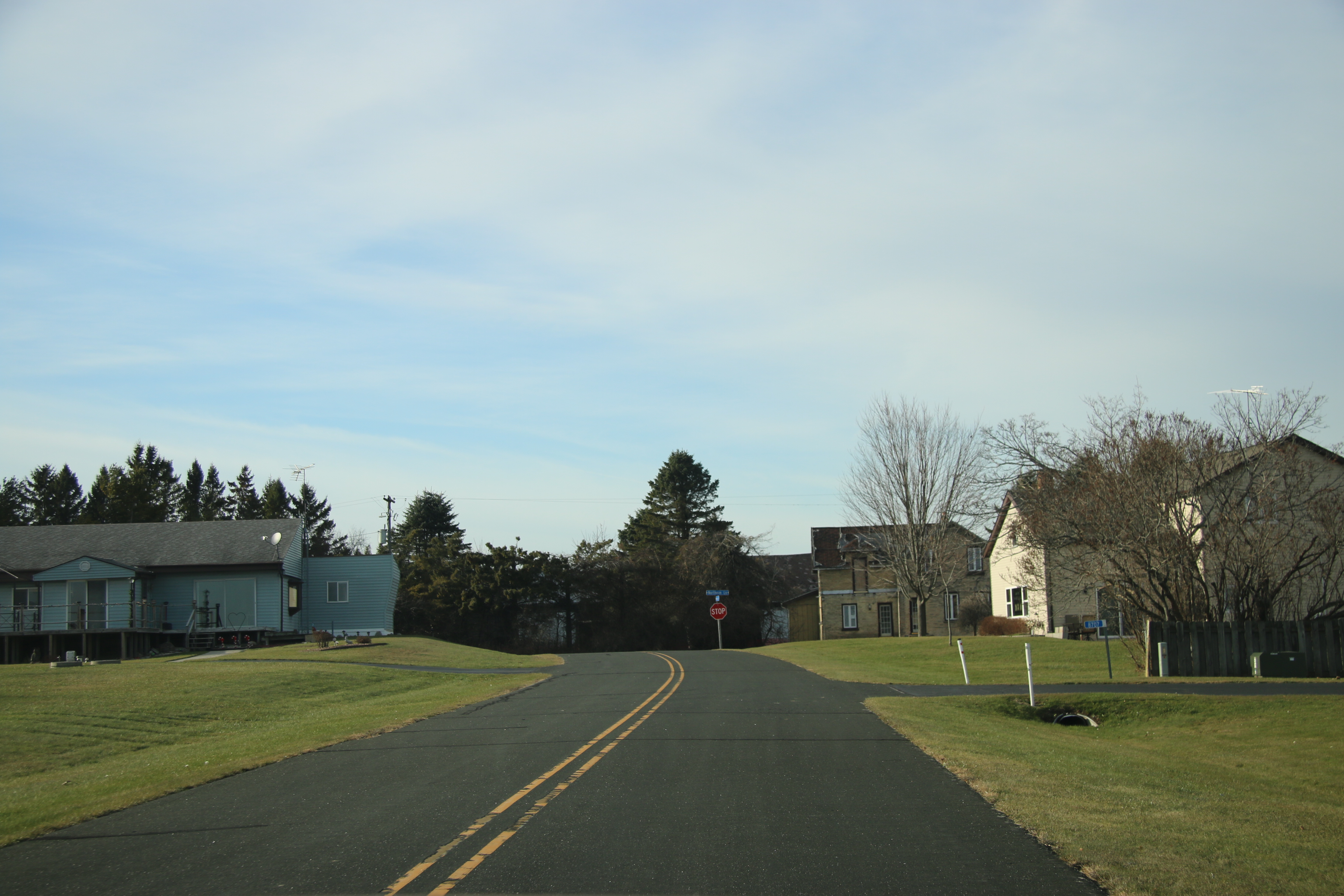
- Buildings in Northeim

- Location within Wisconsin Location within the United States
- Coordinates: 43°59′39″N 87°41′55″W
- Country: United States
- State: Wisconsin
- County: Manitowoc
- Elevation: 623 ft (190 m)
- Time zone: UTC-6 (Central (CST))
  - Summer (DST): UTC-5 (CDT)
- Area code: 920
- GNIS feature ID: 1570523

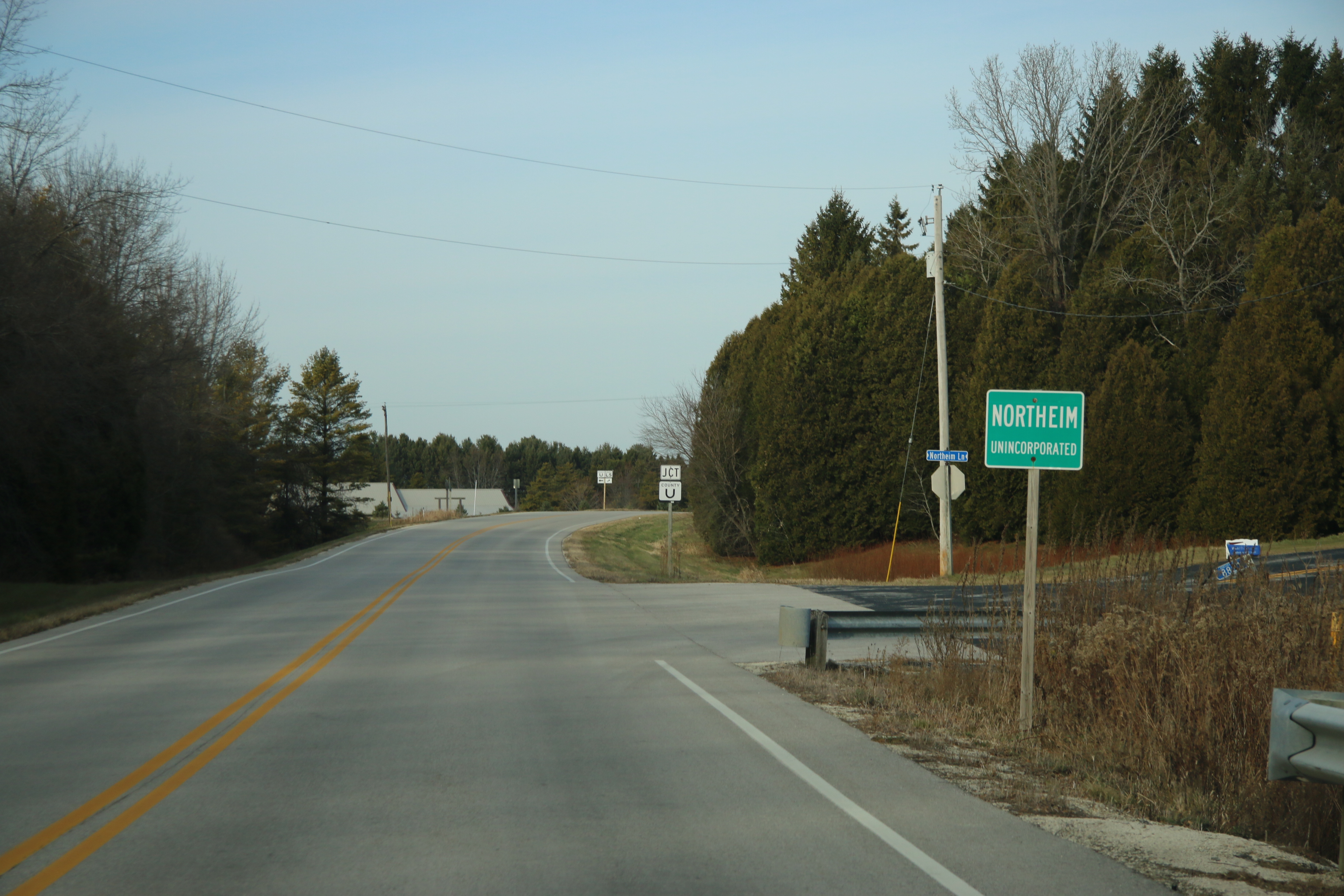
Sign

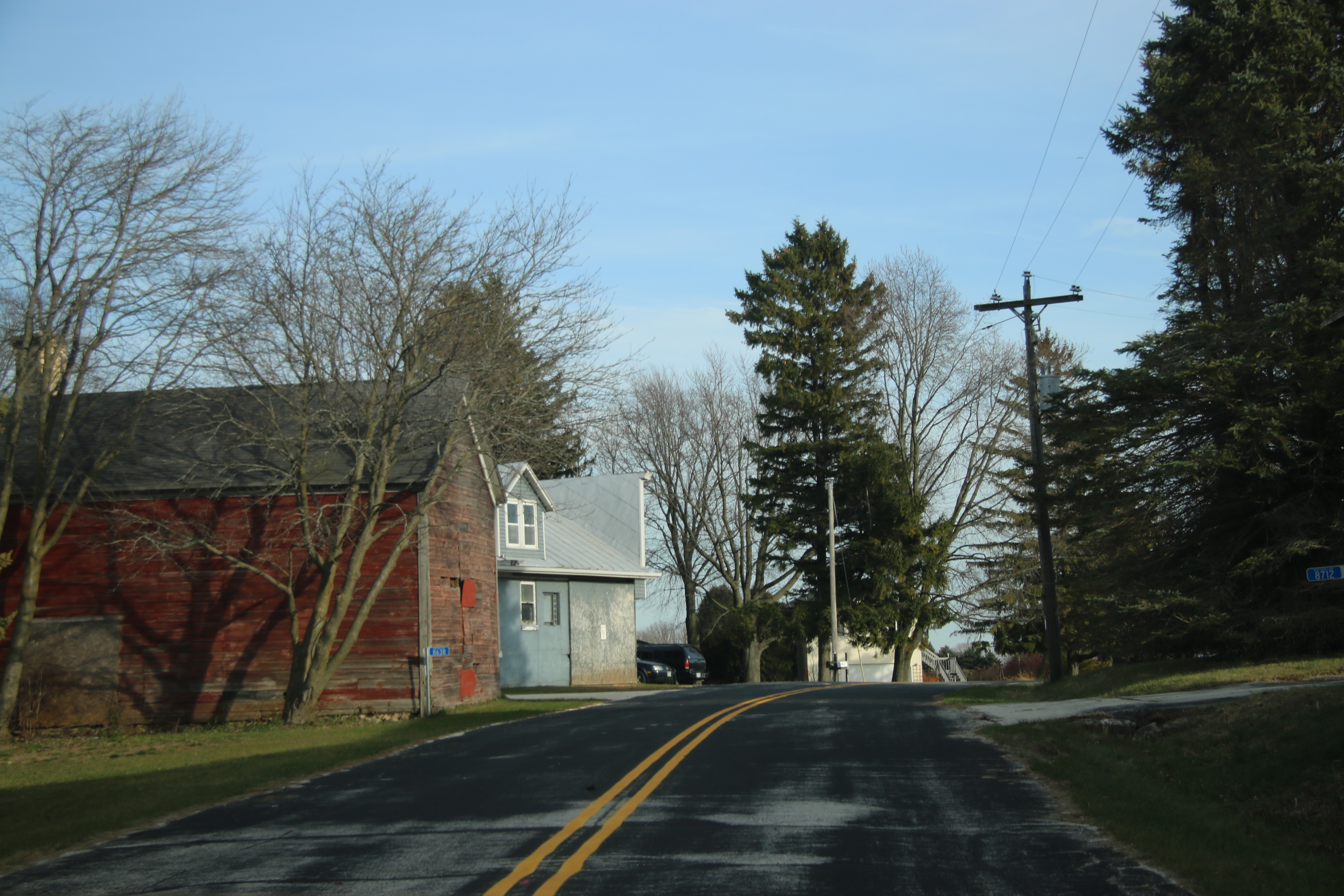
Buildings in Northeim

Northeim is an unincorporated community located in the town of Newton, Manitowoc County, Wisconsin, United States. Northeim is located on Pine Creek at the junction of County Highways U and LS, 6.8 miles (10.9 km) south-southwest of Manitowoc.

== Notable people ==
- Fred. "Fritz" Schmitz, farmer, musician and member of the Wisconsin State Assembly
