= David V. Jennings =

American politician

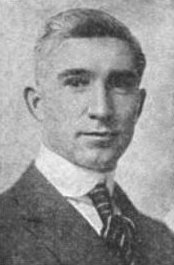

Member of the Wisconsin Senate from the 9th district
- In office 1914–1921
- Preceded by: Edward F. Kileen
- Succeeded by: Ben H. Mahon

Member of the Wisconsin State Assembly
- In office 1912–1914

Personal details
- Born: January 19, 1887 Keshena, Wisconsin, U.S.
- Died: November 27, 1970 (aged 83) Milwaukee, Wisconsin, U.S.
- Resting place: Holy Cross Cemetery
- Party: Democratic
- Education: Marquette University Law School
- Occupation: Politician; civil servant

David V. Jennings (January 19, 1887 – November 27, 1970) was a member of the Wisconsin State Assembly from 1912 to 1914 and the Wisconsin State Senate from 1914 to 1921.

== Biography ==
David V. Jennings was born in Keshena, Wisconsin on January 19, 1887. He moved to Milwaukee, Wisconsin in 1900. He graduated from Marquette Academy in 1904. Later, he attended Marquette University from 1904 to 1907. He graduated from Marquette University Law School in 1911 with a legal degree.

== Career ==
Jennings was elected to the Wisconsin State Assembly in 1912 and to the 9th District of the Wisconsin State Senate in 1914 as a Democrat. He served in the state senate until 1921. He also served as chief examiner for the Milwaukee County civil service commission, holding that position from January 1, 1918 until his resignation on January 27, 1948.

He died at Columbia Hospital in Milwaukee on November 27, 1970, and was buried at Holy Cross Cemetery.
