= Newtonburg, Wisconsin =

- Unincorporated community
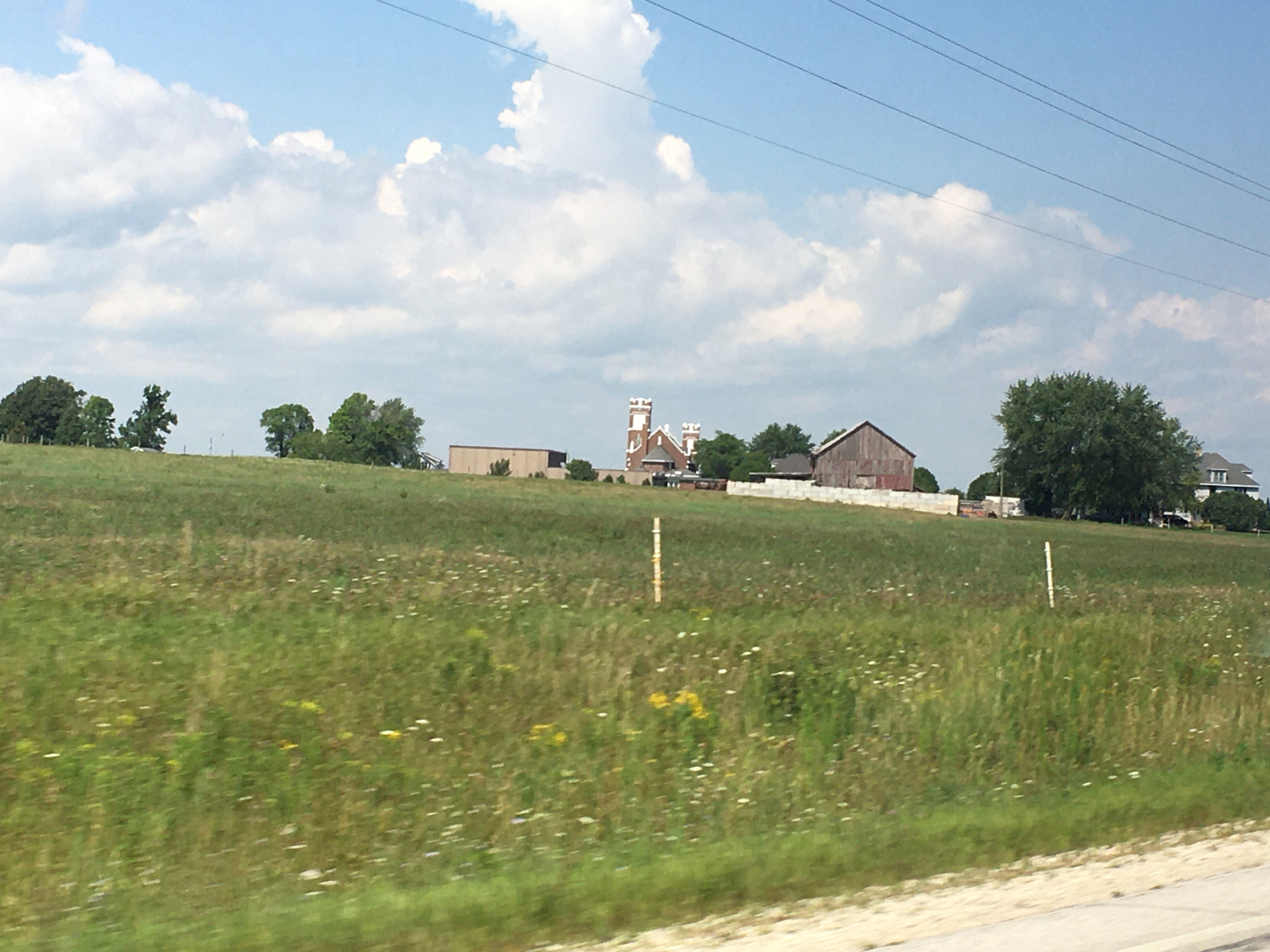
- Newtonburg skyline west of WIS 42

- Location within Wisconsin Location within the United States
- Coordinates: 44°03′06″N 87°45′42″W
- Country: United States
- State: Wisconsin
- County: Manitowoc
- Elevation: 810 ft (250 m)
- Time zone: UTC-6 (Central (CST))
  - Summer (DST): UTC-5 (CDT)
- Area code: 920
- GNIS feature ID: 1577749

Newtonburg is an unincorporated community located in the town of Newton, Manitowoc County, Wisconsin, United States. It is a community to the west of the intersection of WIS 42 and English Lake Road. St. John's Lutheran Church, founded in 1851 and built in 1922, is the focal point of the community.
