= Eland, Wisconsin =

- Village
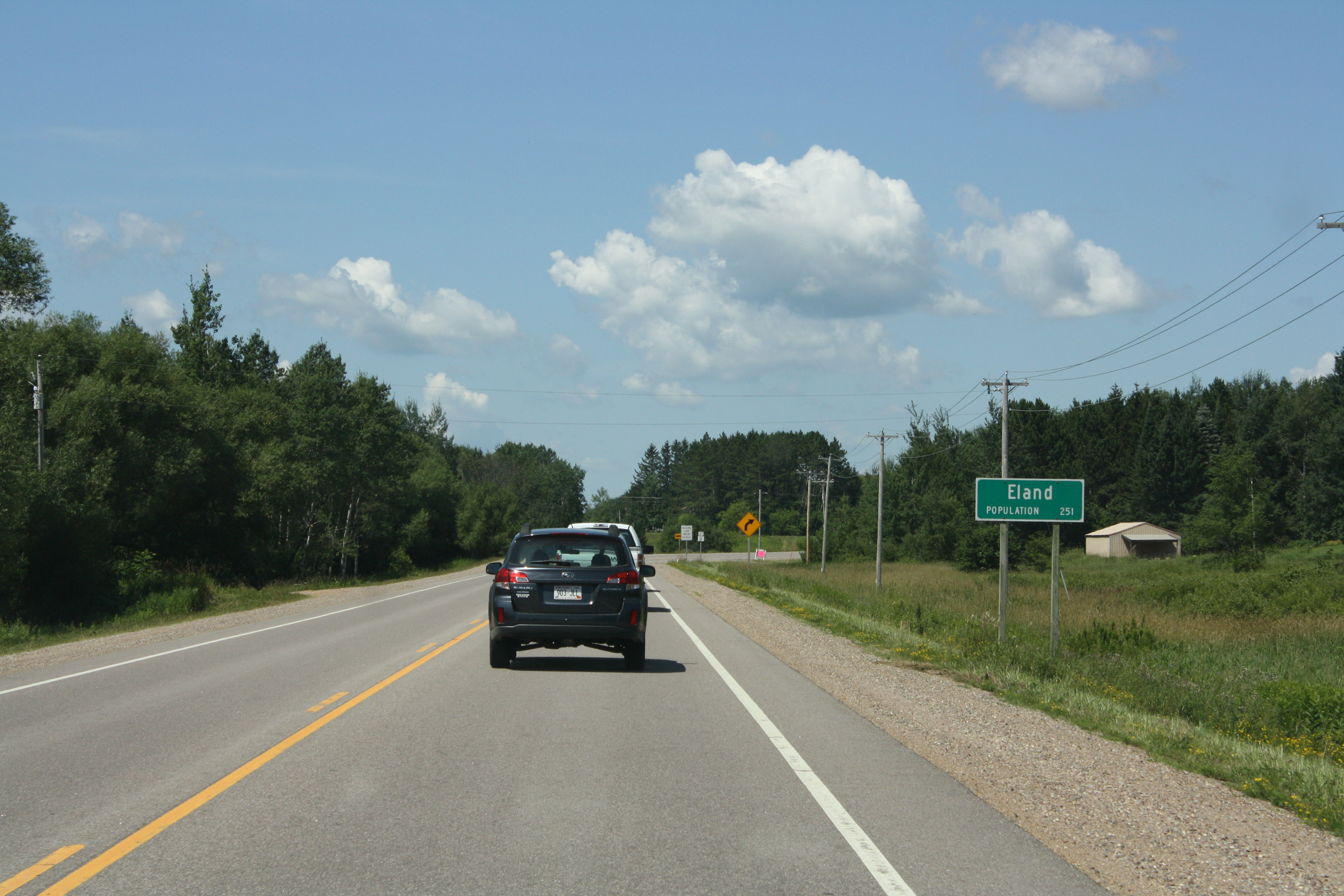
- Looking west at the Eland sign

- Location of Eland in Shawano County, Wisconsin.
- Coordinates: 44°52′13″N 89°12′53″W
- Country: United States
- State: Wisconsin
- County: Shawano

Area
  - Total: 2.20 sq mi (5.71 km^{2})
  - Land: 2.20 sq mi (5.71 km^{2})
  - Water: 0 sq mi (0.00 km^{2})
- Elevation: 1,234 ft (376 m)

Population (2020)
  - Total: 199
  - Density: 90.3/sq mi (34.9/km^{2})
- Time zone: UTC-6 (Central (CST))
  - Summer (DST): UTC-5 (CDT)
- FIPS code: 55-22975
- GNIS feature ID: 1564486
- Website: https://villageofeland.wi.gov/

Eland (formerly Eland Junction) is a village in Shawano County, Wisconsin, United States. The population was 199 at the 2020 census.

== History ==
Eland was originally called Eland Junction, and under the latter name was platted by the railroad in 1888. It was named after the eland, a type of African antelope.

== Geography ==
Eland is located at 44°52′13″N 89°12′53″W (44.870191, -89.214786).

According to the United States Census Bureau, the village has a total area of 2.22 square miles (5.75 km^{2}), all land.

== Demographics ==
Historical population
Census	Pop.	Note	%±
1910	368		—
1920	344		−6.5%
1930	319		−7.3%
1940	296		−7.2%
1950	232		−21.6%
1960	213		−8.2%
1970	229		7.5%
1980	230		0.4%
1990	247		7.4%
2000	251		1.6%
2010	202		−19.5%
2020	199		−1.5%
U.S. Decennial Census

=== 2010 census ===
As of the census of 2010, there were 202 people, 86 households, and 58 families living in the village. The population density was 91.0 inhabitants per square mile (35.1/km^{2}). There were 93 housing units at an average density of 41.9 per square mile (16.2/km^{2}). The racial makeup of the village was 92.1% White, 4.5% Native American, 2.5% from other races, and 1.0% from two or more races. Hispanic or Latino of any race were 2.5% of the population.

There were 86 households, of which 20.9% had children under the age of 18 living with them, 54.7% were married couples living together, 5.8% had a female householder with no husband present, 7.0% had a male householder with no wife present, and 32.6% were non-families. 25.6% of all households were made up of individuals, and 11.7% had someone living alone who was 65 years of age or older. The average household size was 2.35 and the average family size was 2.79.

The median age in the village was 46.8 years. 16.8% of residents were under the age of 18; 12% were between the ages of 18 and 24; 17.9% were from 25 to 44; 33.7% were from 45 to 64; and 19.8% were 65 years of age or older. The gender makeup of the village was 51.5% male and 48.5% female.

=== 2000 census ===
As of the census of 2000, there were 251 people, 93 households, and 66 families living in the village. The population density was 113.0 people per square mile (43.7/km^{2}). There were 96 housing units at an average density of 43.2 per square mile (16.7/km^{2}). The racial makeup of the village was 92.03% White, 5.18% Native American, 1.20% from other races, and 1.59% from two or more races. Hispanic or Latino of any race were 1.20% of the population.

There were 93 households, out of which 37.6% had children under the age of 18 living with them, 53.8% were married couples living together, 9.7% had a female householder with no husband present, and 28.0% were non-families. 23.7% of all households were made up of individuals, and 9.7% had someone living alone who was 65 years of age or older. The average household size was 2.70 and the average family size was 3.18.

In the village, the population was spread out, with 33.1% under the age of 18, 3.6% from 18 to 24, 31.9% from 25 to 44, 18.7% from 45 to 64, and 12.7% who were 65 years of age or older. The median age was 36 years. For every 100 females, there were 105.7 males. For every 100 females age 18 and over, there were 104.9 males.

The median income for a household in the village was $37,917, and the median income for a family was $41,607. Males had a median income of $26,750 versus $23,125 for females. The per capita income for the village was $15,909. About 10.4% of families and 7.9% of the population were below the poverty line, including 2.1% of those under the age of eighteen and 16.7% of those 65 or over.

== Notable people ==
- Roger Breske, business owner and politician
- Thomas J. Mahon, jurist and politician
