= Otto Oscar Wiegand =

American politician (born 1860)

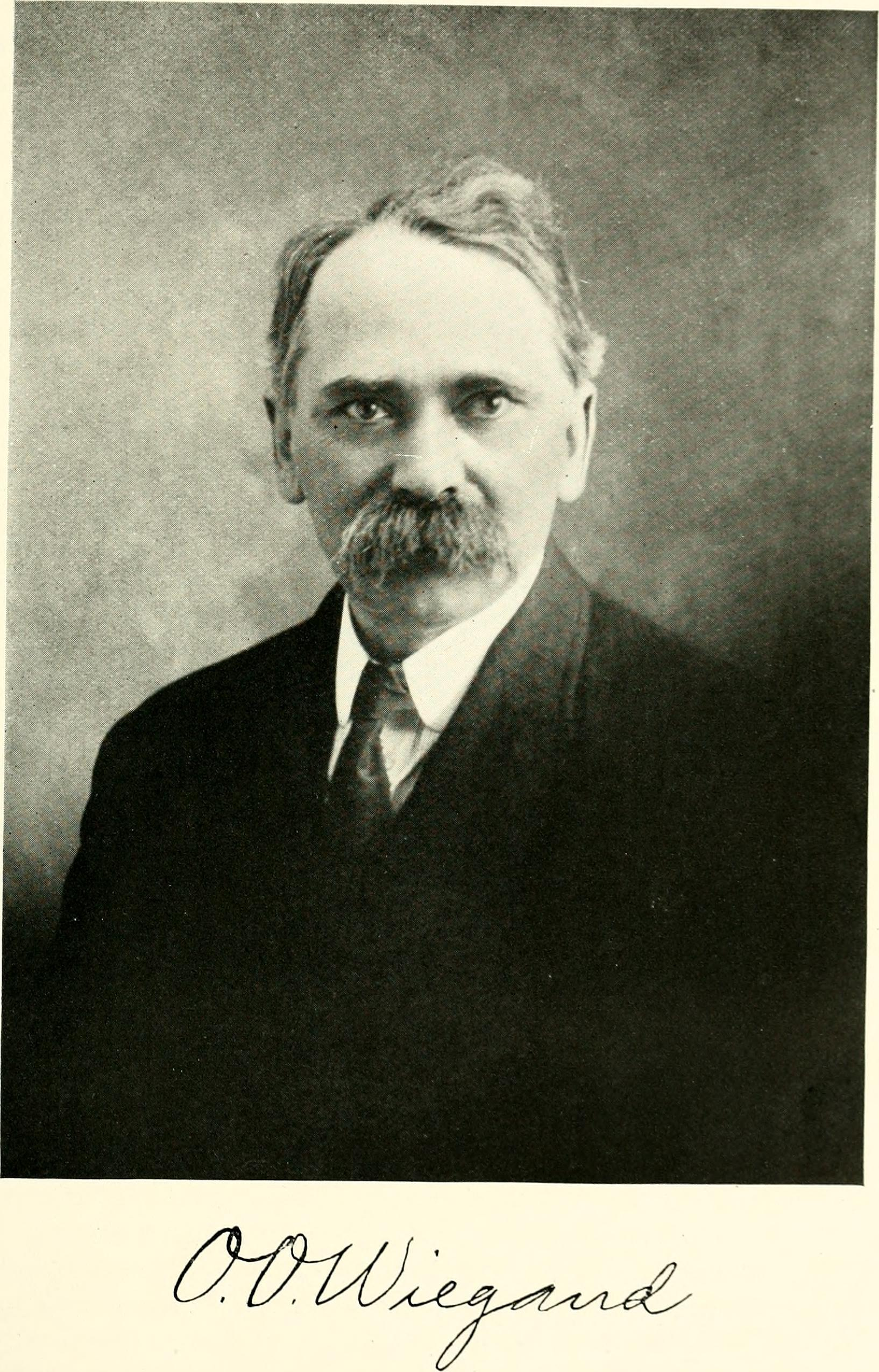
Otto O. Wiegand

Otto Oscar Wiegand (July 9, 1860 – ?) was an American politician. He was a member of the Wisconsin State Assembly. He was born in Hka, Wisconsin. In 1888, he settled in Shawano, Wisconsin.

== Career ==
Wiegand was elected to the Assembly in 1890. Previously, he had been town clerk of Washington, Shawano County, Wisconsin from 1885 to 1888 and a justice of the peace from 1886 to 1888. Also in 1888, Wiegand was an unsuccessful candidate for county clerk of Shawano County, Wisconsin. He was a Democrat.
