= WOMT =

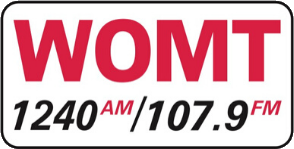
- Manitowoc, Wisconsin; United States
- Broadcast area: Manitowoc–Two Rivers, Wisconsin
- Frequency: 1240 kHz
- Branding: AM 1240 FM 98.9 WOMT

Programming
- Format: Adult contemporary; full service
- Affiliations: Townhall (national news); Westwood One Adult Contemporary; Milwaukee Brewers Radio Network; Milwaukee Bucks Radio Network; Packers Radio Network; NFL on Westwood One Sports

Ownership
- Owner: Seehafer Broadcasting Corp
- Sister stations: WCUB, WLKN, WLTU, WQTC

History
- First air date: WOMT: November 8, 1926; WOMT-FM (as WEMP): December 7, 2014; 11 years ago
- Call sign meaning: "World's Only Mikadow Theater" (station began on second floor of that facility, itself named for station founder and theater's owner, Francis M. Kadow)

Technical information
- Licensing authority: FCC
- Facility ID: 59610
- Class: C
- Power: 992 watts unlimited
- Transmitter coordinates: 44°7′31.00″N 87°37′41.00″W

Links
- Public license information: Public file; LMS
- Webcast: Listen live
- Website: www.womtradio.com

WOMT (1240 AM) is a radio station in Manitowoc, Wisconsin owned by locally based Seehafer Broadcasting. The station airs a mix of news, sports and adult contemporary music under a full service format featuring local staff. Evening and weekend hours are provided by Westwood One's "Adult Contemporary" network. The station serves the twin cities of Manitowoc and Two Rivers, along with Sheboygan, Algoma and Kewaunee.

== Programming ==
WOMT airs news from Townhall and bottom of the hour sports updates from NBC Sports Radio, along with the locally based Money Talks financial program and several other local programs such as Be My Guest and the Air Exchange, and the Monday night Sports Talk program with Brewers Radio Network engineer Kent Sommerfeld as a regular guest. The station is the Lakeshore area's home of Brewers, Bucks, Marquette Golden Eagles, Wisconsin Badgers and Packers play-by-play, and also airs the NFL on Westwood One Sports. The station also shares coverage of Manitowoc Lincoln, Two Rivers, and Manitowoc Roncalli High School sports with its other sister stations, along with other schools throughout Manitowoc, Brown and Sheboygan counties.

The station was a longterm affiliate of the CBS Radio Network, carrying its newscasts and features for decades until the service was wound down in May 2026.

== History ==
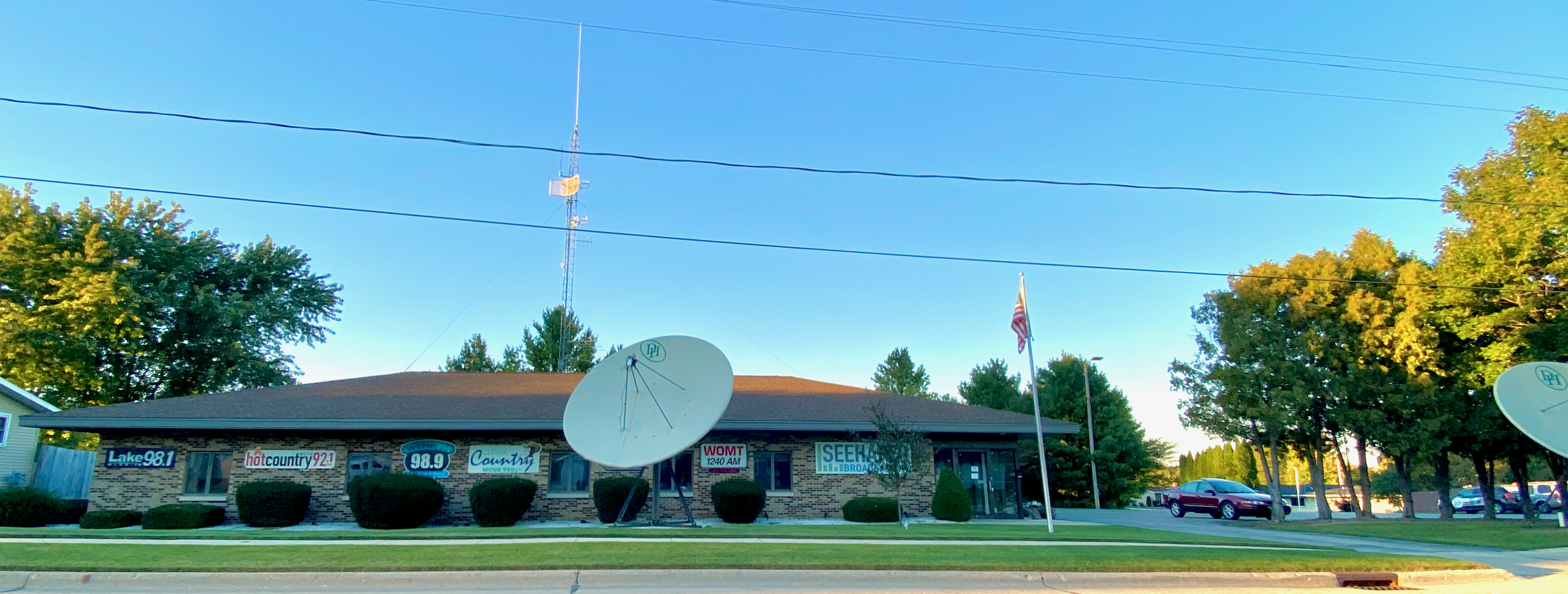
WOMT's studios in Manitowoc, shared with its four sister stations.

WOMT was first licensed on November 8, 1926, to the Mikadow Theater (Francis M. Kadow).

Following the establishment of the Federal Radio Commission (FRC), stations were initially issued a series of temporary authorizations starting on May 3, 1927. In addition, they were notified that if they wanted to continue operating, they needed to file a formal license application by January 15, 1928, as the first step in determining whether they met the new "public interest, convenience, or necessity" standard. On May 25, 1928, the FRC issued General Order 32, which notified 164 stations, including WOMT, that "From an examination of your application for future license it does not find that public interest, convenience, or necessity would be served by granting it." However, the station successfully convinced the commission that it should remain licensed.

On November 11, 1928, the FRC implemented a major reallocation of station transmitting frequencies, as part of a reorganization resulting from its General Order 40. WOMT was assigned to 1210 kHz.

In early 2018, Seehafer Broadcasting filed for an FM translator station involving WOMT with the FCC as part of the agency's January 2018 AM revitalization translator window; the application was duplicative of one filed for WCUB, which it then decided to continue pursuing while seeking an alternate application for WOMT. Seehafer then filed a second translator application for WOMT, which was successful and launched in May 2020, at the same time as WCUB's 97.1 translator

On January 23, 2026, Seehafer Broadcasting announced WOMT would begin simulcasting on sister station WEMP on February 1, 2026. WEMP will discontinue programming and change callsigns to WOMT-FM at that time.
