= WCUB =

- Two Rivers, Wisconsin; United States
- Broadcast area: Two Rivers-Manitowoc-Sheboygan; Green Bay metro
- Frequency: 980 kHz
- Branding: 97.1 WCUB

Programming
- Format: Classic country
- Affiliations: Fox News Radio; NASCAR radio networks (MRN, PRN, IMSRN)

Ownership
- Owner: Mark Seehafer; (Seehafer Broadcasting Corp.)
- Sister stations: WEMP, WLKN, WLTU, WOMT, WQTC

History
- First air date: 1951
- Call sign meaning: Cub Radio, in reference to station's ursine mascot

Technical information
- Licensing authority: FCC
- Facility ID: 14702
- Class: B
- Power: 5,000 watts
- Transmitter coordinates: 44°3′50.00″N 87°41′49.00″W
- Repeater: 97.1 W246DY (Two Rivers)

Links
- Public license information: Public file; LMS
- Website: www.cubradio.com

WCUB (980 AM) is a commercial radio station licensed to Two Rivers, Wisconsin, United States. The station is owned by Mark Seehafer, through licensee Seehafer Broadcasting Corporation, with studios at Mangin Street in Manitowoc. It airs a classic country format.

WCUB's transmitter is sited off Viebahn Street at South 42nd Street, near Interstate 43 in Manitowoc. The signal covers Two Rivers, Manitowoc and Sheboygan along with city-grade coverage of Brown County and Green Bay. Programming is also heard on low-power FM translator W246DY at 97.1 MHz in Two Rivers.

== History ==
The station signed on the air in 1951. It was a 500-watt daytimer.

On November 19, 1965, it added a sister station, WKKB-FM at 92.1 MHz. In the 1960s and 70s, the two stations simulcast a popular Top 40 format. Today, the FM station is a country outlet as WLTU. The stations were purchased by Seehafer Broadcasting in 2018, the owners of its longtime rivals, WOMT (1240) and WQTC-FM (102.3), and merged into Seehafter's facility soon after.

In early May 2020, WCUB started simulcasting on FM translator W246DY at 97.1 MHz, as a part of the FCC's AM revitalization plan.

== Programming ==
WCUB plays country music hits from the 1960s, 1970s, 1980s and 1990s. Most hours begin with an update from Fox News Radio.

WCUB is also the home of NASCAR radio coverage from all three NASCAR radio networks, along with the Indianapolis 500's radio network (including the Brickyard 400), serving that role for not only Manitowoc, Two Rivers and Sheboygan, but also for Green Bay and the Fox Cities.
