= WLTU =

- Manitowoc, Wisconsin; United States
- Frequency: 92.1 MHz
- Branding: Hot Country 92.1

Programming
- Format: Country

Ownership
- Owner: Mark Seehafer; (Seehafer Broadcasting Corp.)
- Sister stations: WCUB, WEMP, WLKN, WOMT, WQTC

History
- First air date: 1966
- Call sign meaning: Station formerly had a soft rock format branded as "Light 92.1"

Technical information
- Licensing authority: FCC
- Facility ID: 14701
- Class: A
- ERP: 3,700 watts
- HAAT: 128 meters
- Transmitter coordinates: 44°7′31.00″N 87°37′41.00″W

Links
- Public license information: Public file; LMS
- Website: hotcountry921.com

WLTU (92.1 FM) is a radio station broadcasting a country music format. Licensed to Manitowoc, Wisconsin, United States, the station is currently owned by Mark Seehafer through licensee Seehafer Broadcasting Corp.
