= John Barth (politician) =

American politician (born 1826)

John Barth (born December 28, 1826) was a German-born American politician. He emigrated to Ozaukee County, Wisconsin in 1853.

A Democrat, Barth represented the First District of Manitowoc County, Wisconsin in the Wisconsin State Assembly. He was Treasurer, Supervisor, Assessor, Chairman of Town Supervisors and Chairman of Schleswig, Wisconsin. In 1868, he lost a bid for Supervisor of Manitowoc County.
