= Thomas J. Mahon =

American politician

Member of the Wisconsin State Assembly
- In office 1911–1913

Personal details
- Born: 1884 Meeme, Manitowoc County, Wisconsin, U.S.
- Died: September 24, 1927 (aged 42–43) Milwaukee, Wisconsin, U.S.
- Party: Republican
- Relatives: Ben H. Mahon (brother)
- Education: University of Wisconsin; University of Wisconsin Law School
- Occupation: Politician; lawyer; judge

Thomas J. Mahon (1884 – September 24, 1927) was an American politician and jurist. He was a member of the Wisconsin State Assembly from 1911 to 1913 and judge of the Milwaukee County Civil Court from 1924 to his death in 1927.

== Early life ==
Thomas J. Mahon was born in 1884 in Meeme, Manitowoc County, Wisconsin. Mahon had poliomyelitis during childhood and was reliant on a wheelchair. He attended East Side High School in Milwaukee, Wisconsin. Mahon then received a Bachelor of Arts degree from the University of Wisconsin. His thesis at the University of Wisconsin was about the Torrens land transfer system. He received a law degree from the University of Wisconsin Law School.

== Career ==
In 1908, Mahon moved to Eland, Shawano County, Wisconsin where he practiced law. While practicing law in Eland, Mahon represented Shawano County in the Wisconsin State Assembly from 1911 to 1913 and was a Republican. Later, Mahon moved to Milwaukee, Wisconsin and continued to practiced law.

Mahon served as executive counsel for Governor of Wisconsin Francis McGovern from 1913 to 1914. In 1918, Mahon ran for Milwaukee County district attorney and lost the election. In 1923, he was elected school director. On June 2, 1924, Mahon was appointed to Branch 7 of the Milwaukee County Civil Court, succeeding Otto H. Breidenbach.

== Personal life ==
His brother, Ben H. Mahon, was a member of the Assembly and of the Wisconsin State Senate.

== Death ==
Mahon died as a result of a relapse of a nervous and physical breakdown on September 24, 1927, in Milwaukee, Wisconsin.
