= Schleswig, Wisconsin =

- Town
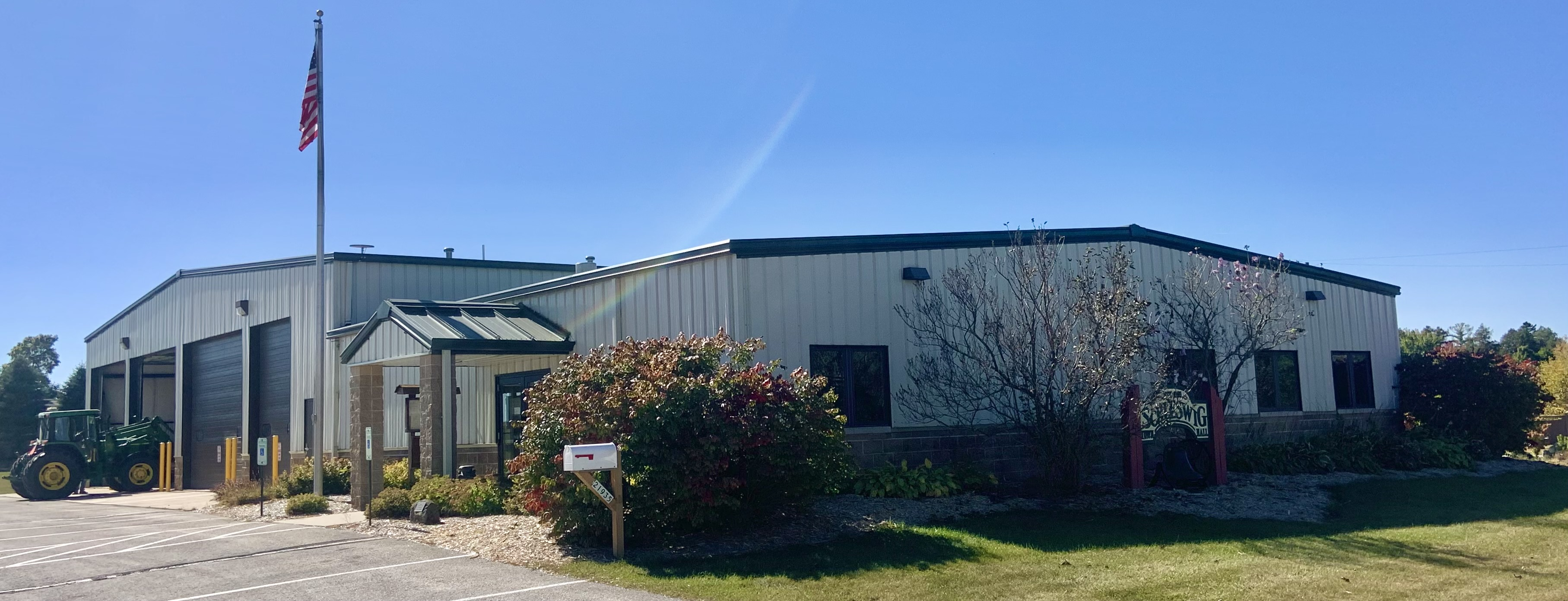
- Town hall

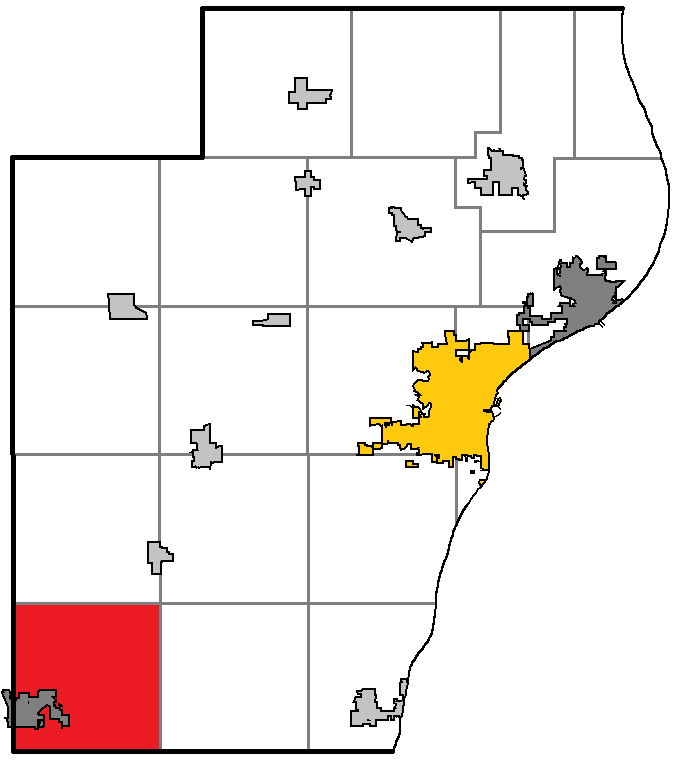
- Location of Schleswig, within Manitowoc County
- Coordinates: 43°55′49″N 87°59′8″W
- Country: United States
- State: Wisconsin
- County: Manitowoc

Area
  - Total: 33.8 sq mi (87.6 km^{2})
  - Land: 33.1 sq mi (85.7 km^{2})
  - Water: 0.77 sq mi (2.0 km^{2})
- Elevation: 866 ft (264 m)

Population (2020)
  - Total: 1,912
  - Density: 57.8/sq mi (22.3/km^{2})
- Time zone: UTC-6 (Central (CST))
  - Summer (DST): UTC-5 (CDT)
- Area code: 920
- FIPS code: 55-72075
- GNIS feature ID: 1584109
- Website: www.townofschleswig.com

Schleswig is a town in Manitowoc County, Wisconsin, United States. The population was 1,912 at the 2020 census.

== Communities ==
- Louis Corners is an unincorporated community located at the intersection of County Road XX (former WIS 149) and Louis Corners Road.
- Millhome is an unincorporated community located near the intersections of WIS 32 and WIS 57 just north of the Manitowoc-Sheboygan county line. The two highways are part of an expressway from the community to Kiel. The community is also located along the Sheboygan River.
- Rockville is an unincorporated community adjacent to Kiel on the city's east side.
- Meggers is an unincorporated community located on the Manitowoc-Calumet county line at the intersection of Charlesburg Road and Meggers Road. The community was named for Andrew Meggers, who had purchased an area store and tavern from one Ferdinand Rice.

== History ==
The town was organized on November 10, 1855, across the line from the town of New Holstein.

== Geography ==
According to the United States Census Bureau, the town has a total area of 33.8 square miles (87.6 km^{2}), of which 33.1 square miles (85.7 km^{2}) is land and 0.8 square miles (2.0 km^{2}) (2.25%) is water.

== Demographics ==
As of the census of 2000, there were 1,900 people, 697 households, and 549 families residing in the town. The population density was 57.4 people per square mile (22.2/km^{2}). There were 871 housing units at an average density of 26.3 per square mile (10.2/km^{2}). The racial makeup of the town was 98.79% White, 0.05% African American, 0.32% Native American, 0.11% Asian, and 0.74% from two or more races. Hispanic or Latino people of any race were 0.42% of the population.

There were 697 households, out of which 35.7% had children under the age of 18 living with them, 72.6% were married couples living together, 2.7% had a female householder with no husband present, and 21.1% were non-families. 16.5% of all households were made up of individuals, and 8.2% had someone living alone who was 65 years of age or older. The average household size was 2.73 and the average family size was 3.09.

In the town, the population was spread out, with 27.5% under the age of 18, 5.3% from 18 to 24, 28.1% from 25 to 44, 27.5% from 45 to 64, and 11.6% who were 65 years of age or older. The median age was 39 years. For every 100 females, there were 99.8 males. For every 100 females age 18 and over, there were 102.1 males.

The median income for a household in the town was $52,841, and the median income for a family was $58,158. Males had a median income of $37,384 versus $26,125 for females. The per capita income for the town was $22,447. About 1.8% of families and 3.2% of the population were below the poverty line, including 2.1% of those under age 18 and 5.7% of those age 65 or over.

== Notable people ==
- John Barth, state legislator, held various offices in the town
- Charles Rudolph Zorn, farmer and state legislator, lived in the town
