= Liberty, Manitowoc County, Wisconsin =

Liberty, Wisconsin
- Town
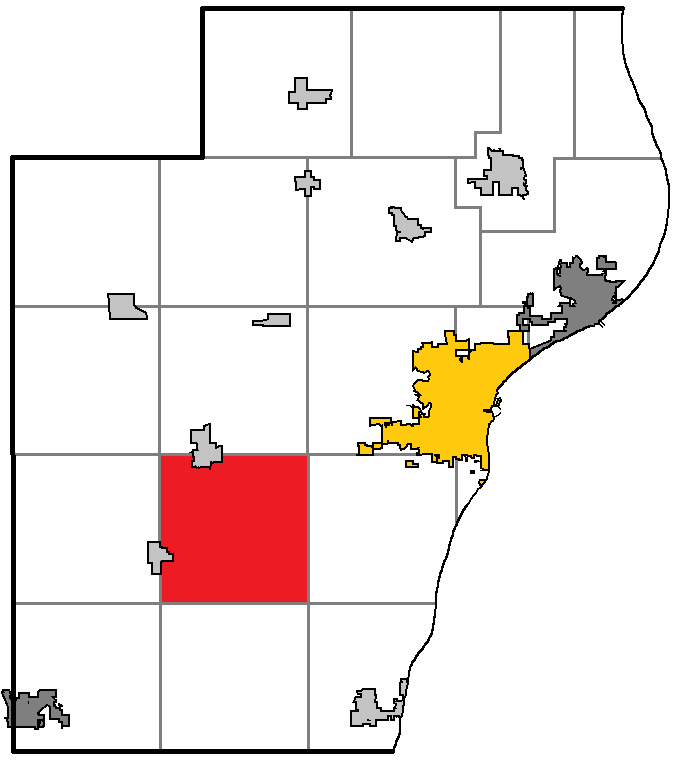
- Location of Liberty, within Manitowoc County
- Coordinates: 44°1′47″N 87°52′10″W
- Country: United States
- State: Wisconsin
- County: Manitowoc

Area
  - Total: 35.4 sq mi (91.7 km^{2})
  - Land: 35.1 sq mi (91.0 km^{2})
  - Water: 0.27 sq mi (0.7 km^{2})
- Elevation: 830 ft (253 m)

Population (2020)
  - Total: 1,245
  - Density: 35.4/sq mi (13.7/km^{2})
- Time zone: UTC-6 (Central (CST))
  - Summer (DST): UTC-5 (CDT)
- Area code: 920
- FIPS code: 55-43850
- GNIS feature ID: 1583551
- Website: www.townoflibertywi.com

Liberty is a town in Manitowoc County, Wisconsin, United States. The population was 1,245 at the 2020 census.

== Rube ==
Rube is an unincorporated community at the intersection of English Lake Road and Range Line Road. The community is split between the towns of Liberty and Newton.

== Geography ==
According to the United States Census Bureau, the town has a total area of 35.4 square miles (91.7 km^{2}), of which 35.1 square miles (91.0 km^{2}) is land and 0.3 square miles (0.7 km^{2})(0.76%) is water.

== Demographics ==
As of the census of 2000, there were 1,287 people, 456 households, and 378 families residing in the town. The population density was 36.6 people per square mile (14.1/km^{2}). There were 498 housing units at an average density of 14.2 per square mile (5.5/km^{2}). The racial makeup of the town was 98.21% White, 0.08% Native American, 1.09% from other races, and 0.62% from two or more races. Hispanic or Latino people of any race were 1.32% of the population.

There were 456 households, out of which 36.2% had children under the age of 18 living with them, 77.0% were married couples living together, 3.5% had a female householder with no husband present, and 16.9% were non-families. 13.6% of all households were made up of individuals, and 7.5% had someone living alone who was 65 years of age or older. The average household size was 2.82 and the average family size was 3.11.

In the town, the population was spread out, with 27.7% under the age of 18, 6.1% from 18 to 24, 26.7% from 25 to 44, 27.4% from 45 to 64, and 12.1% who were 65 years of age or older. The median age was 39 years. For every 100 females, there were 105.9 males. For every 100 females age 18 and over, there were 108.7 males.

The median income for a household in the town was $56,169, and the median income for a family was $57,958. Males had a median income of $37,656 versus $23,938 for females. The per capita income for the town was $21,498. About 0.5% of families and 1.8% of the population were below the poverty line, including 1.4% of those under age 18 and 2.7% of those age 65 or over.

== Notable people ==
- Thomas J. Mahon, Wisconsin State Representative and jurist; born in the town
- Svend Samuelson, Wisconsin State Representative and farmer; lived in the town; served as the town clerk
- Daniel Tracy, Wisconsin State Representative, farmer, and business; lived in the town; served on the Liberty Town Board and as the chairman of the town board
