= Daniel Tracy (politician) =

American farmer and politician from Wisconsin (1843–1919)

Member of the Wisconsin State Assembly
- In office 1887–1888

Personal details
- Born: December 8, 1843 King's County, Ireland
- Died: October 2, 1919 (aged 75) Manitowoc, Wisconsin, U.S.
- Party: Democratic
- Profession: Politician, farmer, businessman

Daniel Tracy (December 8, 1843 – October 2, 1919) was an American farmer, businessman, and politician.

Tracy was born in King's County, Ireland. He emigrated to the United States and settled in the town of Liberty, Manitowoc County, Wisconsin in 1854. Tracy went to the public schools in Manitowoc County. Tracy was a farmer and owned a hotel. He lived in Osman, Wisconsin. Tracy served on the Liberty Town Board and was chairman of the town board. Tracy also served on the school board and the Manitowoc County Board of Supervisors. Tracy served in the Wisconsin Assembly in 1887 and 1888 and was a Democrat. Tracy died in Manitowoc, Wisconsin.
