= Charles Rudolph Zorn =

American politician

Charles (Carl) Rudolph Zorn (August 4, 1844 – September 25, 1916) was an American farmer and politician.

Born in what is now Germany, he settled in Schleswig, Wisconsin with his family in 1854. Zorn was a farmer. He served on the Schleswig Town Board and the Manitowoc County, Wisconsin Board of Supervisors. Zorn served in the Wisconsin State Assembly for Manitowoc County in 1873 and 1874, was not a candidate for re-election in the latter year (being succeeded by Fred Schmitz), and after the Assembly was redistricted returned to a somewhat different district in 1876. He died in Louis Corners, Wisconsin.
