= Program test authority =

In broadcasting, program test authority (PTA) is an authorization to conduct on-air testing of broadcast station facilities authorized to be built under a construction permit. Once this testing is successfully completed, and all measured parameters match what was authorized in the permit, the permittee can apply to the broadcasting authority for a broadcast license to cover the permit. PTA lasts until the license is issued (or, rarely, denied).

"Program" refers to the permission to broadcast regular radio programming or TV programming, instead of just a test transmission such as a test card or bars and tone (TV only), broadcast callsign or other required station identification, or dead air (which may not be permissible). Otherwise, only brief tests are allowed without PTA, in order to verify proper installation and functioning of all transmission equipment, such as the transmitter components (exciter and amplifier), feedline, antenna, and any diplexers that may be used.

In the United States, the Federal Communications Commission (FCC) gives most stations automatic program test authority if they are using an omnidirectional antenna. For stations with a directional antenna, PTA is only for half of regular power, and is not granted until the permittee's broadcast engineer certifies that the antenna is installed properly so that the station's radiation pattern is correct. Stations must apply for a license within 30 days of starting broadcasts under program test authority. Upon issuance of the license, directional stations then commence full-power operation.
