= New Holstein (town), Wisconsin =

Town in Calumet County, Wisconsin

New Holstein, Wisconsin
- Town
- Town of New Holstein
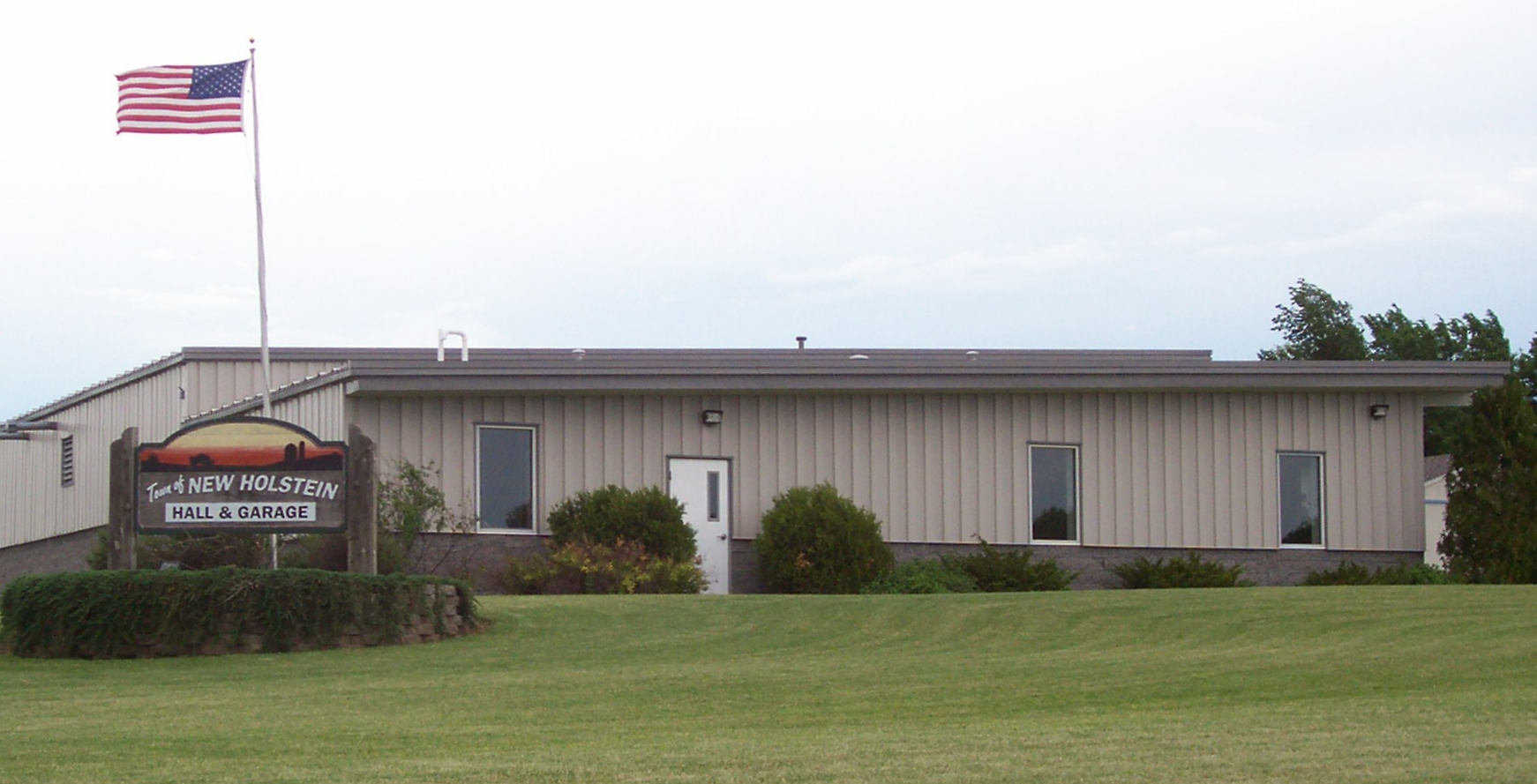
- Town hall just off of Wisconsin Highway 57, north of the city of New Holstein

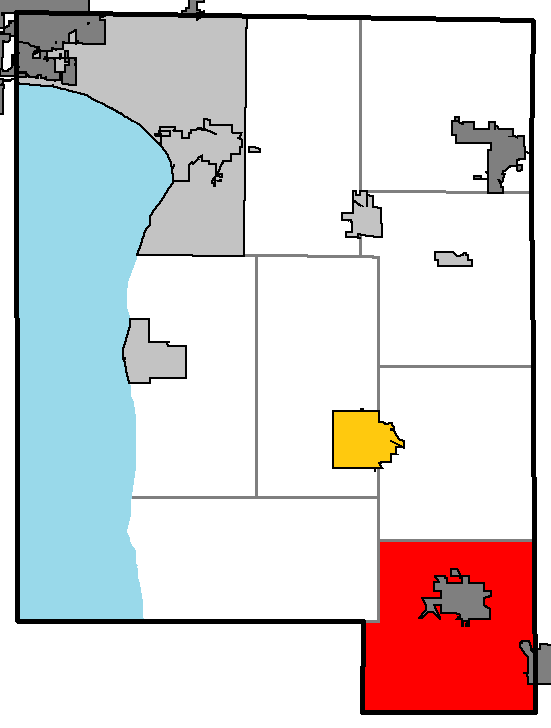
- Location of New Holstein, within Calumet County
- Coordinates: 43°55′41″N 88°05′33″W
- Country: United States
- State: Wisconsin
- County: Calumet

Area
  - Total: 31.65 sq mi (82.0 km^{2})
  - Land: 31.51 sq mi (81.6 km^{2})
  - Water: 0.14 sq mi (0.36 km^{2})

Population (2020)
  - Total: 1,534
  - Density: 48.68/sq mi (18.80/km^{2})
- Time zone: UTC-6 (Central (CST))
  - Summer (DST): UTC-5 (CDT)
- Area code(s): 920 & 274
- GNIS feature ID: 1583810

New Holstein is a town in Calumet County in the U.S. state of Wisconsin. The population was 1,534 at the 2020 census, up from 1,508 at the 2010 census. The City of New Holstein is located in the town, but the two are politically independent. The unincorporated communities of Meggers and St. Anna are located partially in the town.

== History ==
The town was officially formed on March 2, 1849, under Chapter 59 of the Wisconsin statutes. A meeting was held on June 25, 1849, at Claus Oesau's house, where the first town council was elected, with chairman Charles Gruening, town supervisors Henry Volquarts and Claus Oesau, town clerk E. Veers, town assessor Wm. B. Griem, and town fenceviewers Claus Tams, Hy. Pieper, Ch. Bock, and T. Trembur.

== Geography ==
The Town of New Holstein occupies the southeast corner of Calumet County. It is bordered by Manitowoc County to the east, Sheboygan County to the south, and partially by Fond du Lac County to the west. The city of New Holstein is located in the center of the town, and the city of Kiel abuts part of the town's eastern border. According to the United States Census Bureau, the town has a total area of 31.7 square miles (82.2 km^{2}), of which 31.6 square miles (81.8 km^{2}) is land and 0.2 square miles (0.4 km^{2}), or 0.44%, is water.

== Demographics ==
As of the census of 2000, there were 1,457 people, 539 households, and 438 families residing in the town. The population density was 45.6 people per square mile (17.6/km^{2}). There were 558 housing units at an average density of 17.5 per square mile (6.7/km^{2}). The racial makeup of the town was 99.25% White, 0.07% Black or African American, 0.21% Native American, 0.21% Asian, 0.07% from other races, and 0.21% from two or more races. 0.41% of the population were Hispanic or Latino of any race.

There were 539 households, out of which 34.1% had children under the age of 18 living with them, 72.7% were married couples living together, 5.0% had a female householder with no husband present, and 18.6% were non-families. 15.0% of all households were made up of individuals, and 5.2% had someone living alone who was 65 years of age or older. The average household size was 2.70 and the average family size was 3.00.

In the town, the population was spread out, with 25.1% under the age of 18, 7.6% from 18 to 24, 27.5% from 25 to 44, 28.1% from 45 to 64, and 11.7% who were 65 years of age or older. The median age was 39 years. For every 100 females, there were 101.0 males. For every 100 females age 18 and over, there were 104.3 males.

The median income for a household in the town was $58,050, and the median income for a family was $61,250. Males had a median income of $37,689 versus $25,938 for females. The per capita income for the town was $21,371. About 4.3% of families and 6.4% of the population were below the poverty line, including 9.2% of those under age 18 and 3.8% of those age 65 or over.
