= Newton, Manitowoc County, Wisconsin =

Newton, Wisconsin
- Town
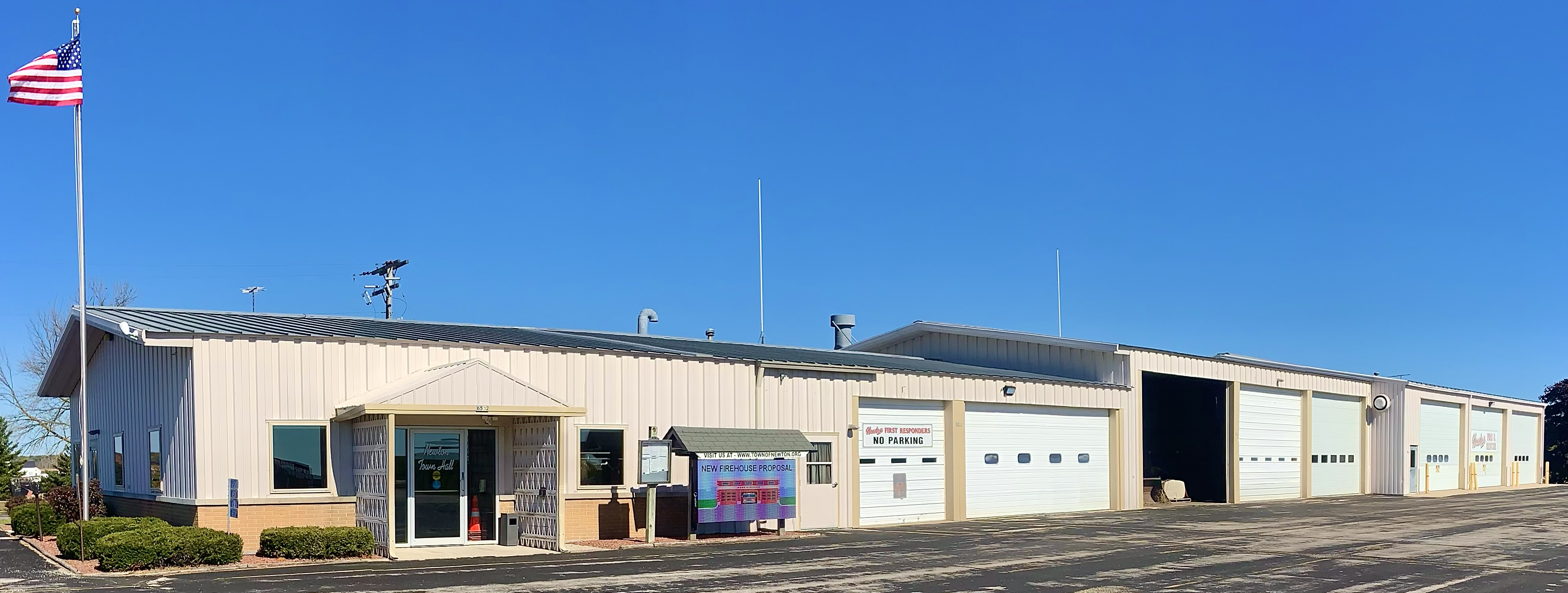
- Town hall

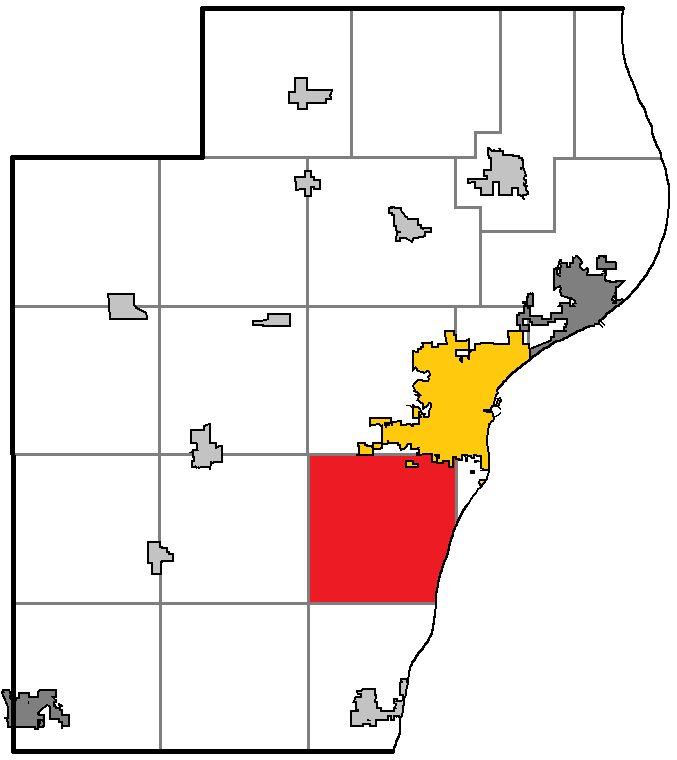
- Location of Newton, within Manitowoc County
- Coordinates: 44°1′49″N 87°44′3″W
- Country: United States
- State: Wisconsin
- County: Manitowoc

Area
  - Total: 35.5 sq mi (91.9 km^{2})
  - Land: 34.1 sq mi (88.2 km^{2})
  - Water: 1.4 sq mi (3.6 km^{2})
- Elevation: 745 ft (227 m)

Population (2020)
  - Total: 2,122
  - Density: 62.3/sq mi (24.1/km^{2})
- Time zone: UTC-6 (Central (CST))
  - Summer (DST): UTC-5 (CDT)
- Area code: 920
- FIPS code: 55-57200
- GNIS feature ID: 1583817
- Website: www.townofnewton.org

Newton is a town in Manitowoc County, Wisconsin, United States. The population was 2,122 at the 2020 census.

== Communities ==
- Clover is an unincorporated community at the intersection of Highway CR and Clover Road.
- Duveneck is a former community located north of where both I-43 and Highway CR interchanges/intersects with Highway C. Nothing stands within the immediate vicinity of the site.
- Newton is an unincorporated community broken up by I-43, and intersected with Highways U and CR east of I-43’s Newton Road bridge. Previous names included Timothy and Newton Station. The current name of Newton is derived from John Newton, an officer from the American Revolutionary War.
- Newtonburg is an unincorporated community located at the intersection of English Lake Road and Newtonburg Road. WIS 42 passes to the east of the community and formerly served the community by 1956. St. John's Lutheran Church, founded 1851 and built in 1922, is the focal point of the community.
- Northeim is an unincorporated community located around the intersections of Highways U and LS.
- Rube is an unincorporated community located in both the towns of Newton and neighboring Liberty, specifically at the intersection of English Lake and Range Line Roads.

== Geography ==
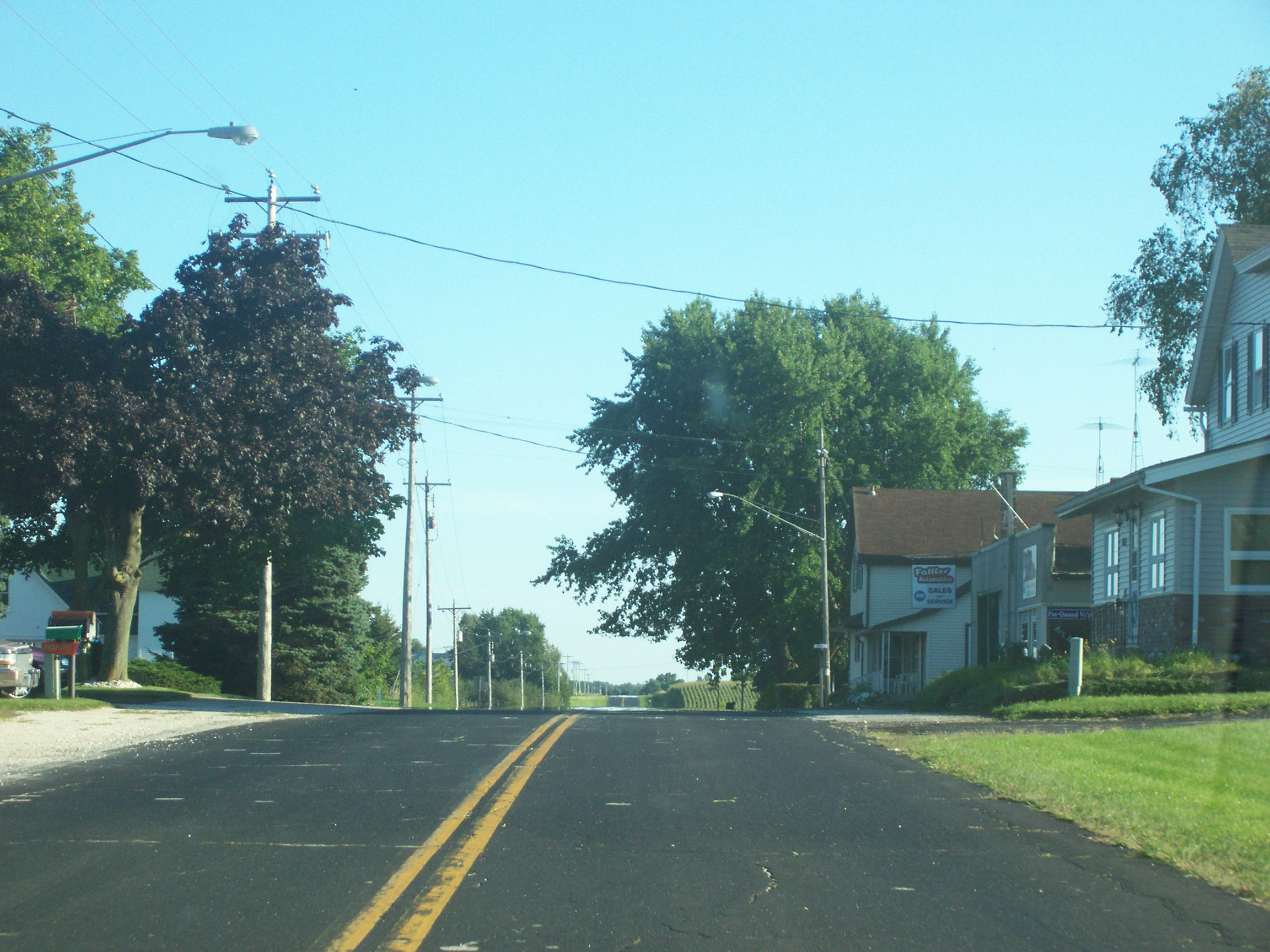

According to the United States Census Bureau, the town has a total area of 35.5 square miles (91.9 km^{2}), of which 34.1 square miles (88.2 km^{2}) is land and 1.4 square miles (3.7 km^{2}) (3.97%) is water.

== Demographics ==
As of the census of 2000, there were 2,241 people, 795 households, and 631 families residing in the town. The population density was 65.8 people per square mile (25.4/km^{2}). There were 850 housing units at an average density of 24.9 per square mile (9.6/km^{2}). The racial makeup of the town was 98.71% White, 0.31% Native American, 0.27% Asian, 0.22% from other races, and 0.49% from two or more races. Hispanic or Latino people of any race were 0.54% of the population.

There were 795 households, out of which 34.3% had children under the age of 18 living with them, 71.9% were married couples living together, 4.5% had a female householder with no husband present, and 20.6% were non-families. 17.5% of all households were made up of individuals, and 6.0% had someone living alone who was 65 years of age or older. The average household size was 2.78 and the average family size was 3.15.

In the town, the population was spread out, with 25.6% under the age of 18, 7.0% from 18 to 24, 27.8% from 25 to 44, 27.6% from 45 to 64, and 12.0% who were 65 years of age or older. The median age was 39 years. For every 100 females, there were 105.6 males. For every 100 females age 18 and over, there were 106.8 males.

The median income for a household in the town was $54,359, and the median income for a family was $61,174. Males had a median income of $36,620 versus $24,583 for females. The per capita income for the town was $22,467. About 2.3% of families and 4.8% of the population were below the poverty line, including 3.3% of those under age 18 and 4.7% of those age 65 or over.

== Historical landmarks ==
The Lutze Housebarn is one of the few remaining housebarns still in existence in the United States.

In 2021, the Wisconsin Shipwreck Coast National Marine Sanctuary was established in the waters of Lake Michigan off Newton to protect historic shipwrecks.

== Transportation ==
- I-43 enters Newton from the adjacent Town of Centerville towards Milwaukee and Sheboygan, running along the town's center and eastern side before traversing northward towards Manitowoc and Green Bay.
- WIS 42 enters Newton from a brief unsigned segment in the adjacent Town of Liberty towards Howards Grove and Osman, running along the town's western side before traversing northward towards Manitowoc and Sturgeon Bay. The portion of WIS 42 from Sheboygan to Manitowoc is mainly bypassed and is part of Alternate I-43 from Howards Grove to Manitowoc.

== Notable people ==
- Robert Naumann, farmer, businessman, and Wisconsin State Representative, was born in the town
- Simon F. Wehrwein, farmer, educator, and Wisconsin State Representative, was born in the town
