= Cleveland (village), Wisconsin =

Cleveland
- Village
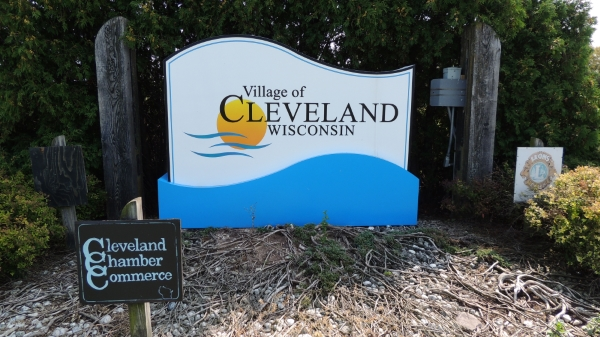

- Location of Cleveland in Manitowoc County, Wisconsin

- Location within the state of Wisconsin
- Coordinates: 43°55′4″N 87°44′47″W
- Country: United States
- State: Wisconsin
- County: Manitowoc

Area
  - Total: 1.98 sq mi (5.13 km^{2})
  - Land: 1.98 sq mi (5.12 km^{2})
  - Water: 0.0039 sq mi (0.01 km^{2})

Population (2020)
  - Total: 1,579
  - Density: 736.1/sq mi (284.22/km^{2})
- Time zone: UTC-6 (Central (CST))
  - Summer (DST): UTC-5 (CDT)
- ZIP code: 53015
- Area code: 920
- FIPS code: 55-15400
- GNIS feature ID: 1582976
- Website: www.clevelandwi.gov

Cleveland is a village in Manitowoc County, Wisconsin, United States. The population was 1,579 at the 2020 census.

== History ==
The village was named after President Grover Cleveland. The village was formed in 1958 out of the unincorporated communities of Centerville, Hika, and St. Wendel.

== Education ==
The main campus for Lakeshore Technical College is located in the village, while public school students are a part of the Sheboygan Area School District. The district maintains Cleveland Elementary School in the village, and those students usually attend Horace Mann Middle School and Sheboygan North High School in the city of Sheboygan later, if they have no school choice preference.

== Geography ==
Cleveland is located at 43°55′4″N 87°44′47″W (43.917829, -87.746250).

According to the United States Census Bureau, the village has a total area of 2.09 square miles (5.41 km^{2}), of which 2.08 square miles (5.39 km^{2}) is land and 0.01 square miles (0.03 km^{2}) is water.

== Demographics ==
Historical population
Census	Pop.	Note	%±
1960	687		—
1970	761		10.8%
1980	1,270		66.9%
1990	1,398		10.1%
2000	1,361		−2.6%
2010	1,485		9.1%
2020	1,579		6.3%
U.S. Decennial Census

=== 2010 census ===
As of the census of 2010, there were 1,485 people, 587 households, and 428 families living in the village. The population density was 713.9 inhabitants per square mile (275.6/km^{2}). There were 643 housing units at an average density of 309.1 per square mile (119.3/km^{2}). The racial makeup of the village was 94.4% White, 0.3% African American, 0.5% Native American, 0.7% Asian, 3.2% from other races, and 0.8% from two or more races. Hispanic or Latino people of any race were 8.7% of the population.

There were 587 households, of which 31.5% had children under the age of 18 living with them, 62.5% were married couples living together, 6.1% had a female householder with no husband present, 4.3% had a male householder with no wife present, and 27.1% were non-families. 23.0% of all households were made up of individuals, and 10.4% had someone living alone who was 65 years of age or older. The average household size was 2.53 and the average family size was 2.97.

The median age in the village was 39.1 years. 25.9% of residents were under the age of 18; 5.7% were between the ages of 18 and 24; 25.8% were from 25 to 44; 29.7% were from 45 to 64; and 12.9% were 65 years of age or older. The gender makeup of the village was 51.3% male and 48.7% female.

=== 2000 census ===
As of the census of 2000, there were 1,361 people, 536 households, and 384 families living in the village. The population density was 669.2 people per square mile (258.9/km^{2}). There were 578 housing units at an average density of 284.2/sq mi (109.9/km^{2}). The racial makeup of the village was 98.02% White, 0.29% African American, 0.15% Native American, 0.15% Asian, 0.66% from other races, and 0.73% from two or more races. Hispanic or Latino people of any race were 1.47% of the population.

There were 536 households, out of which 32.1% had children under the age of 18 living with them, 65.1% were married couples living together, 4.1% had a female householder with no husband present, and 28.2% were non-families. 23.3% of all households were made up of individuals, and 9.5% had someone living alone who was 65 years of age or older. The average household size was 2.54 and the average family size was 3.02.

In the village, the population was spread out, with 25.3% under the age of 18, 7.1% from 18 to 24, 31.8% from 25 to 44, 24.5% from 45 to 64, and 11.3% who were 65 years of age or older. The median age was 37 years. For every 100 females, there were 107.5 males. For every 100 females age 18 and over, there were 105.9 males.

The median income for a household in the village was $50,739, and the median income for a family was $56,607. Males had a median income of $37,917 versus $25,556 for females. The per capita income for the village was $21,761. About 1.8% of families and 1.6% of the population were below the poverty line, including 0.6% of those under age 18 and 1.4% of those age 65 or over.

== Media ==
Being in Manitowoc County, Cleveland is officially part of the Green Bay television market, although being only a mile from the county line, it is possible for residents with a strong enough antenna to receive receive stations over-the-air from Milwaukee as well, most notably WITI due to the TV's station location. The village is also part of the Sheboygan/Manitowoc radio market.

== Notable people ==
- Wilhelm Albers, Wisconsin State Representative; school principal in what was then Hika
- John Lorfeld, Wisconsin State Representative; lived in Cleveland
- Otto Oscar Wiegand, Wisconsin State Representative; born in what was then Hika

== Images ==
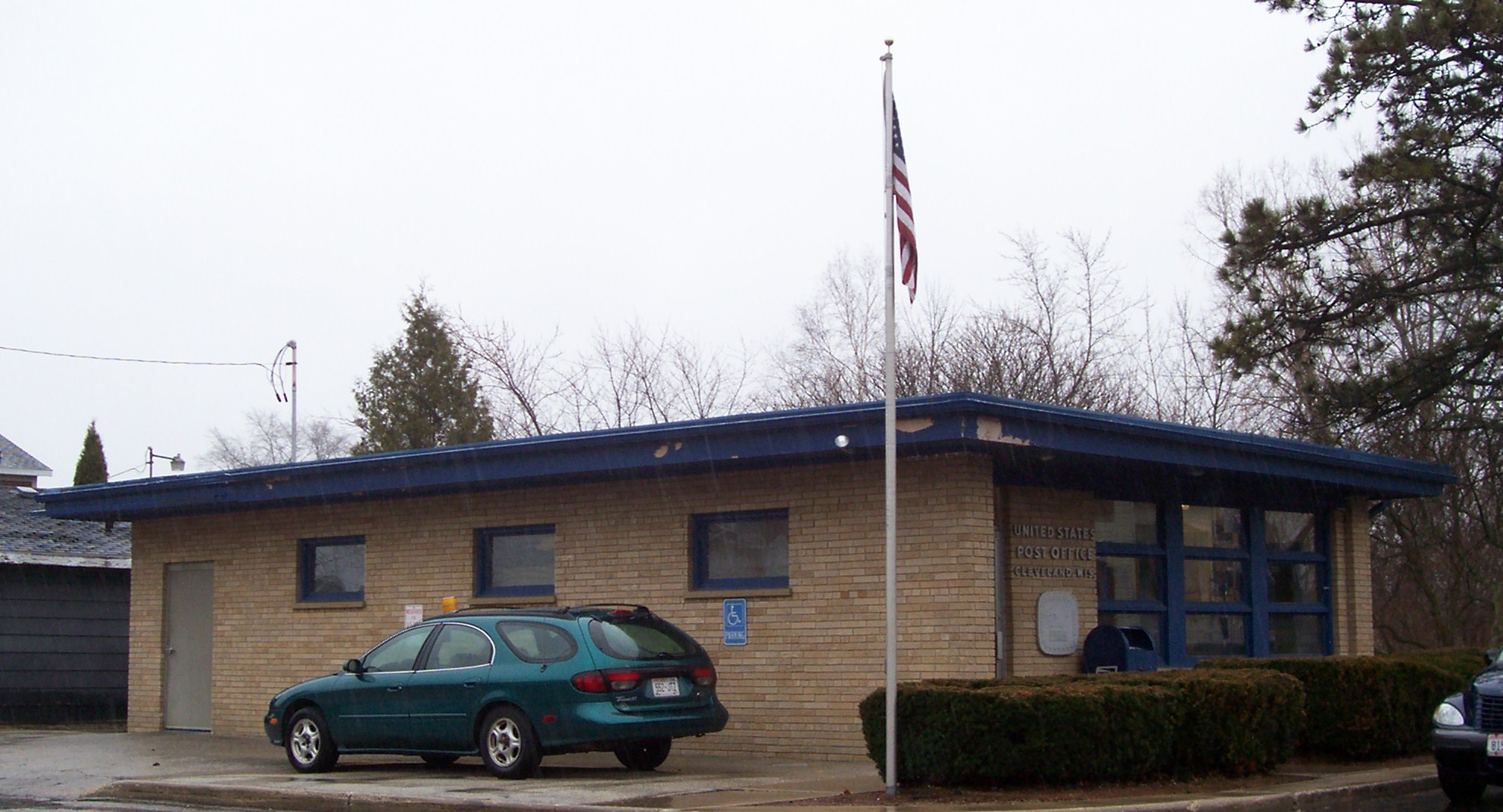
Post office

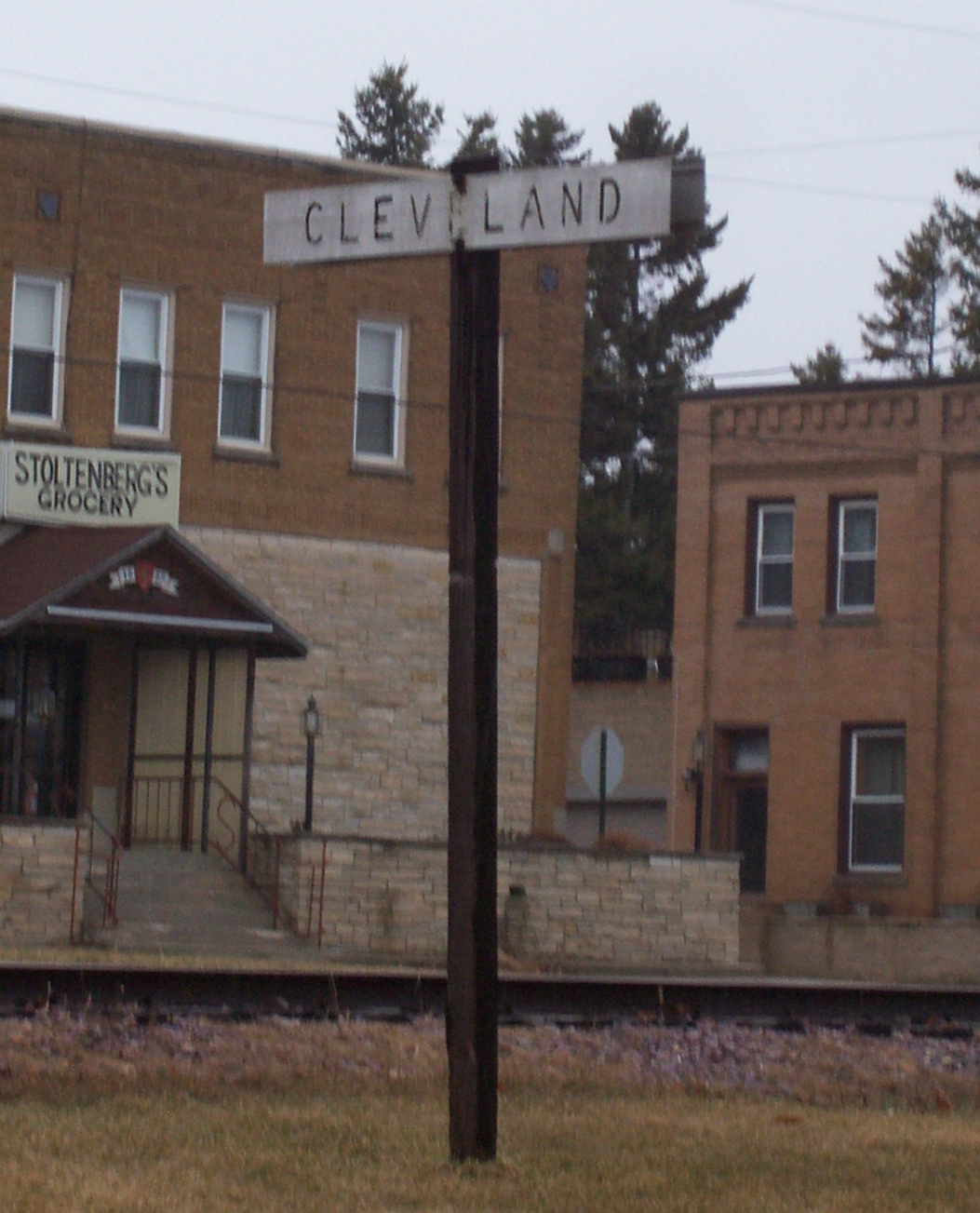
Railroad sign

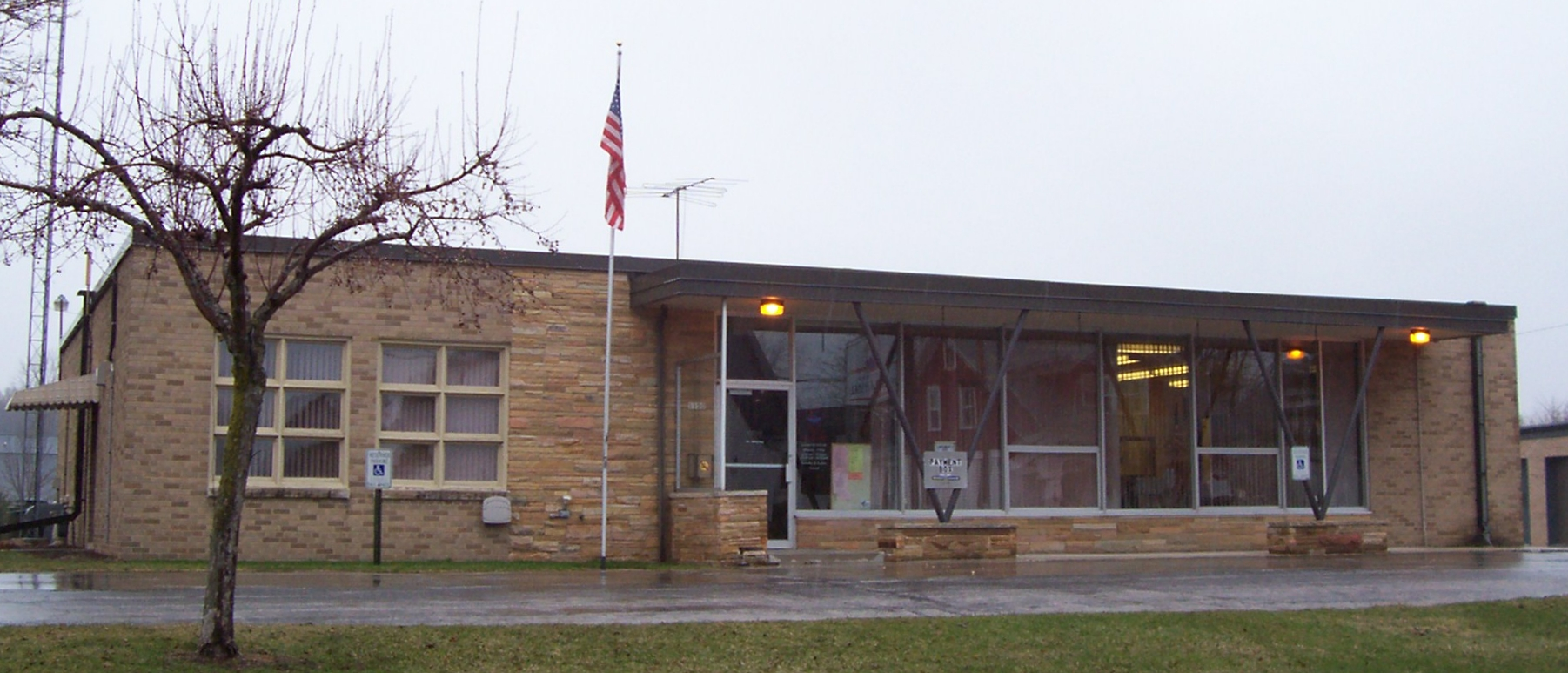
Village Hall

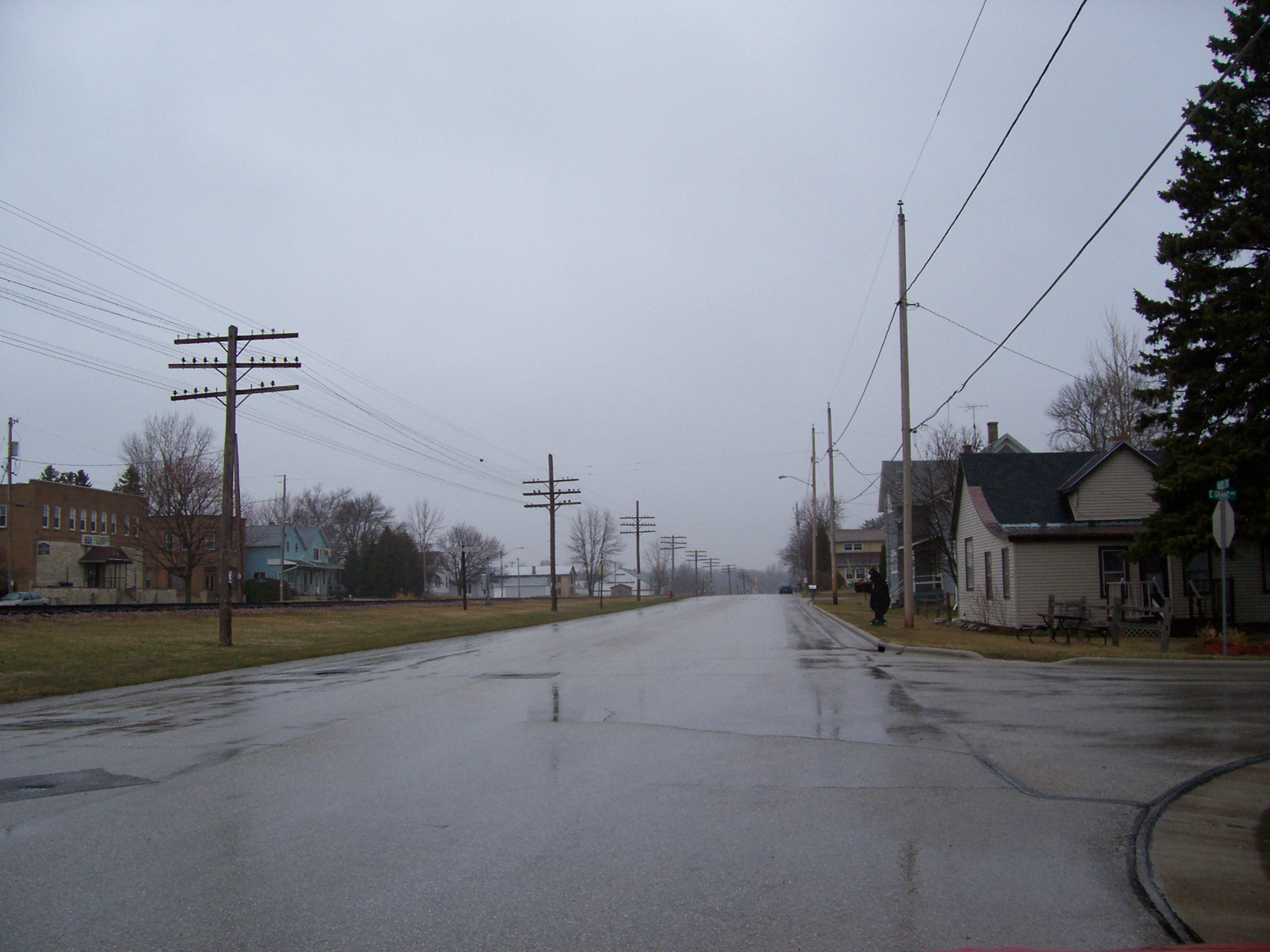
Railroad area

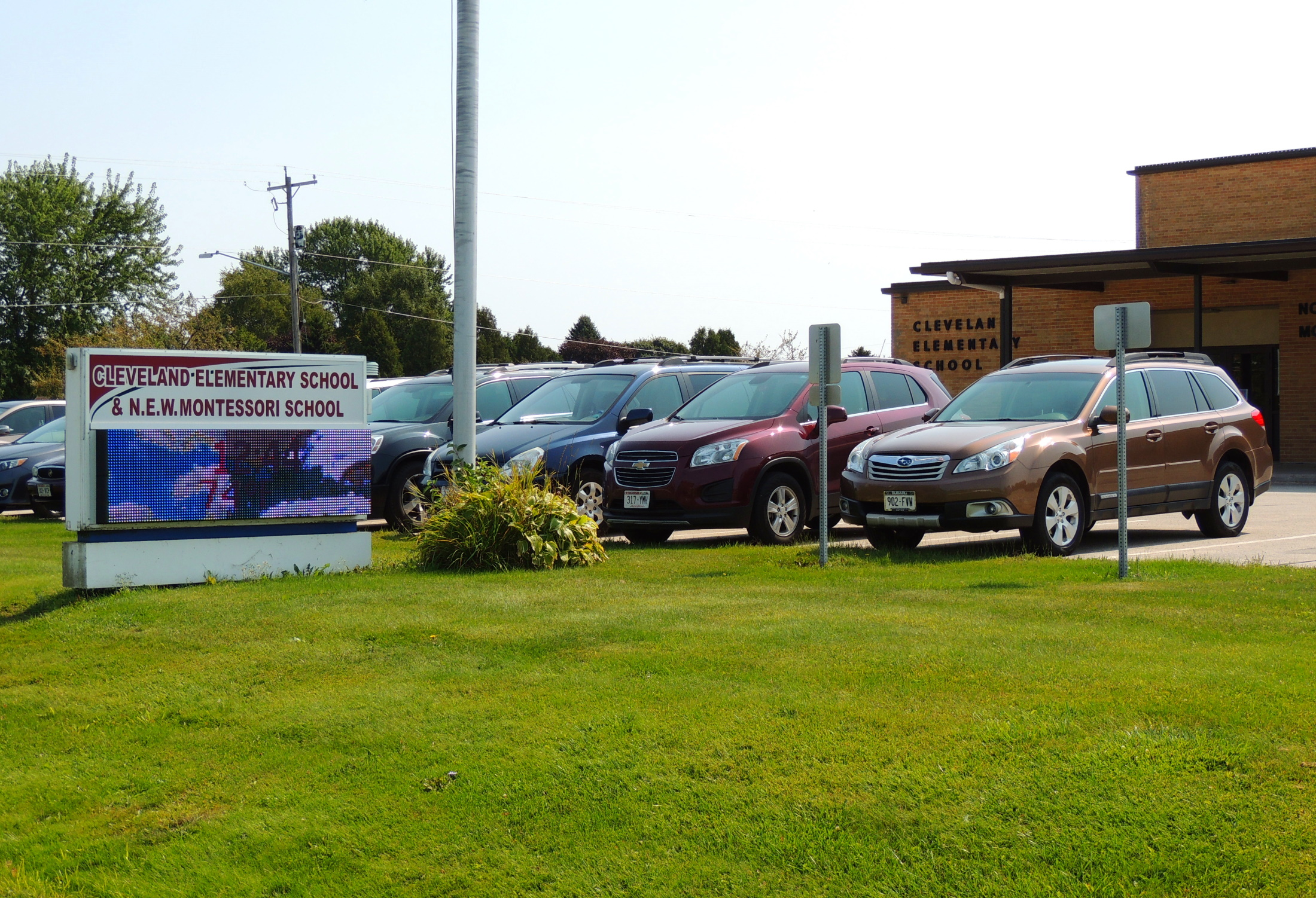
Cleveland Elementary School
