= Wisconsin's 9th Senate district =

State legislative district

Wisconsin's 9th State Senate district
- 2024 map defined in 2023 Wisc. Act 94; 2022 map defined in Johnson v. Wisconsin Elections Commission; 2011 map was defined in 2011 Wisc. Act 43 composed of Assembly districts 25, 26, and 27
Senator
Devin LeMahieu; R–Oostburg
since January 3, 2015 (11 years, 55 days)
- Demographics: 86.17% White; 2.17% Black; 5.17% Hispanic; 4.46% Asian; 1.63% Native American; 0.1% Hawaiian/Pacific Islander
- Population (2020) • Voting age: 178,886; 140,758
- Website: Official website
- Notes: Eastern Wisconsin

The 9th Senate district of Wisconsin is one of 33 districts in the Wisconsin Senate. Located in eastern Wisconsin, the district comprises most of Sheboygan County and the parts of eastern and southern Manitowoc County and northeast Fond du Lac County. It contains the cities of Sheboygan, Manitowoc, Two Rivers, Plymouth, Kiel, and Sheboygan Falls, and the villages of Kohler, Oostburg, and Elkhart Lake. The district also contains Sheboygan County Memorial Airport, Whistling Straits golf course, Road America motorsport course, Kohler-Andrae State Park, Lakeland University, and the University of Wisconsin–Green Bay, Sheboygan Campus.

== Current elected officials ==
Devin LeMahieu is the senator representing the 9th district. He was first elected in the 2014 general election.

Each Wisconsin State Senate district is composed of three Wisconsin State Assembly districts. The 9th Senate district comprises the 25th, 26th, and 27th Assembly districts. The current representatives of those districts are:

- Assembly District 25: Paul Tittl (R–Manitowoc)
- Assembly District 26: Joe Sheehan (D–Sheboygan)
- Assembly District 27: Lindee Brill (R–Sheboygan Falls)

The district is located entirely within Wisconsin's 6th congressional district, which is represented by U.S. Representative Glenn Grothman.

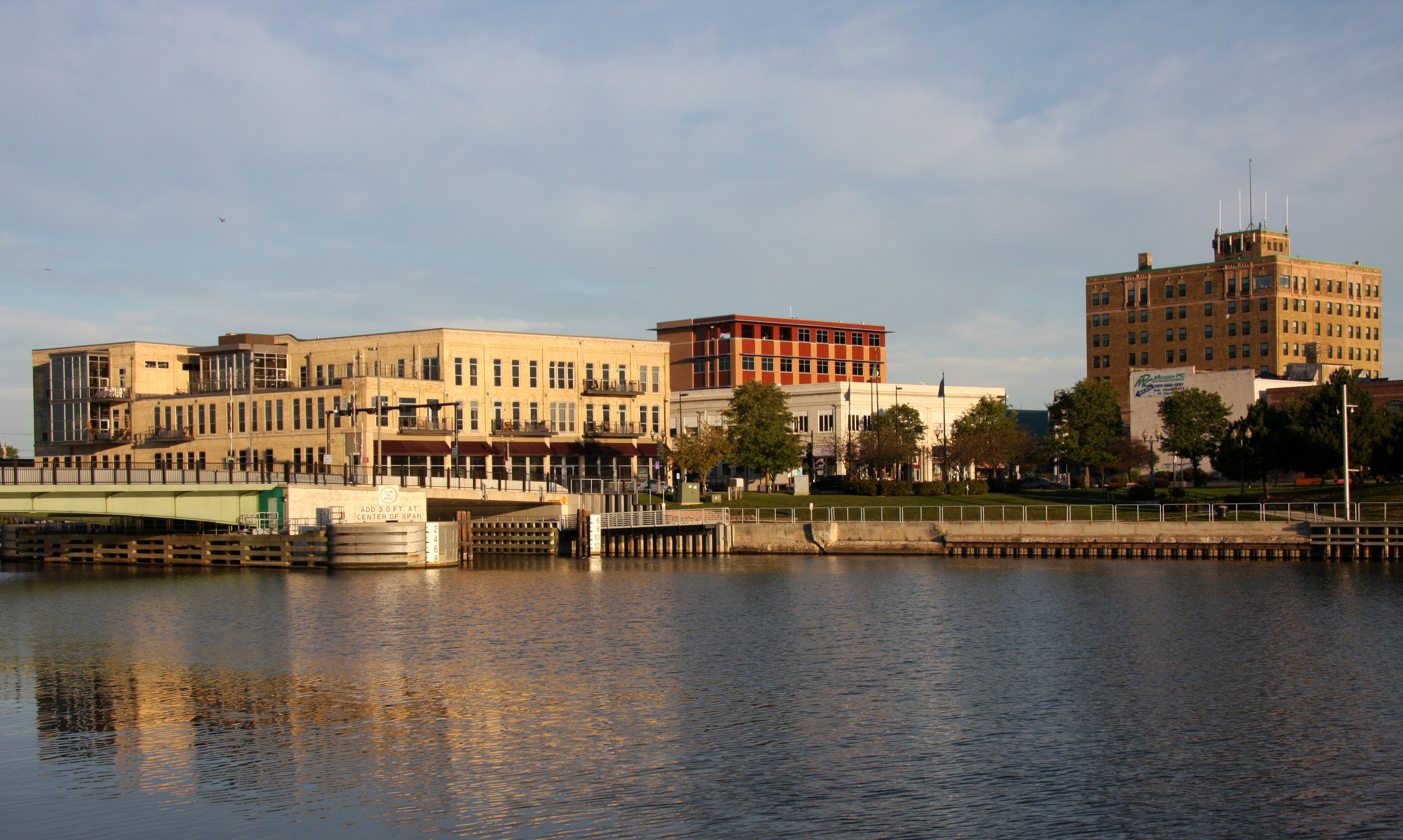
Manitowoc, Wisconsin

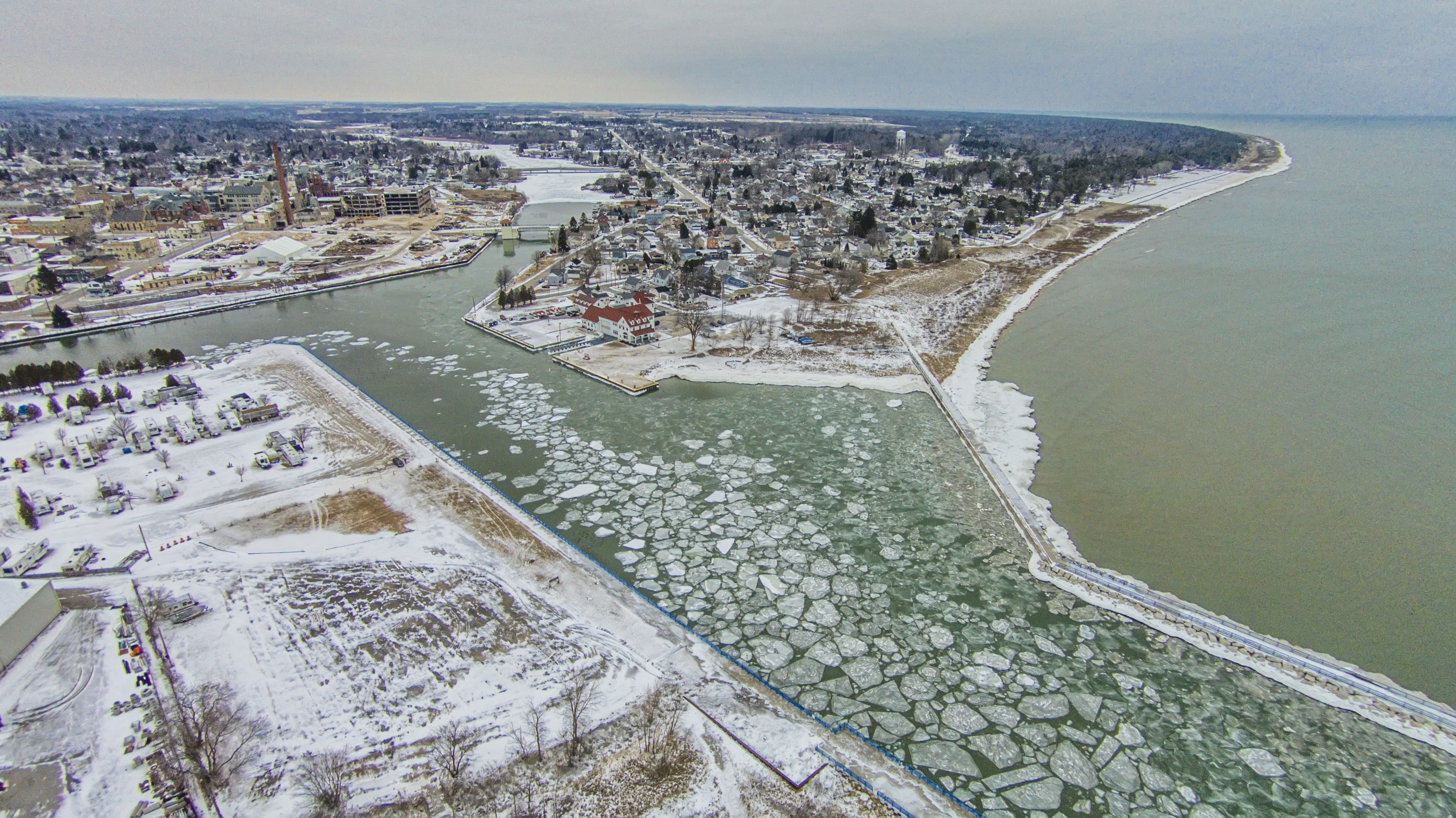
Two Rivers harbor

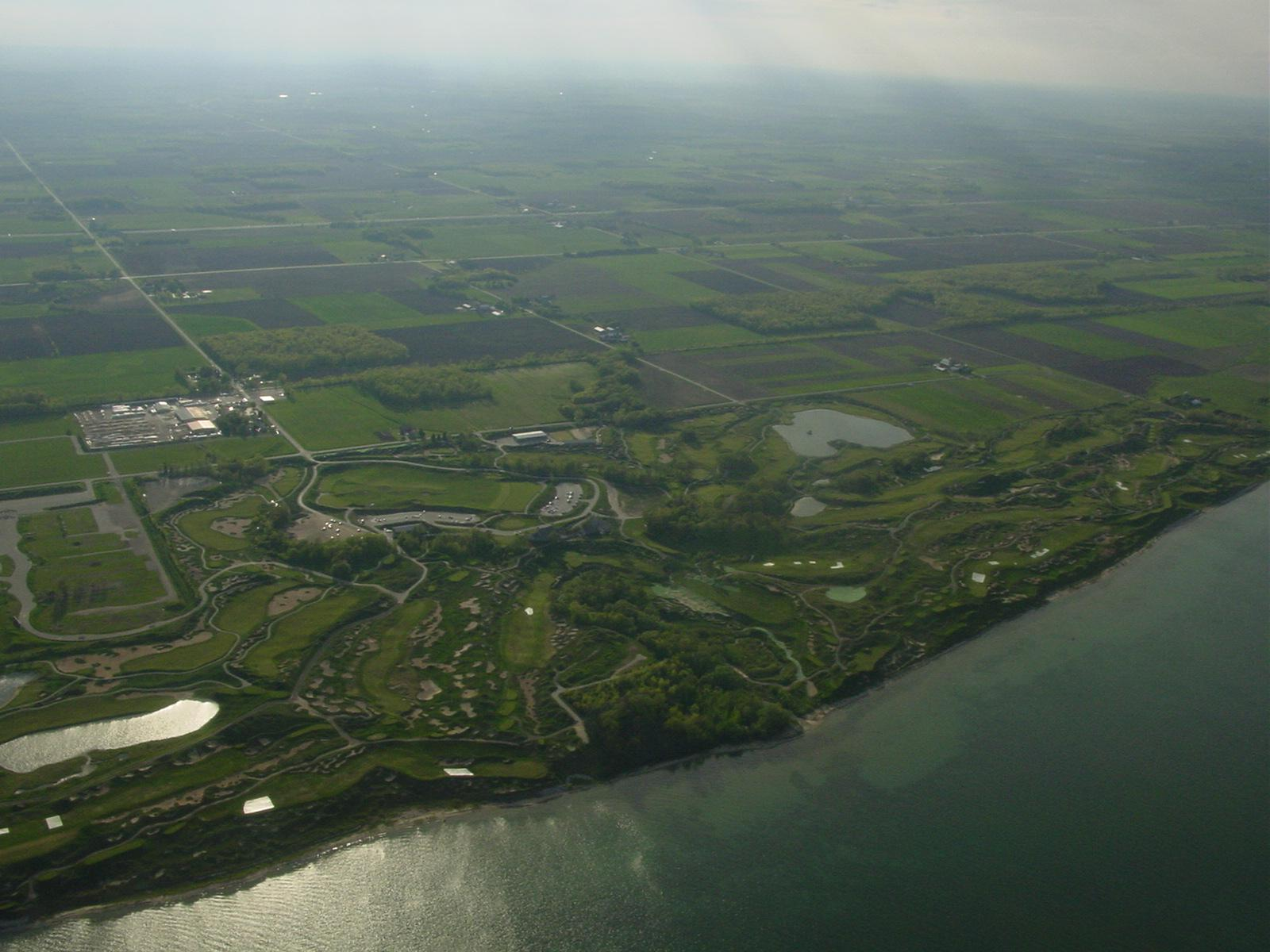
Aerial view of Whistling Straits golf course

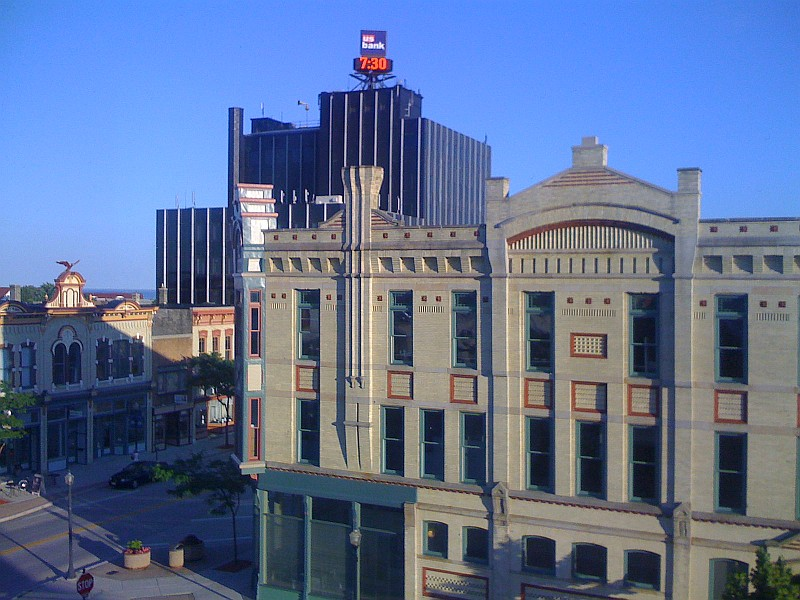
Downtown Sheboygan, Wisconsin

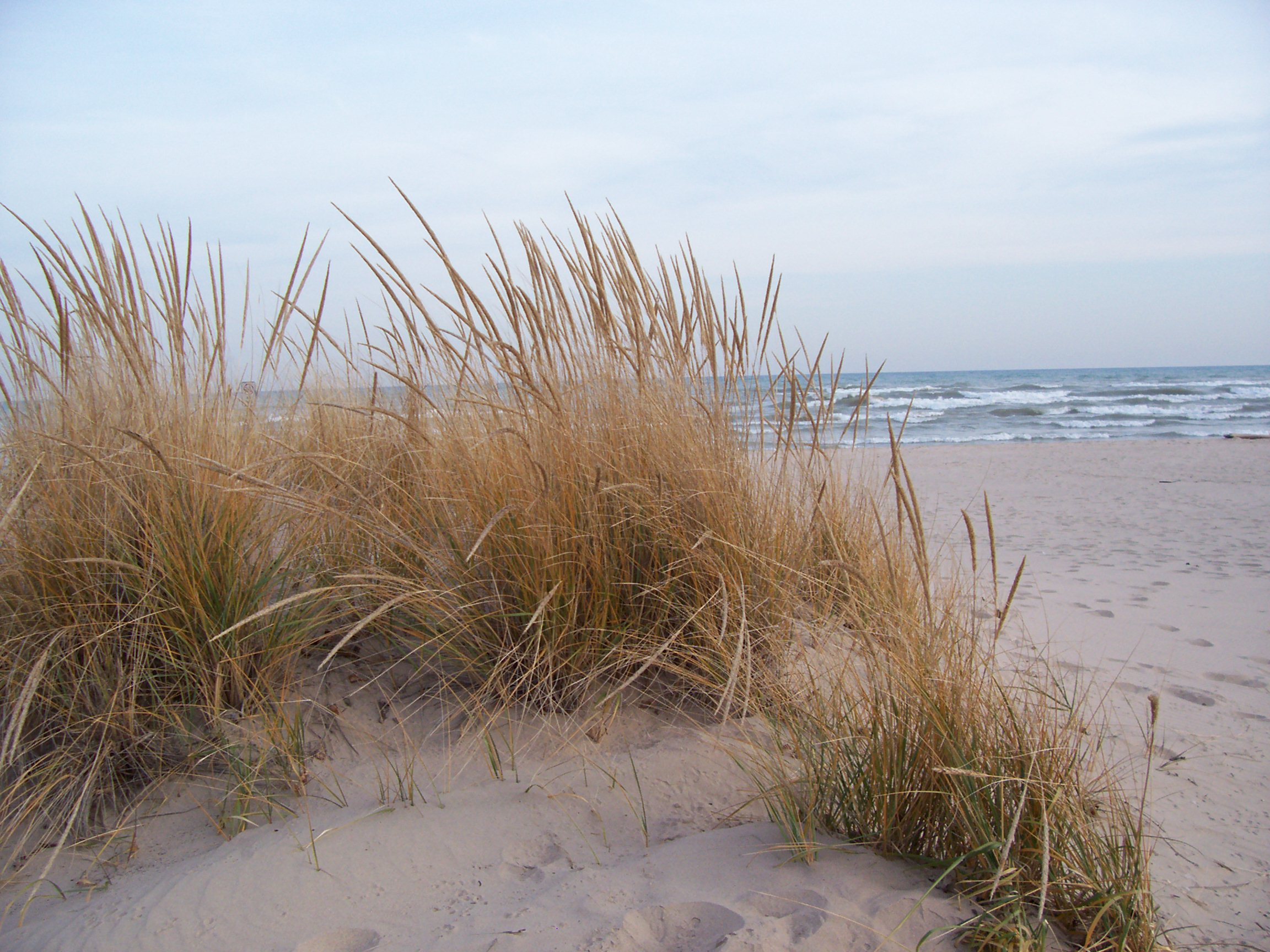
American Marram Grass dunes with Lake Michigan in background within Kohler-Andrae State Park

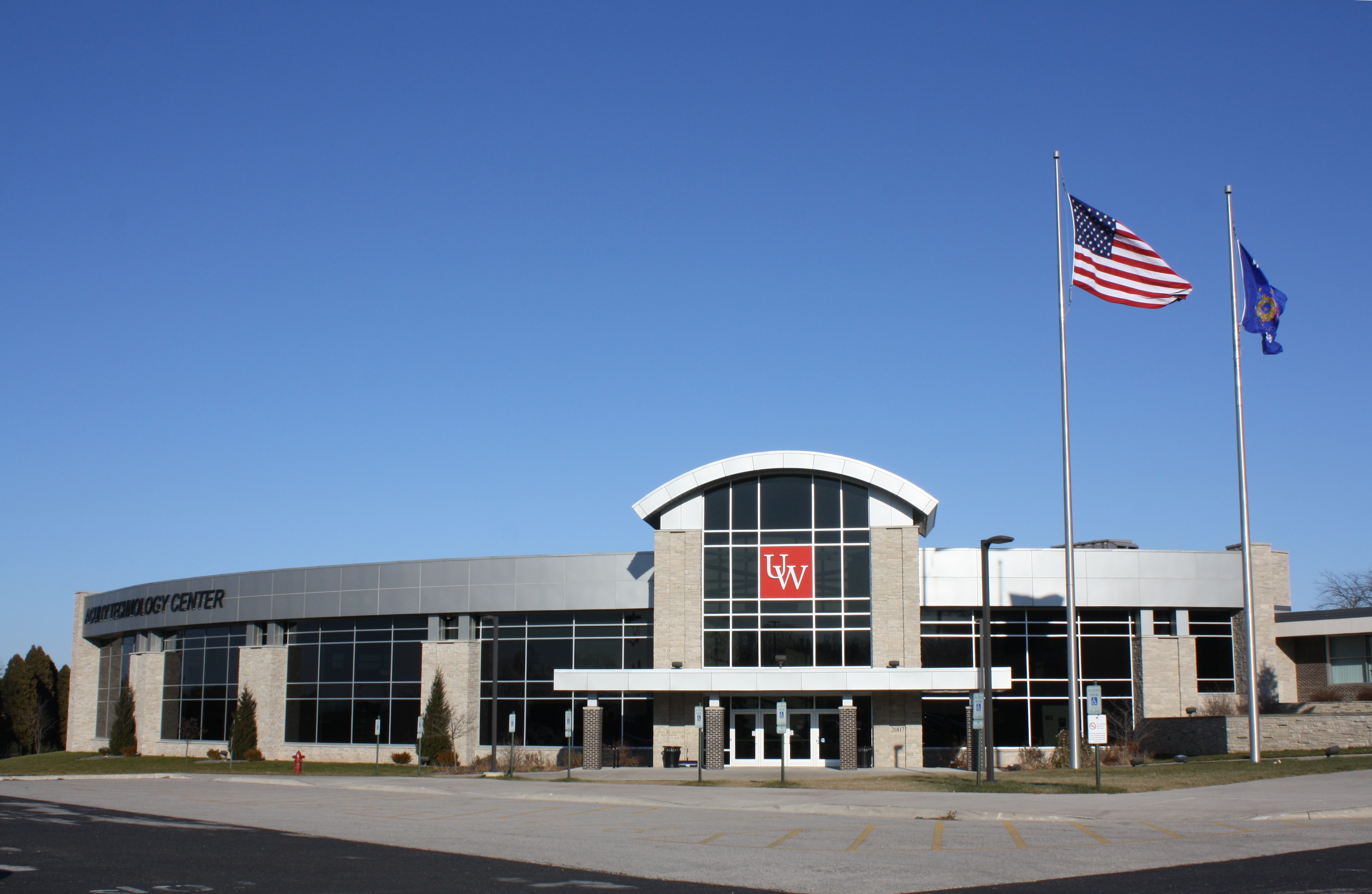
University of Wisconsin–Green Bay, Sheboygan Campus

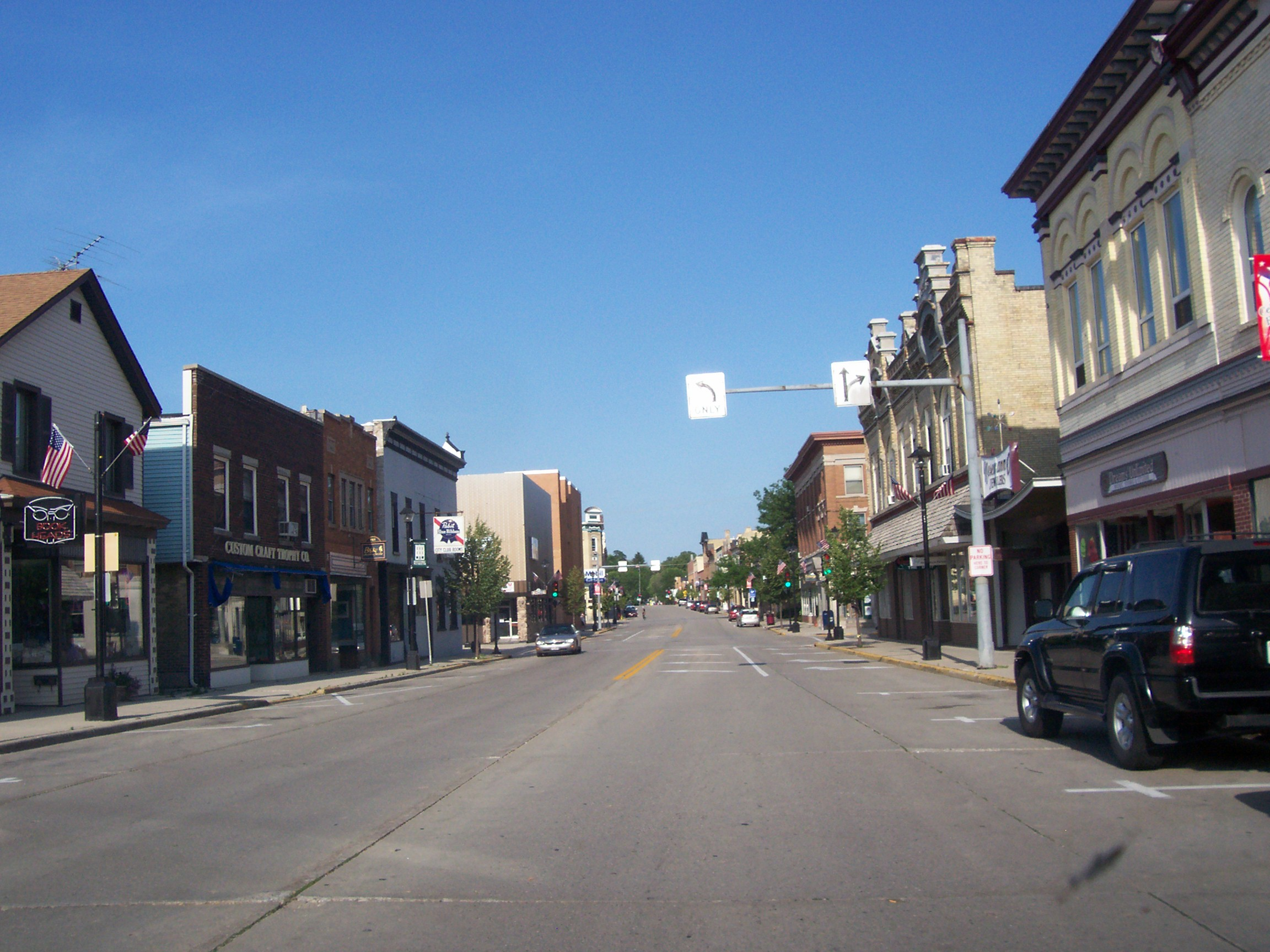
City of Plymouth

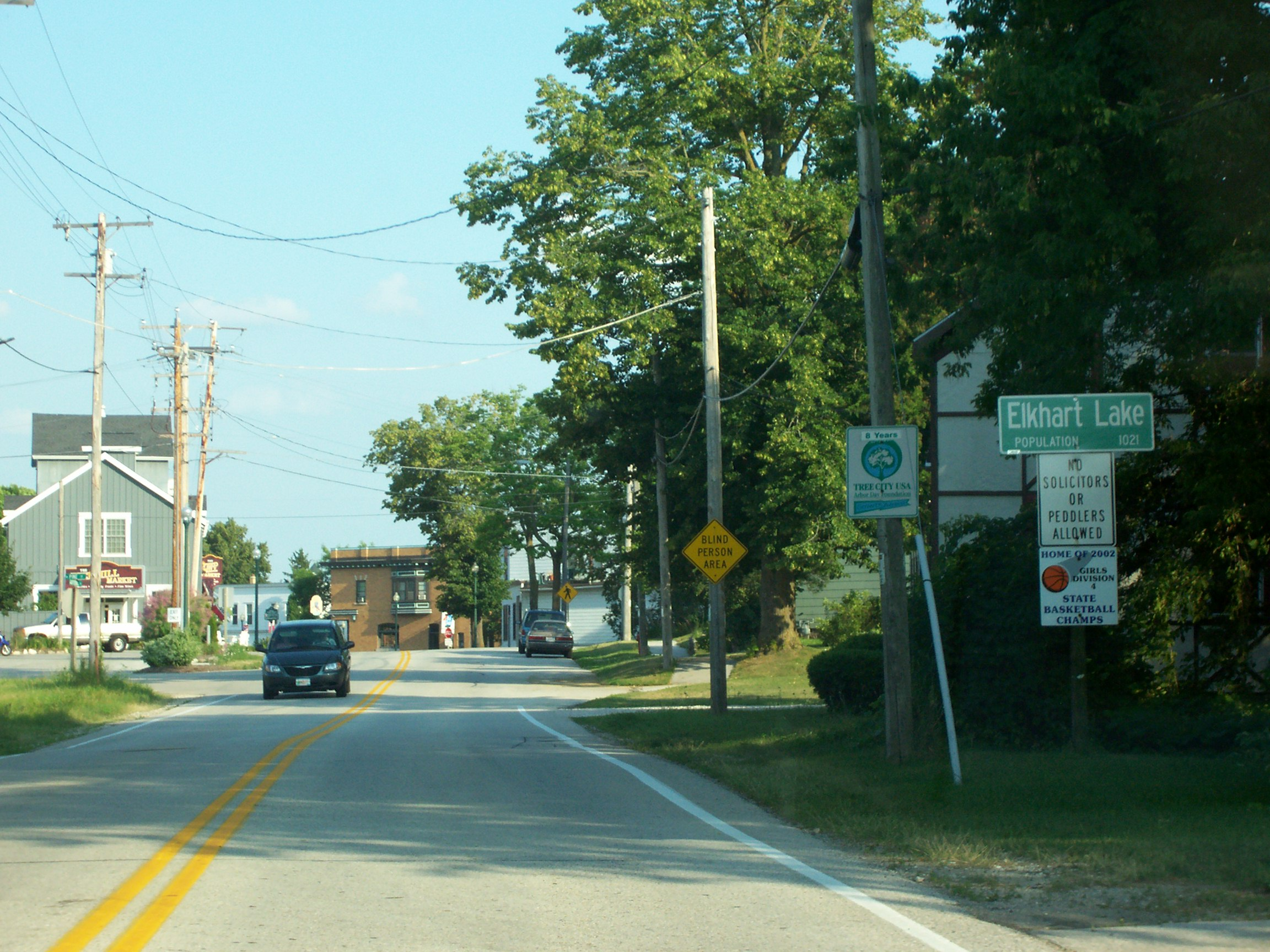
Village of Elkhart Lake

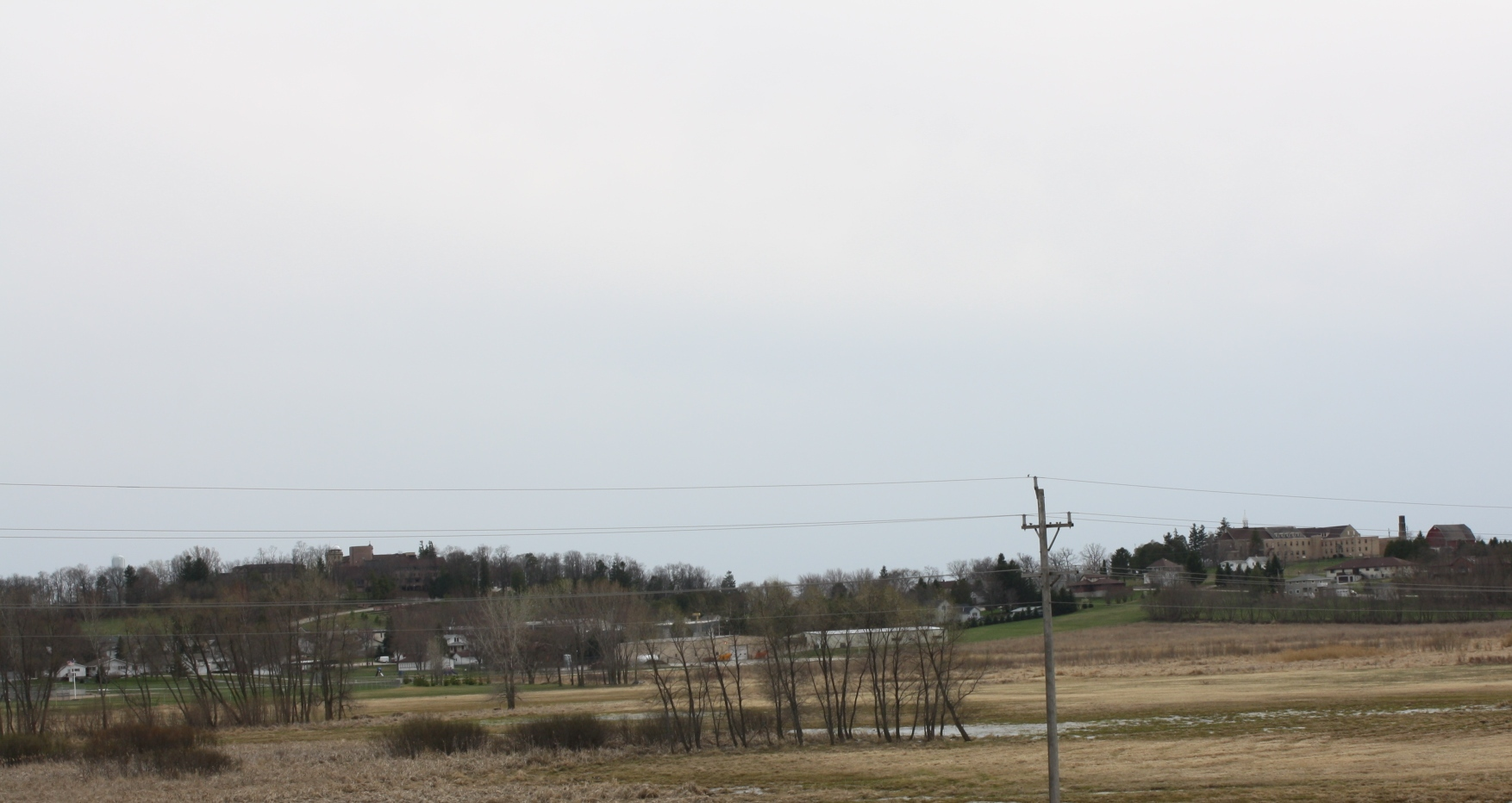
Mount Calvary

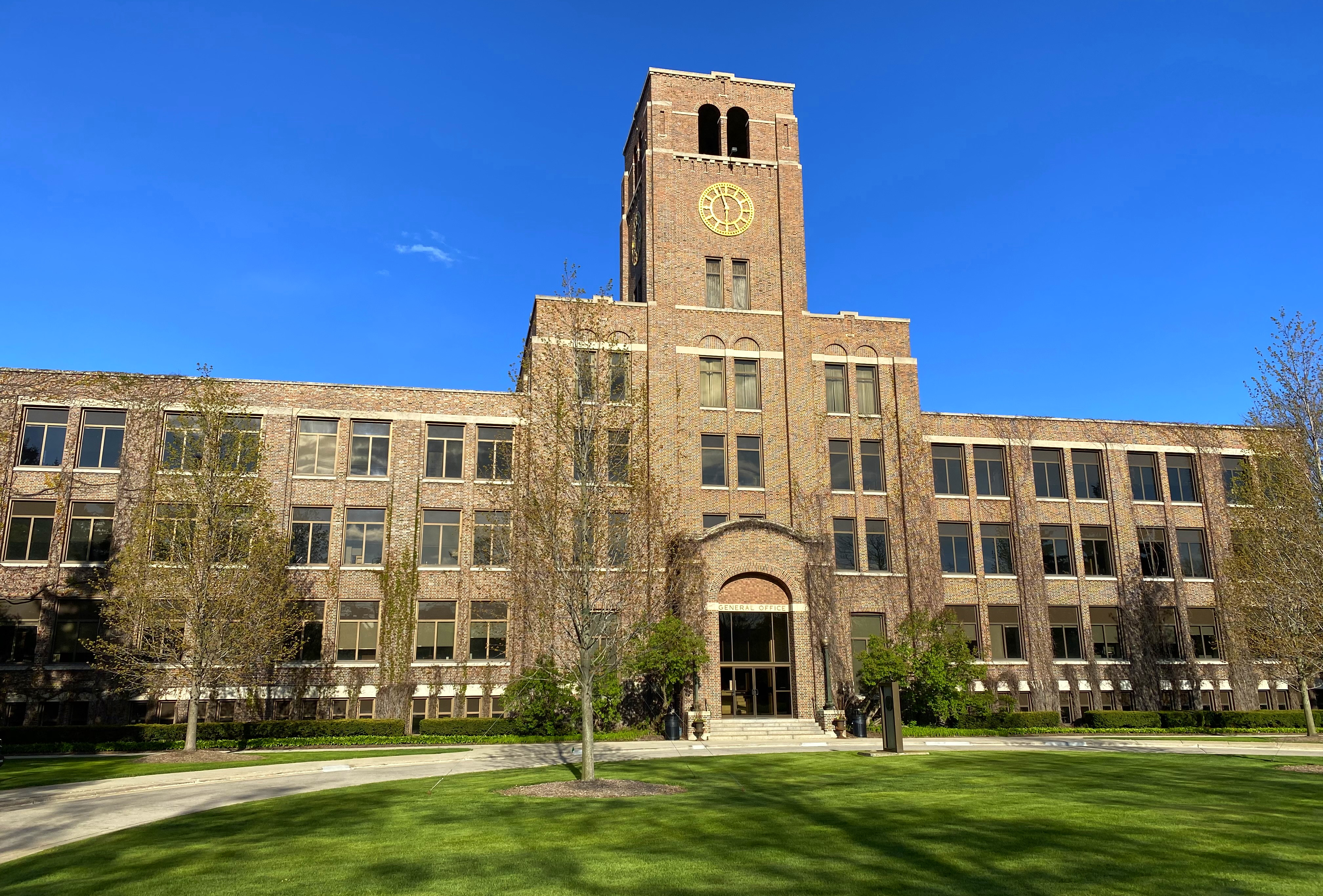
Kohler Co. main office

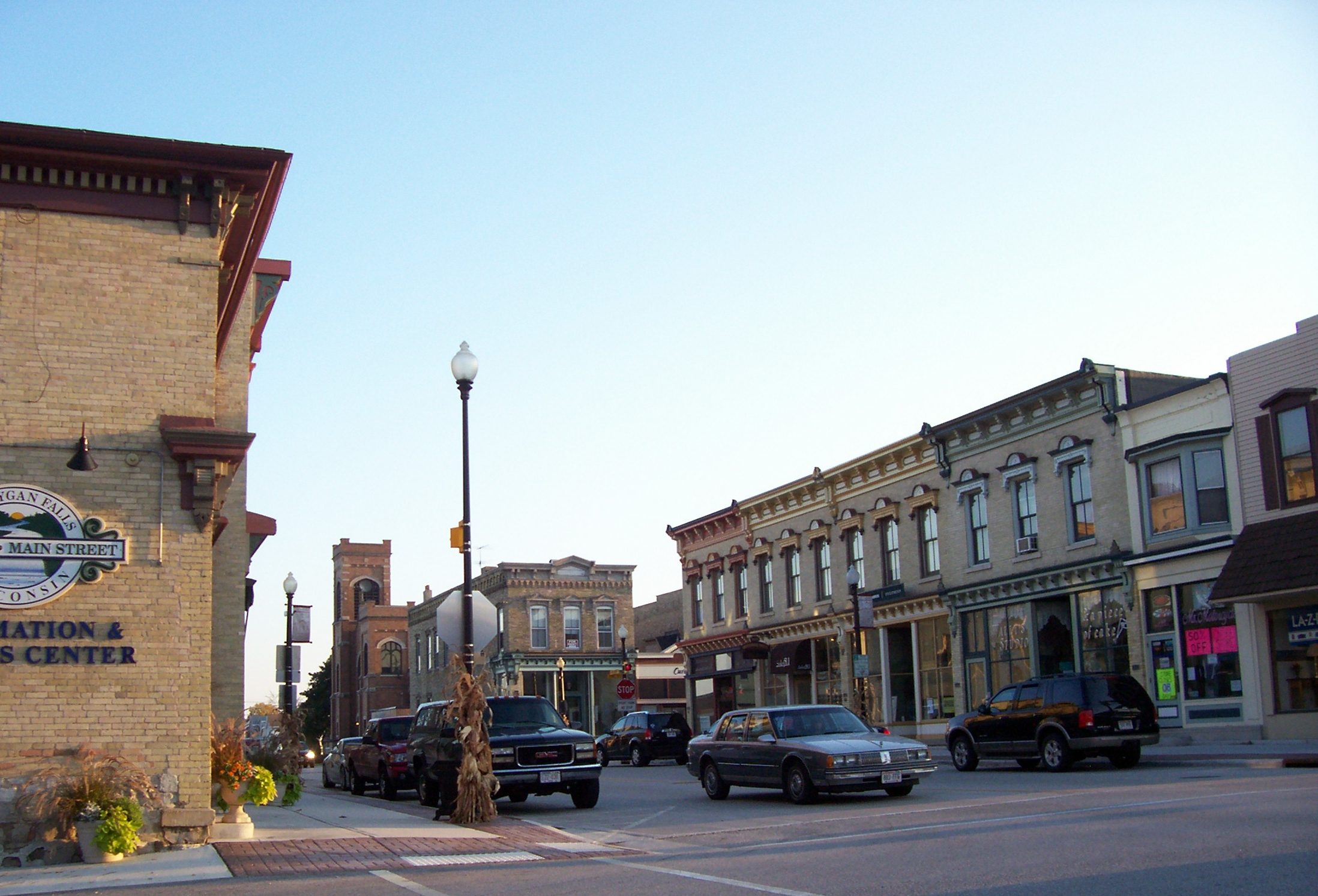
downtown Sheboygan Falls

== Past senators ==
Note: the boundaries of districts have changed repeatedly over history. Previous politicians of a specific numbered district have represented a completely different geographic area, due to redistricting.

The district has previously been represented by:

Senator	Party	Notes	Session	Years	District Definition
District created				1848	Dane County
Simeon Mills	Dem.		1st	1848	Dane County
Alexander Botkin	Whig		2nd	1849	Dane County
Alexander Botkin	Whig		3rd	1850	Dane County
Eliab B. Dean Jr.	Dem.		4th	1851	Dane County
Eliab B. Dean Jr.	Dem.		5th	1852	Dane County
George R. McLane	Dem.		6th	1853	Northern Waukesha County: Town of Brookfield; Town of Delafield; Town of Lisbon; Town of Menomonee; Town of Merton; Town of Oconomowoc; Town of Pewaukee; Town of Summit
George R. McLane	Dem.		7th	1854	Northern Waukesha County: Town of Brookfield; Town of Delafield; Town of Lisbon; Town of Menomonee; Town of Merton; Town of Oconomowoc; Town of Pewaukee; Town of Summit
Denison Worthington	Rep.		8th	1855	Northern Waukesha County: Town of Brookfield; Town of Delafield; Town of Lisbon; Town of Menomonee; Town of Merton; Town of Oconomowoc; Town of Pewaukee; Town of Summit
Denison Worthington	Rep.		9th	1856	Northern Waukesha County: Town of Brookfield; Town of Delafield; Town of Lisbon; Town of Menomonee; Town of Merton; Town of Oconomowoc; Town of Pewaukee; Town of Summit
John T. Kingston	Rep.		10th	1857	Adams, Juneau, Sauk counties
John T. Kingston	Rep.		11th	1858	Adams, Juneau, Sauk counties
H. W. Curtis	Rep.		12th	1859	Adams, Juneau, Sauk counties
H. W. Curtis	Rep.		13th	1860	Adams, Juneau, Sauk counties
John T. Kingston	Rep.		14th	1861	Adams, Juneau, Sauk counties
John T. Kingston	Rep.		15th	1862	Adams, Juneau, Waushara counties
Alanson M. Kimball	Rep.		16th	1863	Adams, Juneau, Waushara counties
Alanson M. Kimball	Natl. Union		17th	1864	Adams, Juneau, Waushara counties
Henry G. Webb	Natl. Union		18th	1865	Adams, Juneau, Waushara counties
Henry G. Webb	Natl. Union		19th	1866	Adams, Juneau, Waushara counties
DeWitt C. Wilson	Natl. Union		20th	1867	Adams, Juneau, Monroe counties
DeWitt C. Wilson	Rep.		21st	1868	Adams, Juneau, Monroe counties
William J. Kershaw	Rep.		22nd	1869	Adams, Juneau, Monroe counties
William J. Kershaw	Rep.		23rd	1870	Adams, Juneau, Monroe counties
Eliphalet S. Miner	Rep.	Redistricted to 29th district.	24th	1871	Adams, Juneau, Monroe counties
Francis Little	Rep.	Redistricted from 15th district.	25th	1872	Iowa County
Francis Little	Rep.	Redistricted from 15th district.	26th	1873	Iowa County
Francis Little	Rep.	Redistricted from 15th district.	27th	1874	Iowa County
David McFarland	Rep.		28th	1875	Iowa County
David McFarland	Dem.		29th	1876	Iowa County
Hobart S. Sacket	Rep.		30th	1877	Green Lake, Marquette, Waushara counties
Hobart S. Sacket	Rep.		31st	1878	Green Lake, Marquette, Waushara counties
Hobart S. Sacket	Rep.		32nd	1879	Green Lake, Marquette, Waushara counties
Hobart S. Sacket	Rep.		33rd	1880	Green Lake, Marquette, Waushara counties
James F. Wiley	Rep.		34th	1881	Green Lake, Marquette, Waushara counties
James F. Wiley	Rep.		35th	1882	Green Lake, Marquette, Waushara counties
James F. Wiley	Rep.		36th	1883–1884	Green Lake, Portage, Waushara counties
James F. Wiley	Rep.		37th	1885–1886	Green Lake, Portage, Waushara counties
George Fitch	Rep.		38th	1887–1888	Green Lake, Portage, Waushara counties
George Fitch	Rep.		39th	1889–1890	Green Lake, Portage, Waushara and Western Marathon County: Town of Bergen; Town of Brighton; Town of Cleveland; Town of Day; Town of Eau Pleine; Town of Halsey; Town of Holton; Town of Hull; Town of Johnson; Town of Marathon; Town of Mosinee; Town of Rietbrock; Town of Spencer; Town of Wien; Village of Marathon
Ferdinand T. Yahr	Dem.		40th	1891–1892	Green Lake, Portage, Waushara and Western Marathon County: Town of Bergen; Town of Brighton; Town of Cleveland; Town of Day; Town of Eau Pleine; Town of Halsey; Town of Holton; Town of Hull; Town of Johnson; Town of Marathon; Town of Mosinee; Town of Rietbrock; Town of Spencer; Town of Wien; Village of Marathon
Ferdinand T. Yahr	Dem.		41st	1893–1894	Adams, Green Lake, Juneau, Marquette counties
Clarence V. Peirce	Rep.		42nd	1895–1896	Adams, Green Lake, Juneau, Marquette counties
Clarence V. Peirce	Rep.		43rd	1897–1898	1896–1901 1902–1911; Adams, Marquette, Waushara, Wood counties
Thomas Fearne	Rep.		44th	1899–1900	1896–1901 1902–1911; Adams, Marquette, Waushara, Wood counties
Thomas Fearne	Rep.		45th	1901–1902	1896–1901 1902–1911; Adams, Marquette, Waushara, Wood counties
Herman C. Wipperman	Rep.		46th	1903–1904	1896–1901 1902–1911; Adams, Marquette, Waushara, Wood counties
Herman C. Wipperman	Rep.		47th	1905–1906	1896–1901 1902–1911; Adams, Marquette, Waushara, Wood counties
Theodore W. Brazeau	Rep.		48th	1907–1908	1896–1901 1902–1911; Adams, Marquette, Waushara, Wood counties
Theodore W. Brazeau	Rep.		49th	1909–1910	1896–1901 1902–1911; Adams, Marquette, Waushara, Wood counties
Edward F. Kileen	Rep.		50th	1911–1912	1896–1901 1902–1911; Adams, Marquette, Waushara, Wood counties
Edward F. Kileen	Rep.		51st	1913–1914	Central Milwaukee County: Wards 1, 2, 3, 4, city of Milwaukee
David V. Jennings	Dem.		52nd	1915–1916	Central Milwaukee County: Wards 1, 2, 3, 4, city of Milwaukee
David V. Jennings	Dem.		53rd	1917–1918	Central Milwaukee County: Wards 1, 2, 3, 4, city of Milwaukee
David V. Jennings	Dem.		54th	1919–1920	Central Milwaukee County: Wards 1, 2, 3, 4, city of Milwaukee
David V. Jennings	Dem.		55th	1921–1922	Central Milwaukee County: Wards 1, 2, 3, 4, city of Milwaukee
Ben H. Mahon	Rep.	Died Oct. 1924.	56th	1923–1924	Central Milwaukee County: Wards 1, 2, 3, 4, city of Milwaukee
Irving P. Mehigan	Rep.	Won 1924 special election.	57th	1925–1926	Central Milwaukee County: Wards 1, 2, 3, 4, city of Milwaukee
Irving P. Mehigan	Rep.	Won 1924 special election.	58th	1927–1928	Central Milwaukee County: Wards 1, 2, 3, 4, city of Milwaukee
Irving P. Mehigan	Rep.	Won 1924 special election.	59th	1929–1930	Central Milwaukee County: Wards 1, 2, 3, 4, city of Milwaukee
Irving P. Mehigan	Rep.	Won 1924 special election.	60th	1931–1932	Central Milwaukee County: Wards 1, 2, 3, 4, city of Milwaukee
Irving P. Mehigan	Rep.	Won 1924 special election.	61st	1933–1934	Central Milwaukee County: Wards 1, 3, 4, 6, city of Milwaukee
James L. Callan	Dem.		62nd	1935–1936	Central Milwaukee County: Wards 1, 3, 4, 6, city of Milwaukee
James L. Callan	Dem.		63rd	1937–1938	Central Milwaukee County: Wards 1, 3, 4, 6, city of Milwaukee
Cornelius T. Young	Dem.		64th	1939–1940	Central Milwaukee County: Wards 1, 3, 4, 6, city of Milwaukee
Cornelius T. Young	Dem.		65th	1941–1942	Central Milwaukee County: Wards 1, 3, 4, 6, city of Milwaukee
Robert E. Tehan	Dem.	Resigned after appointed U.S. Dist. Judge, E.D. Wis.	66th	1943–1944	Central Milwaukee County: Wards 1, 3, 4, 6, city of Milwaukee
Robert E. Tehan	Dem.	Resigned after appointed U.S. Dist. Judge, E.D. Wis.	67th	1945–1946	Central Milwaukee County: Wards 1, 3, 4, 6, city of Milwaukee
Robert E. Tehan	Dem.	Resigned after appointed U.S. Dist. Judge, E.D. Wis.	68th	1947–1948	Central Milwaukee County: Wards 1, 3, 4, 6, city of Milwaukee
Robert E. Tehan	Dem.	Resigned after appointed U.S. Dist. Judge, E.D. Wis.	69th	1949–1950	Central Milwaukee County: Wards 1, 3, 4, 6, city of Milwaukee
Vacant			69th	1949–1950	Central Milwaukee County: Wards 1, 3, 4, 6, city of Milwaukee
Henry Maier	Dem.	Resigned in 1960 to become Mayor of Milwaukee.	70th	1951–1952	Central Milwaukee County: Wards 1, 3, 4, 6, city of Milwaukee
Henry Maier	Dem.	Resigned in 1960 to become Mayor of Milwaukee.	71st	1953–1954	Central Milwaukee County: Wards 1, 3, 4, 6, city of Milwaukee
Henry Maier	Dem.	Resigned in 1960 to become Mayor of Milwaukee.	72nd	1955–1956	Central Milwaukee County: Wards 2, 3, 6, city of Milwaukee
Henry Maier	Dem.	Resigned in 1960 to become Mayor of Milwaukee.	73rd	1957–1958	Central Milwaukee County: Wards 2, 3, 6, city of Milwaukee
Henry Maier	Dem.	Resigned in 1960 to become Mayor of Milwaukee.	74th	1959–1960	Central Milwaukee County: Wards 2, 3, 6, city of Milwaukee
Vacant			74th	1959–1960	Central Milwaukee County: Wards 2, 3, 6, city of Milwaukee
Norman Sussman	Dem.	Died April 1969.	75th	1961–1962	Central Milwaukee County: Wards 2, 3, 6, city of Milwaukee
Norman Sussman	Dem.	Died April 1969.	76th	1963–1964	Central Milwaukee County: Wards 2, 3, 6, city of Milwaukee
Norman Sussman	Dem.	Died April 1969.	77th	1965–1966	North-central Milwaukee County: Wards 1, 2, 3, city of Glendale; Wards 4, 6, 13, city of Milwaukee
Norman Sussman	Dem.	Died April 1969.	78th	1967–1968	North-central Milwaukee County: Wards 1, 2, 3, city of Glendale; Wards 4, 6, 13, city of Milwaukee
Norman Sussman	Dem.	Died April 1969.	79th	1969–1970	North-central Milwaukee County: Wards 1, 2, 3, city of Glendale; Wards 4, 6, 13, city of Milwaukee
Vacant			79th	1969–1970	North-central Milwaukee County: Wards 1, 2, 3, city of Glendale; Wards 4, 6, 13, city of Milwaukee
Ronald G. Parys	Dem.	Won 1969 special election.	79th	1969–1970	North-central Milwaukee County: Wards 1, 2, 3, city of Glendale; Wards 4, 6, 13, city of Milwaukee
Ronald G. Parys	Dem.	Won 1969 special election.	80th	1971–1972	North-central Milwaukee County: Wards 1, 2, 3, city of Glendale; Wards 4, 6, 13, city of Milwaukee
Ronald G. Parys	Dem.	Won 1969 special election.	81st	1973–1974	Central Milwaukee County: Part of the city of Milwaukee
Ronald G. Parys	Dem.	Won 1969 special election.	82nd	1975–1976	Central Milwaukee County: Part of the city of Milwaukee
Ronald G. Parys	Dem.	Won 1969 special election.	83rd	1977–1978	Central Milwaukee County: Part of the city of Milwaukee
Jim Moody	Dem.		84th	1979–1980	Central Milwaukee County: Part of the city of Milwaukee
Jim Moody	Dem.		85th	1981–1982	Central Milwaukee County: Part of the city of Milwaukee
Carl Otte	Dem.		86th	1983–1984	Southeast Calumet County, eastern Fond du Lac County, southern Manitowoc County, and most of Sheboygan County: Calumet County; Town of New Holstein; City of New Holstein; Fond du Lac County; Town of Calumet; Town of Marshfield; Town of Osceola; Town of Taycheedah; Village of Mount Calvary; Village of St. Cloud; Manitowoc County; Town of Centerville; Town of Liberty; Town of Manitowoc; Town of Meeme; Town of Newton; Town of Schleswig; Village of Cleveland; Village of St. Nazianz; City of Kiel; City of Manitowoc; Sheboygan County; Town of Greenbush; Town of Herman; Town of Lyndon; Town of Mitchell; Town of Mosel; Town of Plymouth; Town of Rhine; Town of Russell; Town of Scott; Town of Sheboygan; Town of Sheboygan Falls; Town of Sherman; Village of Adell; Village of Cascade; Village of Elkhart Lake; Village of Glenbeulah; Village of Howards Grove; Village of Kohler; Village of Random Lake; Village of Waldo; City of Plymouth; City of Sheboygan Falls; Wards 1-6, 9-16, city of Sheboygan
Carl Otte	Dem.		87th	1985–1986	Southeast Calumet County, southern Manitowoc County, and most of Sheboygan County: Calumet County; Town of New Holstein; City of New Holstein; Manitowoc County; Town of Centerville; Town of Liberty; Town of Manitowoc; Town of Meeme; Town of Newton; Town of Schleswig; Village of Cleveland; Village of St. Nazianz; Village of Valders; City of Kiel; City of Manitowoc; Sheboygan County; Town of Greenbush; Town of Herman; Town of Lima; Town of Lyndon; Town of Mitchell; Town of Mosel; Town of Plymouth; Town of Rhine; Town of Russell; Town of Sheboygan; Town of Sheboygan Falls; Town of Wilson; Village of Cascade; Village of Elkhart Lake; Village of Glenbeulah; Village of Howards Grove; Village of Kohler; Village of Waldo; City of Plymouth; City of Sheboygan; City of Sheboygan Falls; Ward 2, Town of Holland
William Te Winkle	Dem.		88th	1987–1988	
William Te Winkle	Dem.		89th	1989–1990	
Calvin Potter	Dem.		90th	1991–1992	
Calvin Potter	Dem.		91st	1993–1994	Southeast Calumet County, southern Manitowoc County, and most of Sheboygan County: Calumet County; City of New Holstein; Wards 2, 3, town of New Holstein; Manitowoc County; Town of Centerville; Town of Liberty; Town of Manitowoc; Town of Manitowoc Rapids; Town of Meeme; Town of Newton; Town of Schleswig; Village of Cleveland; Village of St. Nazianz; Village of Valders; City of Kiel; City of Manitowoc; Sheboygan County; Town of Greenbush; Town of Herman; Town of Lima; Town of Lyndon; Town of Mitchell; Town of Mosel; Town of Plymouth; Town of Rhine; Town of Russell; Town of Scott; Town of Sheboygan; Town of Sheboygan Falls; Town of Wilson; Village of Cascade; Village of Elkhart Lake; Village of Glenbeulah; Village of Howards Grove; Village of Kohler; Village of Waldo; City of Plymouth; City of Sheboygan; City of Sheboygan Falls
Calvin Potter	Dem.		92nd	1995–1996	
Calvin Potter	Dem.		93rd	1997–1998	
James Baumgart	Dem.		94th	1999–2000	
James Baumgart	Dem.		95th	2001–2002	
Joe Leibham	Rep.	Resigned Dec. 2014.	96th	2003–2004	Eastern Calumet County, eastern Fond du Lac County, southern Manitowoc County, and northern Sheboygan County: Calumet County; Town of Brothertown; Town of Charlestown; Town of New Holstein; Town of Rantoul; Village of Hilbert; Village of Potter; City of New Holstein; Fond du Lac County; Town of Calumet; Town of Forest; Town of Marshfield; Village of Mount Calvary; Village of St. Cloud; Manitowoc County; Town of Cato; Town of Centerville; Town of Eaton; Town of Liberty; Town of Manitowoc; Town of Manitowoc Rapids; Town of Meeme; Town of Newton; Town of Rockland; Town of Schleswig; Village of Cleveland; Village of Reedsville; Village of St. Nazianz; Village of Valders; Village of Whitelaw; City of Kiel; City of Manitowoc; Sheboygan County; Town of Greenbush; Town of Herman; Town of Mosel; Town of Plymouth; Town of Rhine; Town of Russell; Town of Sheboygan; Town of Sheboygan Falls; Village of Elkhart Lake; Village of Glenbeulah; Village of Howards Grove; Village of Kohler; City of Plymouth; City of Sheboygan; City of Sheboygan Falls
Joe Leibham	Rep.	Resigned Dec. 2014.	97th	2005–2006	
Joe Leibham	Rep.	Resigned Dec. 2014.	98th	2007–2008	
Joe Leibham	Rep.	Resigned Dec. 2014.	99th	2009–2010	
Joe Leibham	Rep.	Resigned Dec. 2014.	100th	2011–2012	
Joe Leibham	Rep.	Resigned Dec. 2014.	101st	2013–2014	Eastern Calumet County, most of Manitowoc County, and most of Sheboygan County: Calumet County; Town of Charlestown; Town of Chilton; Town of Rantoul; Village of Hilbert; Village of Potter; City of Chilton; Manitowoc County; Town of Cato; Town of Centerville; Town of Eaton; Town of Liberty; Town of Maple Grove; Town of Manitowoc; Town of Manitowoc Rapids; Town of Meeme; Town of Newton; Town of Rockland; Town of Schleswig; Village of Cleveland; Village of Reedsville; Village of St. Nazianz; Village of Valders; Village of Whitelaw; City of Kiel; City of Manitowoc; Sheboygan County; Town of Herman; Town of Holland; Town of Lima; Town of Mosel; Town of Plymouth; Town of Rhine; Town of Russell; Town of Sheboygan; Town of Sheboygan Falls; Town of Sherman; Town of Wilson; Village of Adell; Village of Cedar Grove; Village of Elkhart Lake; Village of Glenbeulah; Village of Howards Grove; Village of Kohler; Village of Oostburg; Village of Random Lake; City of Plymouth; City of Sheboygan; City of Sheboygan Falls
Devin LeMahieu	Rep.		102nd	2015–2016	
Devin LeMahieu	Rep.		103rd	2017–2018	
Devin LeMahieu	Rep.		104th	2019–2020	
Devin LeMahieu	Rep.		105th	2021–2022	
Devin LeMahieu	Rep.		106th	2023–2024	Most of Manitowoc County, Most of Sheboygan County, part of Calumet County
Devin LeMahieu	Rep.		107th	2025–2026	
