= H. W. Curtis =

19th century American politician

Member of the Wisconsin Senate from the 9th district
- In office January 3, 1859 – January 7, 1861
- Preceded by: John T. Kingston
- Succeeded by: John T. Kingston

Personal details
- Born: July 22, 1817 Oswego County, New York, U.S.
- Died: October 14, 1880 (aged 63) Peninsula Township, Michigan, U.S.
- Resting place: Ogdensburg Cemetery, Peninsula Township
- Party: Republican
- Spouse: Lucena Asenath Higbee (m. 1844–1880)
- Children: at least 2
- Occupation: Millwright

Henry W. Curtis (July 22, 1817 – October 14, 1880) was an American millwright, politician and Wisconsin pioneer. He was a member of the Wisconsin Senate, representing the 9th Senate district during the 1859 and 1860 sessions. In contemporaneous documents, his name was often abbreviated H. W. Curtis.

== Biography ==
H. W. Curtis was born in Oswego County, New York, in 1817. He lived for much of the 1840s in Ohio, where he was active in the abolitionist movement and was a frequent contributor to the abolitionist newspaper The Anti-Slavery Bugle.

He moved to the new state of Wisconsin about 1853 and settled in Sauk County, Wisconsin. He quickly became involved in local temperance and abolitionist organizations, and became one of the trustees of the Delton Academy. Through his activism, he became involved with the new Republican Party of Wisconsin when it was created in 1854. Sometime in the 1850s, he resided in New Lisbon, Wisconsin, and was editor of the short-lived partisan newspaper, the New Lisbon Republican, but he ultimately returned to Sauk County sometime before 1858, residing then in Delton, Wisconsin.

In 1858, he was elected to the Wisconsin Senate, running on the Republican Party ticket. He served in the 1859 and 1860 sessions of the Legislature. It does not appear that he ran for renomination in 1860.

It seems he subsequently moved to Baraboo, Wisconsin, where he was involved with the Baraboo Paper Manufacturing Company. He later moved to Grand Traverse County, Michigan, where he died in 1880.

== Personal life and family ==
Henry Curtis married Lucena Asenath Higbee, in 1844.

Wisconsin Senate
Preceded by John T. Kingston	Member of the Wisconsin Senate from the 9th district January 3, 1859 – January 7, 1861	Succeeded by John T. Kingston
