= George Fitch =

George Fitch may refer to:

- George Ashmore Fitch (1883–1979), American missionary to China
- George B. Fitch (1948–2014), American businessman and politician
- George Fitch (author) (1877–1915), American humorist
- George Fitch (Wisconsin politician) (1848–1896), member of the Wisconsin Senate
