= Francis Little (American politician) =

19th century American politician

Member of the Wisconsin Senate
- In office January 1, 1872 – January 4, 1875
- Preceded by: Eliphalet S. Miner
- Succeeded by: David McFarland
- Constituency: 9th Senate district
- In office January 2, 1871 – January 1, 1872
- Preceded by: Lemuel W. Joiner
- Succeeded by: Carl H. Schmidt
- Constituency: 15th Senate district

Member of the Wisconsin State Assembly from the Iowa 2nd district
- In office January 4, 1864 – January 1, 1866
- Preceded by: John H. Vivian
- Succeeded by: James Spensley

Personal details
- Born: February 23, 1822 County Fermanagh, Ireland, UK
- Died: January 6, 1890 (aged 67) Linden, Wisconsin, U.S.
- Resting place: Graceland Cemetery, Mineral Point, Wisconsin
- Party: Republican; Natl. Union (1860s)
- Spouse: Susannah Fawcett (m. 1851–1890)
- Children: Margaret Elizabeth (Clarke)^{(b. 1853; died 1952)}; Mary Alice (Bleakly)^{(b. 1858; died 1917)}; Lucy Ann Little^{(b. 1860; died 1861)}; John Francis Little^{(b. 1862; died 1863)}; Martha Lucinda Little^{(b. 1864; died 1882)}; Sarah Elinor Little^{(b. 1866; died 1957)}; Francis Fawcett Little^{(b. 1868; died 1895)}; Susannah Clarke Little^{(b. 1872; died 1927)}; William David Little^{(b. 1875; died 1967)}
- Occupation: Farmer

Francis Little (February 23, 1822 – January 6, 1890) was an Irish American immigrant, Wisconsin pioneer, and Republican politician. He was a member of the Wisconsin State Senate (1871–1875) and State Assembly (1864 & 1865), representing Iowa County.

== Biography ==
Little was born in County Fermanagh, Ireland (in what is now Northern Ireland) on February 23, 1822. He received a common school education in Ireland and emigrated to the United States in 1842, staying for a year at the home of his brothers in Mercer County, Illinois.

In 1844, he moved north into the Wisconsin Territory and settled at New Diggings, where he worked in the smelting shop of Stole & Leakley for four years. He then used his earnings to purchase a half-stake in a new general merchandise business with Leakley. After four years of that business, he parlayed his earnings to purchase 320 acres of land in what is now the town of Linden, including the historic site of Fort Washington, which had been utilized in the Black Hawk War. He went on to serve at least four terms as chairman of the town board of supervisors (1858–1862). (Records before 1858 are incomplete.)

He also served three years on the county board of supervisors and six years as county superintendent of the poor. Politically, he was a stalwart Republican and was elected to two consecutive terms in the Wisconsin State Assembly from Iowa County's southern district, serving in the 1864 and 1865 sessions. He was elected in 1870 to represent all of Iowa County in the Wisconsin State Senate, and was subsequently re-elected in 1872.

He was active in the Iowa County Agricultural Society, and served as a vice president of the organization in 1863. He was also involved with the Southwestern Wisconsin Industrial Association, serving on the board of that organization in 1879.

Little died on January 6, 1890, at his home in Linden, Wisconsin, and was buried in Mineral Point, Wisconsin.

== Personal life and family ==
In 1851, Little married English American immigrant Susana Fawcett. They had ten children together, though three died in childhood.

== Electoral history ==
=== Wisconsin Senate (1870) ===
Wisconsin Senate, 15th District Election, 1870
| Party | Candidate | Votes | % | ±% |
|---|---|---|---|---|
General Election, November 8, 1870
| Republican | Francis Little | 1,865 | 50.76% | |
| Democratic | Benjamin Evans | 1,809 | 49.24% | |
| Plurality | | 56 | 1.52% | |
| Total votes | | 3,674 | 100.0% | |
| Republican hold | | | | |

=== Wisconsin Senate (1872) ===
Wisconsin Senate, 9th District Election, 1872
| Party | Candidate | Votes | % | ±% |
|---|---|---|---|---|
General Election, November 5, 1872
| Republican | Francis Little (incumbent) | 2,116 | 51.37% | −13.01% |
| Democratic | Henry C. Barnard | 2,003 | 48.63% | |
| Plurality | | 113 | 2.74% | -26.02% |
| Total votes | | 4,119 | 100.0% | -22.91% |
| Republican hold | | | | |

== See also ==
- Francis Little at Find a Grave

Wisconsin State Assembly
| Preceded by John H. Vivian | Member of the Wisconsin State Assembly from the Iowa 2nd district January 4, 1864 – January 1, 1866 | Succeeded by James Spensley |
Wisconsin Senate
| Preceded by Lemuel W. Joiner | Member of the Wisconsin Senate from the 15th district January 2, 1871 – January 1, 1872 | Succeeded by Carl H. Schmidt |
| Preceded by Eliphalet S. Miner | Member of the Wisconsin Senate from the 9th district January 1, 1872 – January 4, 1875 | Succeeded by David McFarland |
