= Shields, Wisconsin =

Shields is the name of some places in the U.S. state of Wisconsin:

- Shields, Dodge County, Wisconsin, a town
- Shields, Marquette County, Wisconsin, a town
