= Manitowoc =

Manitowoc may refer to:

- Manitowoc, Wisconsin, county seat of Manitowoc County
- Manitowoc County, Wisconsin
- Manitowoc (town), Wisconsin a town mostly annexed by the city of Manitowoc
- Manitowoc River, a river in Wisconsin
- Manitowoc Rapids, Wisconsin a town named after rapids along the Manitowoc River
- The Manitowoc Company, heavy equipment manufacturers

== See also ==
- Manitou
