= Ferdinand T. Yahr =

American politician (1834–1910)

Member of the Wisconsin Senate from the 9th district
- In office 1891–1894
- Preceded by: George Fitch
- Succeeded by: Clarence V. Peirce

Personal details
- Born: Ferdinand Theodore Yahr; December 17, 1834 Heldrungen, Germany
- Died: May 1, 1910 (aged 75) Milwaukee, Wisconsin, U.S.
- Party: Democratic
- Spouse: Amelia C. Schaal (m. 1861)
- Children: 10
- Occupation: Politician

Ferdinand Theodore Yahr (December 17, 1834 – May 1, 1910) was a member of the Wisconsin State Senate.

== Biography ==
Yahr was born on December 17, 1834, in Heldrungen, Germany. He came to Wisconsin in 1849, where he lived in Watertown, Berlin, Waupun and Princeton, Wisconsin. In 1861, he married Amelia C. Schaal. They had ten children. Yahr died on May 1, 1910, in Milwaukee, Wisconsin and was buried at Forest Home Cemetery.

== Career ==
Yahr defeated James O. Raymond (1831–1897) in the 1890 senatorial election and served as a member of the Wisconsin State Senate from 1891 to 1893, representing the 9th District. He was also an elector for the 1892 presidential election. Yahr was a Democrat.
