= Herman C. Wipperman =

American politician (1853–1939)

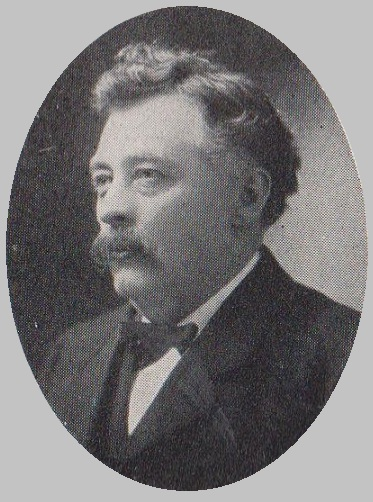

Member of the Wisconsin Senate from the 9th district
- In office 1903–1906
- Preceded by: Thomas Fearne
- Succeeded by: Theodore W. Brazeau

Member of the Wisconsin State Assembly
- In office 1895–1903

Personal details
- Born: July 28, 1853 Mosel, Wisconsin, U.S.
- Died: July 3, 1939 (aged 85) Chicago, Illinois, U.S.
- Party: Republican
- Children: 3
- Education: University of Wisconsin Law School
- Occupation: Politician

Herman C. Wipperman (July 28, 1853 – July 3, 1939) was an American politician. He was a member of the Wisconsin State Assembly and Wisconsin State Senate.

== Early life and education ==
Herman C. Wipperman was born in Mosel, Wisconsin, on July 28, 1853. He moved to Chilton, Wisconsin, in 1873. After studying carpentry, he and his brother operated a furniture business in Chilton until 1886. In 1889, he graduated from the University of Wisconsin Law School.

== Career ==
After graduating from the University of Wisconsin, Wipperman practiced law in Chilton until August 1891. Then, he moved to Grand Rapids, Wisconsin. After moving to Grand Rapids, he practiced law with B. R. Goggins. He served as the City Attorney of Grand Rapids from 1893 to 1895. Wipperman then served two terms as Mayor of Grand Rapids from 1896 to April 1900. He ran the city as it was merging with Centralia and Grand Rapids were joined. He turned over the management of Grand Rapids to his former associate, B.R. Goggins, the mayor for the new city, Wisconsin Rapids.

He was a member of the Assembly from 1895 to 1898 before serving as District Attorney of Wood County, Wisconsin, from 1901 to 1902. Later, he was a member of the Senate from 1903 to 1906. He was a Republican.

In 1904, Wipperman proposed moving Wisconsin's capital from Madison to Grand Rapids after a fire at the Wisconsin State Capitol on February 26, 1904. Despite support from local newspapers, the proposal ultimately got buried in committee.

Shortly after 1906, Wipperman moved to Muscogee, Oklahoma.

== Personal life ==
Wipperman had two sons and one daughter: E. C. Wipperman, Richard O. Wipperman, and Mrs. Goodell.

== Death ==
Wipperman died on July 3, 1939, at his daughter's house in Chicago. He is buried in Rothmann Cemetery in Calumet County, Wisconsin.
