= Clarence V. Peirce =

American politician (1850–1923)

Clarence E. Peirce

Member of the Wisconsin Senate from the 9th district
- In office 1895–1898
- Preceded by: Ferdinand T. Yahr
- Succeeded by: Thomas Fearne

Member of the Wisconsin State Assembly
- In office 1891–1895

Personal details
- Born: December 25, 1850 Germania, Marquette County, Wisconsin, U.S.
- Died: December 2, 1923 (aged 72) Eau Claire, Wisconsin, U.S.
- Party: Republican

Clarence Eugene Peirce (December 25, 1850 – December 2, 1923) was an American politician.

Born in the community of Germania, Marquette County, Wisconsin, Peirce went to the public schools and to business college in London, Ontario, Canada. He was in the mercantile business. He was also in the milling business. Peirce was also a livestock dealer and a dairy farmer. He was involved with the Westfield State Bank in Westfield, Wisconsin and the state bank in Wilsonville, Nebraska. Peirce served on the local draft board during World War I. From 1891 to 1895, Peirce served in the Wisconsin State Assembly and was a Republican. He then served in the Wisconsin State Senate from 1895 to 1899. Peirce died from a stroke at his home, in Eau Claire, Wisconsin.
