= B. R. Goggins =

American lawyer and politician (1858–1937)

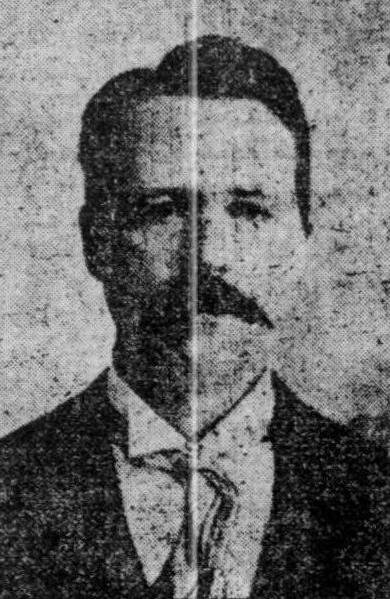
- Goggins in a 1907 newspaper

Personal details
- Born: Bernard R. Goggins; June 17, 1858 New Holstein, Wisconsin, U.S.
- Died: September 2, 1937 (aged 79) Wisconsin Rapids, Wisconsin, U.S.
- Resting place: Forest Hill Cemetery
- Party: Democratic
- Spouse: Elizabeth Hooten (m. 1886)
- Children: 6
- Education: Oshkosh teachers' college; University of Wisconsin Law School
- Occupation: Lawyer; politician

Bernard R. Goggins (June 17, 1858 – September 2, 1937) was an American lawyer and the first mayor of Wisconsin Rapids, Wisconsin.

== Early life ==
Bernard R. Goggins was born on June 17, 1858, in New Holstein, Wisconsin, to Bridget and Hugh Goggins. In 1864, the family moved to Charlestown, Wisconsin. Goggins attended Chilton High School and later graduated from Oshkosh teachers' college (now University of Wisconsin–Oshkosh) in 1884. He earned a law degree from the University of Wisconsin Law School in 1890. In December 1899, he got admitted to the State Bar of Wisconsin.

== Career ==
In November 1884, Goggins came to Grand Rapids, Wisconsin. After Oshkosh, he became principal at Howe High School in Grand Rapids from November 1884 to June 1888. After graduating from law school, he became partners with Herman C. Wipperman in Centralia. He first opened a law office west of the Wisconsin River and then opened an office in Centralia.

In 1892, he was elected as district attorney of Wood County, Wisconsin, but lost re-election in 1894. One of Goggin's students at Howe High School, Theodore W. Brazeau, joined with Goggins to form the law firm Goggins & Brazeau on June 27, 1900. On August 1, 1923, R. B. Graves joined and the firm became Goggins, Brazeau, & Graves. He left the firm in April 1, 1937. After his death, the firm became Brazeau & Graves. He was a Democrat.

In April 1900, he became the first mayor of Wisconsin Rapids, Wisconsin, which had just been consolidated from Grand Rapids and Centralia. He served one term.

In 1910, Goggins worked on a board of appraisers to appraise Eau Claire Water Works in Eau Claire, Wisconsin. During World War I, Goggins prosecuted alleged violators of the Espionage Act of 1917. On March 1, 1918, he was appointed by Thomas Watt Gregory as the special assistant to the U.S. attorney general for the western district of Wisconsin to prosecute violators of the Act. Under federal judges A. L. Sanborn of Madison and Evan E. Evans of Chicago, he prosecuted espionage cases, including Judge John M. Becker of Monroe and Louis B. Nagler, former Wisconsin assistant secretary of state. He held this role until November 1, 1919. He also tried the United States's case against Ada Griffith for the White Slave Traffic Act, which reached the U.S. Supreme Court. He defended the constitutionality of the Husting Power Water Act, dealing with the title of water powers in the state, in the state supreme court.

He also served as a member of the Wood County Board and Centralia School Board. He was a Democratic candidate for Wisconsin State Senate and was offered an appointment by Governor James O. Davidson to the Railroad Commission of Wisconsin, but declined.

He served as president of the Wisconsin State Bar Association from June 1916 to June 1917.

== Personal life ==
Goggins married Elizabeth A. Hooten of Clemonsville, Winnebago County, Wisconsin, on August 11, 1886. Together, they had six children, including Hugh W. Goggins, William A. Goggins and Robert S. Goggins. Goggins's son, Hugh W. Goggins, also worked in his father's law firm and served as district attorney of Wood County.

== Death ==
Goggins died on September 2, 1937, at his home in Wisconsin Rapids. He was cremated and buried at Forest Hill Cemetery.
