= Thomas Fearne =

American politician (1846–1901)

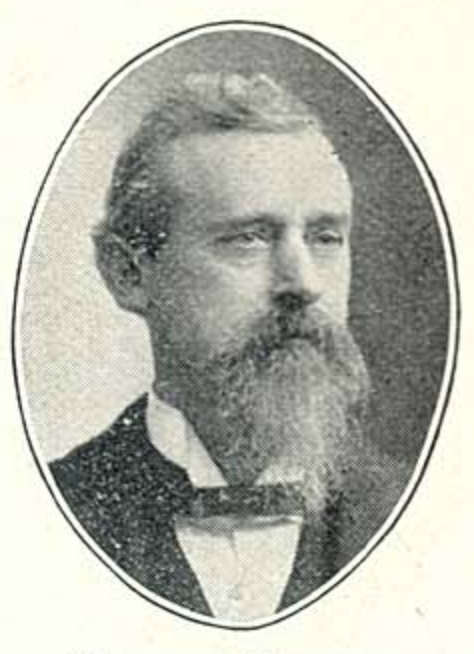
- Photograph of Fearne

Member of the Wisconsin Senate from the 9th district
- In office January 2, 1899 – April 29, 1901 (death)
- Preceded by: Clarence V. Peirce
- Succeeded by: Herman C. Wipperman

Sheriff of Waushara County, Wisconsin
- In office January 1, 1883 – January 1, 1885
- Preceded by: I. P. Coon
- Succeeded by: Cornelius A. Davenport

Personal details
- Born: November 14, 1846 Hamilton, Canada West
- Died: April 29, 1901 (aged 54) Coloma, Wisconsin, U.S.
- Party: Republican
- Occupation: Politician, farmer

Thomas Fearne (November 14, 1846 – April 29, 1901) was a British North America-born American farmer, and Republican politician. He was a member of the Wisconsin State Senate, representing the 9th Senate district from January 1899 until his death in April 1901. He also served one term as sheriff of Waushara County, Wisconsin.

== Early life ==
Thomas Fearne was born on November 14, 1846, in Hamilton, Canada West, Fearne was educated in the public schools. In 1855, he emigrated to the United States and settled in the town of Richfield, Adams County, Wisconsin. In 1864, Fearne moved permanently to Coloma, Waushara County, Wisconsin.

== Career ==
Fearne was a farmer who served as chairman of the Coloma Town Board for eighteen years. In 1883 and 1884, Fearne served as sheriff of Waushara County and was a Republican. He served as the clerk of Coloma in 1891 and 1892. From 1899 until his death in 1901, Fearne served in the Wisconsin State Senate, representing district 9.

== Death ==
Fearne died suddenly on April 29, 1901, at his home in Coloma, Wisconsin of quinsy. He had returned home from attending the legislative session in Madison, Wisconsin, and had felt ill.

== Notes ==
Wisconsin Senate
Preceded by Clarence V. Peirce	Member of the Wisconsin Senate from the 9th district January 2, 1899 – April 29, 1901 (death)	Succeeded by Herman C. Wipperman
Legal offices
Preceded by I. P. Coon	Sheriff of Waushara County, Wisconsin; January 1, 1883 – January 1, 1885	Succeeded by Cornelius A. Davenport
