= Hobart Sterling Sacket =

19th century American politician

Hobart S. Sacket

Member of the Wisconsin Senate from the 9th district
- In office January 1, 1877 – January 3, 1881
- Preceded by: David McFarland
- Succeeded by: James F. Wiley

Member of the Wisconsin State Assembly from the Waushara district
- In office January 1, 1872 – January 6, 1873
- Preceded by: Edwin Montgomery
- Succeeded by: Sherman Bardwell

Personal details
- Born: February 14, 1844 Sackets Harbor, New York, U.S.
- Died: March 11, 1911 (aged 67) Berlin, Wisconsin, U.S.
- Resting place: Oakwood Cemetery, Berlin, Wisconsin
- Party: Republican
- Spouse: Martha Ann Farley (m. 1867–1911)
- Children: Rodney Sacket^{(b. 1868; died 1938)}; Louise (Smith)^{(b. 1874; died 1949)}; Walter Hobart Sacket^{(b. 1877; died 1962)}
- Occupation: Farmer

Military service
- Allegiance: United States
- Branch/service: United States Volunteers; Union Army
- Rank: Quartermaster, USV
- Battles/wars: American Civil War

Hobart Sterling Sacket (February 14, 1844 – March 11, 1911) was an American farmer and Republican politician. He served in the Wisconsin State Senate and Assembly, representing Green Lake, Marquette, and Waushara counties.

== Biography ==
Sacket was born on February 14, 1844, in Sackets Harbor, New York. He attended what is now Western Reserve Academy and then relocated to Wisconsin in 1866. He died of heart failure at his home in Berlin.

== Career ==
Sacket was a member of the Wisconsin State Assembly in 1872 before representing the 9th District in the Wisconsin State Senate from 1877 through 1880. Additionally, he was chairman (similar to mayor) of Aurora, Wisconsin, and a delegate to the 1872 Republican National Convention.
