= Edmund, Wisconsin =

Census-designated place in Wisconsin, United States

- Census-designated place
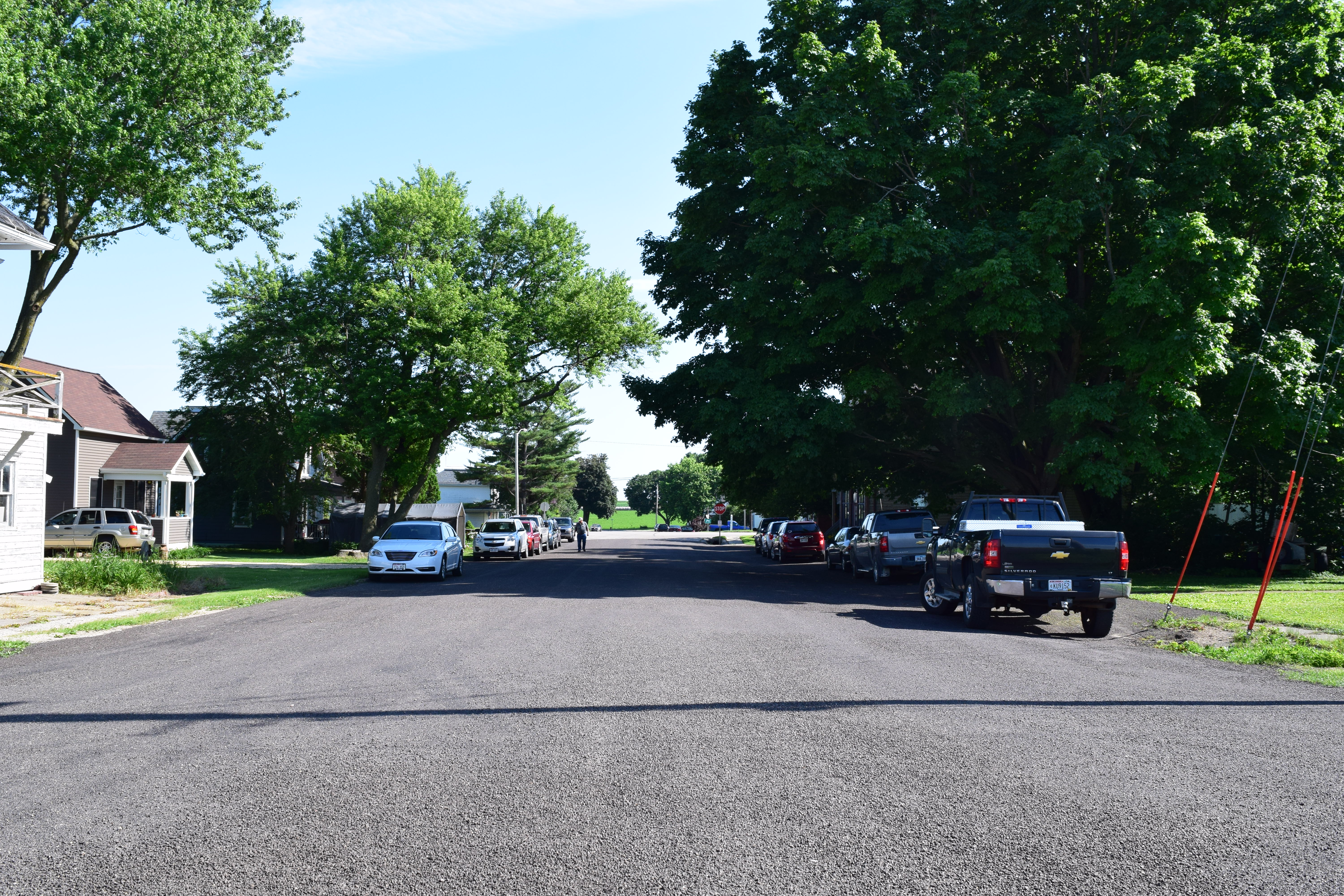
- Looking down Main Street in Edmund

- Location within Wisconsin Location within the United States
- Coordinates: 42°58′03″N 90°15′52″W
- Country: United States
- State: Wisconsin
- County: Iowa
- Town: Linden

Area
  - Total: 0.342 sq mi (0.89 km^{2})
  - Land: 0.342 sq mi (0.89 km^{2})
  - Water: 0 sq mi (0 km^{2})
- Elevation: 1,204 ft (367 m)

Population (2020)
  - Total: 129
  - Density: 375/sq mi (144.9/km^{2})
- Time zone: UTC-6 (Central (CST))
  - Summer (DST): UTC-5 (CDT)
- Area code: 608
- GNIS feature ID: 1564455

Edmund is a census-designated place (CDP) in the Town of Linden in Iowa County, Wisconsin, United States. As of the 2020 census, Edmund had a population of 129.

== Description ==
The CDP is located on U.S. Route 18 west of Dodgeville. The community's post office closed on November 2, 2002. At the 2020 census, Edmund's population was 129.

== History ==
Edmund got its name in 1881 from Edmund V. Baker who owned the land where the settlement was located.

== Demographics ==
=== 2020 Census ===
As of the 2020 census there were 129 people, 58 housing units and 80 households residing in the CDP. The population density was 377.2 inhabitants per square mile (144.9/km^{2}). The average housing unit density was 169.6 per square mile (65.2/km^{2}). The racial makeup of the CDP was 99.22% White, 0.00% African American, 0.00% Native American, 0.00% Asian, 0.00% Pacific Islander, 0.00% from other races, and 0.78% from two or more races. Hispanic or Latino of any race was 0.00% of the population.

Of the family households, 40.0% were married couples, 22.5% were a male householder with no spouse, and 32.5% were a female householder with no spouse. The average family household had 2.36 people.

The median age was 39.5, 14.5% of people were under the age of 18, and 13.3% were 65 years of age or older. Of the residents, 48.0% had German ancestry, none spoke a language other than English at home, and none were born outside the United States.

The median income for a household in the CDP was $51,667, and the median income for a family was $51,578. 6.1% of the population were military veterans, and 6.6% had a batchelors degree or higher. In the CDP 18.5% of the population was below the poverty line, including 48.0% of those under age 18 and 56.5% of those age 65 or over, with 16.2% of the population without health insurance.

=== 2010 Census ===
At the 2010 census, Edmund's population was 173.

== See also ==
- List of census-designated places in Wisconsin
