= Germania, Marquette County, Wisconsin =

Germania, Wisconsin
- Unincorporated community
- Location within Wisconsin Location within the United States
- Coordinates: 43°53′26″N 89°15′25″W
- Country: United States
- State: Wisconsin
- County: Marquette
- Elevation: 791 ft (241 m)
- Time zone: UTC-6 (Central (CST))
  - Summer (DST): UTC-5 (CDT)
- Postal code: 54960
- Area code: 920
- GNIS feature ID: 1565491

Germania is an unincorporated community located in the town of Shields, Marquette County, Wisconsin, United States.

== History ==
The land which would become Germania was ceded by the indigenous Menominee to the American government in 1848, and it was opened for settlement in 1849.

The Germania Colony was founded in 1860 by followers of Benjamin Hall, a Massachusetts businessman and preacher inspired by William Miller's teachings. Hall, from Groton, Massachusetts, had left the Groton Congregational Church due to his abolitionist views in 1839. In the 1840s, a group of Millerites under Hall's leadership, who called themselves "The Community", founded a commune in Groton and prepared for the Second Coming. Nearby to The Community in Groton were several other similar communes: Fruitlands, Brook Farm, and Hopedale, as well as Shakers. Following the Great Disappointment in 1844, Hall's followers continued to believe in the imminent return of Jesus; they lived communally and advocated against slavery and exploitation of workers. In 1857, Hall married Henrietta Peirce, a prominent member of The Community who owned land in Germania. Desiring physical separation from society, they migrated west and established a new commune on Peirce's land.

Benjamin Hall bought more land in Germania and established the "Germania Company", which came to be called "The Colony". The Community built a large central building (the "Big House") for worship and to house unmarried community members, as well as a school, roads, and farmsteads. They worshipped together daily, but did not seek new members or align with any other Christian group. A more formal church was built in 1875, probably served by an itinerant preacher. Hall died in 1879, and the commune declined, but existed into the 1890s.

== Notable people ==
- Clarence V. Peirce, state senator and dairy farmer, was the son of Henrietta Peirce Hall and was raised in The Community
