= James Franklin Wiley =

American politician

Member of the Wisconsin Senate from the 9th district
- In office 1881–1886
- Preceded by: Hobart S. Sacket
- Succeeded by: George Fitch

Personal details
- Born: May 17, 1832 Gouverneur, New York, U.S.
- Died: January 12, 1902 (aged 69)
- Party: Republican
- Occupation: Politician

James Franklin Wiley (May 17, 1832 – January 12, 1902), was a member of the Wisconsin State Senate.

== Biography ==
Wiley was born on May 17, 1832, in Gouverneur, New York. He died on January 12, 1902, and was buried in Hancock, Wisconsin.

== Career ==
Wiley represented the 9th District in the Senate. Other positions he held include Postmaster of Hancock. He was a Republican.
