= Theodore W. Brazeau =

American politician (1873–1965)

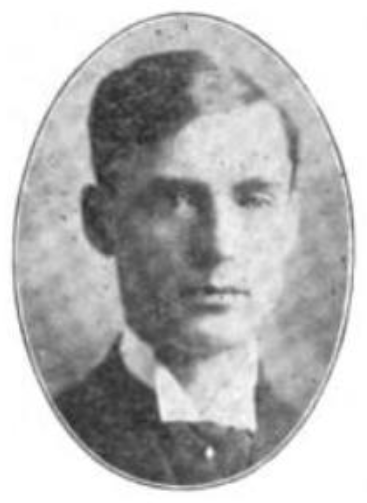

Member of the Wisconsin Senate from the 9th district
- In office 1907–1910
- Preceded by: Herman C. Wipperman
- Succeeded by: Edward F. Kileen

Personal details
- Born: March 12, 1873 Grand Rapids, Wisconsin, U.S.
- Died: October 12, 1965 (aged 92) Grand Rapids, Wisconsin, U.S.
- Resting place: Forest Hill Cemetery; Madison, Wisconsin, U.S.
- Party: Republican
- Spouse: Harriet Pickett (m. 1904; died 1961)
- Children: 2
- Education: University of Wisconsin-Madison; University of Wisconsin Law School
- Occupation: Lawyer; politician

Theodore W. Brazeau (March 12, 1873 – October 12, 1965) was an American lawyer and member of the Wisconsin State Senate from 1907 to 1910.

== Early life ==
Theodore W. Brazeau was born on March 12, 1873, in Grand Rapids (then Wisconsin Rapids), Wisconsin to Stephen (Etienne) D. Brazeau, a barber. Brazeau graduated from Howe High School in Grand Rapids. He graduated from the University of Wisconsin with a bachelor's degree in 1897 and the University of Wisconsin Law School in 1900.

Brazeau was known as "T.W."

== Career ==
Brazeau taught during his time at the University of Wisconsin. After graduating, he practiced law in Grand Rapids with B. R. Goggins under the firm name of Goggins & Brazeau until 1907, then he practiced law under Goggins, Brazeau, & Briere. He was District Attorney of Wood County, Wisconsin from 1903 to 1907.

Brazeau was elected to the Wisconsin State Senate in 1906, and represented the 9th District from 1907 to 1910. He was a Republican. In 1909, Brazeau led the enactment of the nation's first Workmen's Compensation Law. It was adopted in 1911, after his tenure, but was the first law of its kind to be declared constitutional. In August 1961, Brazeau and Supreme Court Justice Edward T. Fairchild were honored guests at the 50th anniversary of the law. President John F. Kennedy was the principal speaker. In 1923, Brazeau received national attention as special prosecutor in the John Magnuson murder case. Magnuson was convicted of first-degree murder using scientific circumstantial evidence for sending a bomb through the mail.

After the Senate, Brazeau continued with his law practice. In 1950, the partnership at Goggins, Brazeau, & Briere ended and he started a new practice with his son, Richard. He continued his law practice until retiring in 1964. He also served on the Wisconsin Rapids School Board for 16 years and was a member of the county board for four years.

== Personal life ==
Brazeau married Harriet Pickett in Marshfield on August 31, 1904. She died on February 2, 1961. Together, they had two sons, Bernard and Richard.

== Death ==
Brazeau died at his home in Grand Rapids on October 12, 1965. He was buried at Forest Hill Cemetery.
