= Eliphalet S. Miner =

American politician merchant and politician from Wisconsin (1818–1890)

E. S. Miner

Member of the Wisconsin Senate
- In office January 1, 1872 – January 6, 1873
- Preceded by: Waldo Flint
- Succeeded by: Thomas B. Scott
- Constituency: 29th district
- In office January 2, 1871 – January 1, 1872
- Preceded by: William J. Kershaw
- Succeeded by: Francis Little
- Constituency: 9th district

Member of the Wisconsin State Assembly from the Juneau district
- In office January 2, 1865 – January 7, 1867
- Preceded by: Lyman Clark
- Succeeded by: Ezra C. Sage

County Judge of Adams County, Wisconsin
- In office April 1848 – January 5, 1863
- Preceded by: Position established
- Succeeded by: Solon W. Pierce

Personal details
- Born: March 20, 1818 Madison, New York, U.S.
- Died: February 9, 1890 (aged 71) Necedah, Wisconsin, U.S.
- Resting place: Bayview Cemetery, Necedah, Wisconsin
- Party: Republican; Union (1863–1867)
- Spouse: Serena Elliott (m. 1845–1890)
- Children: Edward, Ella, Frances, Julius, Mary, John

Eliphalet Steele Miner (March 20, 1818 – February 9, 1890) was an American merchant, Republican politician, and Wisconsin pioneer. He was the first American settler at Necedah, Wisconsin, and represented Juneau County for four years in the Wisconsin Legislature. He was also the first county judge of Adams County, Wisconsin, despite not having a legal background. In historical documents, his name is frequently abbreviated as E. S. Miner.

== Early life ==
Miner was born on March 20, 1818, in Madison, New York. At age 10, he came west with his family to Green Bay, which was then part of the Michigan Territory. His father was a Presbyterian missionary, preaching to the Stockbridge Indians. Just a few months after their arrival, before their home had been finished, the family was stricken with Dysentery, which killed Miner's father and infant sister. Eliphalet and his siblings were also sick at the time, and his mother brought the children back to New York, where they remained until 1834.

== Wisconsin pioneer ==
In 1834, he returned to the west, laboring on a farm in Illinois until 1841, when he returned to the Wisconsin Territory with his earnings. That year, he was an early settler at what is now Grand Rapids, Wisconsin—he opened a general store there with merchandise from Illinois. His store quickly also became the local post office, and in 1843 he was the first appointed postmaster at Grand Rapids. He was also elected to the Portage County board of supervisors—Portage County at that time stretched all the way from the major bend in the Wisconsin River all the way to the northern border of the Wisconsin Territory.

During these years, he also married and began a family.

In 1847, Governor Henry Dodge appointed him public administrator for Portage County, and the Territorial Assembly authorized him and an associate to build dams along the Wisconsin River in the vicinity of Grand Rapids to improve the navigability, and to collect tolls from cargo rafts floating through their improvements. In 1848, Miner went into business with John T. Kingston and others in the firm T. Weston & Co., to profit from lumber transportation on the Wisconsin River and its Yellow River tributary. The firm operated successfully and Miner remained a stockholder through at least 1881, when it became the Necedah Lumbering Company.

In the Spring of 1848, during the last session of the Wisconsin Territory government before statehood, the Assembly created Adams County from the southwest corner of Portage County. At the first election of this new county, held in April 1848, Eliphalet Miner was elected county judge. Despite having no legal education, he was re-elected several times and held the office through 1862.

While serving as judge, he relocated to Necedah, Wisconsin, in May 1850. Necedah became part of Juneau County when it was created in 1857, but the new county remained attached to Adams County for judicial purposes for several years after. Miner and his family were the first known settlers at Necedah. In Necedah, he maintained a store and was appointed the first postmaster there when the mail route was extended to that place. Necedah was organized as a town in 1853, at which point Miner was chosen as town treasurer and justice of the peace.

== Political career ==
During the 1860s, Miner was associated with the National Union Party—the branding of the Republican Party during the American Civil War. On the Union ticket, he was elected to two terms (1865, 1866) in the Wisconsin State Assembly, representing Juneau County. In 1870, he was elected on the Republican ticket to the Wisconsin State Senate to represent the 9th State Senate district. Redistricting occurred in the 1871 session, and, as a result of the map changes, Miner became the representative of the 29th State Senate district for the 1872 session. During the 1871 session, he was one of a number of legislators appointed to a special committee to investigate the state penal and charitable institutions.

In 1871, three-term Republican Governor Lucius Fairchild did not intend to run for a fourth term. Miner was a candidate for the Republican nomination for Governor that year, but received only minor support at the Republican state convention, with most of the delegates split between the eventual winner, Civil War general Cadwallader C. Washburn, and William E. Smith, the former State Treasurer.

Miner did not run for re-election to the Senate in 1872. He continued to serve as postmaster at Necedah until December 1885.

== Personal life and family ==
Miner was the eldest child of the Presbyterian missionary Reverend Jesse Miner and his wife Amanda (née Head). In November 1845, Eliphalet married Serena Elliott, an immigrant from Upper Canada. They had at least six children together.

Miner died on February 9, 1890, after suffering heart failure.

== Electoral history ==
=== Wisconsin Senate (1870) ===
Wisconsin Senate, 9th District Election, 1870
Party	Candidate	Votes	%	±%
General Election, November 8, 1870
Republican	Eliphalet S. Miner	3,440	64.38%	
Democratic	V. E. Smith	1,903	35.62%	
Plurality		1,537	28.77%	
Total votes		5,343	100.0%	
Republican hold				

Wisconsin State Assembly
Preceded by Lyman Clark	Member of the Wisconsin State Assembly from the Juneau district January 2, 1865 – January 7, 1867	Succeeded by Ezra C. Sage
Wisconsin Senate
Preceded by William J. Kershaw	Member of the Wisconsin Senate from the 9th district January 2, 1871 – January 1, 1872	Succeeded by Francis Little
Preceded by Waldo Flint	Member of the Wisconsin Senate from the 29th district January 1, 1872 – January 6, 1873	Succeeded by Thomas B. Scott
Legal offices
New county government	County Judge of Adams County, Wisconsin; April 1848 – January 5, 1863	Succeeded by Solon W. Pierce
