= David McFarland (politician) =

American politician

Member of the Wisconsin Senate from the 9th district
- In office January 4, 1875 – January 1, 1877
- Preceded by: Francis Little
- Succeeded by: Hobart S. Sacket

Member of the Wisconsin State Assembly from the Iowa 1st district
- In office January 5, 1863 – January 4, 1864
- Preceded by: Robert Wilson
- Succeeded by: Wyman Lincoln

Personal details
- Born: June 7, 1822 Bovina, New York, U.S.
- Died: April 25, 1902 (aged 79) Mora, Minnesota, U.S.
- Resting place: West Bend Cemetery, West Bend, Iowa
- Party: Reformer (1870s); Natl. Union (1860s)
- Spouse: Eliza Johnston (m. 1847; died 1898)
- Children: Margaret Jane McFarland^{(b. 1848; died 1925)}; Robert McFarland^{(b. 1851; died 1920)}; Andrew McFarland^{(b. 1853; died 1931)}; James Harrison McFarland^{(b. 1857; died 1935)}
- Education: Delaware Academy
- Occupation: Farmer

David McFarland (June 7, 1822 – April 25, 1902) was an American farmer, politician, and Wisconsin pioneer. He served in the Wisconsin State Senate and Assembly, representing Iowa County.

== Early life and education ==
McFarland was born on June 7, 1822, in Bovina, New York. He attended Delaware Academy in Delhi, New York. He moved to the Wisconsin Territory in 1846 and established a farm in the town of Highland, in Iowa County.

== Career ==
McFarland was appointed to the Iowa County Board of Supervisors in 1862. Later that year was elected to the Wisconsin State Assembly on the National Union ticket, representing the northern half of Iowa County. He served many years as justice of the peace, town chairman, town assessor, and school superintendent of Highland. He also served as "fund commissioner" for the county in 1873 to settle a railroad indebtedness issue for Iowa County. He was elected to the Wisconsin State Senate in 1874, running on the Reform platform—a short-lived coalition of Democrats, Liberal Republicans, and Grangers. He was not a candidate for re-election in 1876.

McFarland and his family moved to West Bend, Iowa, in 1883, and then moved to Mora, Minnesota, in 1896. McFarland died at his home in Mora on April 25, 1902. He was buried with his wife in West Bend, Iowa.

== Personal life and family ==
McFarland married Eliza Johnston on August 8, 1847. They had at least four children together. McFarland was active in Freemasonry.

Wisconsin State Assembly
Preceded by Robert Wilson	Member of the Wisconsin State Assembly from the Iowa 1st district January 5, 1863 – January 4, 1864	Succeeded by Wyman Lincoln
Wisconsin Senate
Preceded by Francis Little	Member of the Wisconsin Senate from the 9th district January 4, 1875 – January 1, 1877	Succeeded by Hobart S. Sacket
