= George Fitch (Wisconsin politician) =

American politician

Member of the Wisconsin Senate from the 9th district
- In office 1887–1890
- Preceded by: James F. Wiley
- Succeeded by: Ferdinand T. Yahr

Personal details
- Born: November 3, 1848 Glen Falls, New York, U.S.
- Died: March 30, 1896 (aged 47) Berlin, Wisconsin, U.S.
- Resting place: Riverside Cemetery; Oshkosh, Wisconsin, U.S.
- Party: Republican
- Spouse: Helen Porter (m. 1882)
- Occupation: Politician

George Fitch (November 3, 1848 – March 30, 1896) was a member of the Wisconsin State Senate.

== Biography ==
Fitch was born on November 3, 1848, in Glens Falls, New York. He was educated in Norwalk, Connecticut, before moving to Berlin, Wisconsin, in 1871. He married Helen Porter (1858–1950) in 1882. He died of appendicitis at his home in Berlin and was buried at Riverside Cemetery in Oshkosh.

== Career ==
Fitch was elected to the Wisconsin State Senate in 1886, representing the 9th district from 1887 to 1890. In 1885, he was elected Mayor of Berlin. He was a Republican.
