= Sheboygan (town), Wisconsin =

Town of Sheboygan
- Town
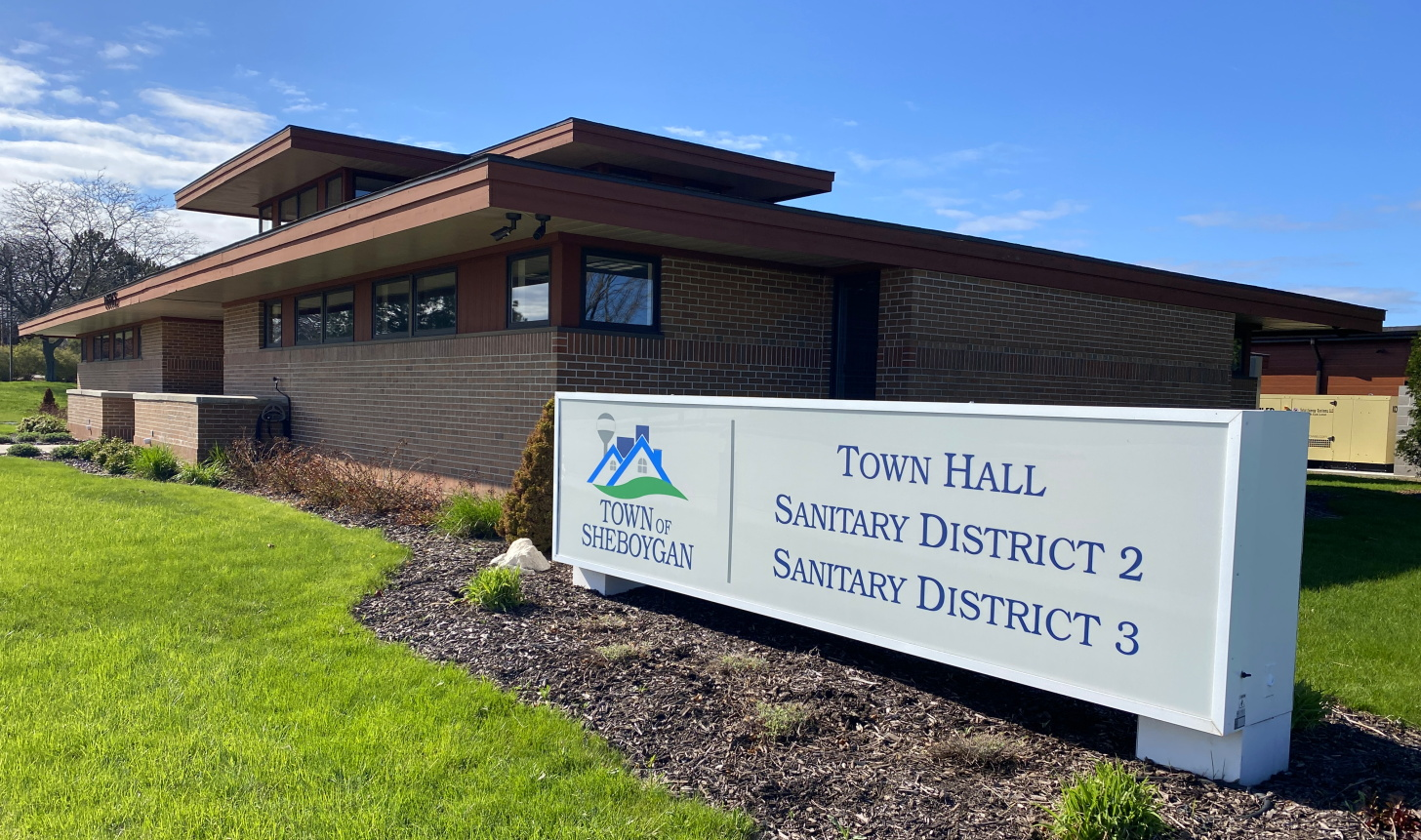
- Town Hall on North 40th Street

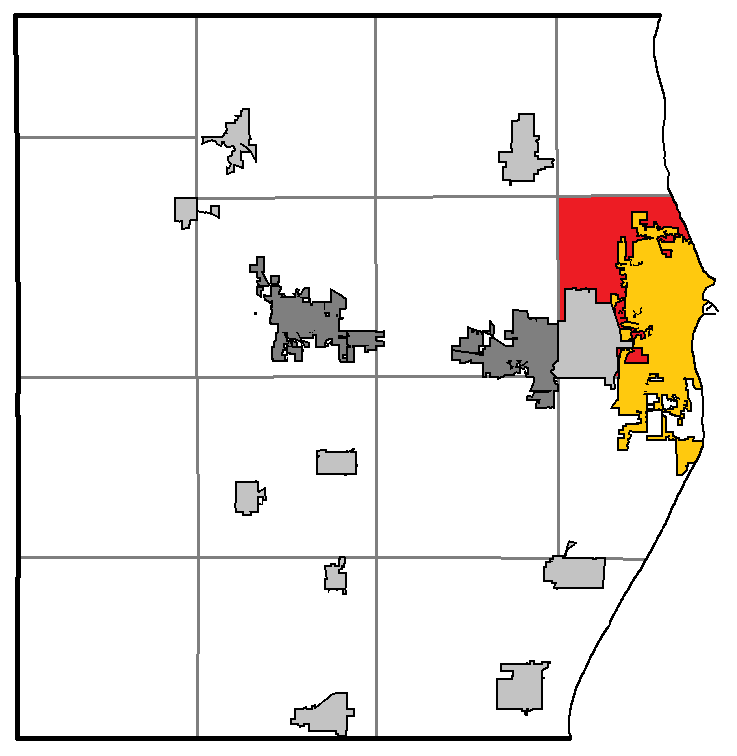
- Location of Sheboygan, within Sheboygan County
- Coordinates: 43°46′20″N 87°45′28″W
- Country: United States
- State: Wisconsin
- County: Sheboygan

Government
  - Type: Town board
  - Town Chairman: Daniel Hein

Area
  - Total: 11.0 sq mi (28.6 km^{2})
  - Land: 11.0 sq mi (28.5 km^{2})
  - Water: 0.039 sq mi (0.1 km^{2})
- Elevation: 679 ft (207 m)

Population (2020)
  - Total: 8,136
  - Density: 739/sq mi (285/km^{2})
- Time zone: UTC-6 (Central (CST))
  - Summer (DST): UTC-5 (CDT)
- Area code: 920
- FIPS code: 55-73000
- GNIS feature ID: 1584137
- Website: townofsheboyganwi.gov

Sheboygan is a town in Sheboygan County, Wisconsin, United States, known as the Town of Sheboygan to differentiate from the county and city of Sheboygan. The population was 8,136 according to the 2020 Census. It is included in the Sheboygan, Wisconsin Metropolitan Statistical Area. This separate municipality is located north and west of the city of Sheboygan, with varying boundaries along the city and village lines of Sheboygan and Kohler, including enclaves of homes connected to the town by inches-long lines of property.

The town of Sheboygan has at various times attempted to take action to acquire village status in order to fend off annexation attempts by the city, but efforts have been unsuccessful thus far.

== Geography ==
According to the United States Census Bureau, the town has a total area of 11.0 square miles (28.6 km^{2}), of which 11.0 square miles (28.5 km^{2}) is land and 0.04 square miles (0.1 km^{2}) (0.36%) is water.

== Demographics ==
Historical population
Census	Pop.	Note	%±
2000	5,874		—
2010	7,271		23.8%
2020	8,136		11.9%
U.S. Decennial Census

As of the census of 2000, there were 5,874 people, 2,148 households, and 1,724 families residing in the town. The population density was 534.5 people per square mile (206.4/km^{2}). There were 2,245 housing units at an average density of 204.3 per square mile (78.9/km^{2}). The racial makeup of the town was 96.12% White, 0.12% Black or African American, 0.15% Native American, 2.47% Asian, 0.54% from other races, and 0.60% from two or more races. 1.16% of the population were Hispanic or Latino of any race.

There were 2,148 households, out of which 38.4% had children under the age of 18 living with them, 73.9% were married couples living together, 3.8% had a female householder with no husband present, and 19.7% were non-families. 15.4% of all households were made up of individuals, and 5.0% had someone living alone who was 65 years of age or older. The average household size was 2.73 and the average family size was 3.07.

In the town, the population was spread out, with 27.8% under the age of 18, 5.3% from 18 to 24, 30.9% from 25 to 44, 26.5% from 45 to 64, and 9.5% who were 65 years of age or older. The median age was 38 years. For every 100 females, there were 104.0 males. For every 100 females age 18 and over, there were 102.0 males.

The median income for a household in the town was $60,846, and the median income for a family was $64,422. Males had a median income of $43,400 versus $27,124 for females. The per capita income for the town was $25,492. About 0.8% of families and 1.8% of the population were below the poverty line, including 1.2% of those under age 18 and 4.0% of those age 65 or over.

== Government ==
The Town of Sheboygan is served by an elected five-member town board, a chairman and four town supervisors. The town operates two Sanitary Districts. The town also employs a public works department for maintenance of town roads.

The Town of Sheboygan Volunteer Fire Department provides fire suppression operating out of a fire station on the town's west side while Orange Cross Ambulance provides emergency medical services. Law enforcement services are provided by the Sheboygan County Sheriff's Office. Part-time Code Enforcement Officers are employed to address parking and ordinance concerns.

== Education ==
The Sheboygan Area School District operates Lincoln-Erdman Elementary School and Lake Country Academy within the Town of Sheboygan.

== Economy and growth ==
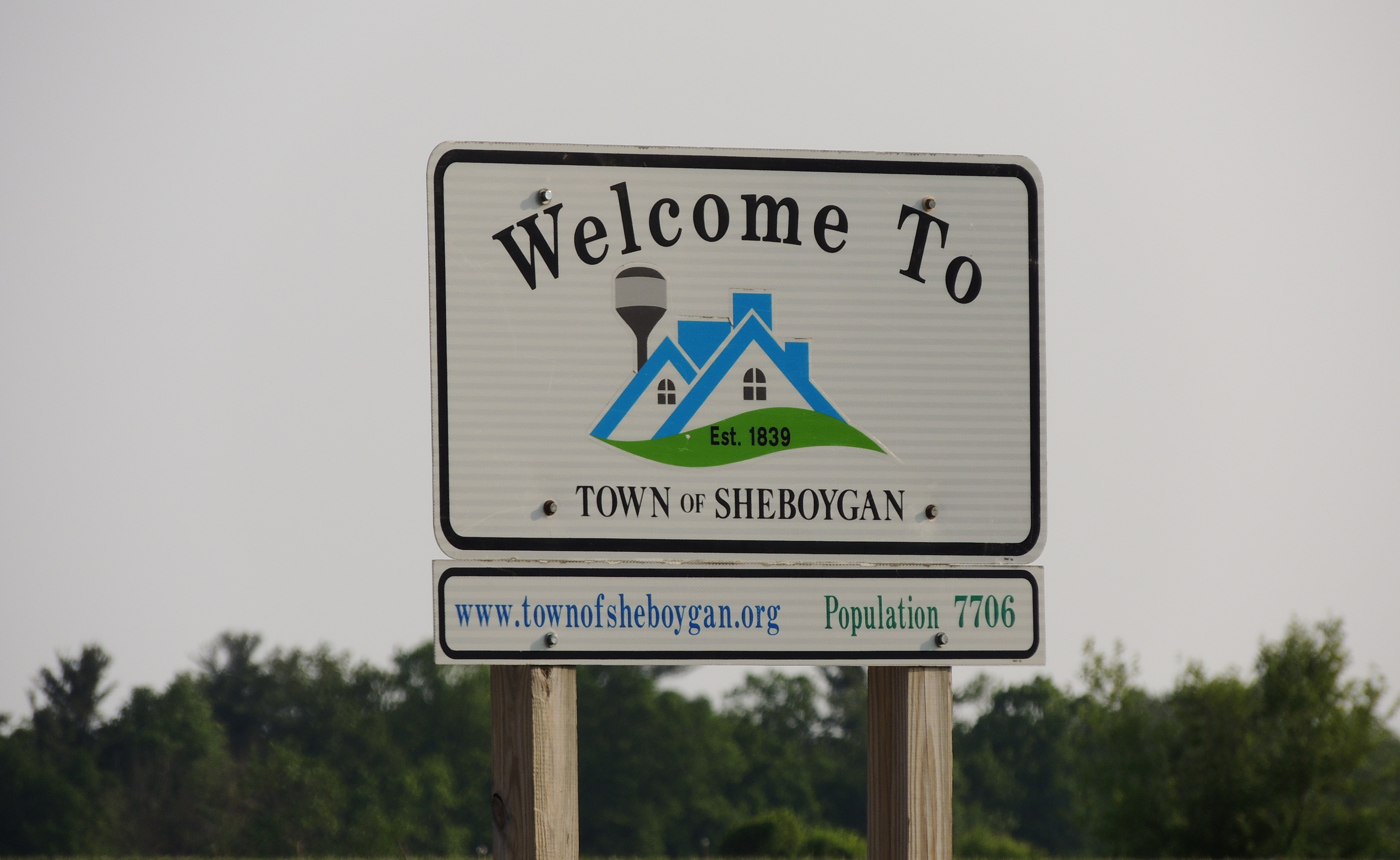

Although Sam's Club announced the building of a 137,000 square-foot store in 2014 on the former site of an older Menards store, after years of delays, Town of Sheboygan officials confirmed that the construction would not be moving forward, though Walmart continues to own the vacant land as of 2022. The Sheboygan Senior Community built a new facility on County Road Y and relocated from downtown Sheboygan in late 2015.

The town moved its town hall in December 2020 from its former cramped building at North 40th Street and Superior Avenue to an existing building in the Erdman area, as it became clear during the pandemic that it could not operate meetings or elections out of it to allow social distancing, and to address longstanding accessibility concerns.
