= Shields, Marquette County, Wisconsin =

Shields, Wisconsin
- Town
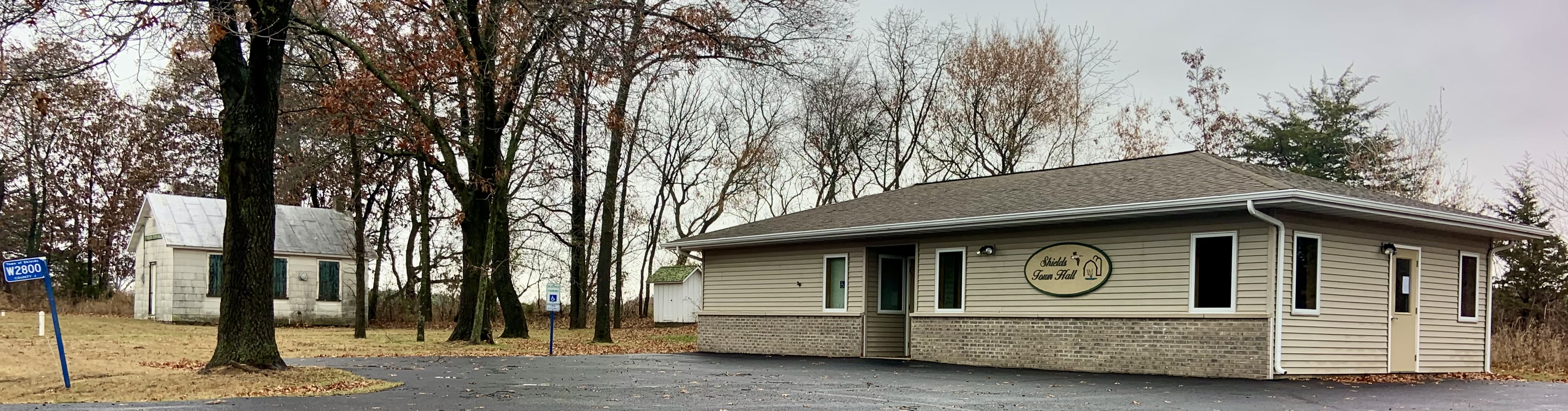
- Town hall

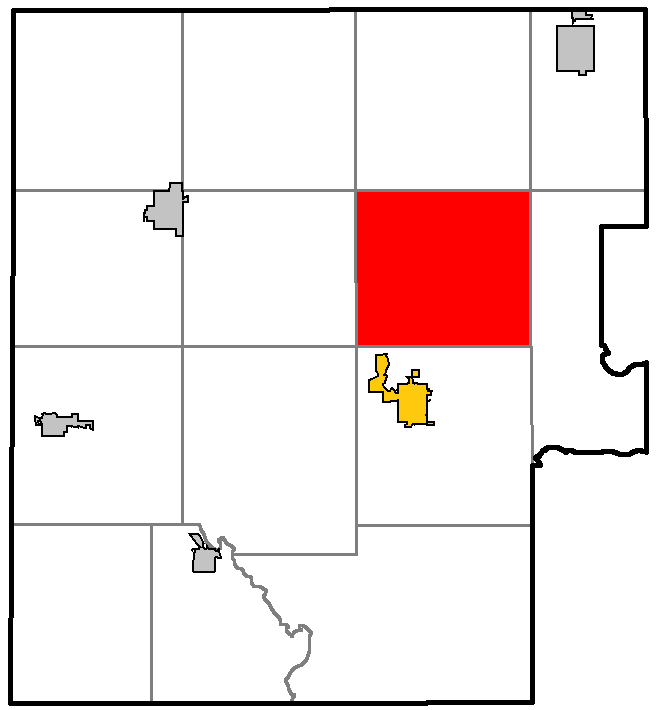
- Location of Shields, Marquette County, Wisconsin

- Location of Marquette County, Wisconsin
- Coordinates: 43°51′13″N 89°17′39″W
- Country: United States
- State: Wisconsin
- County: Marquette

Area
  - Total: 31.5 sq mi (81.5 km^{2})
  - Land: 31.2 sq mi (80.8 km^{2})
  - Water: 0.27 sq mi (0.7 km^{2})
- Elevation: 830 ft (253 m)

Population (2020)
  - Total: 585
  - Density: 18.8/sq mi (7.24/km^{2})
- Time zone: UTC-6 (Central (CST))
  - Summer (DST): UTC-5 (CDT)
- FIPS code: 55-73600
- GNIS feature ID: 1584153
- Website: https://townofshields-wi.gov/

Shields is a town in Marquette County, Wisconsin, United States. The population was 585 at the 2020 census. The unincorporated community of Germania is located in the town.

== Geography ==
According to the United States Census Bureau, the town has a total area of 31.5 square miles (81.5 km^{2}), of which 31.2 square miles (80.8 km^{2}) is land and 0.3 square mile (0.7 km^{2}) (0.83%) is water.

== Demographics ==
As of the census of 2000, there were 456 people, 194 households, and 130 families residing in the town. The population density was 14.6 people per square mile (5.6/km^{2}). There were 277 housing units at an average density of 8.9 per square mile (3.4/km^{2}). The racial makeup of the town was 99.56% White, 0.22% Native American, and 0.22% from two or more races.

There were 194 households, out of which 19.6% had children under the age of 18 living with them, 59.8% were married couples living together, 4.6% had a female householder with no husband present, and 32.5% were non-families. 25.3% of all households were made up of individuals, and 9.3% had someone living alone who was 65 years of age or older. The average household size was 2.35 and the average family size was 2.74.

In the town, the population was spread out, with 20.2% under the age of 18, 6.6% from 18 to 24, 22.8% from 25 to 44, 28.3% from 45 to 64, and 22.1% who were 65 years of age or older. The median age was 45 years. For every 100 females, there were 110.1 males. For every 100 females age 18 and over, there were 112.9 males.

The median income for a household in the town was $32,250, and the median income for a family was $36,319. Males had a median income of $25,278 versus $22,143 for females. The per capita income for the town was $17,218. About 4.6% of families and 9.3% of the population were below the poverty line, including 6.9% of those under age 18 and 6.7% of those age 65 or over.

== Education ==
Most of it is in the Montello School District. Small pieces are in the Princeton School District.
