= Linden (town), Wisconsin =

Town in Iowa County, Wisconsin

Linden, Wisconsin
- Town
- Town of Linden
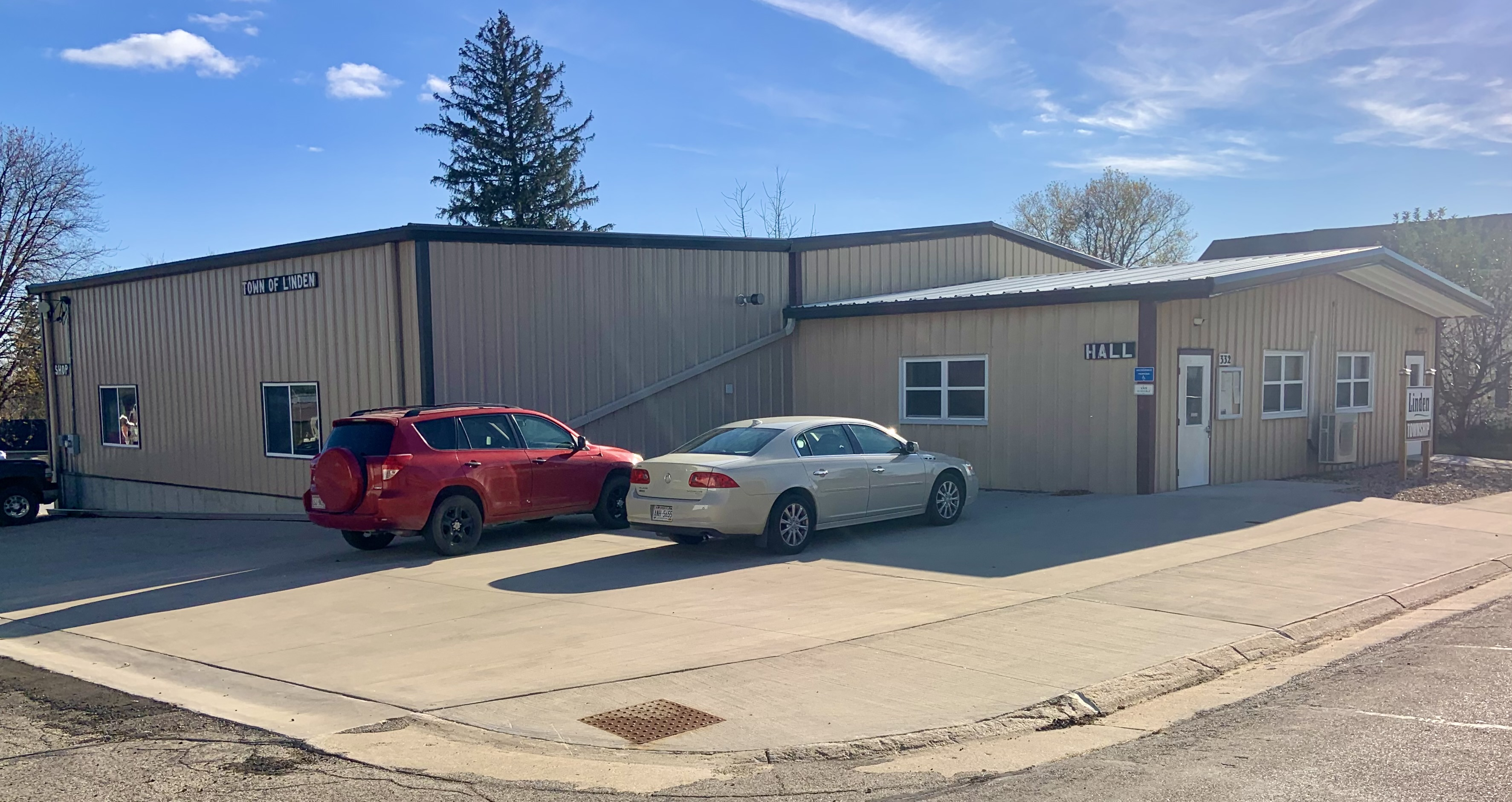
- Town Hall

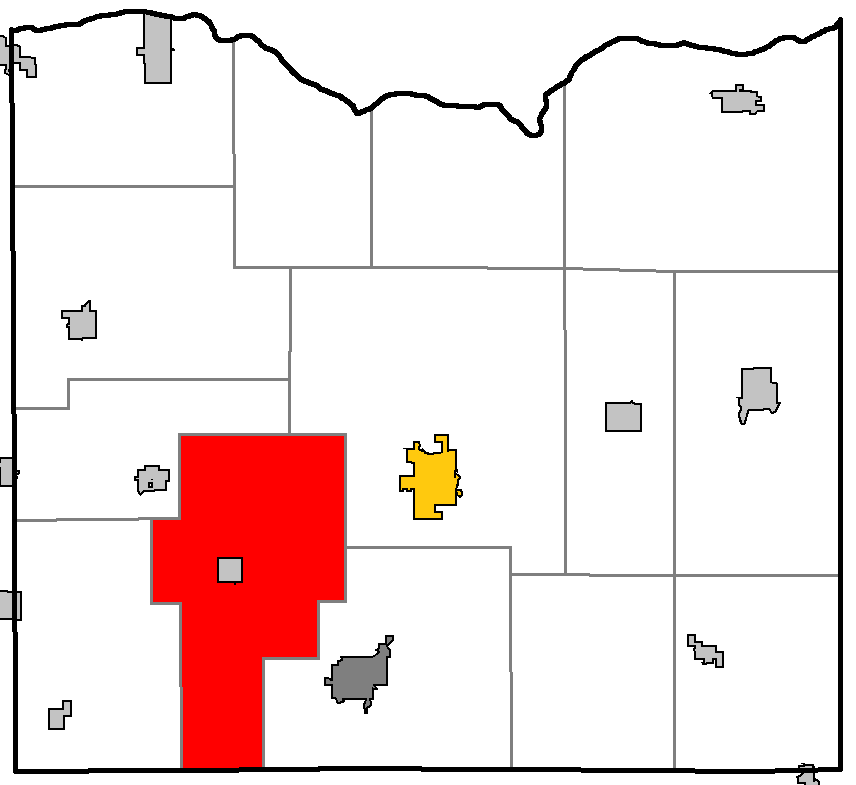
- Location of Linden, within Iowa County, Wisconsin

- Location of Iowa County, Wisconsin
- Coordinates: 42°54′53″N 90°15′46″W
- Country: United States
- State: Wisconsin
- Wisconsin: Iowa

Area
  - Total: 60.70 sq mi (157.2 km^{2})
  - Land: 60.69 sq mi (157.2 km^{2})
  - Water: 0.01 sq mi (0.026 km^{2})

Population (2020)
  - Total: 755
  - Density: 12.4/sq mi (4.80/km^{2})
- Time zone: UTC-6 (Central (CST))
  - Summer (DST): UTC-5 (CDT)
- Area code(s): 608 and 353
- GNIS feature ID: 1583574
- Website: https://townoflinden.com/

Linden is a town in Iowa County, Wisconsin, United States. The population was 755 at the 2020 census. The Village of Linden is located within the town. The unincorporated community of Edmund is also located in the town.

== Geography ==
According to the United States Census Bureau, the town has a total area of 60.7 square miles (157.1 km^{2}), of which 60.7 square miles (157.1 km^{2}) is land and 0.02% is water.

== Demographics ==
As of the census of 2000, there were 873 people, 295 households, and 212 families residing in the town. The population density was 14.4 people per square mile (5.6/km^{2}). There were 311 housing units at an average density of 5.1 per square mile (2.0/km^{2}). The racial makeup of the town was 99.08% White, 0.23% Black or African American, 0.23% Asian, and 0.46% from two or more races. 0.11% of the population were Hispanic or Latino of any race.

There were 295 households, out of which 35.3% had children under the age of 18 living with them, 62.0% were married couples living together, 6.8% had a female householder with no husband present, and 27.8% were non-families. 22.4% of all households were made up of individuals, and 7.8% had someone living alone who was 65 years of age or older. The average household size was 2.70 and the average family size was 3.18.

In the town, the population was spread out, with 26.0% under the age of 18, 5.6% from 18 to 24, 26.6% from 25 to 44, 23.1% from 45 to 64, and 18.7% who were 65 years of age or older. The median age was 40 years. For every 100 females, there were 102.6 males. For every 100 females age 18 and over, there were 97.6 males.

The median income for a household in the town was $36,726, and the median income for a family was $40,139. Males had a median income of $26,111 versus $22,237 for females. The per capita income for the town was $15,446. About 12.3% of families and 13.3% of the population were below the poverty line, including 18.1% of those under age 18 and 11.3% of those age 65 or over.
