= Manitowoc (town), Wisconsin =

Manitowoc, Wisconsin
- Town
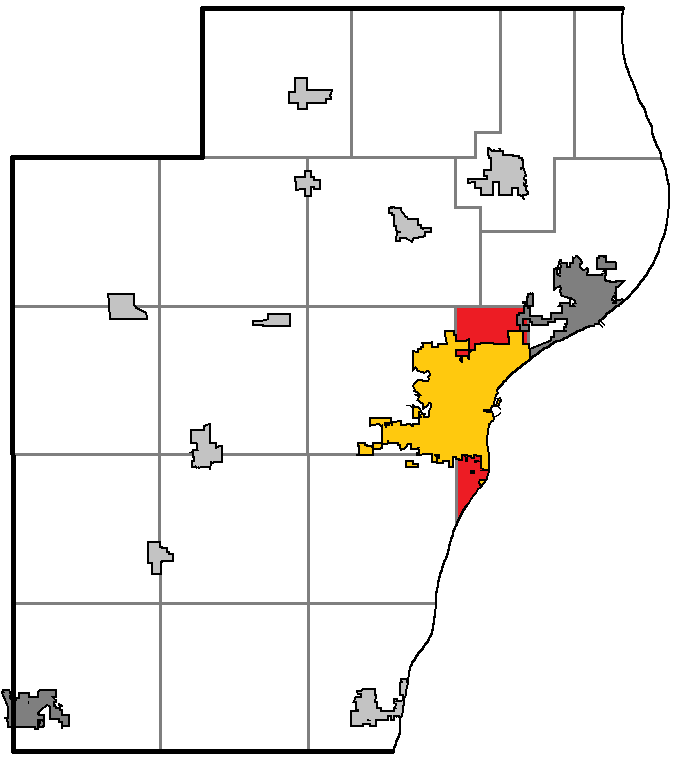
- Location of Manitowoc, within Manitowoc County
- Coordinates: 44°7′29″N 87°40′17″W
- Country: United States
- State: Wisconsin
- County: Manitowoc

Area
  - Total: 6.8 sq mi (17.6 km^{2})
  - Land: 6.8 sq mi (17.6 km^{2})
  - Water: 0 sq mi (0.0 km^{2})
- Elevation: 630 ft (192 m)

Population (2020)
  - Total: 1,076
  - Density: 158/sq mi (61.1/km^{2})
- Time zone: UTC-6 (Central (CST))
  - Summer (DST): UTC-5 (CDT)
- Area code: 920
- FIPS code: 55-48525
- GNIS feature ID: 1583637
- Website: townofmanitowoc.org

Manitowoc is a town in Manitowoc County, Wisconsin, United States. The population was 1,076 at the 2020 census. The city of Manitowoc divides the town into two noncontiguous sections, one north of the city and one south.

== Geography ==
According to the United States Census Bureau, the town has a total area of 6.8 square miles (17.6 km^{2}), all land.

== Demographics ==
As of the census of 2000, there were 1,073 people, 420 households, and 317 families residing in the town. The population density was 158.3 people per square mile (61.1/km^{2}). There were 442 housing units at an average density of 65.2 per square mile (25.2/km^{2}). The racial makeup of the town was 98.97% White, 0.19% Black or African American, 0.09% Native American, 0.28% Asian, 0.47% from other races. 0.47% of the population were Hispanic or Latino of any race.

There were 420 households, out of which 31.0% had children under the age of 18 living with them, 66.2% were married couples living together, 5.7% had a female householder with no husband present, and 24.3% were non-families. 19.3% of all households were made up of individuals, and 7.4% had someone living alone who was 65 years of age or older. The average household size was 2.55 and the average family size was 2.93.

In the town, the population was spread out, with 22.4% under the age of 18, 7.2% from 18 to 24, 27.5% from 25 to 44, 28.8% from 45 to 64, and 14.2% who were 65 years of age or older. The median age was 41 years. For every 100 females, there were 96.9 males. For every 100 females age 18 and over, there were 98.8 males.

The median income for a household in the town was $54,265, and the median income for a family was $60,568. Males had a median income of $37,121 versus $25,833 for females. The per capita income for the town was $23,583. About 1.6% of families and 3.0% of the population were below the poverty line, including 2.7% of those under age 18 and 5.6% of those age 65 or over.

== Resources ==
- The Home Front: Manitowoc County in World War II: A digital collection of resources contributed by Manitowoc County Historical Society, the Wisconsin Maritime Museum, the Manitowoc Public Library, and the Lester Public Library in Two Rivers. Presented by the University of Wisconsin Digital Collections Center.
