= John T. Kingston =

American politician

John Tabor Kingston (1819–1899) was an American politician. He was a member of the Wisconsin State Senate and the Wisconsin State Assembly.

== Biography ==
Kingston was born on January 31, 1819, in St. Clair County, Illinois. He later settled in what would become Necedah, Wisconsin, where he went into the lumber business with Eliphalet S. Miner. On June 17, 1851, Kingston married Hannah Dawes. They had eleven children. He died on March 26, 1899, in Necedah and was buried there. Kingston, Juneau County, Wisconsin, was named after him.

== Political career ==
Kingston was a member of the Senate three times. First, from 1856 to 1857, second, from 1860 to 1861 and third, from 1882 to 1883. He was a member of the Assembly in 1874 and again from 1880 to 1881. Other positions he held include President and Postmaster of Necedah and Register of Deeds of Juneau County, Wisconsin. Kingston was a Republican.
