= Wisconsin's 1st Senate district =

American legislative district in northeast Wisconsin

Wisconsin's 1st State Senate district
- 2024 map defined in 2023 Wisc. Act 94; 2022 map defined in Johnson v. Wisconsin Elections Commission; 2011 map was defined in 2011 Wisc. Act 43 composed of Assembly districts 1, 2, and 3
Senator
André Jacque; R–De Pere
since January 7, 2019 (7 years, 304 days)
- Demographics: 92.66% White; 0.81% Black; 3.1% Hispanic; 1.35% Asian; 1.51% Native American; 0.07% Hawaiian/Pacific Islander
- Population (2020) • Voting age: 178,600; 138,622
- Website: District website
- Notes: Door Peninsula and northeast Wisconsin

The 1st Senate district of Wisconsin is one of 33 districts in the Wisconsin Senate. Located in northeast Wisconsin, the district comprises all of Door and Kewaunee counties, as well as nearly all of Calumet County, much of northern and western Manitowoc County and eastern and southern Brown County, along with parts of southwest Outagamie County. It includes the cities of Sturgeon Bay and Chilton and parts of the cities of Appleton, Menasha, and Green Bay.

== Current elected officials ==
André Jacque is the senator representing the 1st district. He was first elected in the 2018 general election, after losing an earlier bid for the seat in a June 2018 special election. He previously served 8 years in the Wisconsin State Assembly, representing the 2nd Assembly district.

Each Wisconsin State Senate district is composed of three Wisconsin State Assembly districts. The 1st Senate district comprises the 1st, 2nd, and 3rd Assembly districts. The current representatives of those districts are:

- Assembly District 1: Joel Kitchens (R–Sturgeon Bay)
- Assembly District 2: Shae Sortwell (R–Two Rivers)
- Assembly District 3: Ron Tusler (R–Harrison)

Most of the district is located within Wisconsin's 8th congressional district, which is represented by U.S. Representative Tony Wied. The portion of the district in Manitowoc County falls within Wisconsin's 6th congressional district, represented by Glenn Grothman.

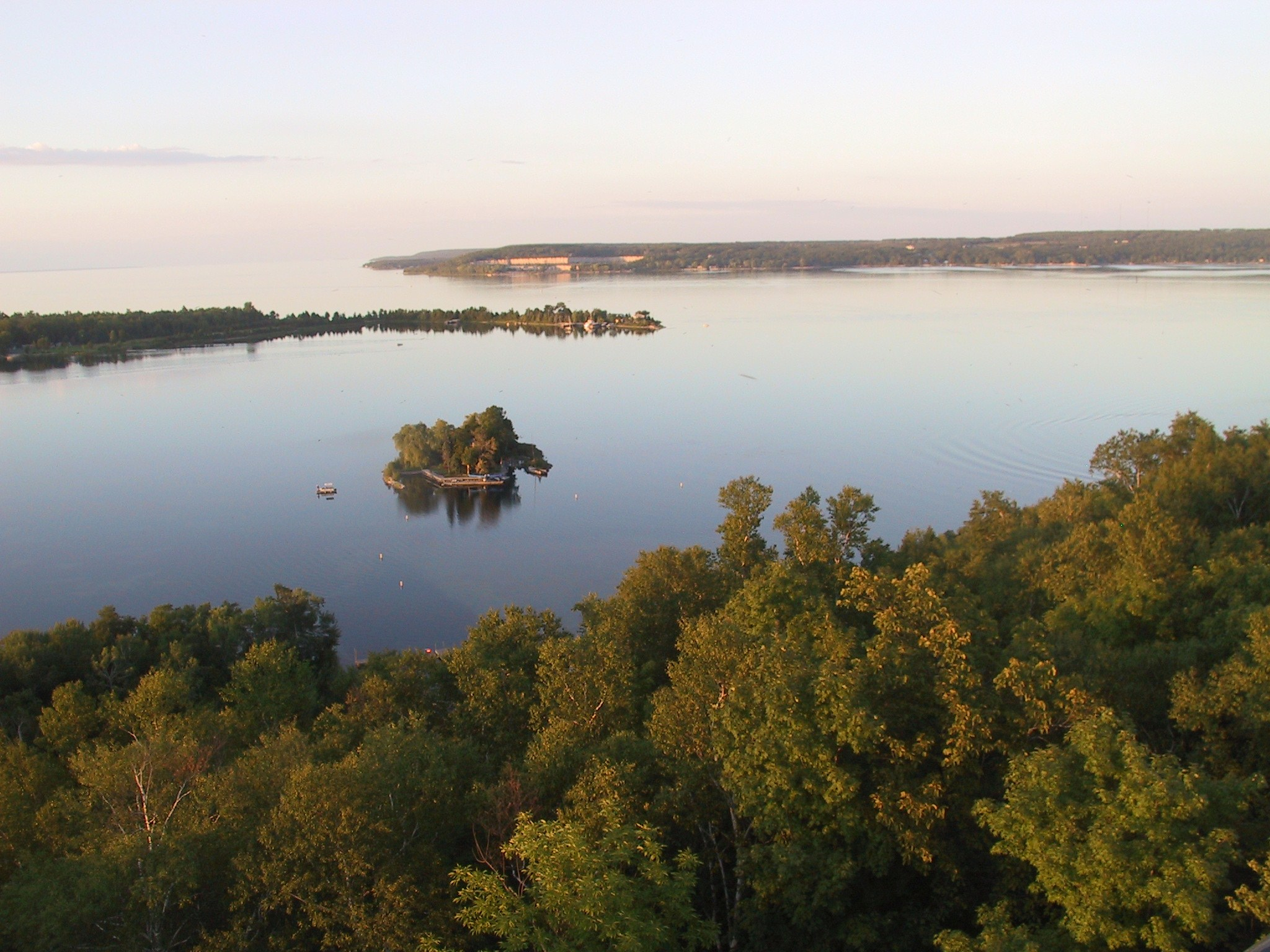
View from the Potawatomi State Park Observation Tower.

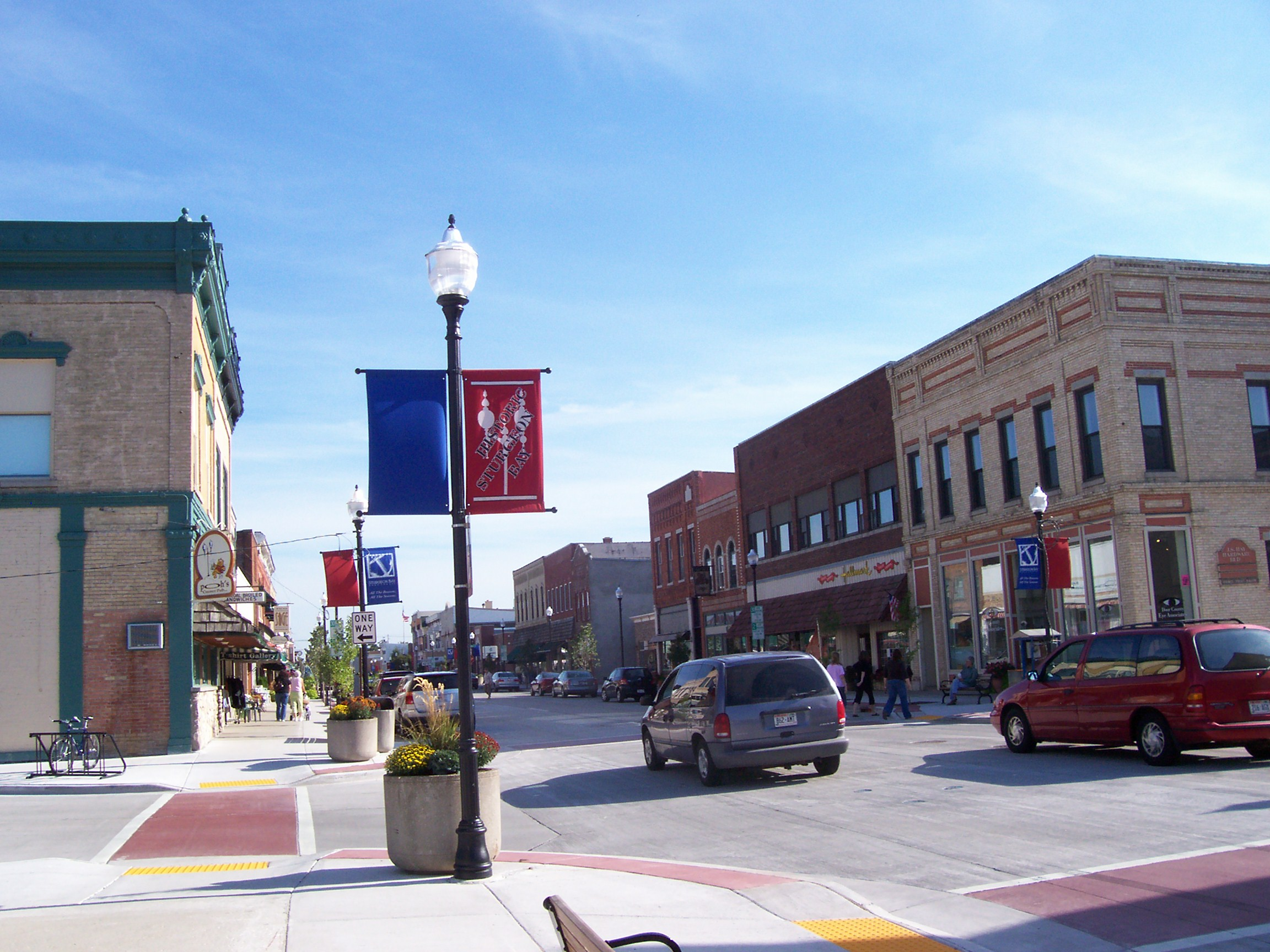
Third Avenue Historic District (Sturgeon Bay, Wisconsin).

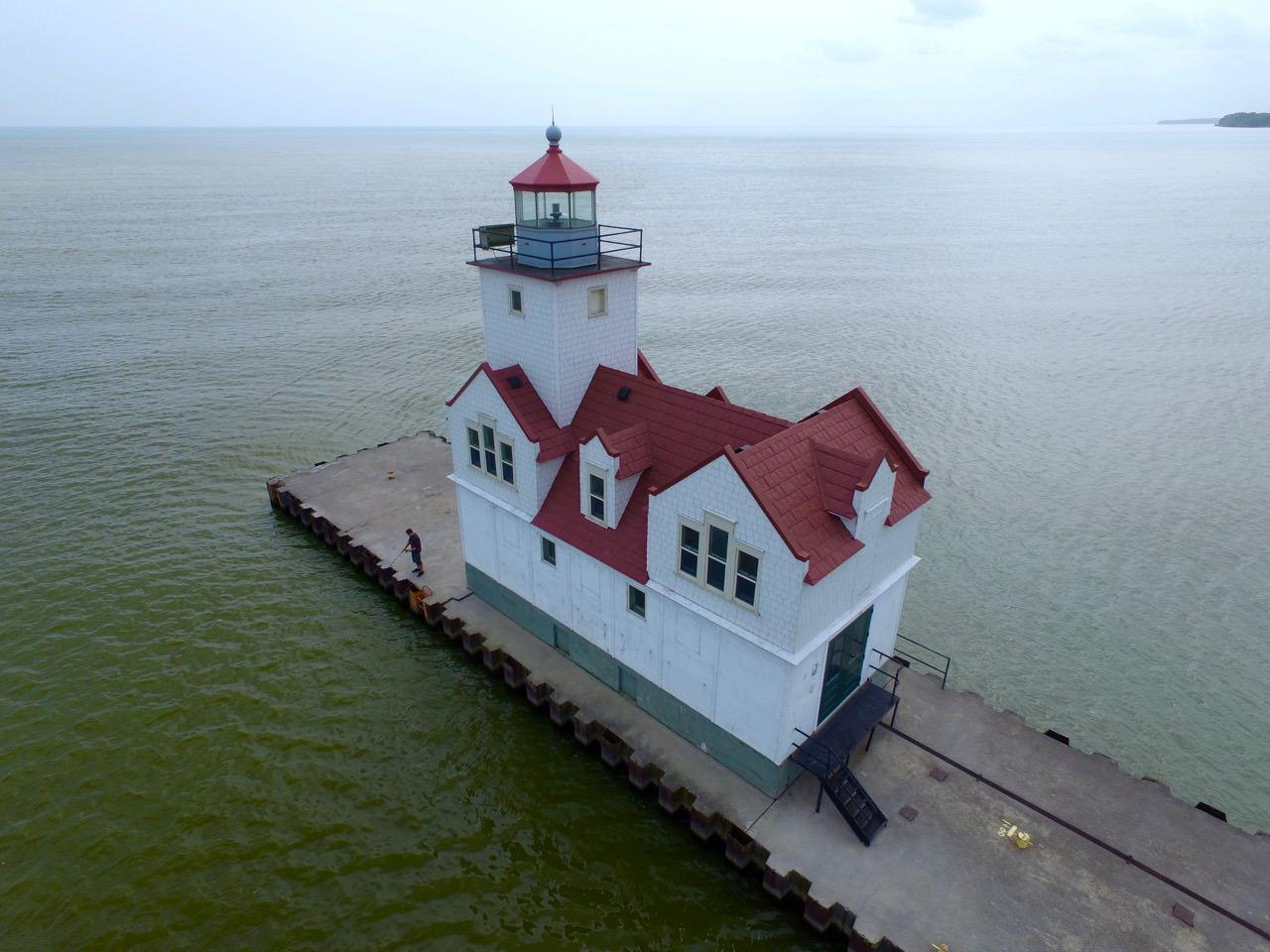
Kewaunee Pierhead Light.

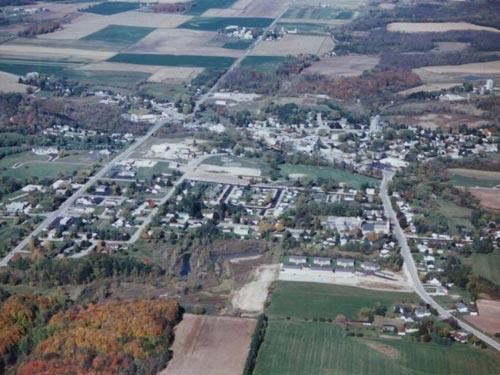
Mishicot, Wisconsin

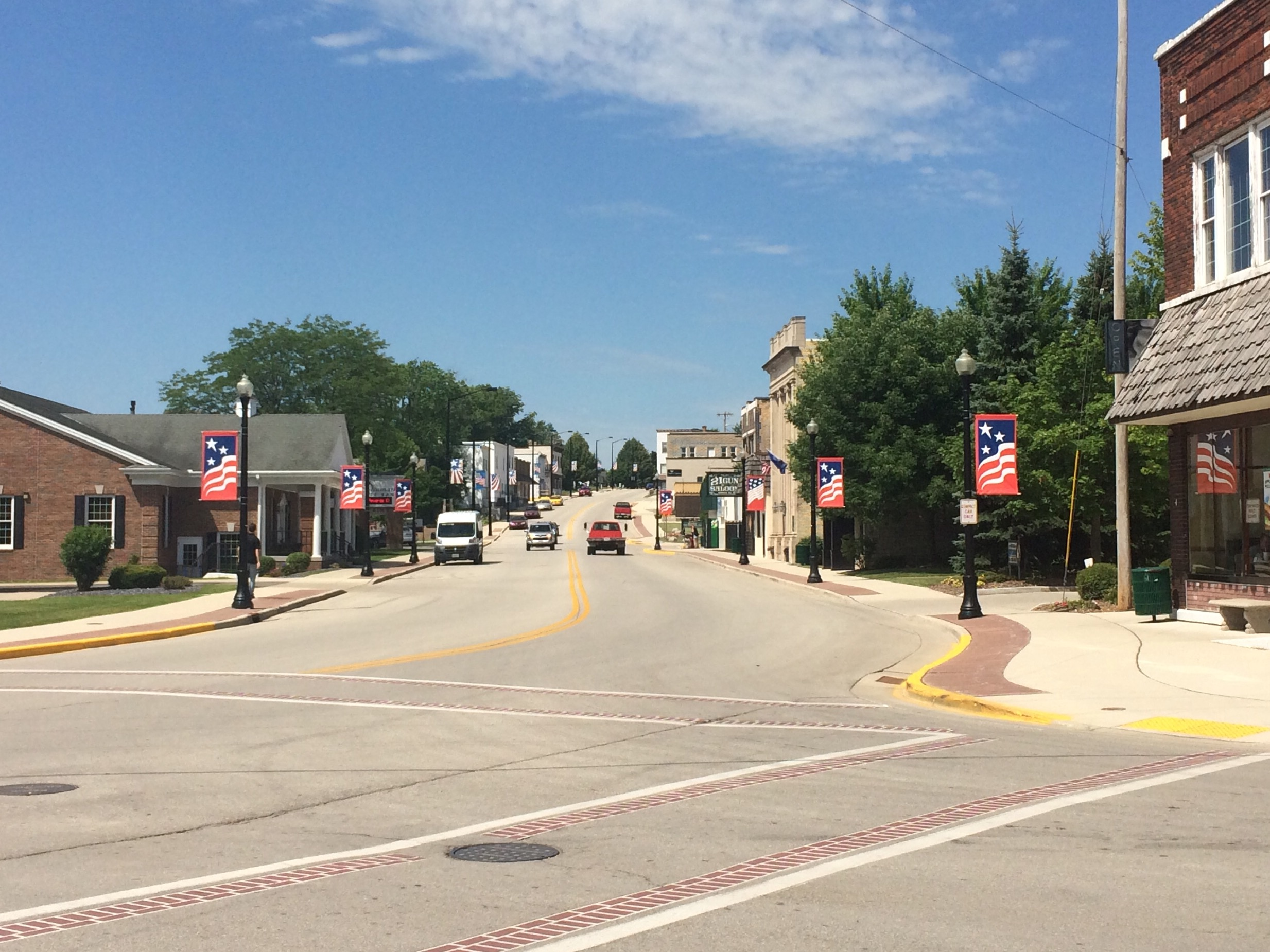
Denmark, Wisconsin

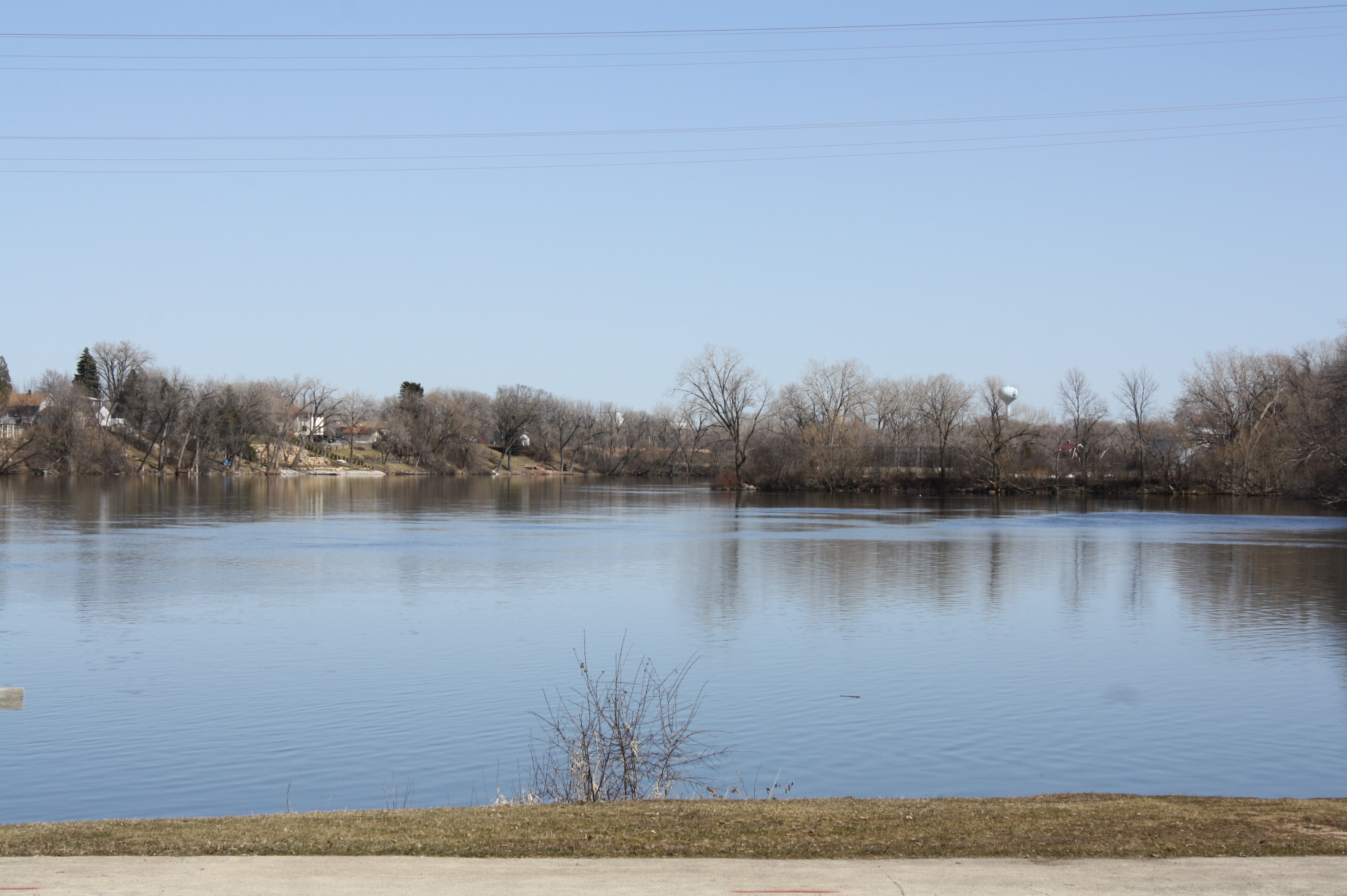
Fox River from Sunset Park in Kimberly

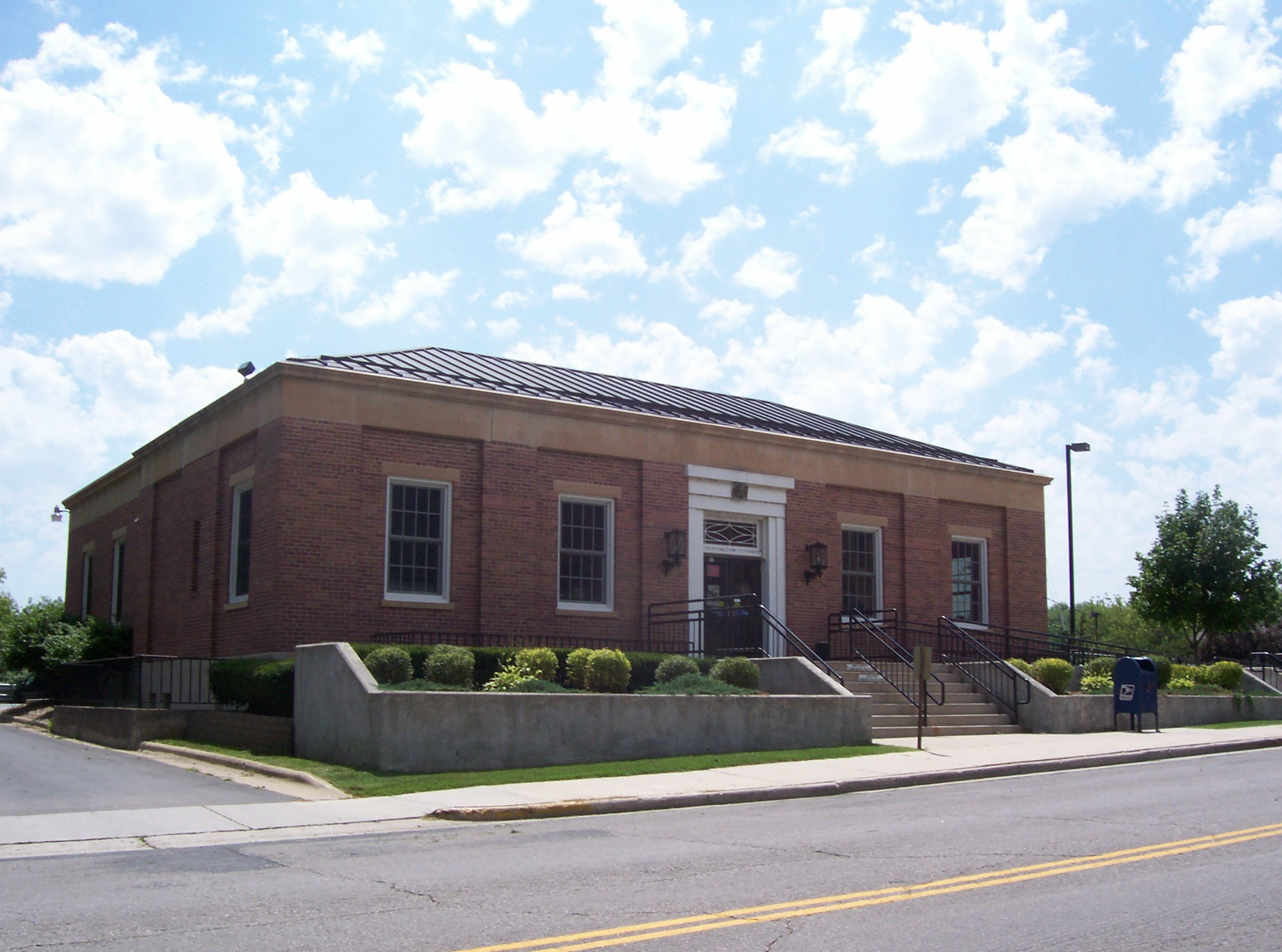
Chilton Post Office

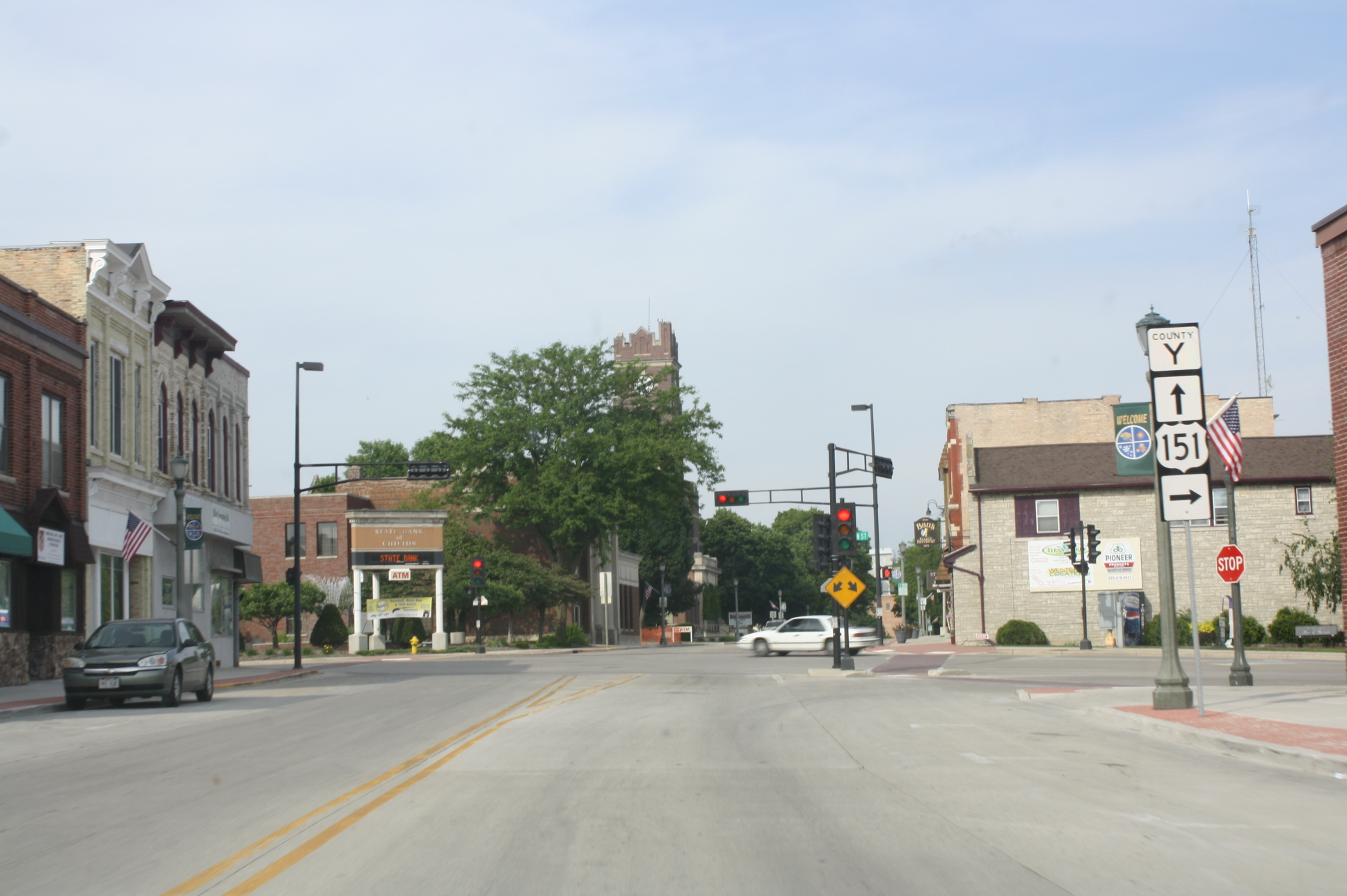
Uptown Chilton, Wisconsin

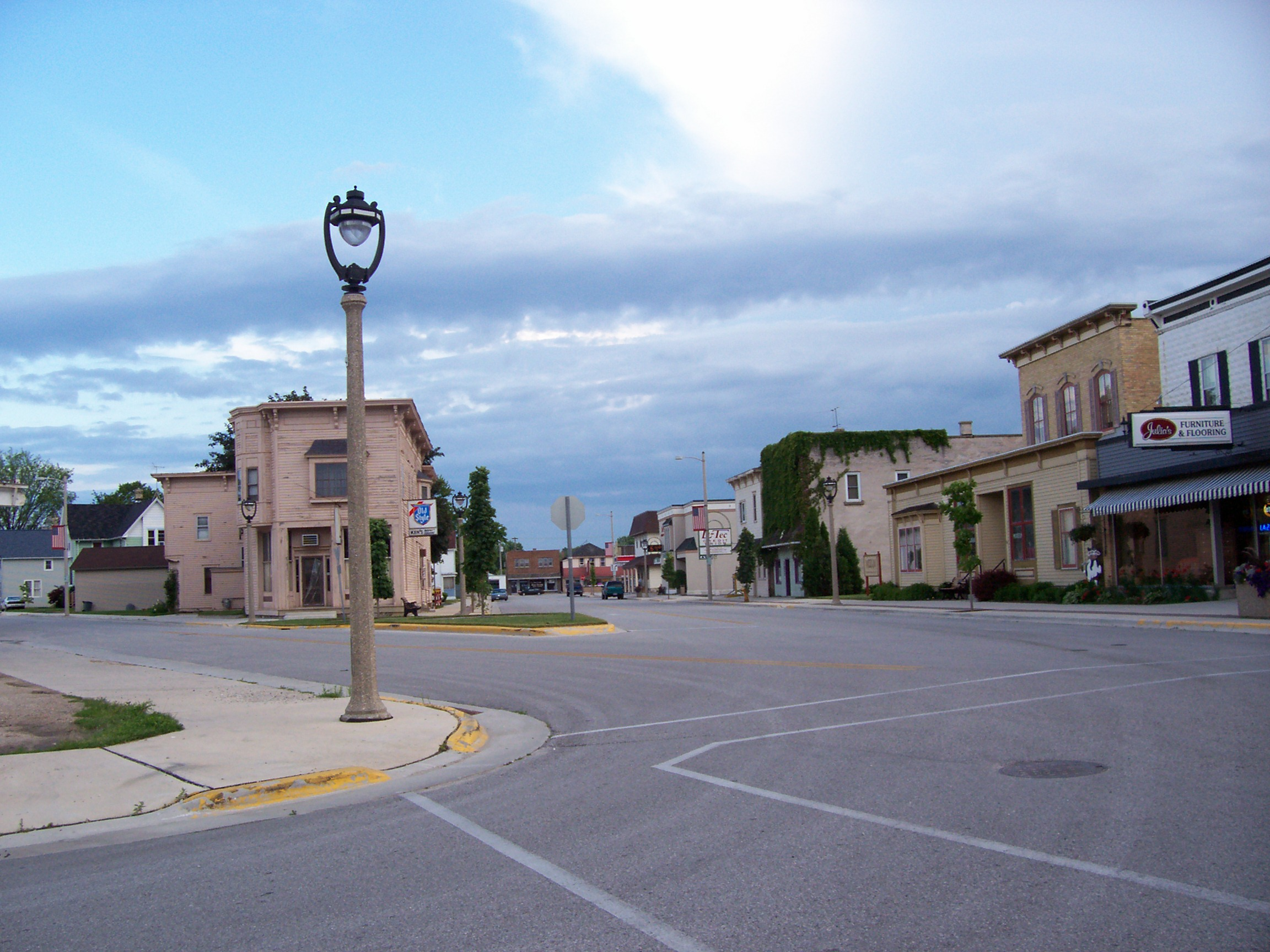
Downtown New Holstein

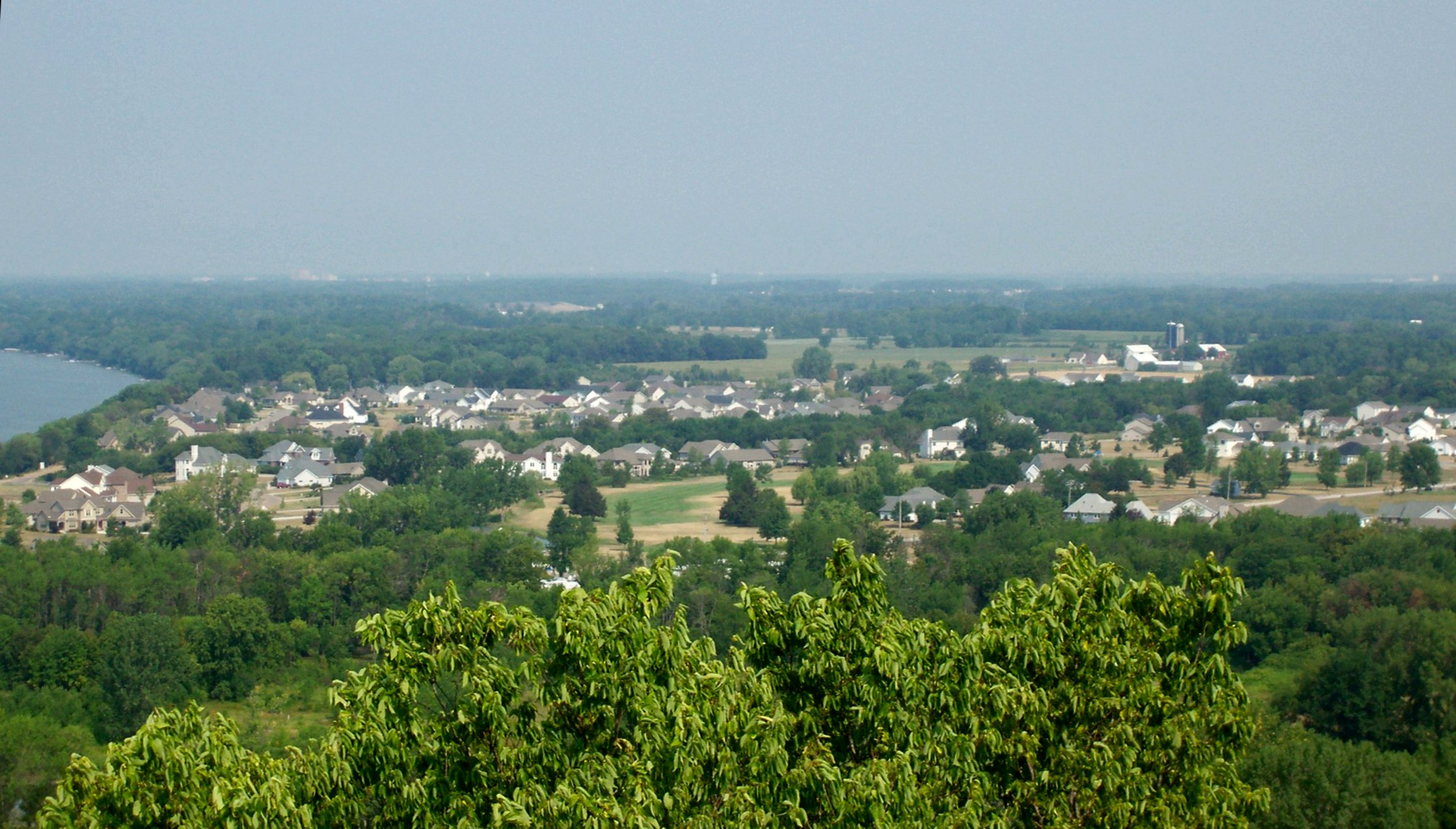
Sherwood viewed from High Cliff State Park

== History ==
At Wisconsin statehood, the Senate had only 19 districts. The 1st District consisted of Brown, Calumet, Manitowoc and Sheboygan counties.

For the 1853 session, the Senate was expanded to 25 members, and the 1st District lost Brown County.

For the 1857 session, the Senate was again expanded, to 30 members, and the District was reduced to Sheboygan County alone (the rest of the district became the new 19th District).

As of 1862, the Senate expanded to 33 seats, a size it would retain well into the 21st century; the 1st District remained unchanged.

The Senate was totally redistricted in 1876; Sheboygan County was now part of the 20th Senate District (along with part of Fond du Lac County). The new 1st District was made up of Door, Kewaunee, Oconto and Shawano counties, which had previously been part of the 2nd and 8th Districts.

Kewaunee and Shawano counties were removed from the district in 1888. Kewaunee was later re-added and Oconto removed in 1892—this district remained consistent for thirty years.

In 1922, the district moved to roughly its present boundaries when Marinette was removed and Manitowoc county was re-added. This district was stable for fifty years.

From 1972 to 2012 the district had been edited 6 times adding and removing small portions of Brown, Calumet, Fond du Lac, Manitowoc, and Outagamie counties.

== List of senators ==
Member	Party	Electoral history	Years	Leg. Term	District
District established March 13, 1848, by Art. XIV, Wis. Const.
Harrison C. Hobart (Sheboygan)	Democratic	Elected to the short term in May 1848. Elected to other office in Nov. 1848.	June 5, 1848 – January 1, 1849	1st	Brown, Calumet, Manitowoc, and Sheboygan counties
Lemuel Goodell (Stockbridge)	Democratic	Elected in 1848.	January 1, 1849 – January 6, 1851	2nd 3rd	Brown, Calumet, Manitowoc, and Sheboygan counties
Theodore Conkey (Appleton)	Democratic	Elected in 1850.	January 6, 1851 – January 3, 1853	4th 5th	Brown, Calumet, Manitowoc, and Sheboygan counties
Horatio N. Smith (Sheboygan) (Plymouth)	Democratic	Elected in 1852.	January 3, 1853 – January 1, 1855	6th 7th	Calumet, Manitowoc, and Sheboygan counties
David Taylor (Sheboygan)	Republican	Elected in 1854. Did not seek renomination.	January 1, 1855 – January 5, 1857	8th 9th	Calumet, Manitowoc, and Sheboygan counties
Elijah Fox Cook (Sheboygan)	Democratic	Elected in 1856.	January 5, 1857 – January 3, 1859	10th 11th	Sheboygan County
Robert H. Hotchkiss (Plymouth)	Democratic	Elected in 1858.	January 3, 1859 – January 7, 1861	12th 13th	Sheboygan County
Luther H. Cary (Greenbush)	Republican	Elected in 1860.	January 7, 1861 – January 5, 1863	14th 15th	Sheboygan County
John E. Thomas (Sheboygan Falls)	Democratic	Elected in 1862.	January 5, 1863 – January 2, 1865	16th 17th	Sheboygan County
John A. Bentley (Sheboygan)	National Union	Elected in 1864.	January 2, 1865 – January 7, 1867	18th 19th	Sheboygan County
Van Eps Young (Sheboygan)	National Union	Elected in 1866. Resigned.	January 7, 1867 – October 1867	20th	Sheboygan County
--Vacant--			October 1867 – January 6, 1868	20th	Sheboygan County
Robert H. Hotchkiss (Plymouth)	Democratic	Elected in 1867 special.	January 6, 1868 – January 4, 1869	21st	Sheboygan County
David Taylor (Sheboygan)	Republican	Elected in 1868. Did not seek renomination.	January 4, 1869 – January 2, 1871	22nd 23rd	Sheboygan County
John H. Jones (Sheboygan)	Republican	Elected in 1870.	January 2, 1871 – January 6, 1873	24th 25th	Sheboygan County
Patrick H. O'Rourk (Cascade) (Lyndon)	Democratic	Elected in 1872. Did not seek renomination.	January 6, 1873 – January 4, 1875	26th 27th	Sheboygan County
Enos Eastman (Plymouth)	Democratic	Elected in 1874.	January 4, 1875 – January 1, 1877	28th 29th	Sheboygan County
George Grimmer (Kewaunee)	Republican	Elected in 1876, 1878.	January 1, 1877 – January 3, 1881	30th 31st 32nd 33rd	Door, Kewaunee, Marinette, Oconto, Shawano counties
William A. Ellis (Peshtigo)	Republican	Elected in 1880.	January 3, 1881 – January 1, 1883	34th 35th	Door, Kewaunee, Marinette, Oconto, Shawano counties
Edward S. Minor (Sturgeon Bay)	Republican	Elected in 1882.	January 1, 1883 – January 3, 1887	36th 37th	Door, Florence, Kewaunee, Langlade, Marinette, Oconto counties
Edward Scofield (Oconto)	Republican	Elected in 1886. Claimed victory in 1890 election, but removed after election challenge.	January 3, 1887 – February 4, 1891	38th	Door, Florence, Kewaunee, Langlade, Marinette, Oconto counties
Edward Scofield (Oconto)	Republican	Elected in 1886. Claimed victory in 1890 election, but removed after election challenge.	January 3, 1887 – February 4, 1891	39th	Door, Marinette, and Oconto counties
John Fetzer (Forestville)	Democratic	Ruled winner of contested 1890 election.	February 4, 1891 – January 7, 1895	40th	Door, Marinette, and Oconto counties
John Fetzer (Forestville)	Democratic	Ruled winner of contested 1890 election.	February 4, 1891 – January 7, 1895	41st	Door, Kewaunee, and Marinette counties
De Wayne Stebbins (Ahnapee) (Algoma)	Republican	Elected in 1894.	January 7, 1895 – June 12, 1901	42nd	Door, Kewaunee, and Marinette counties
De Wayne Stebbins (Ahnapee) (Algoma)	Republican	Elected in 1894.	January 7, 1895 – June 12, 1901	43rd	Door, Kewaunee, and Marinette counties
De Wayne Stebbins (Ahnapee) (Algoma)	Republican	Re-elected in 1898. Died.	January 7, 1895 – June 12, 1901	44th	Door, Kewaunee, and Marinette counties
De Wayne Stebbins (Ahnapee) (Algoma)	Republican	Re-elected in 1898. Died.	January 7, 1895 – June 12, 1901	45th	Door, Kewaunee, and Marinette counties
--Vacant--			June 12, 1901 – January 5, 1903	45th	Door, Kewaunee, and Marinette counties
Harlan P. Bird (Wausaukee)	Republican	Elected in 1902, 1906. Retired.	January 5, 1903 – January 2, 1911	46th 47th 48th 49th	Door, Kewaunee, and Marinette counties
M. W. Perry (Algoma)	Republican	Elected in 1910.	January 2, 1911 – January 6, 1919	50th	Door, Kewaunee, and Marinette counties
M. W. Perry (Algoma)	Republican	Elected in 1910.	January 2, 1911 – January 6, 1919	51st	Door, Kewaunee, and Marinette counties
M. W. Perry (Algoma)	Republican	Re-elected in 1914. Lost renomination.	January 2, 1911 – January 6, 1919	52nd 53rd	Door, Kewaunee, and Marinette counties
Herbert Peterson (Sturgeon Bay)	Republican	Elected in 1918. Lost renomination.	January 6, 1919 – January 1, 1923	54th 55th	Door, Kewaunee, and Marinette counties
John E. Cashman (Franklin) (Denmark)	Republican	Elected in 1922, 1926, 1930.	January 1, 1923 – January 7, 1935	56th 57th 58th 59th 60th 61st	Door, Kewaunee, and Manitowoc counties
John E. Cashman (Franklin) (Denmark)	Progressive	Elected in 1934. Ran for other office in 1938.	January 7, 1935 – January 2, 1939	62nd 63rd	Door, Kewaunee, and Manitowoc counties
Francis A. Yindra (Manitowoc)	Democratic	Elected in 1938. Resigned.	January 2, 1939 – December 6, 1939	64th	Door, Kewaunee, and Manitowoc counties
--Vacant--			December 6, 1939 – January 6, 1941	64th	Door, Kewaunee, and Manitowoc counties
John E. Cashman (Denmark)	Progressive	Elected in 1940 special. Elected in 1942. Died.	January 6, 1941 – June 4, 1946	65th 66th	Door, Kewaunee, and Manitowoc counties
John E. Cashman (Denmark)	Progressive	Elected in 1940 special. Elected in 1942. Died.	January 6, 1941 – June 4, 1946	67th	Door, Kewaunee, and Manitowoc counties
--Vacant--			June 4, 1946 – January 6, 1947	67th	Door, Kewaunee, and Manitowoc counties
Everett LaFond (Two Rivers)	Republican	Elected in 1946, 1950.	January 6, 1947 – January 3, 1955	68th 69th 70th 71st	Door, Kewaunee, and Manitowoc counties
Alfred A. Laun Jr. (Kiel)	Republican	Elected in 1954, 1958.	January 3, 1955 – January 7, 1963	72nd 73rd 74th 75th	Door, Kewaunee, and Manitowoc counties
Alex Meunier (Sturgeon Bay)	Republican	Elected in 1962.	January 7, 1963 – January 4, 1971	76th	Door, Kewaunee, and Manitowoc counties
Alex Meunier (Sturgeon Bay)	Republican	Elected in 1962.	January 7, 1963 – January 4, 1971	77th	1964–1971; Door, Kewaunee, and Manitowoc counties
Alex Meunier (Sturgeon Bay)	Republican	Re-elected in 1966.	January 7, 1963 – January 4, 1971	78th 79th	1964–1971; Door, Kewaunee, and Manitowoc counties
Jerome Martin (Whitelaw)	Democratic	Elected in 1970.	January 4, 1971 – January 27, 1977	80th	1964–1971; Door, Kewaunee, and Manitowoc counties
Jerome Martin (Whitelaw)	Democratic	Elected in 1970.	January 4, 1971 – January 27, 1977	81st	Door, Kewaunee, and Manitowoc counties, and Eastern Brown County: Town of Eaton; Town of Glenmore; Town of Green Bay; Town of Holland; Town of Humboldt; Town of Morrison; Town of New Denmark; Town of Rockland; Town of Scott; Village of Denmark; Wards 14, 21, 22, City of Green Bay
Jerome Martin (Whitelaw)	Democratic	Re-elected in 1974. Died.	January 4, 1971 – January 27, 1977	82nd	Door, Kewaunee, and Manitowoc counties, and Eastern Brown County: Town of Eaton; Town of Glenmore; Town of Green Bay; Town of Holland; Town of Humboldt; Town of Morrison; Town of New Denmark; Town of Rockland; Town of Scott; Village of Denmark; Wards 14, 21, 22, City of Green Bay
Jerome Martin (Whitelaw)	Democratic	Re-elected in 1974. Died.	January 4, 1971 – January 27, 1977	83rd	Door, Kewaunee, and Manitowoc counties, and Eastern Brown County: Town of Eaton; Town of Glenmore; Town of Green Bay; Town of Holland; Town of Humboldt; Town of Morrison; Town of New Denmark; Town of Rockland; Town of Scott; Village of Denmark; Wards 14, 21, 22, City of Green Bay
--Vacant--			January 27, 1977 – May 12, 1977	83rd	Door, Kewaunee, and Manitowoc counties, and Eastern Brown County: Town of Eaton; Town of Glenmore; Town of Green Bay; Town of Holland; Town of Humboldt; Town of Morrison; Town of New Denmark; Town of Rockland; Town of Scott; Village of Denmark; Wards 14, 21, 22, City of Green Bay
Alan Lasee (De Pere) (Green Bay) (Rockland)	Republican	Elected in 1977 special. Elected in 1978.	May 12, 1977 – January 3, 2011	83rd	Door, Kewaunee, and Manitowoc counties, and Eastern Brown County: Town of Eaton; Town of Glenmore; Town of Green Bay; Town of Holland; Town of Humboldt; Town of Morrison; Town of New Denmark; Town of Rockland; Town of Scott; Village of Denmark; Wards 14, 21, 22, City of Green Bay
Alan Lasee (De Pere) (Green Bay) (Rockland)	Republican	Elected in 1977 special. Elected in 1978.	May 12, 1977 – January 3, 2011	84th 85th	Door, Kewaunee, and Manitowoc counties, and Eastern Brown County: Town of Eaton; Town of Glenmore; Town of Green Bay; Town of Holland; Town of Humboldt; Town of Morrison; Town of New Denmark; Town of Rockland; Town of Scott; Village of Denmark; Wards 14, 21, 22, City of Green Bay
Alan Lasee (De Pere) (Green Bay) (Rockland)	Republican	Elected in 1982.	May 12, 1977 – January 3, 2011	86th	Door and Kewaunee counties, and Eastern Brown County, northeast Calumet County, & northern Manitowoc County: Brown County; Town of Bellevue; Town of Eaton; Town of Green Bay; Town of Humboldt; Town of Morrison; Town of New Denmark; Town of Scott; Village of Denmark; Wards 1-6, 13-20, 22, city of Green Bay; Calumet County; Town of Charlestown; Town of Rantoul; Village of Hilbert; Village of Potter; Manitowoc County; Town of Cato; Town of Cooperstown; Town of Franklin; Town of Eaton; Town of Gibson; Town of Kossuth; Town of Maple Grove; Town of Manitowoc Rapids; Town of Mishicot; Town of Rockalnd; Town of Two Creeks; Town of Two Rivers; Village of Francis Creek; Village of Kellnersville; Village of Maribel; Village of Mishicot; Village of Reedsville; Village of Valders; City of Two Rivers
Alan Lasee (De Pere) (Green Bay) (Rockland)	Republican	Elected in 1982.	May 12, 1977 – January 3, 2011	87th	Door and Kewaunee counties, and Eastern Brown County: Town of De Pere; Town of Eaton; Town of Glenmore; Town of Green Bay; Town of Holland; Town of Humboldt; Town of Morrison; Town of New Denmark; Town of Rockland; Town of Scott; Village of Wrightstown; Most of Calumet County: Town of Brillion; Town of Brothertown; Town of Charlestown; Town of Chilton; Town of Harrison; Town of Rantoul; Town of Stockbridge; Town of Woodville; Village of Hilbert; Village of Potter; Village of Sherwood; Village of Stockbridge; City of Brillion; City of Chilton; Wards 9, 13, 21, 22, 23, City of Appleton; part of Fond du Lac County: Town of Calumet; Northern Manitowoc County: Town of Cato; Town of Cooperstown; Town of Franklin; Town of Eaton; Town of Gibson; Town of Kossuth; Town of Maple Grove; Town of Manitowoc Rapids; Town of Mishicot; Town of Rockalnd; Town of Two Creeks; Town of Two Rivers; Village of Francis Creek; Village of Kellnersville; Village of Maribel; Village of Mishicot; Village of Reedsville; Village of Whitelaw; City of Two Rivers; part of Outagamie County: Town of Buchanan; Wards 2, 5, 10, 11, 20, 24, City of Appleton
Alan Lasee (De Pere) (Green Bay) (Rockland)	Republican	Elected in 1986, 1990.	May 12, 1977 – January 3, 2011	88th 89th 90th	
Alan Lasee (De Pere) (Green Bay) (Rockland)	Republican	Elected in 1986, 1990.	May 12, 1977 – January 3, 2011	91st	Door and Kewaunee counties, and Eastern Brown County: Town of Bellevue; Town of Eaton; Town of Glenmore; Town of Green Bay; Town of Holland; Town of Humboldt; Town of Ledgeview; Town of Morrison; Town of New Denmark; Town of Rockland; Town of Scott; Town of Wrightstown; Village of Denmark; Wards 3, 4, 5, 6, City of De Pere; Most of Calumet County: Town of Brillion; Town of Brothertown; Town of Charlestown; Town of Chilton; Town of Harrison; Town of Rantoul; Town of Stockbridge; Town of Woodville; Village of Hilbert; Village of Potter; Village of Sherwood; Village of Stockbridge; City of Brillion; City of Chilton; Ward 1, Town of New Holstein; Wards 10, 11, 35, 37, 39, 40, 41, City of Appleton; part of Fond du Lac County: Town of Calumet; Town of Marshfield; Village of Mount Calvary; Village of St. Cloud; Wards 1, 2, Town of Taycheedah; Northern Manitowoc County: Town of Cato; Town of Cooperstown; Town of Franklin; Town of Eaton; Town of Gibson; Town of Kossuth; Town of Maple Grove; Town of Manitowoc Rapids; Town of Mishicot; Town of Rockalnd; Town of Two Creeks; Town of Two Rivers; Village of Francis Creek; Village of Kellnersville; Village of Maribel; Village of Mishicot; Village of Reedsville; Village of Whitelaw; City of Two Rivers; part of Outagamie County: Wards 5, 8, 9, 12, City of Appleton
Alan Lasee (De Pere) (Green Bay) (Rockland)	Republican	Elected in 1994, 1998.	May 12, 1977 – January 3, 2011	92nd 93rd 94th 95th	
Alan Lasee (De Pere) (Green Bay) (Rockland)	Republican	Elected in 2002, 2006. Retired.	May 12, 1977 – January 3, 2011	96th 97th 98th 99th	Door and Kewaunee counties, Eastern Brown County: Town of Eaton; Town of Glenmore; Town of Green Bay; Town of Holland; Town of Humboldt; Town of Ledgeview; Town of Morrison; Town of New Denmark; Town of Rockland; Town of Scott; Town of Wrightstown; Village of Bellevue; Village of Denmark; Village of Wrightstown; Northern Calumet County: Town of Brillion; Town of Chilton; Town of Harrison; Town of Stockbridge; Town of Woodville; Village of Hilbert; Village of Sherwood; Village of Stockbridge; City of Brillion; City of Chilton; Wards 10, 11, 35, 37, 39, 40, 41, City of Appleton; Wards of City of Menasha; Northern Manitowoc County: Town of Cooperstown; Town of Franklin; Town of Gibson; Town of Kossuth; Town of Maple Grove; Town of Mishicot; Town of Two Creeks; Town of Two Rivers; Village of Francis Creek; Village of Kellnersville; Village of Maribel; Village of Mishicot; City of Two Rivers; part of Outagamie County: Town of Buchanan; Village of Combined Locks; Village of Kimberly; Wards 5, 6, 7, 11, Village of Little Chute
Frank Lasee (De Pere)	Republican	Elected in 2010.	January 3, 2011 – December 29, 2017	100th	
Frank Lasee (De Pere)	Republican	Elected in 2010.	January 3, 2011 – December 29, 2017	101st	Door and Kewaunee counties, Eastern Brown County: Town of Eaton; Town of Green Bay; Town of Holland; Town of Humboldt; Town of Lawrence; Town of Morrison; Town of New Denmark; Town of Rockland; Town of Scott; Town of Wrightstown; Village of Denmark; Village of Wrightstown; Part of Town of Ledgeview; Part of City of De Pere; Part of Ward 1, City of Green Bay; Northern Calumet County: Town of Brillion; Town of Harrison; Town of Stockbridge; Town of Woodville; Village of Hilbert; Village of Sherwood; Village of Stockbridge; City of Brillion; City of Chilton; Wards 10, 11, 35, 37, 39, 40, 41, City of Appleton; Wards of City of Menasha; Northern Manitowoc County: Town of Cooperstown; Town of Franklin; Town of Gibson; Town of Kossuth; Town of Mishicot; Town of Two Creeks; Town of Two Rivers; Village of Francis Creek; Village of Kellnersville; Village of Maribel; Village of Mishicot; City of Two Rivers; part of Outagamie County: Town of Buchanan; Village of Combined Locks; Village of Kimberly; Wards 3, 7, 9, 10, 11, Village of Little Chute
Frank Lasee (De Pere)	Republican	Elected in 2014. Resigned.	January 3, 2011 – December 29, 2017	102nd	
Frank Lasee (De Pere)	Republican	Elected in 2014. Resigned.	January 3, 2011 – December 29, 2017	103rd	
--Vacant--			December 29, 2017 – June 28, 2018	103rd	
Caleb Frostman (Sturgeon Bay)	Democratic	Elected in 2018 special. Lost re-election.	June 28, 2018 – January 7, 2019	103rd	
André Jacque (De Pere) (New Franken)	Republican	Elected in 2018.	January 7, 2019 – Current	104th 105th	
André Jacque (De Pere) (New Franken)	Republican	Elected in 2022.	January 7, 2019 – Current	106th	Door and Kewaunee counties, northeast Manitowoc County eastern and southern Brown County northern Calumet County part of Outagamie County
André Jacque (De Pere) (New Franken)	Republican	Elected in 2022.	January 7, 2019 – Current	107th	
Nic Cravillion (New Franken)	Republican	Elected in 2026.	taking office January 2027	108th	

== See also ==
Political subdivisions of Wisconsin
