= De Wayne Stebbins =

19th century American politician

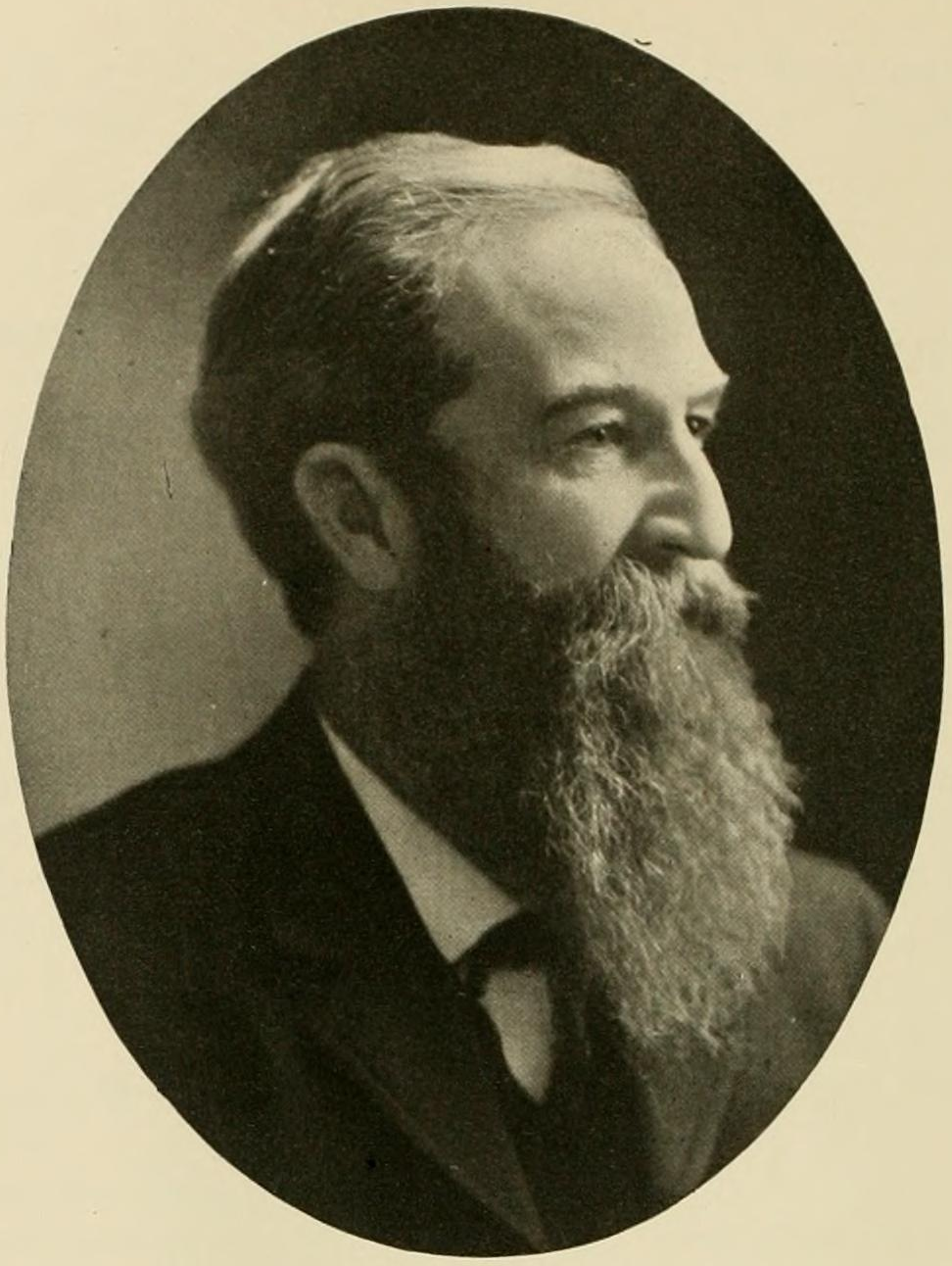
- From The Stebbins Genealogy Vol. 2 (1904)

Member of the Wisconsin Senate from the 1st district
- In office January 7, 1895 – June 12, 1901
- Preceded by: John Fetzer
- Succeeded by: Harlan P. Bird

Member of the Wisconsin State Assembly from the Door–Kewaunee district
- In office January 6, 1873 – January 5, 1874
- Preceded by: Gideon Winans Allen
- Succeeded by: Dennis A. Reed

Personal details
- Born: April 5, 1835 Clinton, Oneida County, New York, U.S.
- Died: June 12, 1901 (aged 66) Algoma, Wisconsin, U.S.
- Resting place: Evergreen Cemetery, Algoma, Wisconsin
- Party: Republican
- Spouse: Frances E. Elliott (m. 1862–1901)
- Children: none
- Education: United States Naval Academy
- Occupation: Newspaper publisher, banker

Military service
- Allegiance: United States
- Branch/service: United States Volunteers; Union Army; United States Navy
- Years of service: 1862 (USV); 1862–1865 (USN)
- Rank: Corporal, USV; Master, USN
- Unit: 21st Reg. Wis. Vol. Infantry; USS Clara Dolsen; USS Cincinnati; USS Mound City; USS Kickapoo; USS Fearnot; USS Portsmouth; USS Michigan
- Battles/wars: American Civil War: Vicksburg campaign; Battle of Mobile Bay

De Wayne Stebbins (April 5, 1835 – June 12, 1901) was an American newspaper publisher, banker, politician, and Wisconsin pioneer. He was a member of the Wisconsin State Senate for the last seven years of his life, representing the northeast corner of the state. He also served one term in the State Assembly. During the American Civil War, he served as a Union Navy officer.

== Biography ==
De Wayne Stebbins was born in Clinton, Oneida County, New York, in 1835, and came to the Wisconsin Territory with his parents in the fall of that same year, settling in what is now Racine, Wisconsin. He was educated there in the common schools and resided there until 1852, when he went east to attend the United States Naval Academy at Annapolis, Maryland. He left the school in 1855 without graduating and returned to Wisconsin to accept a job with the American Fur Company. In 1856, he moved to the town of Ahnapee in Kewaunee County, in the region that later became the city of Algoma.

In the late 1850s, he decided to go west to participate in the California Gold Rush, but returned in March 1861 with little to show for it.

== Civil War service ==
After the outbreak of the American Civil War, he applied for service with the United States Navy. After a few months, he became impatient waiting for a naval appointment, and volunteered for service in the Union Army. He was enrolled as a corporal in Company K of the 21st Wisconsin Infantry Regiment, but before the regiment could be fully organized, he received his naval appointment as an acting master's mate. He was initially assigned to the USS Clara Dolsen, but after two months transferred to the USS Cincinnati and was promoted to acting ensign. After two more months, he was transferred to the USS Mound City.

He served aboard the Mound City during the Vicksburg campaign and participated in the battles of Chickasaw Bayou, Grand Gulf, and Arkansas Post, was part of the naval squadron at the Siege of Vicksburg, and then served in various posts on the Union blockade of the south. He was acting executive officer for the USS Kickapoo from July through December 1864. He was then promoted to acting master and served two months aboard the USS Fearnot, and then transferred to USS Portsmouth through the end of the war. At the close of the war, he was transferred to the USS Michigan in the Great Lakes and was honorably discharged in November 1865.

One notable anecdote from the Vicksburg campaign had Stebbins as officer of the watch one night when they were approached by men in a small skiff. Stebbins initially ordered his men to fire on the skiff, believing them to be spies or saboteurs, but held off, realizing the skiff carried General Ulysses S. Grant.

== Business and political career ==
After being discharged from the Navy, Stebbins returned to Algoma. He worked in the forwarding and commission business for nearly 15 years in partnership with C. G. Boalt, under the firm name Boalt & Stebbins.

During these years, he became active in local politics, he served 27 years on the Kewaunee County board of supervisors, and also served as town treasurer and member of the school board. He made his first attempt for state office in 1870, running as the Republican Party candidate for Wisconsin State Assembly in the Door–Kewaunee district. He was defeated in the general election by Democrat Joseph McCormick, but returned for another attempt two years later and won election to the 26th Wisconsin Legislature. He did not run for re-election in 1873. After his term in the Assembly, he became publisher of the Ahnapee Record newspaper and continued to publish the paper until his death, by which time it was known as the Algoma Record.

In 1881, he joined the Bank of Ahnapee as cashier, and would remain involved with the bank until his death.

He returned to the Legislature in 1895, winning election to the Wisconsin State Senate in the 1st State Senate district. At the time, his district comprised all of Door, Kewaunee, and Marinette counties. He was re-elected in 1898. Stebbins was well liked by his fellow legislators, and treated as an elder statesman. At the close of the 1901 session of the Legislature, his colleagues presented him with a gold-headed ebony cane.

He was a candidate for Governor of Wisconsin at the Republican state convention in 1900, but stepped aside in favor of Robert M. La Follette.

While serving in the State Senate, he was a member of the Wisconsin battleship commission and traveled to San Francisco, California, for the launch of the USS Wisconsin. He was severely fatigued after his trip, and died a few months later at his home in Algoma.

== Personal life and legacy ==
De Wayne Stebbins was one of at least seven children born to Amaziah Stebbins and his wife Amanda (née Anderson).

Stebbins married the widow Frances Newell (née Elliott) at Oshkosh, Wisconsin, in 1862. They had no children.

Hotelier Frank Slaby of Algoma in 1905 changed the name of his establishment to Hotel Stebbins, honoring his late friend. Hotel Stebbins is still operating today as a hotel and event space.

== Electoral history ==
=== Wisconsin Assembly (1870) ===
Wisconsin Assembly, Door–Kewaunee District Election, 1870
Party	Candidate	Votes	%	±%
General Election, November 8, 1870
Democratic	Joseph McCormick	1,083	52.02%	+2.12%
Republican	De Wayne Stebbins	999	47.98%	
Plurality		84	4.03%	+3.83%
Total votes		2,082	100.0%	+44.89%
Democratic gain from Republican				

=== Wisconsin Assembly (1872) ===
Wisconsin Assembly, Door–Kewaunee District Election, 1872
Party	Candidate	Votes	%	±%
General Election, November 5, 1872
Republican	De Wayne Stebbins	1,343	61.80%	+17.89%
Democratic	Marcus McCormick	830	38.20%	
Plurality		513	23.61%	+11.44%
Total votes		2,173	100.0%	+41.38%
Republican gain from Democratic				

=== Wisconsin Senate (1894, 1898) ===
Wisconsin Senate, 1st District Election, 1894
Party	Candidate	Votes	%	±%
General Election, November 6, 1894
Republican	De Wayne Stebbins	6,332	57.00%	+7.11%
Democratic	C. C. Daily	4,571	41.15%	
Prohibition	G. A. Jacobson	206	1.85%	
Plurality		1,761	15.85%	+15.62%
Total votes		11,109	100.0%	+68.50%
Republican gain from Democratic				

Wisconsin Senate, 1st District Election, 1898
Party	Candidate	Votes	%	±%
General Election, November 8, 1898
Republican	De Wayne Stebbins (incumbent)	5,849	61.18%	+7.11%
Democratic	Amos Holgate	3,711	38.82%	
Plurality		2,138	22.36%	+6.51%
Total votes		9,560	100.0%	-13.94%
Republican hold				

Wisconsin State Assembly
Preceded by Gideon Winans Allen	Member of the Wisconsin State Assembly from the Door–Kewaunee district January 6, 1873 – January 5, 1874	Succeeded by Dennis A. Reed
Wisconsin Senate
Preceded by John Fetzer	Member of the Wisconsin Senate from the 1st district January 7, 1895 – June 12, 1901	Succeeded by Harlan P. Bird
