= M. W. Perry =

20th century American politician

Member of the Wisconsin Senate from the 1st district
- In office January 2, 1911 – January 6, 1919
- Preceded by: Harlan P. Bird
- Succeeded by: Herbert Peterson

Mayor of Algoma, Wisconsin
- In office April 1910 – April 1914

Personal details
- Born: February 26, 1864 Racine, Wisconsin, U.S.
- Died: February 18, 1951 (aged 86) Delray Beach, Florida, U.S.
- Resting place: Evergreen Cemetery, Algoma, Wisconsin
- Party: Republican
- Spouse: Mary Josephine Esser (m. 1884–1951)
- Children: 2
- Occupation: Carpenter, millwright, businessman

Melvin Withington Perry (February 26, 1864 – February 18, 1951) was an American businessman and Republican politician from Kewaunee County, Wisconsin. He was a member of the Wisconsin Senate, representing Wisconsin's 1st State Senate district from 1911 through 1919. His name was almost always abbreviated as M. W. Perry.

== Biography ==
Perry was born in Racine, Wisconsin. His parents at that time were residents of Algoma, Wisconsin. He attended public school until age 14, and then went to work as a carpenter and millwright, and was contracted to build homes in Kewaunee, Algoma, and Sturgeon Bay. In 1886, he went to Milwaukee to look for work, but instead ended up in Sheboygan, Wisconsin, where he was employed in a factory and rose to become superintendent.

He returned to Algoma in 1892, gathered investors, and started the Ahnapee Veneer and Seating Co. The business flourished, growing from 30 to 800 employees, and Perry was soon overseeing factories in Algoma and Birchwood. The company was later renamed the Algoma Plywood and Veneer Company. He operated it for over 40 years before selling the business to the U.S. Plywood Company in 1941.

In Algoma, he became active with the Republican Party of Wisconsin and was a delegate to several state conventions in the late 1890s and early 1900s. He was elected as an alternate delegate to the 1904 Republican National Convention.

In the spring election of 1910, he was elected mayor of Algoma and ultimately served four years in that office. In the fall of 1910, he was also elected to a four-year term in the Wisconsin Senate, representing Wisconsin's 1st State Senate district. The 1st Senate district, at that time, comprised all of Door, Kewaunee, and Marinette counties in the northeast corner of Wisconsin. He was re-elected to the Senate in 1914, but was defeated in a primary challenge when he ran for a third term in 1918.

== Personal life and family ==
Melvin Perry was a son of William and Sophronia (née Beech) Perry. William Perry operated a chair-making factory in Algoma.

Melvin Perry married Mary Josephine Esser on September 27, 1891. They had two sons. Their younger son, Ralph H. Perry, was captain of Company F in the 128th U.S. Infantry Regiment during World War I. He was badly wounded in the Meuse–Argonne offensive on November 10, 1918—the day before the armistice—and died twelve days later.

In 1924, Perry granted a large tract of land to the city of Algoma to create the "Ralph Perry Athletic Field". The Perry Field is still in use as a recreational park in Algoma.

Perry's surviving son, William, moved to Delray Beach, Florida. In his old age, Perry went to live with his son in Florida. He died in Delray Beach on February 18, 1951, after about three years of poor health.

Perry's former home in Algoma, now known as the Melvin W. and Mary Perry House, is listed on the National Register of Historic Places.

Wisconsin Senate
Preceded by Harlan P. Bird	Member of the Wisconsin Senate from the 1st district January 2, 1911 – January 6, 1919	Succeeded by Herbert Peterson
