= Frank N. Graass =

American politician

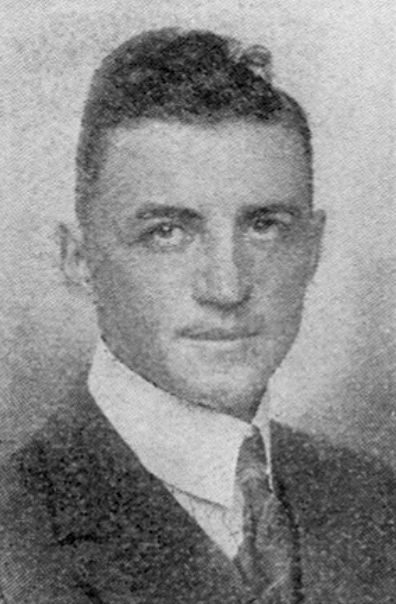

Member of the Wisconsin State Assembly
- In office January 3, 1955 – January 2, 1961
- Preceded by: District established
- Succeeded by: Lawrence Johnson
- Constituency: Door–Kewaunee district
- In office January 1, 1951 – January 3, 1955
- Preceded by: Hallie H. Rowe
- Succeeded by: District abolished
- Constituency: Door County district
- In office January 7, 1935 – January 4, 1943
- Preceded by: William H. Moore
- Succeeded by: Alex Meunier
- Constituency: Door County district
- In office January 1, 1917 – January 3, 1921
- Preceded by: Fred S. Hanson
- Succeeded by: John Peltier
- Constituency: Door County district

Personal details
- Born: August 19, 1885 Sturgeon Bay, Wisconsin, US
- Died: July 28, 1973 (aged 87) Sturgeon Bay, Wisconsin, US
- Party: Republican

Frank N. Graass (August 19, 1885 - July 28, 1973) was a member of the Wisconsin State Assembly.

== Biography ==
Graass's grave (front, center) at Bayside Cemetery

Graass was born on August 19, 1885, in Sturgeon Bay, Wisconsin. He graduated Sturgeon Bay High School in 1905. He entered the forest seed business and was the director of a fruit growers co-operative. He died on July 28, 1973, in Sturgeon Bay, and was buried there at Bayside Cemetery.

== Career ==
Graass served two terms as president in the Door County chamber of commerce. He was also a member of the Assembly on three occasions. First, from 1917 to 1919, second, from 1935 to 1942 and third, from 1951 to 1960. Additionally, he was a legislative and financial secretary for Governor Walter Samuel Goodland. He was a Republican.
