= Everett LaFond =

American politician

Member of the Wisconsin Senate from the 1st district
- In office January 6, 1947 – January 3, 1955
- Preceded by: John E. Cashman
- Succeeded by: Alfred A. Laun Jr.

Personal details
- Born: January 4, 1901 Two Rivers, Wisconsin
- Died: March 20, 1961 (aged 60) Two Rivers, Wisconsin
- Party: Progressive; Union Party; Republican
- Profession: Commercial fisherman

Everett F. "Butch" LaFond (January 4, 1901 – March 20, 1961) was an American commercial fisherman and politician from Two Rivers, Wisconsin.

== Background ==
LaFond was born January 4, 1901, son of Henry and Minnie (Krueger) LaFond, in Two Rivers, where his ancestors had been commercial fishers since 1848. He attended St. Luke's parochial school, and Washington High School. He was a World War I veteran, having served in the Navy on Atlantic Ocean minesweepers. He was discharged in 1919 (he would be active with the American Legion and the Veterans of Foreign Wars, serving as commander of the local VFW Post 1248), and went into the family business, the Lafond Fish Company.

== Fishing business ==
LaFond was a vehement and outspoken advocate of the interests of the commercial fishing industry, and frequently came into conflict with conservation forces in Wisconsin. He was the founding secretary of the Wisconsin Federation of Commercial Fishermen when it was founded in 1927 at Two Rivers. By 1930, in coordination with his father Captain Henry LaFond, he was challenging the new state restrictions on the size of the mesh in fishing nets, claiming the state's new regulations would harm fisheries in Lake Michigan. He would continue to disagree with state wildlife and conservation forces for decades to come, culminating in several cases where he was involved in violent clashes. In 1935, he got into a fistfight in the hallways of the Wisconsin State Capitol with another commercial fisherman who supported proposed state regulations. One of a series of clashes between groups including LeFond and his family and state conservation watercraft sent two state conservation wardens to the hospital.

On December 2, 1947, now-Senator LaFond and two fellow fisherman (one of them Assemblyman Frank Le Clair) got into another clash with conservation wardens, and were charged with preventing the wardens from seizing evidence of violations of fishing laws. He was convicted of "resisting and obstructing conservation wardens in the performance of their duties," in part because of witness testimony that he told members of a mob gathered on the dock "Come on, boys, let's take 'em!"

== Public office ==
He was a member of the Two Rivers city council in 1934. In the mid-1930s, LaFond (who had been regarded as a leading member of the Wisconsin Progressive Party in the area, broke with the Progressives over commercial fishing regulations, and became identified with the populist Union Party. After flirting with a run against Governor Philip La Follette in 1938, he instead ran on the Union ticket for Wisconsin's 1st State Senate district (Door, Kewaunee and Manitowoc counties) to replace retiring Progressive John Cashman. He drew only 1334 votes, to 10,130 for Democrat Francis A. Yindra, 8,515 for Progressive George W. Kiel, and 8,413 for Republican Fred Borcherdt. He served on the Two Rivers school board from 1940 to 1943, and was a member of the Manitowoc County Board of Supervisors from 1934 to 1947.

In 1946, Cashman (who had returned to the Senate's 1st District) died in office. LaFond, running now as a Republican, won a substantial plurality in a six-way primary election, and was unopposed in the general election. He was assigned to the standing committee on highways. At the start of the new legislative session, LaFond announced a plan to take control of net fishing away from the state conservation commission and return it to legislative control.
