= Jerome Martin =

American politician, legislator, and businessman

Jerome A. Martin

Member of the Wisconsin Senate from the 1st district
- In office January 4, 1971 – January 27, 1977
- Preceded by: Alex Meunier
- Succeeded by: Alan Lasee

Personal details
- Born: September 24, 1908 Rockland, Brown County, Wisconsin, U.S.
- Died: January 27, 1977 (aged 68) Madison, Wisconsin, U.S.
- Party: Democratic

Jerome Martin (September 24, 1908 – January 27, 1977) was a Wisconsin politician, legislator, and businessman. From 1971 until his death, Martin served in the Wisconsin State Senate.

Martin was born in Rockland, Wisconsin, on September 24, 1908. He attended St. Norbert College for two years. He worked as a businessman, bank director, and oil jobber. In the late 1950s, Martin became active in local politics. He was elected to the Brown County Board of Supervisors from 1958; he served as board chairperson from 1962 to 1970. He was elected as President of the village of Whitelaw, Wisconsin in 1969, serving until 1971. Martin was elected to the Wisconsin State Senate in 1970, where he served until his death on January 27, 1977. Martin died of a heart attack in his sleep in Madison, Wisconsin.
