= Alex Meunier =

20th century American politician

Member of the Wisconsin Senate from the 1st district
- In office January 7, 1963 – January 4, 1971
- Preceded by: Alfred A. Laun Jr.
- Succeeded by: Jerome Martin

Member of the Wisconsin State Assembly from the Door County district
- In office January 4, 1943 – January 3, 1949
- Preceded by: Frank N. Graass
- Succeeded by: Hallie H. Rowe

Personal details
- Born: November 9, 1897 Brussels, Wisconsin, U.S.
- Died: November 8, 1983 (aged 85) Door County, Wisconsin, U.S.
- Resting place: Bayside Cemetery, Sturgeon Bay, Wisconsin
- Party: Republican
- Spouse: Mabel Larson
- Education: Algoma Teachers College
- Profession: Teacher

Military service
- Allegiance: United States
- Branch/service: United States Army
- Years of service: 1918

Alex J. Meunier (November 9, 1897 – November 8, 1983) was an American educator and Republican politician. He served eight years in the Wisconsin State Senate and six years in the State Assembly, representing Door County and northeastern Wisconsin.

== Biography ==
Meunier attended the Algoma Teachers College, and taught in Door County schools for nine years. He also served in the U.S. Army, and operated his own orchard. He was a delegate to the Republican National Convention in 1943, and 1949. He died at a hospital in 1983.

Wisconsin State Assembly
Preceded by Frank N. Graass	Member of the Wisconsin State Assembly from the Door district January 4, 1943 – January 3, 1949	Succeeded by Hallie H. Rowe
Wisconsin Senate
Preceded by Alfred A. Laun Jr.	Member of the Wisconsin Senate from the 1st district January 7, 1963 – January 4, 1971	Succeeded by Jerome Martin
