= John E. Cashman =

20th century American politician

Member of the Wisconsin Senate from the 1st district
- In office January 6, 1941 – June 4, 1946
- Preceded by: Francis A. Yindra
- Succeeded by: Everett F. LaFond
- In office January 1, 1923 – January 2, 1939
- Preceded by: Herbert Peterson
- Succeeded by: Francis A. Yindra

Personal details
- Born: November 18, 1865 Franklin, Kewaunee County, Wisconsin, U.S.
- Died: June 4, 1946 (aged 80) Manitowoc, Wisconsin, U.S.
- Resting place: Saint James Cemetery, Cooperstown, Wisconsin
- Party: Progressive (1934–1946); Republican (before 1934)
- Spouses: Sophie Marie Duaime (died 1907); Elizabeth Kelly (m. 1923–1946)
- Children: John Elzear Cashman^{(b. 1897; died 1897)}; John Edward Cashman^{(b. 1898; died 1899)}; Mary Josephine Cashman^{(b. 1900; died 1902)}; John Richard Cashman^{(b. 1906; died 1969)}
- Education: Valparaiso University; Chicago Law School
- Occupation: Farmer

John Edward Cashman (November 18, 1865 – June 4, 1946) was an American farmer and progressive Republican politician from Manitowoc County, Wisconsin. He was a member of the Wisconsin Senate for 22 years, representing Wisconsin's 1st Senate district.

== Early life and education ==
Cashman was born in Franklin, Kewaunee County, Wisconsin. He attended Valparaiso University and the University of Chicago Law School.

== Career ==
Cashman was a member of the Wisconsin State Senate from 1923 to 1938 and again from 1941 to 1946. He was also a delegate to the 1924 Republican National Convention. Cashman was twice a Democratic candidate for the United States House of Representatives from Wisconsin's 8th congressional district, losing to incumbent George J. Schneider in 1936 and to Joshua L. Johns in 1938. He was also affiliated with the Wisconsin Progressive Party.

He died in office in 1946.
