= Melvin W. and Mary Perry House =

Historic house in Wisconsin, United States

- U.S. National Register of Historic Places
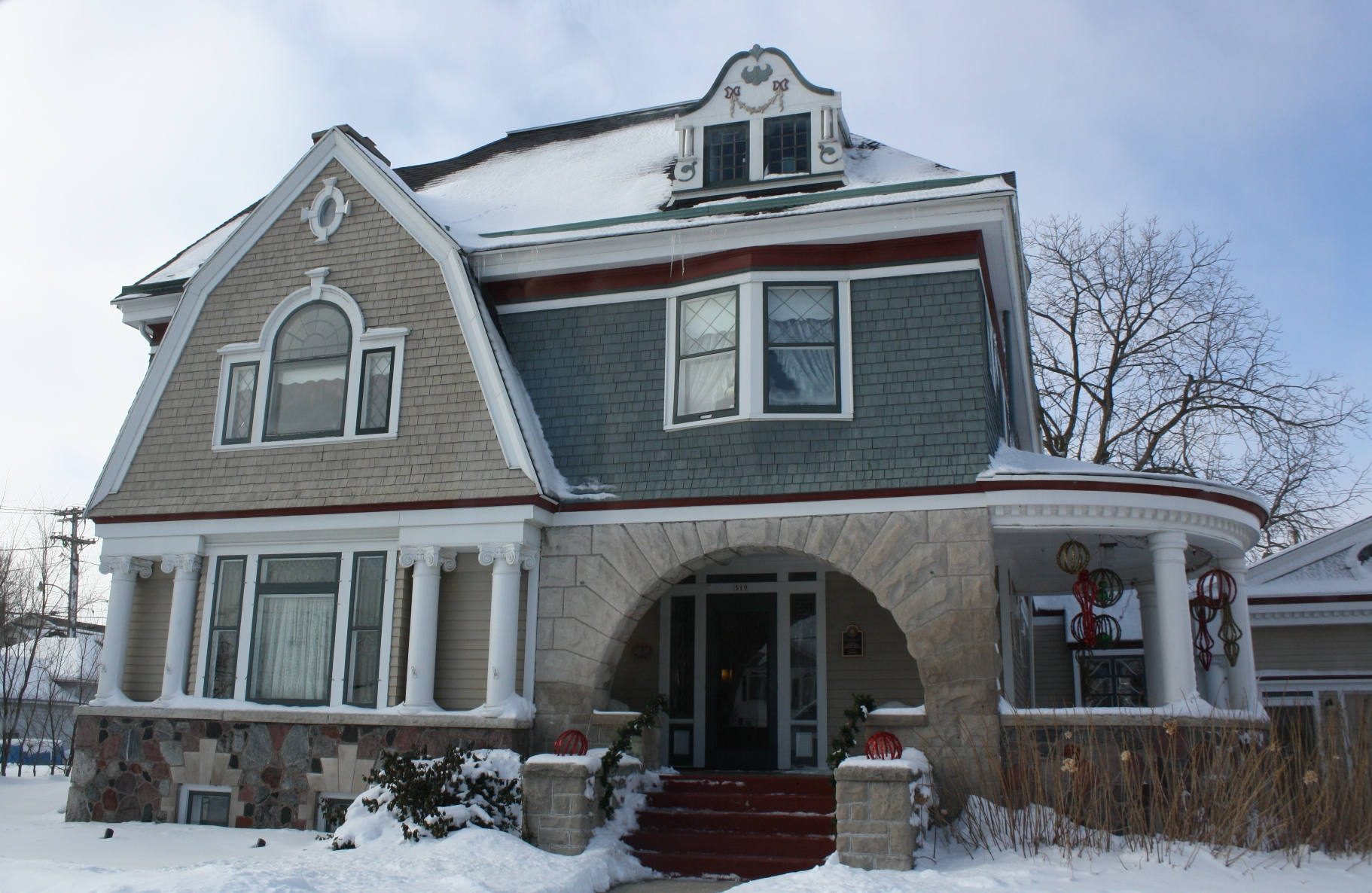

- Location within Wisconsin Location within the United States
- Location: 519 3rd St. Algoma, Wisconsin
- Coordinates: 44°36′29″N 87°26′15″W
- Area: less than one acre
- Built: 1909; 117 years ago
- Architect: Wallace W. De Long
- Architectural style: Colonial Revival/Shingle Style
- NRHP reference No.: 07001461
- Added to NRHP: January 23, 2008; 18 years ago

The Melvin W. and Mary Perry House is a historic house located at 519 Third Street in Algoma, Wisconsin. It is historically significant for its association with the life of Melvin W. Perry.

== Description and history ==
The Shingle Style house was built for M. W. Perry, who was Mayor of Algoma and a member of the Wisconsin State Senate. He lived in it from the time of its completion until his death in 1951. It was added to the National Register of Historic Places on January 23, 2008.
