= Alan Lasee =

American politician (born 1937)

President of the Wisconsin Senate
- In office January 6, 2003 – January 8, 2007
- Preceded by: Fred Risser
- Succeeded by: Fred Risser

Member of the Wisconsin Senate from the 1st district
- In office May 12, 1977 – January 3, 2011
- Preceded by: Jerome Martin
- Succeeded by: Frank Lasee

Member of the Wisconsin State Assembly from the 3rd district
- In office January 6, 1975 – January 3, 1977
- Preceded by: Everett E. Bolle
- Succeeded by: Daniel Fischer

Personal details
- Born: July 30, 1937 (age 88) Rockland, Brown County, Wisconsin, U.S.
- Party: Republican
- Relatives: Frank Lasee (cousin)
- Profession: Farmer

Alan J. Lasee (born July 30, 1937) is a retired American dairy farmer and Republican politician from Brown County, Wisconsin. He served nearly 34 years in the Wisconsin Senate, representing Wisconsin's 1st Senate district from 1977 to 2001; through his long career in the Senate, he served in several caucus leadership positions, culminating in his service as president of the Senate for the 96th and 97th Wisconsin legislatures (2003–2007). Before being elected to the Senate, he served one term in the Wisconsin State Assembly.

His successor in his Senate seat, Frank Lasee, is his first cousin.

== Biography ==
Lasee was born in the town of Rockland, Brown County, Wisconsin, and attended St. Norbert High School. He is married and has six children. He is a former dairy farmer and member of many Brown County organizations. He also raises exotic animals including llamas, camels, miniature donkeys, and fainting goats.

Lasee was elected to the Wisconsin State Assembly in 1974 and to the Wisconsin Senate in 1977 in a special election (following the death of then-senator Jerome Martin). He was the Minority caucus chairperson in 1979, 1981 and 1987. He then was President Pro Tempore in 1993 and 1995. He became president of the senate in 2003 and in 2005.

Alan Lasee sat on the committee on Campaign Finance Reform and Ethics, the Committee on State and Federal Relations, and co-chairs both the Joint committee on Employment Relations and the Joint committee on Legislative Organization. Throughout his legislative career, he tried to bring back the death penalty to Wisconsin, but was ultimately unsuccessful. On January 11, 2010, Senator Lasee announced his retirement from the Wisconsin Legislature. Alan's younger cousin, Frank Lasee, won this open seat in the November 2010 election.

Wisconsin State Assembly
Preceded by Everett E. Bolle	Member of the Wisconsin State Assembly from the 3rd district January 6, 1975 – January 3, 1977	Succeeded by Daniel Fischer
Wisconsin Senate
Preceded by Jerome Martin	Member of the Wisconsin Senate from the 1st district May 12, 1977 – January 3, 2011	Succeeded by Frank Lasee
Preceded by Fred Risser	President of the Wisconsin Senate; January 6, 2003 – January 8, 2007	Succeeded by Fred Risser
