= John Fetzer (politician) =

19th century American politician

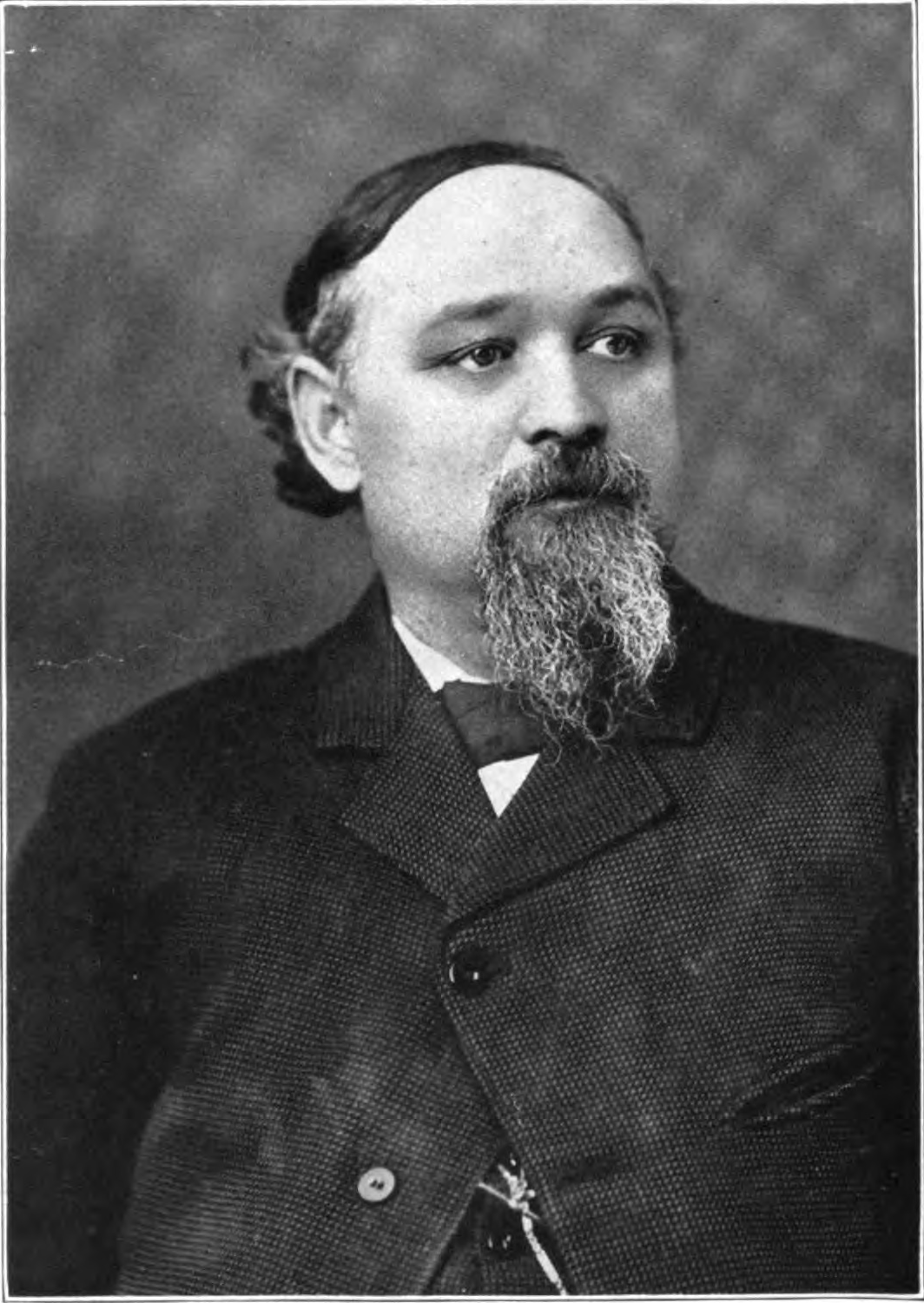
- From Door County, Wisconsin, the County Beautiful, Vol. 1 (1917)

Member of the Wisconsin Senate from the 1st district
- In office February 4, 1891 – January 7, 1895
- Preceded by: Edward Scofield
- Succeeded by: De Wayne Stebbins

Member of the Wisconsin State Assembly from the Door district
- In office January 5, 1885 – January 3, 1887
- Preceded by: Christopher Leonhardt
- Succeeded by: Gustaf Dreutzer

Personal details
- Born: July 8, 1840 Grand Duchy of Hesse
- Died: May 2, 1900 (aged 59) Iron River, Michigan, U.S.
- Resting place: Bayside Cemetery, Sturgeon Bay, Wisconsin
- Party: Democratic
- Spouse: Anna Fetzer (m. 1866–1900)
- Children: none
- Profession: Merchant

Military service
- Allegiance: United States
- Branch/service: United States Volunteers
- Years of service: 1861–1864
- Rank: Corporal, USV; Brevet Captain, USV
- Unit: 9th Reg. Wis. Vol. Infantry
- Battles/wars: American Civil War: Operations to Control Indian Territory; Red River campaign; Battle of Mansfield; Battle of Jenkins' Ferry (WIA)

John Fetzer (July 8, 1840 – May 2, 1900) was a German American immigrant, merchant, and Democratic politician. He was a member of the Wisconsin State Senate, representing Door, Marinette, and Oconto counties during the 1891 and 1893 sessions. He also represented Door County in the State Assembly in 1885 and served in the Union Army during the American Civil War.

== Early life ==
Fetzer was born on July 8, 1840, in the Grand Duchy of Hessen, in present-day Germany. As a child, he emigrated to the United States with his parents aboard the ship Edwina, arriving at the harbor of New York City. They immediately went west to Albany, New York, then to Buffalo, where they took a boat through the Great Lakes to Wisconsin. They arrived at the port of Manitowoc, Wisconsin, in June 1850, a month after landing at New York City.

At Manitowoc, they purchased a farm. Fetzer's father, Peter Fetzer, had significant wealth and brought five employees from Germany to build and maintain the homestead. Their home was described as the first frame house and first barn to be constructed in Manitowoc County. They made several trips down to Milwaukee to bring cattle to the settlement in Manitowoc, where they then sold the cattle in exchange for farm labor from the other settlers.

John Fetzer attended the high school in Manitowoc for one year, then went to work on his father's farm until the outbreak of the American Civil War.

== Civil War service ==
In June 1861, Fetzer responded to the call for 300,000 volunteers for the Union Army and was enrolled as a private in Company B of the 9th Wisconsin Infantry Regiment. The 9th Wisconsin Infantry was composed mainly of German-speaking immigrants. The regiment left the state in January 1862 and went on to serve in the trans-Mississippi theater of the war. They engaged in operations in Kansas, Arkansas, and Indian Territory. Fetzer served three years and was promoted to corporal. In the Red River campaign, at the Battle of Mansfield, he was given an informal battlefield commission as captain, but was wounded a few weeks later at the Battle of Jenkins' Ferry. He received a gunshot wound to the right breast and arm, and, after some time in the hospital, he was sent back to Manitowoc until the end of his three-year term. In April 1866, his informal battlefield commission as captain was made an official brevet commission by Governor Lucius Fairchild.

== Postbellum years ==
In April 1867, Fetzer moved further north to Ahnapee, Wisconsin, in Kewaunee County, where he established a foundry and machine shop. He operated it for only one season, however, and then sold and moved to the town of Forestville, in Door County. In Door County, he purchased a farm, which remained his primary residence for the rest of his life. He also set up a general merchandise store and, in 1872, he also established a sawmill, soon growing to employ fifty laborers. He operated the sawmill until 1878, and then became a larger investor in the lumber business. Through his firm Young & Fetzer, he profited from lumber manufacturing at sites around Door County. He also established an extensive flour mill on the Ahnapee River in 1877, and expanded and modernized the facility over the next decade.

== Political career ==
Fetzer's grave (left) at Bayside Cemetery

He was a prominent member of the Democratic Party of Wisconsin in northeast Wisconsin, and was elected chairman of the town board of Forestville in 1868, the year after he arrived there. He held that office for 27 of the next 28 years. He was also elected to at least 20 terms on the county board of supervisors and was chairman of the county board for three years. He was appointed postmaster at Forestville in 1880 and served in that role through 1889, but was subsequently re-appointed in 1894.

He was elected to the Wisconsin State Assembly in 1884, to represent the Door County district. He narrowly defeated his Republican opponent in the swing district, which frequently swung between Republican and Democratic representatives. He did not run for re-election in 1886, but ran for Wisconsin State Senate in 1890. The 1890 election was a Democratic wave year, assisted by the backlash against the anti-immigrant Bennett Law, which had been passed in 1889. Fetzer however, initially appeared to have been narrowly defeated by Republican incumbent Edward Scofield. Fetzer challenged the results through the Senate Committee on Privileges and Elections. After a few weeks of testimony, the Democratic majority ruled in his favor and awarded him the seat in early February 1891.

Fetzer did not run for re-election in 1894, and continue his business interests. He died on May 2, 1900, at Iron River, Michigan. He was buried at Bayside Cemetery in Sturgeon Bay, Wisconsin.

== Personal life and family ==
John Fetzer was the eldest of five children born to Peter Fetzer and his wife Margaret (née Pitz). Peter Fetzer had been a successful merchant in Hesse before emigrating to the United States. He formally became an American citizen on September 22, 1856, about six years after his arrival in the country.

John's younger brother, Jacob, also enlisted in the Union Army during the Civil War and acted as a scout for the 1st Wisconsin Heavy Artillery Regiment. He died in Louisiana after the war.

John Fetzer married Anna Fetzer in 1866. Anna was also a native of Hesse, and was possibly a cousin. They had no known children.

== Electoral history ==
=== Wisconsin Assembly (1884) ===
Wisconsin Assembly, Door District Election, 1884
Party	Candidate	Votes	%	±%
General Election, November 4, 1884
Democratic	John Fetzer	1,541	50.69%	
Republican	George Bassford	1,499	49.31%	−0.81%
Plurality		42	1.38%	+1.15%
Total votes		3,040	100.0%	+43.19%
Democratic gain from Republican				

=== Wisconsin Senate (1890) ===
Wisconsin Senate, 1st District Election, 1890
Party	Candidate	Votes	%	±%
General Election, November 4, 1890 (after challenges)
Democratic	John Fetzer	3,304	50.11%	+1.18%
Republican	Edward Scofield (incumbent)	3,289	49.89%	
Plurality		15	0.23%	-1.91%
Total votes		6,593	100.0%	-45.49%
Democratic gain from Republican				

Wisconsin State Assembly
Preceded by Christopher Leonhardt	Member of the Wisconsin State Assembly from the Door district January 5, 1885 – January 3, 1887	Succeeded by Gustaf Dreutzer
Wisconsin Senate
Preceded by Edward Scofield	Member of the Wisconsin Senate from the 1st district January 5, 1891 – January 7, 1895	Succeeded by De Wayne Stebbins
