= Alfred A. Laun Jr. =

American politician (1905–1964)

Member of the Wisconsin Senate from the 1st district
- In office January 3, 1955 – January 7, 1963
- Preceded by: Everett F. LaFond
- Succeeded by: Alex Meunier

Personal details
- Born: February 14, 1905 New Holstein, Wisconsin
- Died: November 4, 1964 (aged 59)
- Party: Republican

Alfred Albert Laun Jr. (February 14, 1905 in New Holstein, Wisconsin – November 4, 1964), was a member of the Wisconsin State Senate. He attended Oberlin College before graduating cum laude from Harvard University.

== Career ==
Laun was elected to the Senate in 1954 and was re-elected in 1958. He was a delegate to the 1956 Republican National Convention. In addition, he was a presidential elector that year.
