= Harlan P. Bird =

American politician (1838–1912)

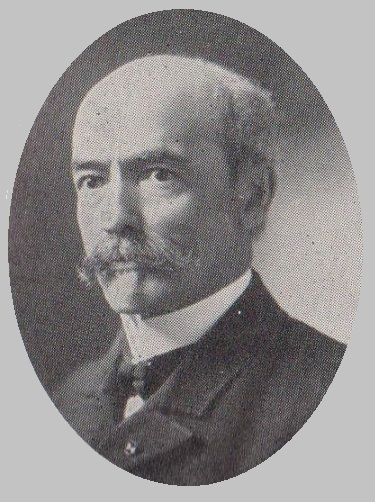

Member of the Wisconsin Senate from the 1st district
- In office January 5, 1903 – January 2, 1911
- Preceded by: De Wayne Stebbins
- Succeeded by: Herbert Peterson

Personal details
- Born: August 2, 1838 Bradford County, Pennsylvania, U.S.
- Died: November 24, 1912 (aged 74) Wausaukee, Wisconsin, U.S.
- Cause of death: Stroke
- Resting place: Woodlawn Cemetery, Marinette, Wisconsin
- Party: Republican
- Spouses: Sara Jane Fairchild (m. 1869; died 1904); Laura D. Lamon (Mott) (m. 1906–1912)
- Children: Harry Lewis Bird^{(b. 1870; died 1923)}; Laura Edith (Dunham)^{(b. 1874; died 1951)}; Clarence Weston Bird^{(b. 1880; died 1935)}
- Profession: Accountant, merchant, banker

Military service
- Allegiance: United States
- Branch/service: United States Volunteers; Union Army
- Years of service: 1861–1865
- Rank: 1st Lieutenant, USV
- Unit: 12th Reg. Wis. Vol. Infantry
- Battles/wars: American Civil War

Harlan Page Bird (August 2, 1838 – November 24, 1912) was an American businessman and Republican politician. He served 8 years in the Wisconsin State Senate, representing northeast Wisconsin.

== Biography ==
Harlan Page Bird was born on August 2, 1838, in Bradford County, Pennsylvania. He was educated in public schools, and in his early life engaged in school teaching, land surveying, and bookkeeping.

He left his father's homestead in 1858 and was employed for two years as an accountant for a contractor constructing a water pumping project in Brooklyn, New York. On the completion of this project in 1860, Page was employed by the same company for their lumber operations in northern Wisconsin, and went to live at Menekaunee.

== Civil War service ==
At the outbreak of the American Civil War, he enlisted with the Union Army and was enrolled in Company F of the 12th Wisconsin Infantry Regiment. The 12th Wisconsin Infantry mustered into federal service in October 1861 and proceeded to Missouri for service in the western theater of the war. After the first year, he was promoted to sergeant major of the regiment, but served only a few months before being commissioned second lieutenant of Company G.

He was wounded while on the picket line at the Siege of Vicksburg, but was able to return to duty after just two months of recuperation. After which, he was detailed to work as assistant adjutant for the brigade, and was then assistant quartermaster of the XVII Corps. He was promoted to first lieutenant effective August 17, 1864, and went on to work as ordinance officer for the 3rd division of XVII Corps. He mustered out of the service with his regiment on July 16, 1865.

== Postbellum career ==
After returning from the war, he returned to his duties for the Menominee River Lumber Co. and worked for several years as accountant and general assistant. In 1871 he opened a merchandising business across the border in Menominee, Michigan. In 1877 he ran into financial problems due to an investment in the construction of a mill in Stephenson, Michigan, and opted to relocate there to see to the successful completion and operation of the mill. He subsequently leased the mill and returned to Menominee and was heavily involved with lumber companies and other improvements on both the Wisconsin and Michigan sides of the Menominee River.

In 1892, he was placed in charge of the post office at Wausaukee, Wisconsin, due to financial irregularities under the previous postmaster.

In 1902 he was elected to the Wisconsin State Senate from Wisconsin's 1st State Senate district, running on the Republican Party ticket. He was re-elected in 1906 but suffered a stroke in 1910 and did not run for a third term.

He was in poor health following his stroke and remained in a feeble condition for the last two years of his life. He suffered subsequent strokes and died at his home in Wausaukee on November 24, 1912.

== Personal life and family ==
Harlan P. Bird married twice. He first married Sarah Jane Fairchild in 1869. Sarah was the daughter of Marinette minister John Fairchild and the sister of state representative Hiram Orlando Fairchild. They were married 35 years and had three children before her death in 1904. He subsequently married Laura D. Mott (née Lamon), the widow of Harry Mott, in 1906. His second wife survived him.

== Electoral history ==
=== Wisconsin Senate (1902, 1906) ===
Wisconsin Senate, 1st District Election, 1902
Party	Candidate	Votes	%	±%
General Election, November 4, 1902
Republican	Harlan P. Bird	6,042	59.25%	−1.94%
Democratic	Charles Metzer	3,948	38.71%	−0.10%
Prohibition	J. J. Sherman	208	2.04%	
Plurality		2,094	20.53%	-1.83%
Total votes		10,198	100.0%	+6.67%
Republican hold				

Wisconsin Senate, 1st District Election, 1906
Party	Candidate	Votes	%	±%
General Election, November 6, 1906
Republican	Harlan P. Bird (incumbent)	4,995	59.92%	+0.67%
Democratic	Leo J. Evans	3,125	37.49%	−1.23%
Social Democratic	James Larson	216	2.59%	
Plurality		1,870	22.43%	+1.90%
Total votes		8,336	100.0%	-18.26%
Republican hold				

Wisconsin Senate
Preceded by De Wayne Stebbins	Member of the Wisconsin Senate from the 1st district January 5, 1903 – January 2, 1911	Succeeded by Herbert Peterson
