= Two Rivers (town), Wisconsin =

Two Rivers, Wisconsin
- Town
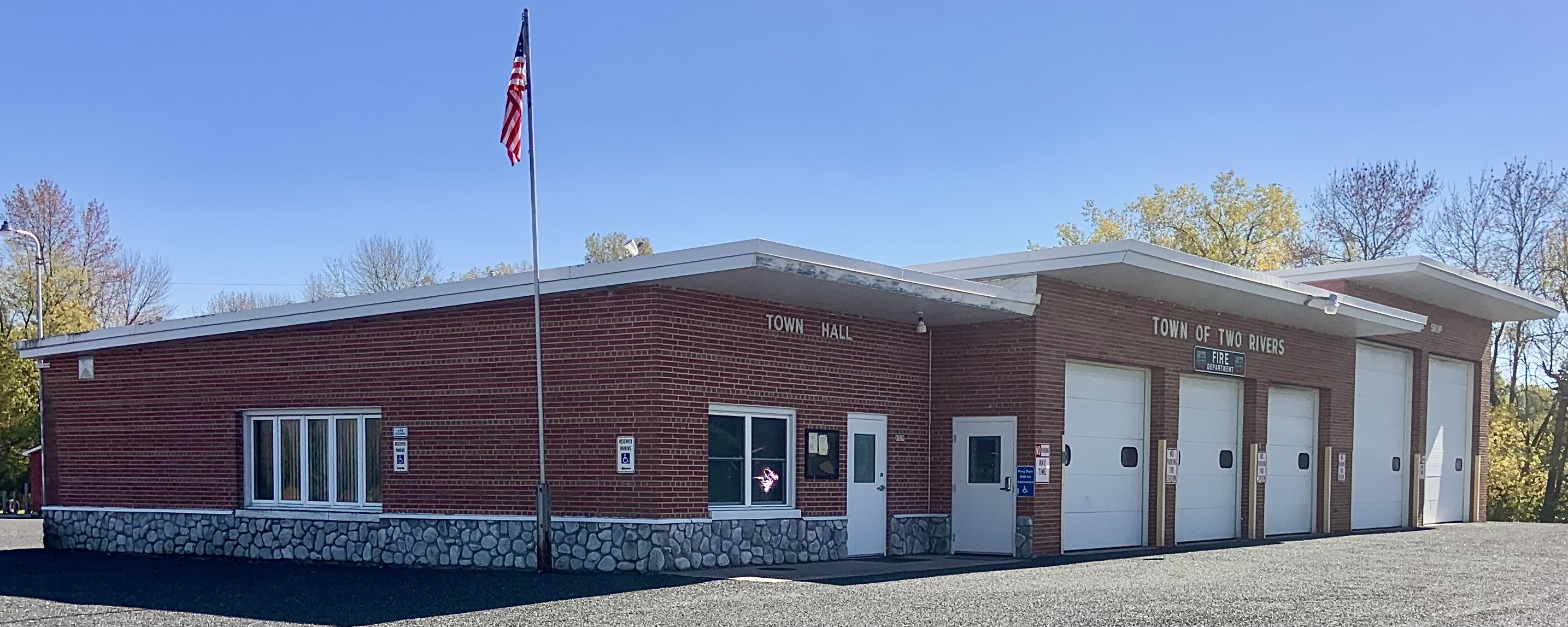
- Town hall

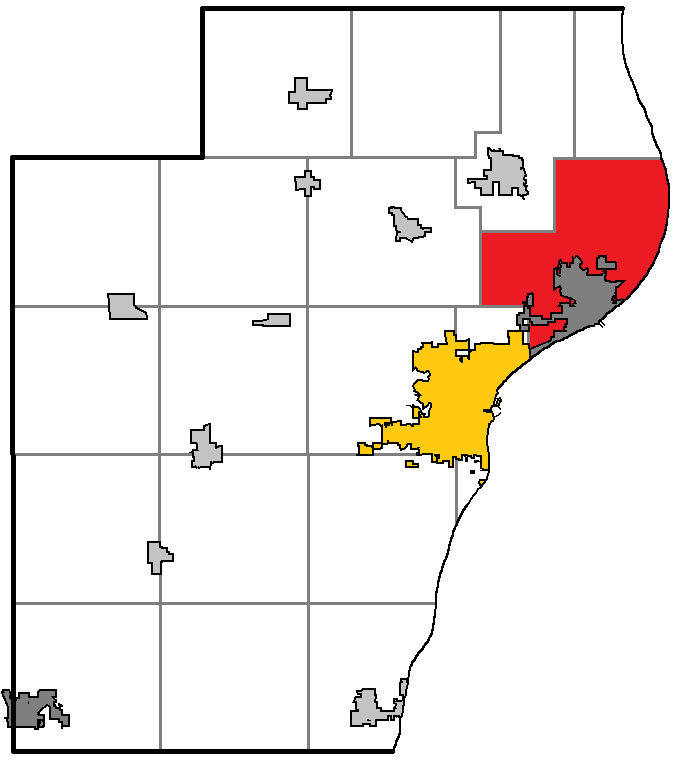
- Location of Two Rivers, within Manitowoc County
- Coordinates: 44°11′16″N 87°35′28″W
- Country: United States
- State: Wisconsin
- County: Manitowoc

Area
  - Total: 31.9 sq mi (82.6 km^{2})
  - Land: 31.8 sq mi (82.3 km^{2})
  - Water: 0.12 sq mi (0.3 km^{2})
- Elevation: 620 ft (189 m)

Population (2020)
  - Total: 1,672
  - Density: 52.6/sq mi (20.3/km^{2})
- Time zone: UTC-6 (Central (CST))
  - Summer (DST): UTC-5 (CDT)
- Area code: 920
- FIPS code: 55-81350
- GNIS feature ID: 1584307

Two Rivers is a town in Manitowoc County, Wisconsin, United States. The population was 1,672 at the 2020 census. The City of Two Rivers is located mostly within the town. The unincorporated community of Shoto is also located in the town.

== Geography ==
Shoto Falls on the West Twin River

According to the United States Census Bureau, the town has a total area of 31.9 square miles (82.6 km^{2}), of which 31.8 square miles (82.3 km^{2}) is land and 0.1 square miles (0.3 km^{2}) (0.41%) is water.

== Demographics ==
As of the census of 2000, there were 1,912 people, 734 households, and 584 families residing in the town. The population density was 60.2 people per square mile (23.2/km^{2}). There were 766 housing units at an average density of 24.1 per square mile (9.3/km^{2}). The racial makeup of the town was 98.69% White, 0.05% Black or African American, 0.47% Native American, 0.21% Asian, and 0.58% from two or more races. 0.42% of the population were Hispanic or Latino of any race.

There were 734 households, out of which 28.5% had children under the age of 18 living with them, 72.3% were married couples living together, 3.3% had a female householder with no husband present, and 20.4% were non-families. 17.3% of all households were made up of individuals, and 6.5% had someone living alone who was 65 years of age or older. The average household size was 2.57 and the average family size was 2.90.

In the town, the population was spread out, with 21.7% under the age of 18, 6.9% from 18 to 24, 26.2% from 25 to 44, 32.4% from 45 to 64, and 13.0% who were 65 years of age or older. The median age was 43 years. For every 100 females, there were 108.5 males. For every 100 females age 18 and over, there were 107.8 males.

The median income for a household in the town was $55,759, and the median income for a family was $60,313. Males had a median income of $38,445 versus $26,824 for females. The per capita income for the town was $25,319. About 1.4% of families and 1.9% of the population were below the poverty line, including 0.5% of those under age 18 and 5.9% of those age 65 or over.
