= Francis A. Yindra =

American politician

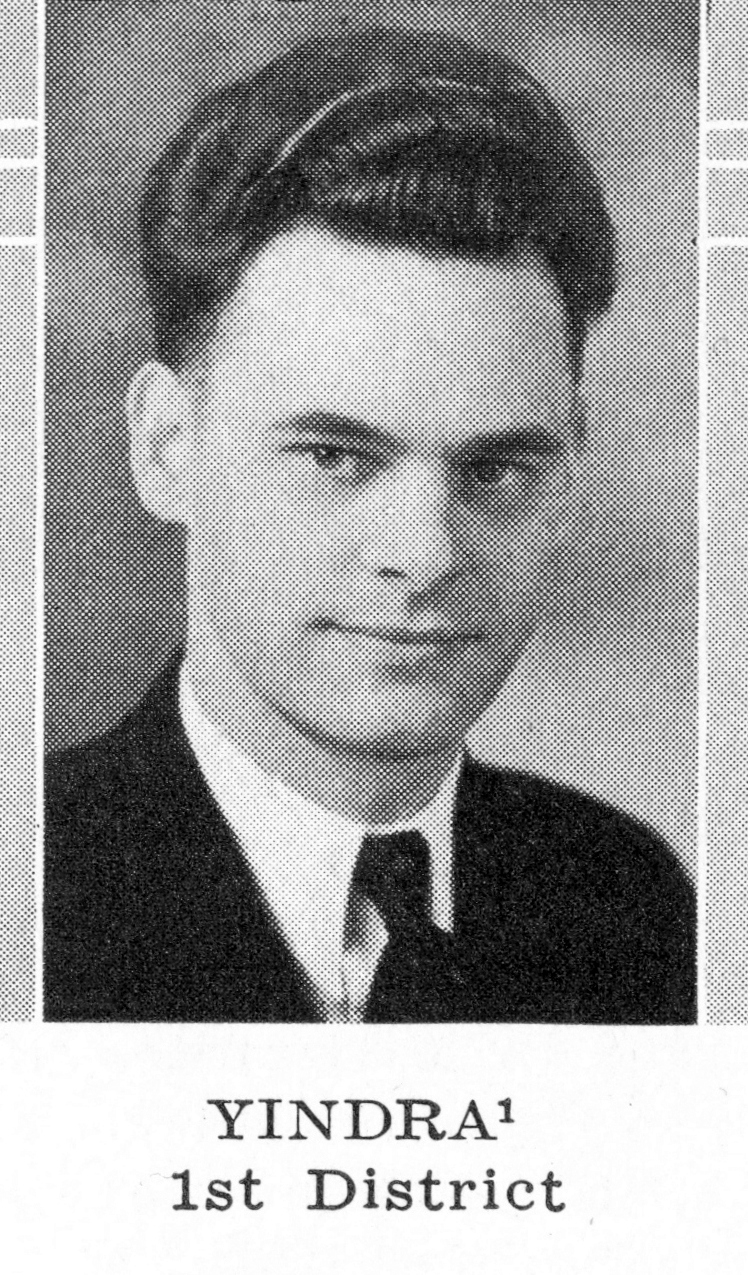

Member of the Wisconsin Senate from the 1st district
- In office 1939–1941
- Preceded by: John E. Cashman
- Succeeded by: John E. Cashman

Member of the Wisconsin State Assembly from the tbd district
- In office 1933–?

Personal details
- Born: January 17, 1906 Manitowoc, Wisconsin
- Died: July 7, 1972 (aged 66) Manitowoc, Wisconsin
- Party: Democratic
- Profession: Attorney

Francis A. Yindra (January 17, 1906 – July 7, 1972) was a member of the Wisconsin State Assembly and the Wisconsin State Senate.

== Biography ==
Yindra was born on January 17, 1906, in Manitowoc, Wisconsin. He graduated from Lincoln High School, Marquette University and Marquette University Law School. Yindra died in July 1972.

== Career ==
Yindra was a member of the assembly in 1933 and 1937 and of the Senate in 1939. Previously, he was an unsuccessful candidate for the Senate in 1922. He was a Democrat.
