= USS Fearnot =

Cargo ship of the United States Navy

History

United States
- Launched: 20 July 1861
- Commissioned: 28 August 1861
- Decommissioned: 18 July 1866
- Fate: Sold, 3 October 1866

General characteristics
- Displacement: 1,012 tons
- Length: 178 ft (54 m)
- Beam: 35 ft (11 m)
- Draft: 23 ft 6 in (7.16 m)
- Armament: 6 × 32-pounder (rifled) guns

USS Fearnot was purchased by the Union Navy for service during the American Civil War. She was assigned to blockade duty for which she was prepared with her powerful rifled guns. The Navy sold her in October 1866.

== Service history ==
Fearnot was built by George W. Jackman Jr., Newburyport, Massachusetts; purchased by the Union Navy 20 July 1861; and commissioned 28 August 1861, Acting Master E. H. Faucon in command. From the time of her arrival at Key West, Florida, 17 September 1861, Fearnot served as coal and supply ship for the West Gulf Blockading Squadron, sailing out of Key West, Florida, to Ship Island, and after its fall, New Orleans, Louisiana. Her last service, from October 1865 to May 1866, was in carrying surplus ordnance to Pensacola, Florida, and guarding the large amounts of ammunition accumulating there. She arrived at Boston, Massachusetts, 29 May 1866, and there was decommissioned 18 July 1866 and sold 3 October 1866.
