= Gideon Winans Allen =

American politician

Gideon Winans Allen (March 28, 1835 – February 28, 1912), was a member of the Wisconsin State Assembly.

== Biography ==
Gideon Winans Allen was born in New London Township, Ohio on March 28, 1835. He moved to Trempealeau, Wisconsin in 1856 and to Madison, Wisconsin the following year. Allen graduated from what is now the University of Wisconsin-Madison in 1862 and from the University of Michigan Law School in 1864. After graduating, Allen practiced law in Madison, Sturgeon Bay, Wisconsin, and Carthage, Missouri.

Allen married Annie M. Cox (1840–1895) on May 16, 1865. They had five children.

He died in Sturgeon Bay on February 12, 1912.

== Political career ==
Allen was a member of the Wisconsin Assembly in 1872. He had previously been an unsuccessful candidate in 1869. In addition, Allen was District Attorney of Door County, Wisconsin, City Attorney of Carthage and of Sturgeon Bay and Clerk of the Sturgeon Bay school board. He was a Democrat.
