= Herbert Peterson =

American politician

Herbert L. Peterson
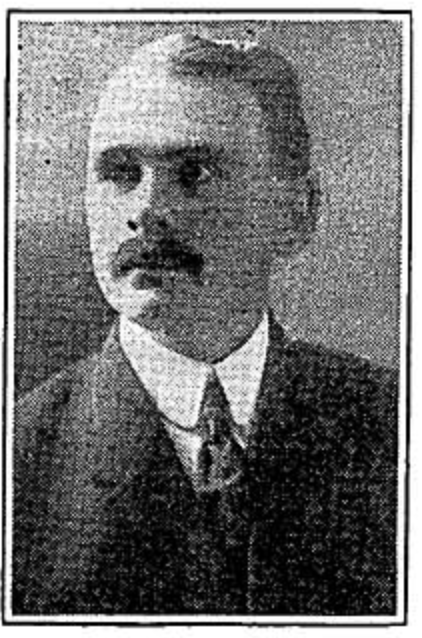

Member of the Wisconsin Senate from the 1st district
- In office January 6, 1919 – January 1, 1923
- Preceded by: M. W. Perry
- Succeeded by: John E. Cashman

Personal details
- Born: May 16, 1876 Door County, Wisconsin
- Died: February 9, 1952 (aged 75) Sturgeon Bay, Wisconsin
- Party: Republican
- Profession: Farmer, merchant,

Herbert L. Peterson (May 16, 1876 - February 9, 1952) was an American banker, businessman and politician. He was a member of the Wisconsin State Senate as a member of the Republican Party of Wisconsin.

== Background ==
Peterson was born on a farm in Door County, Wisconsin. He was the son of Peter and Mary (Mathews) Peterson. His father was born in Norway. He married Phyllis Wright in Minneapolis. After being educated in the public school system, he took a job as a delivery boy and clerk in a general store where he acquired the training which later enabled him to become a senior partner in Peterson & Hoslett, a general store in the community of Sawyer which he partly owned for several years while continuing to live on a farm until 1917.

In 1902, Peterson became vice president of the Bank of Sawyer. In 1914, he became president of the Door County State Bank. He late became the president of the Marinette Hoop and Stave Company. He was also the treasurer of the Universal Shipbuilding Company and president of the Sturgeon Bay Stone Quarry. He continued to own and manage two farms, in addition to his other businesses.

== Public office ==
He held the office of State Senator, representing Wisconsin's 1st Senate District (Door, Kewaunee and Marinette counties) from 1919 to 1923. He carried every county in the Republican primary election in 1918 and was then elected without opposition in the general election.

By the time of the 1922 election, the 1st District had been revised, losing Marinette County and gaining Manitowoc County instead. Peterson was not the Republican nominee in 1922, but was succeeded by fellow Republican John E. Cashman, a Progressive Republican and a staunch supporter of Robert M. La Follette.

== After the Senate ==
In later years, he owned and operated a tourist resort, and an apple and cherry orchard. He died February 9, 1952, after a long illness, survived by his wife and four children.
