= USS Clara Dolsen =

History

United States
- In service: 1862
- Out of service: 1864
- Captured: 14 June 1862
- Fate: Returned to owner, May 1864

General characteristics
- Displacement: 939 tons
- Length: 268 ft (82 m)
- Beam: 42 ft (13 m)
- Draft: 8 ft 9 in (2.67 m)
- Propulsion: steam engine; screw-propelled
- Armament: one 32-pounder gun

USS Clara Dolsen was a large steamer captured by the Union Navy during the American Civil War. She served the Union Navy in river operations and as a "receiving ship" auxiliary.

== Service history ==
Clara Dolsen, a side-wheel steamer, was captured 14 June 1862 by the gunboat USS Mound City and the tug USS Spitfire on the White River during the St. Charles expedition. After taking part in the joint Army-Navy expedition to recapture Henderson, Kentucky, (19–24 July 1862), she served as a receiving ship at Cairo, Illinois, until April 1864. Since she had not been labeled as a prize, her owners brought suit for her return. The final adjudication restored Clara Dolsen to her owners, and she was turned over to the U.S. Marshal for the Southern District of Illinois in May 1864, for delivery to her owners.
