= Rockland, Brown County, Wisconsin =

Rockland, Wisconsin
- Town
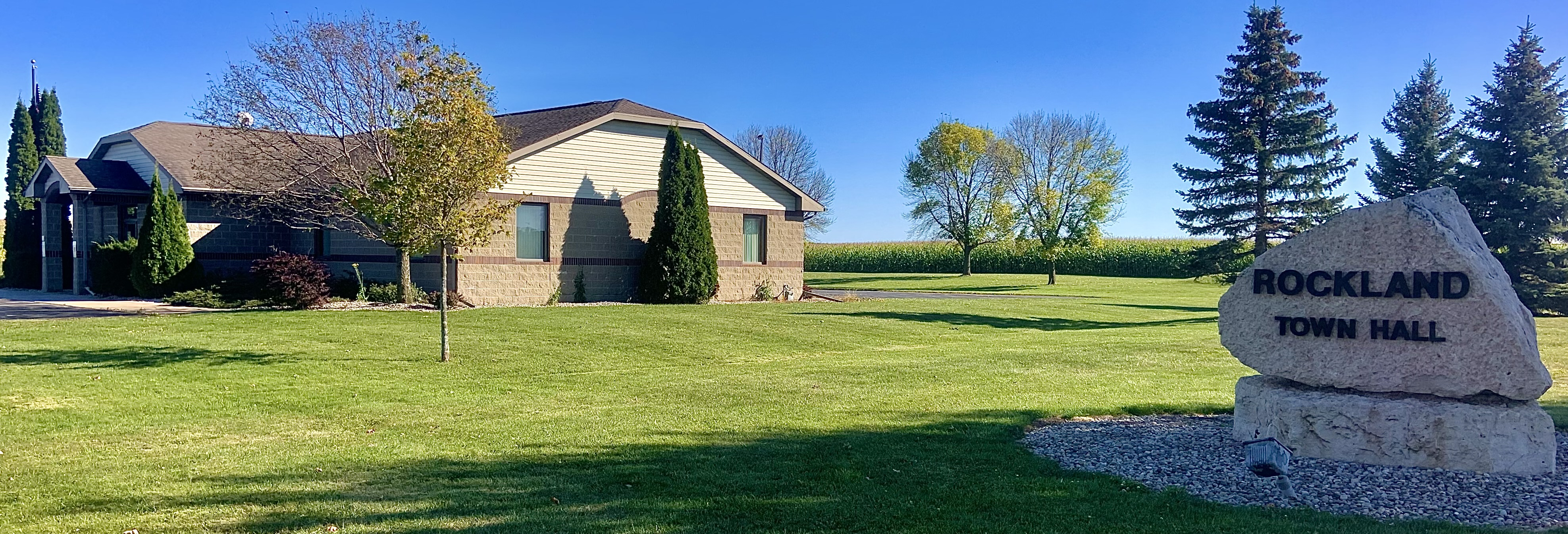
- Rockland town hall

- Location in Brown County and the state of Wisconsin
- Coordinates: 44°22′53″N 88°4′22″W
- Country: United States
- State: Wisconsin
- County: Brown

Area
  - Total: 21.9 sq mi (56.7 km^{2})
  - Land: 21.3 sq mi (55.2 km^{2})
  - Water: 0.54 sq mi (1.4 km^{2})
- Elevation: 719 ft (219 m)

Population (2020)
  - Total: 1,775
  - Density: 83.3/sq mi (32.2/km^{2})
- Time zone: UTC-6 (Central (CST))
  - Summer (DST): UTC-5 (CDT)
- Area code: 920
- FIPS code: 55-68875
- GNIS feature ID: 1584055
- Website: www.rocklandbrownwi.gov

Rockland is a town in Brown County in the U.S. state of Wisconsin. The population was 1,775 at the 2020 census.

== Geography ==
Rockland is located in south-central Brown County and is bordered by the city of De Pere to the north. The Fox River forms the northwestern boundary of the town. Downtown Green Bay is 11 miles (18 km) to the north.

According to the United States Census Bureau, Rockland has a total area of 21.9 square miles (56.7 km^{2}), of which 21.3 square miles (55.2 km^{2}) is land and 0.54 square miles (1.4 km^{2}), or 2.55%, is water.

== Demographics ==
As of the census of 2000, there were 1,522 people, 483 households, and 420 families residing in the town. The population density was 68.2 people per square mile (26.3/km^{2}). There were 495 housing units at an average density of 22.2 per square mile (8.6/km^{2}). The racial makeup of the town was 99.15% White, 0.07% African American, 0.20% Native American, and 0.59% from two or more races. Hispanic or Latino of any race were 0.79% of the population.

There were 483 households, out of which 47.8% had children under the age of 18 living with them, 80.3% were married couples living together, 3.3% had a female householder with no husband present, and 13.0% were non-families. 10.1% of all households were made up of individuals, and 4.3% had someone living alone who was 65 years of age or older. The average household size was 3.15 and the average family size was 3.39.

In the town, the population was spread out, with 32.2% under the age of 18, 6.0% from 18 to 24, 32.7% from 25 to 44, 21.6% from 45 to 64, and 7.5% who were 65 years of age or older. The median age was 35 years. For every 100 females, there were 100.0 males. For every 100 females age 18 and over, there were 104.8 males.

The median income for a household in the town was $69,583, and the median income for a family was $75,129. Males had a median income of $41,953 versus $29,196 for females. The per capita income for the town was $28,484. About 0.7% of families and 1.4% of the population were below the poverty line, including 1.5% of those under age 18 and 2.7% of those age 65 or over.

== Notable people ==
- Alan Lasee, Wisconsin politician
- Jerome Martin, Wisconsin politician
- Joseph Martin, Wisconsin politician
