= Hallie H. Rowe =

American politician (1896–1992)

Hallie H. Rowe (July 3, 1896 – September 28, 1992) was a member of the Wisconsin State Assembly.

== Biography ==
Rowe was born on July 3, 1896, in Weyauwega, Wisconsin. He later moved to Sturgeon Bay, Wisconsin. During World War I, he served in the United States Army.

== Political career ==
Rowe was a member of the Assembly from 1949 to 1950. Previously, he was Sheriff of Door County, Wisconsin from 1945 to 1948. He was a Republican.

Rowe died in Sturgeon Bay on September 28, 1992. He was buried at Bayside Cemetery in Sturgeon Bay.
