= Whitelaw, Wisconsin =

- Village
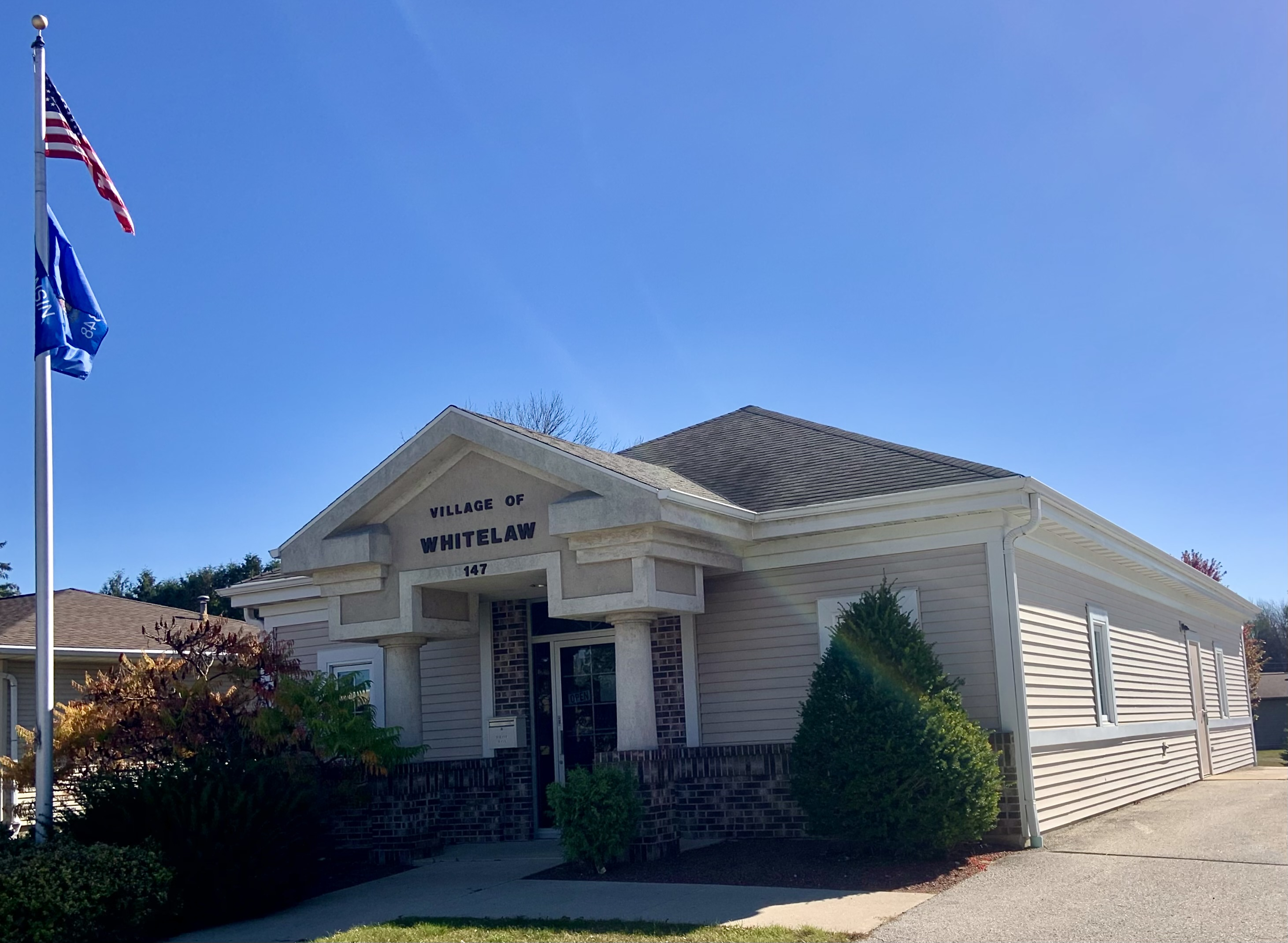
- Whitelaw Village Hall

- Location of Whitelaw in Manitowoc County, Wisconsin
- Coordinates: 44°8′34″N 87°49′39″W
- Country: United States
- State: Wisconsin
- County: Manitowoc

Area
  - Total: 0.53 sq mi (1.37 km^{2})
  - Land: 0.53 sq mi (1.36 km^{2})
  - Water: 0.0039 sq mi (0.01 km^{2})
- Elevation: 856 ft (261 m)

Population (2020)
  - Total: 737
  - Density: 1,408.4/sq mi (543.79/km^{2})
- Time zone: UTC-6 (Central (CST))
  - Summer (DST): UTC-5 (CDT)
- ZIP Code: 54247
- Area code: 920
- FIPS code: 55-86775
- GNIS feature ID: 1576683
- Website: villageofwhitelaw.org

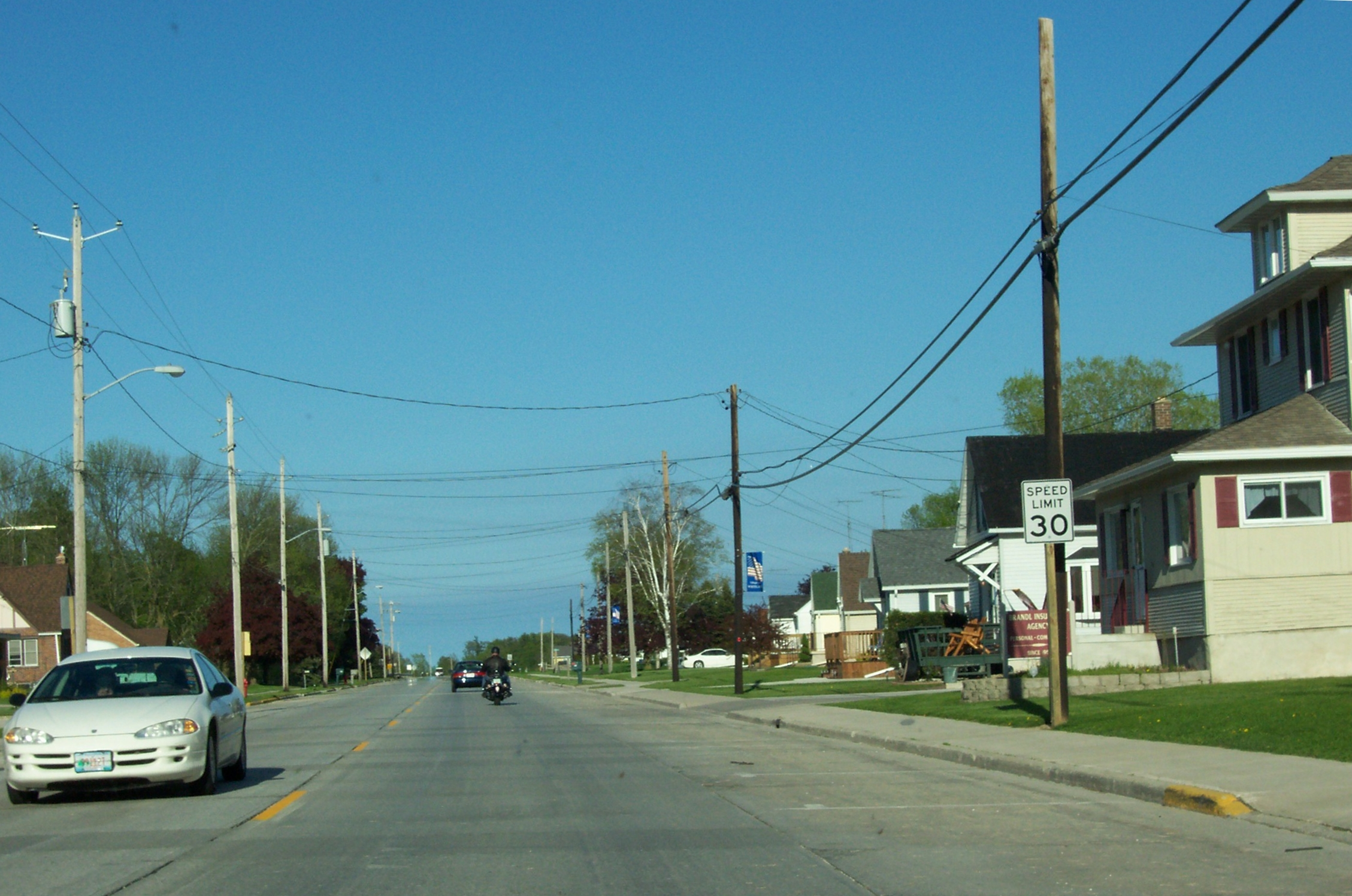
Downtown Whitelaw on U.S. Route 10

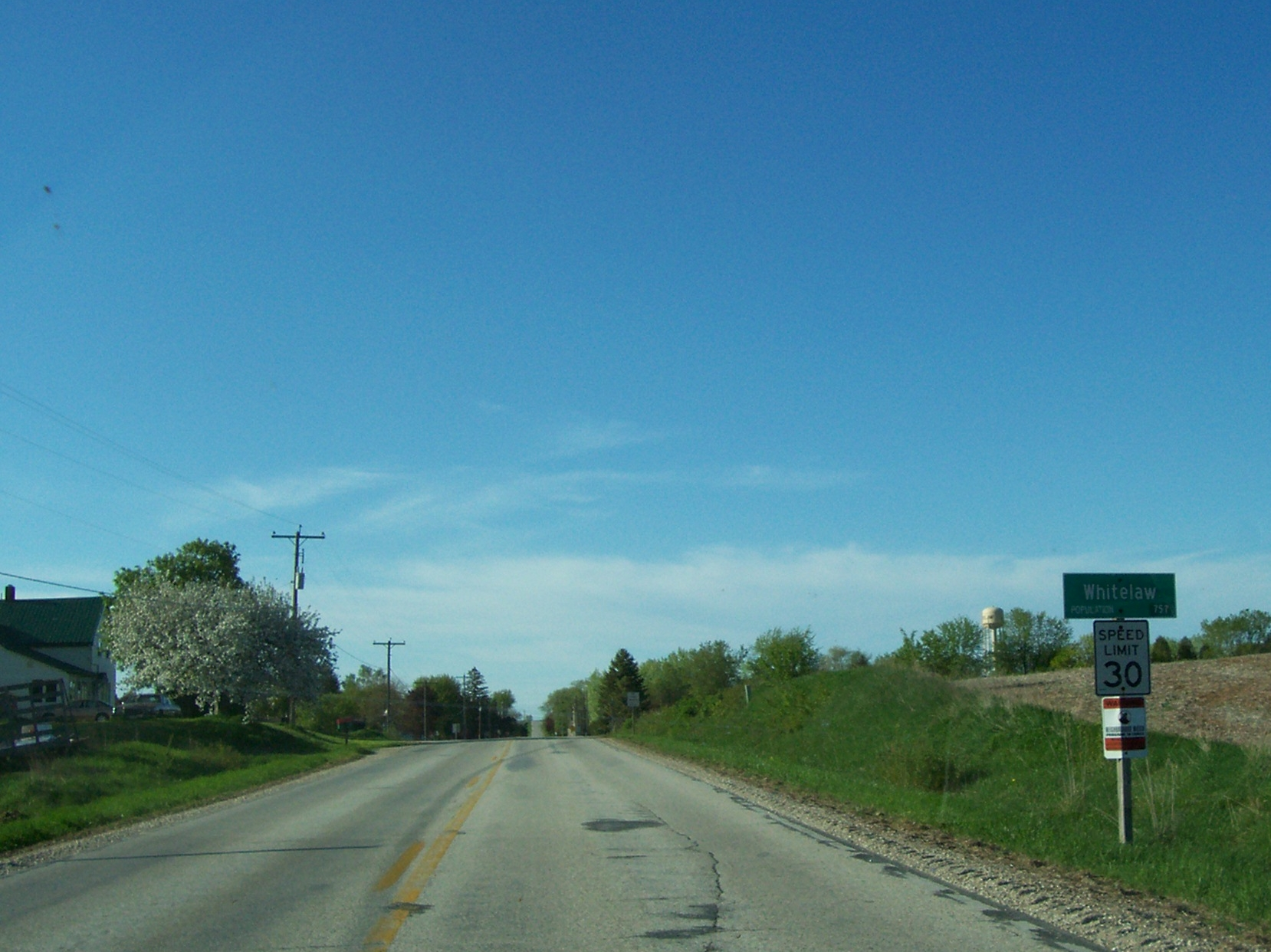
Welcome sign

Whitelaw is a village in Manitowoc County, Wisconsin, United States. The population was 737 at the 2020 census.

== History ==
Originally called Pine Grove Siding and Pine Grove, the present name honors a local landowner named Whitelaw. A post office called Whitelaw has been in operation since 1892.

== Geography ==
Whitelaw is located at 44°8′34″N 87°49′39″W (44.142784, -87.827434).

According to the United States Census Bureau, the village has a total area of 0.55 square miles (1.42 km^{2}), of which 0.54 square miles (1.40 km^{2}) is land and 0.01 square miles (0.03 km^{2}) is water.

== Demographics ==
Historical population
Census	Pop.	Note	%±
1960	420		—
1970	557		32.6%
1980	649		16.5%
1990	700		7.9%
2000	730		4.3%
2010	757		3.7%
2020	737		−2.6%
U.S. Decennial Census

=== 2010 census ===
As of the census of 2010, there were 757 people, 301 households, and 225 families living in the village. The population density was 1,401.9 inhabitants per square mile (541.3/km^{2}). There were 314 housing units at an average density of 581.5 per square mile (224.5/km^{2}). The racial makeup of the village was 95.4% White, 0.4% African American, 0.7% Native American, 1.7% from other races, and 1.8% from two or more races. Hispanic or Latino people of any race were 2.6% of the population.

There were 301 households, of which 31.2% had children under the age of 18 living with them, 64.1% were married couples living together, 6.0% had a female householder with no husband present, 4.7% had a male householder with no wife present, and 25.2% were non-families. 21.3% of all households were made up of individuals, and 7% had someone living alone who was 65 years of age or older. The average household size was 2.51 and the average family size was 2.93.

The median age in the village was 41.6 years. 23.9% of residents were under the age of 18; 6.7% were between the ages of 18 and 24; 24.8% were from 25 to 44; 31.2% were from 45 to 64; and 13.5% were 65 years of age or older. The gender makeup of the village was 50.3% male and 49.7% female.

=== 2000 census ===
As of the census of 2000, there were 730 people, 278 households, and 205 families living in the village. The population density was 1,312.0 people per square mile (503.3/km^{2}). There were 284 housing units at an average density of 510.4 per square mile (195.8/km^{2}). The racial makeup of the village was 99.32% White, 0.27% African American, 0.27% Native American and 0.14% Asian. Hispanic or Latino people of any race were 0.55% of the population.

There were 278 households, out of which 33.1% had children under the age of 18 living with them, 62.9% were married couples living together, 6.8% had a female householder with no husband present, and 25.9% were non-families. 20.5% of all households were made up of individuals, and 11.5% had someone living alone who was 65 years of age or older. The average household size was 2.62 and the average family size was 3.02.

In the village, the population was spread out, with 26.2% under the age of 18, 7.7% from 18 to 24, 30.5% from 25 to 44, 22.9% from 45 to 64, and 12.7% who were 65 years of age or older. The median age was 36 years. For every 100 females, there were 101.7 males. For every 100 females age 18 and over, there were 98.9 males.

The median income for a household in the village was $51,029, and the median income for a family was $53,036. Males had a median income of $36,971 versus $25,833 for females. The per capita income for the village was $20,249. About 3.5% of families and 5.4% of the population were below the poverty line, including 5.4% of those under age 18 and 13.9% of those age 65 or over.
