= Denmark, Wisconsin =

- Village
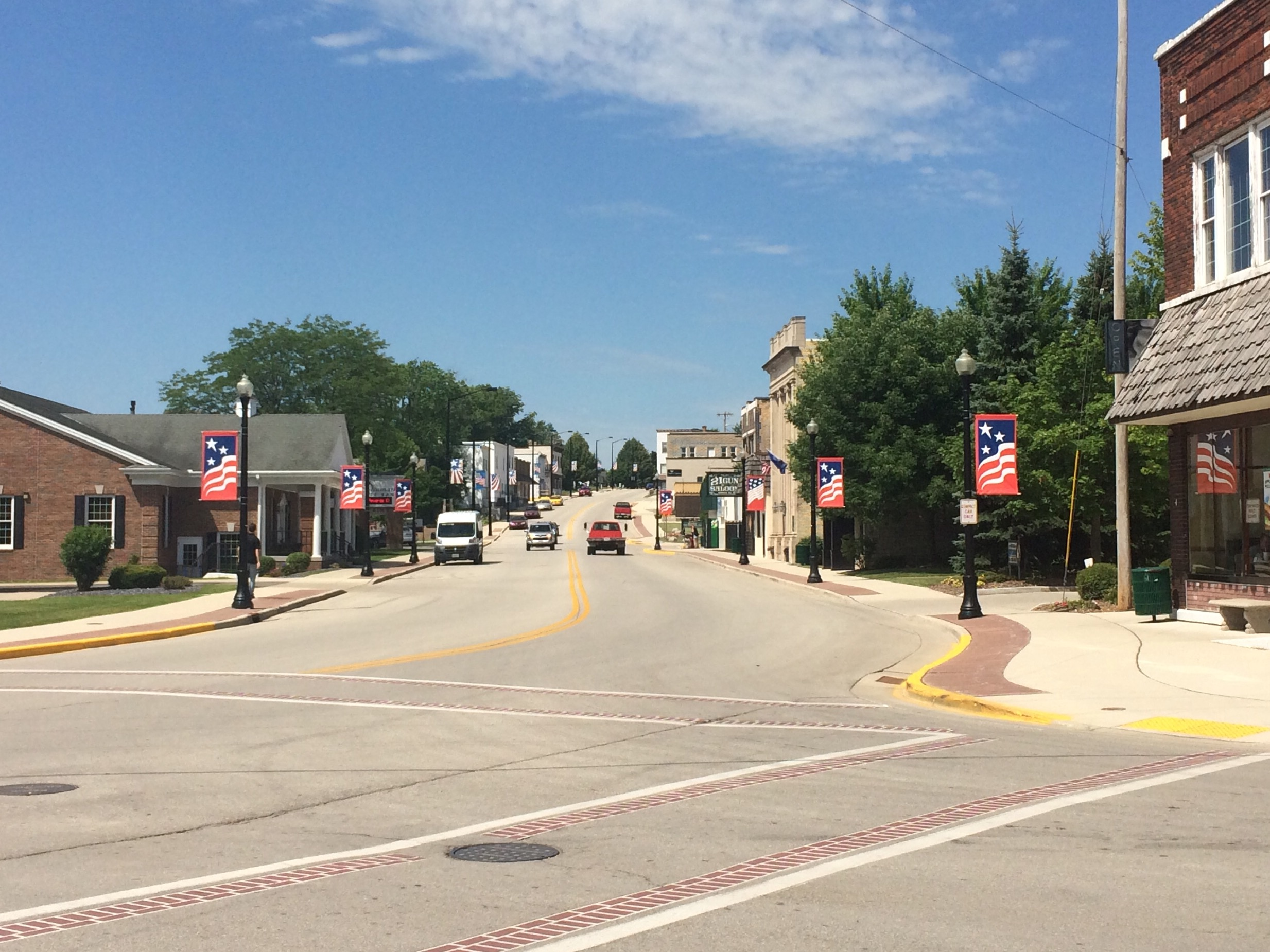
- Downtown Denmark, Wisconsin

- Location of Denmark in Brown County, Wisconsin.
- Coordinates: 44°20′58″N 87°49′52″W
- Country: United States
- State: Wisconsin
- County: Brown

Area
  - Total: 1.97 sq mi (5.10 km^{2})
  - Land: 1.97 sq mi (5.10 km^{2})
  - Water: 0 sq mi (0.00 km^{2})
- Elevation: 892 ft (272 m)

Population (2020)
  - Total: 2,408
  - Density: 1,155.8/sq mi (446.25/km^{2})
- Time zone: UTC−06:00 (Central (CST))
  - Summer (DST): UTC−05:00 (CDT)
- ZIP Code: 54208
- Area code: 920
- FIPS code: 55-19700
- GNIS feature ID: 1583075
- Website: www.denmark-wi.org

Denmark is a village in Brown County in the U.S. state of Wisconsin. The population was 2,408 at the 2020 census. It is part of the Green Bay Metropolitan Statistical Area. The village is located within the town of New Denmark.

Denmark began to be settled by Danish immigrants in 1848, and has been referred to, along with Hartland, Wisconsin, as the "nuclei of what developed into one of the most important regions of Danish immigration in the United States."

== History ==
=== Early settlement ===
In 1846, a Prussian immigrant, John Herbes, purchased 40 acres of land in the area of what is now Denmark.

In 1848, the second settler, and the first Danish immigrant, a man named Niels Gotfredsen, bought 160 acres in the area. He and his wife were referred to as the 'King and Queen of Denmark', because they were the first Danish settlers of the town of Denmark.

==== Big bribe of 1854 ====
In 1854, the residents of Brown County, Wisconsin voted on whether Green Bay or De Pere would be the county seat. This was also the year that the residents of Denmark wanted to build a church, but they did not have any money. A man from De Pere came to the town, and offered to pay two dollars for every vote the people of Denmark would cast in favor of De Pere.

On election day, 15 men and boys from Denmark turned out to cast their votes for De Pere, and the town was given $30. But instead of building a church, as was originally intended, the town built a school.

==== First business ====
In 1871, Hans Beyer immigrated from old Denmark to New York City, from which he traveled to Green Bay. From Green Bay, Beyer traveled seven hours by ox team to get to Denmark. In 1875, Beyer opened a store in Denmark, which was the first business in the new town, using a loan of $200. In 1896, Beyer built a new store and cheese factory next to the old store.

=== Turn of the 20th century ===
In 1906, the Chicago & Northwestern railroad was built through the village. The depot was built in the downtown area. The railroad was originally planned to travel through Cooperstown, Wisconsin, rather than Denmark, but railroad officials decided against this plan.

On June 15, 1915, the town of Denmark held a special election of the issue of incorporation. The official vote tally was 109 in favor, and 26 against. Later that year, Denmark was officially incorporated into a village.

In 1915, the Kriwanek Brothers established a Ford dealership in the village, which was second oldest Ford dealership in the state of Wisconsin.

On March 3, 1949, Denmark State Bank was robbed of $38,000 at gunpoint. This was the first bank robbery in Brown County, Wisconsin. The Federal Bureau of Investigation became involved, and the perpetrators were caught over the next few weeks.

=== Later history ===
The last passenger train to come through the village was on April 30, 1971.

In 1981, Interstate 43 opened just west of the village.

On September 7, 1988, a Chicago & Northwestern train derailed as it was passing the Lake to Lake cheese plant. 20 of the 144 train cars derailed, including several that were carrying sulfuric acid and fuel oil. The train also had cars that were carrying chlorine, however, the engineer did not know which cars contained the chemical, and the wind was blowing towards a residential district. This information led the village and county officials to evacuate a large portion of the village. It was soon found that none of the chemicals had leaked, and residents were allowed to return to their homes.

In 1996, Wisconsin Central Ltd., which had bought the train line from Chicago & Northwestern, abandoned the tracks between Denmark and Rockwood, Wisconsin The abandoned rail line was converted into the Devil's River State Trail, which was completed in 2013.

== Geography ==
According to the United States Census Bureau, the village has a total area of 1.93 square miles (5.00 km^{2}), all land.

=== Climate ===
Denmark has a humid continental climate (Köppen climate classification Dfb), with some moderation due to the village's proximity to Lake Michigan.

Climate data for Denmark, Wisconsin, 1981-2010
Month	Jan	Feb	Mar	Apr	May	Jun	Jul	Aug	Sep	Oct	Nov	Dec	Year
Mean daily maximum °F (°C)	25 (−4)	29.2 (−1.6)	39 (4)	53.1 (11.7)	64.9 (18.3)	75 (24)	79.1 (26.2)	77.9 (25.5)	70 (21)	56.8 (13.8)	42.7 (5.9)	29.4 (−1.4)	53.5 (12.0)
Daily mean °F (°C)	16.8 (−8.4)	20.7 (−6.3)	30.4 (−0.9)	43.6 (6.4)	54.6 (12.6)	64.4 (18.0)	69.1 (20.6)	67.6 (19.8)	59.6 (15.3)	47.6 (8.7)	35 (2)	21.9 (−5.6)	44.3 (6.9)
Mean daily minimum °F (°C)	8.6 (−13.0)	12.1 (−11.1)	21.7 (−5.7)	34 (1)	44.3 (6.8)	53.7 (12.1)	59.1 (15.1)	57.3 (14.1)	49.1 (9.5)	38.4 (3.6)	27.3 (−2.6)	14.4 (−9.8)	35.0 (1.7)
Average precipitation inches (mm)	1.40 (36)	1.11 (28)	1.85 (47)	2.82 (72)	3.13 (80)	3.72 (94)	3.31 (84)	3.82 (97)	3.52 (89)	2.87 (73)	2.19 (56)	1.53 (39)	31.27 (795)
Source: NOAA

== Infrastructure ==
=== Highways ===
- Interstate 43 northbound leads to Green Bay and southbound leads to Manitowoc and Milwaukee.
- WIS 96 begins on the western edge of Denmark, Wisconsin and travels west to Fremont.
- begins on the western edge of Denmark, Wisconsin and travels east, ending just south of Stangelville.
- passes through the village, traveling north to New Franken and south to Marilbel and Kellnersville.

=== Railroad ===
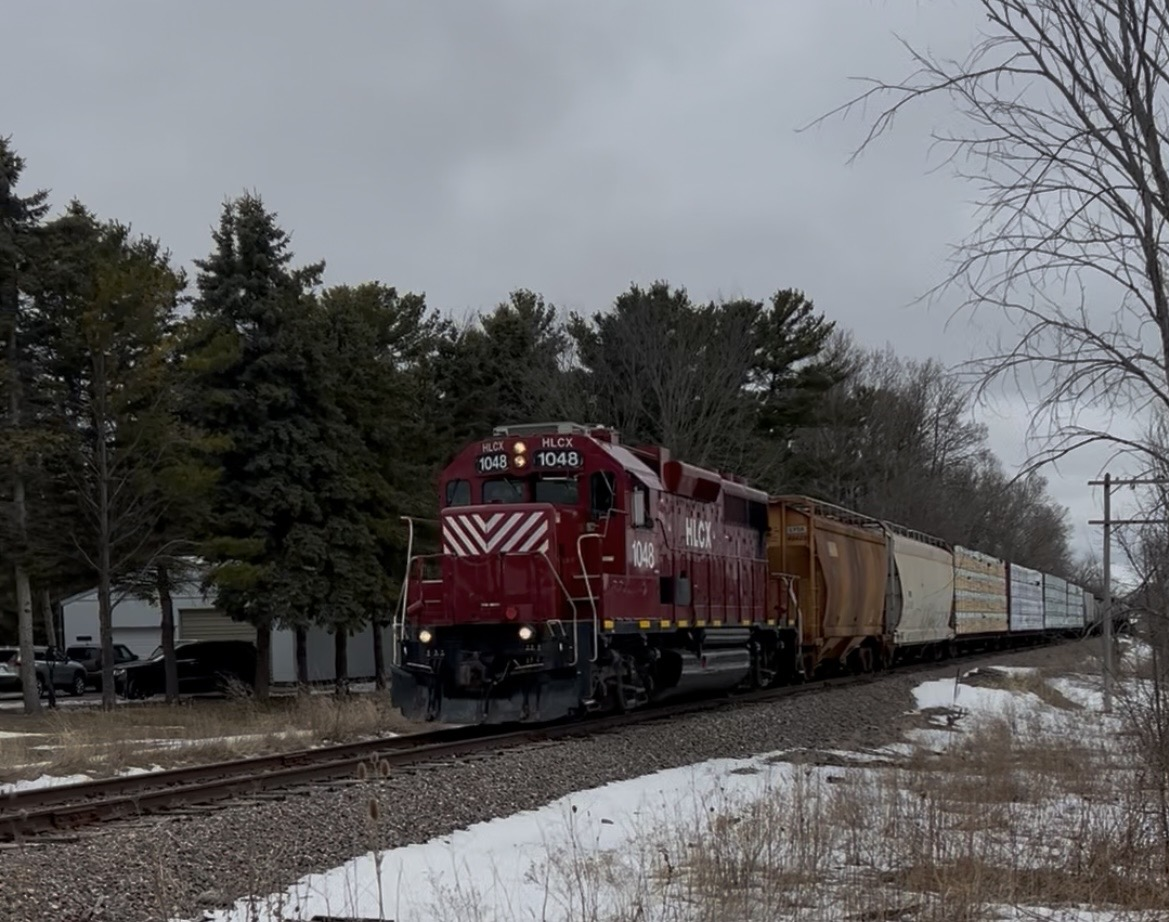
HLCX 1048 leased to Fox Valley and Lake Superior for local service

Fox Valley & Lake Superior maintains freight service between Green Bay and Denmark.

=== Utilities ===
Wisconsin Public Service provides electricity for the village.

The village provides sewer and water service to residents. The village owns and operates the Denmark Wastewater Treatment Plant, which was built in 1980.

== Demographics ==
Historical population
Census	Pop.	Note	%±
1920	735		—
1930	779		6.0%
1940	864		10.9%
1950	1,012		17.1%
1960	1,106		9.3%
1970	1,364		23.3%
1980	1,475		8.1%
1990	1,612		9.3%
2000	1,958		21.5%
2010	2,123		8.4%
2020	2,408		13.4%
U.S. Decennial Census

=== 2010 census ===
As of the census of 2010, there were 2,123 people, 923 households, and 562 families residing in the village. The population density was 1,100.0 inhabitants per square mile (424.7/km^{2}). There were 988 housing units at an average density of 511.9 per square mile (197.6/km^{2}). The racial makeup of the village was 95.3% White, 0.4% African American, 0.6% Native American, 0.7% Asian, 1.6% from other races, and 1.4% from two or more races. Hispanic or Latino of any race were 2.4% of the population.

There were 923 households, of which 31.9% had children under the age of 18 living with them, 44.7% were married couples living together, 11.4% had a female householder with no husband present, 4.8% had a male householder with no wife present, and 39.1% were non-families. 32.5% of all households were made up of individuals, and 13.6% had someone living alone who was 65 years of age or older. The average household size was 2.30 and the average family size was 2.94.

The median age in the village was 37 years. 25.5% of residents were under the age of 18; 7.3% were between the ages of 18 and 24; 28.2% were from 25 to 44; 25.8% were from 45 to 64; and 13.3% were 65 years of age or older. The gender makeup of the village was 49.0% male and 51.0% female.

=== 2000 census ===
As of the census of 2000, there were 1958 people, 801 households, and 524 families residing in the village. The population density was 1,321.5 people per square mile (510.8/km^{2}). There were 833 housing units at an average density of 479.5 per square mile (297.9/km^{2}). The racial makeup of the village was 97.8% White, 0.5% African American, 1% Native American, 0.1% Asian, 0.2% from other races, and 0.6% from two or more races. Hispanic or Latino of any race were 0.3% of the population.

There were 801 households, out of which 34.2% had children under the age of 18 living with them, 49.6% were married couples living together, 11.1% had a female householder with no husband present, and 34.6% were non-families. 39.3% of all households were made up of individuals, and 14.6% had someone living alone who was 65 years of age or older. The average household size was 2.42 and the average family size was 3.05.

In the village, the population was spread out, with 27.3% under the age of 18, 8.5% from 18 to 24, 29.7% from 25 to 44, 19.3% from 45 to 64, and 15.2% who were 65 years of age or older. The median age was 35.6 years. For every 100 females, there were 92.5 males. For every 100 females age 18 and over, there were 87.5 males.

The median income for a household in the village was $38,106, and the median income for a family was $48,214. Males had a median income of $34,952 versus $25,000 for females. The per capita income for the village was $18,301. About 4.6% of families and 5.6% of the population were below the poverty line, including 6.4% of those under age 18 and 9.3% of those age 65 or over.

== Education ==
The village of Denmark is served by the School District of Denmark, which consists of:

- Denmark Elementary School, Grades 4K-5
- Denmark Middle School, Grades 6-8
- Denmark High School, Grades 9-12
- Denmark Community School, Grades 8-12

== Government ==
Denmark is governed by a village board consisting of six members, and the village president. The village president and board members serve two-year terms. The board enacts local ordinances and approves the budget. The village also elects a Municipal Court Judge, who serves a four-year term.

Denmark is represented by Mike Gallagher (R) in the United States House of Representatives, and by Ron Johnson (R) and Tammy Baldwin (D) in the United States Senate. Frank Lasee (R) represents Denmark in the Wisconsin State Senate, and Andre Jacque (R) represents Denmark in the Wisconsin State Assembly.

== Economy ==
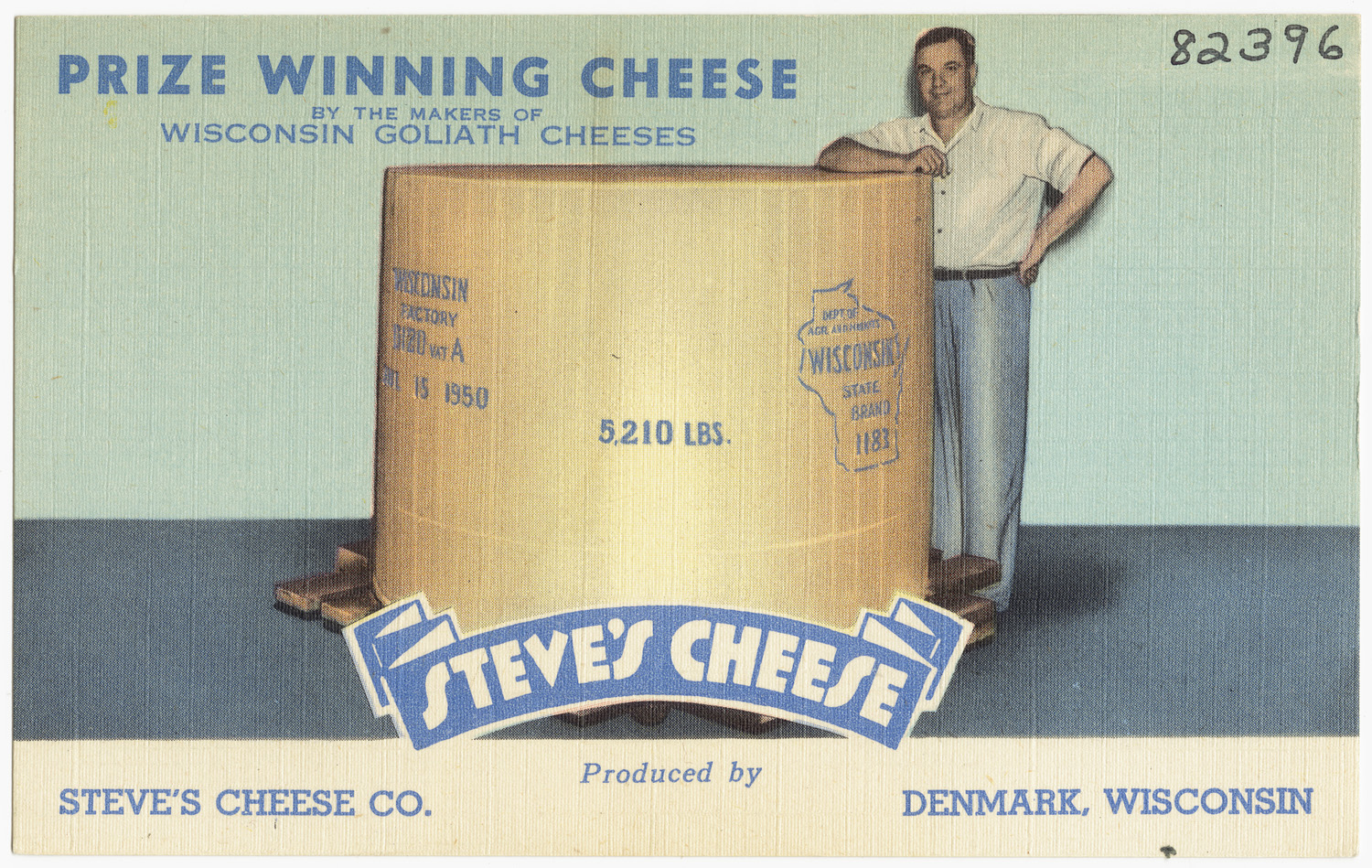
A 5,210 lb cheese, produced in 1950 by Steve's Cheese

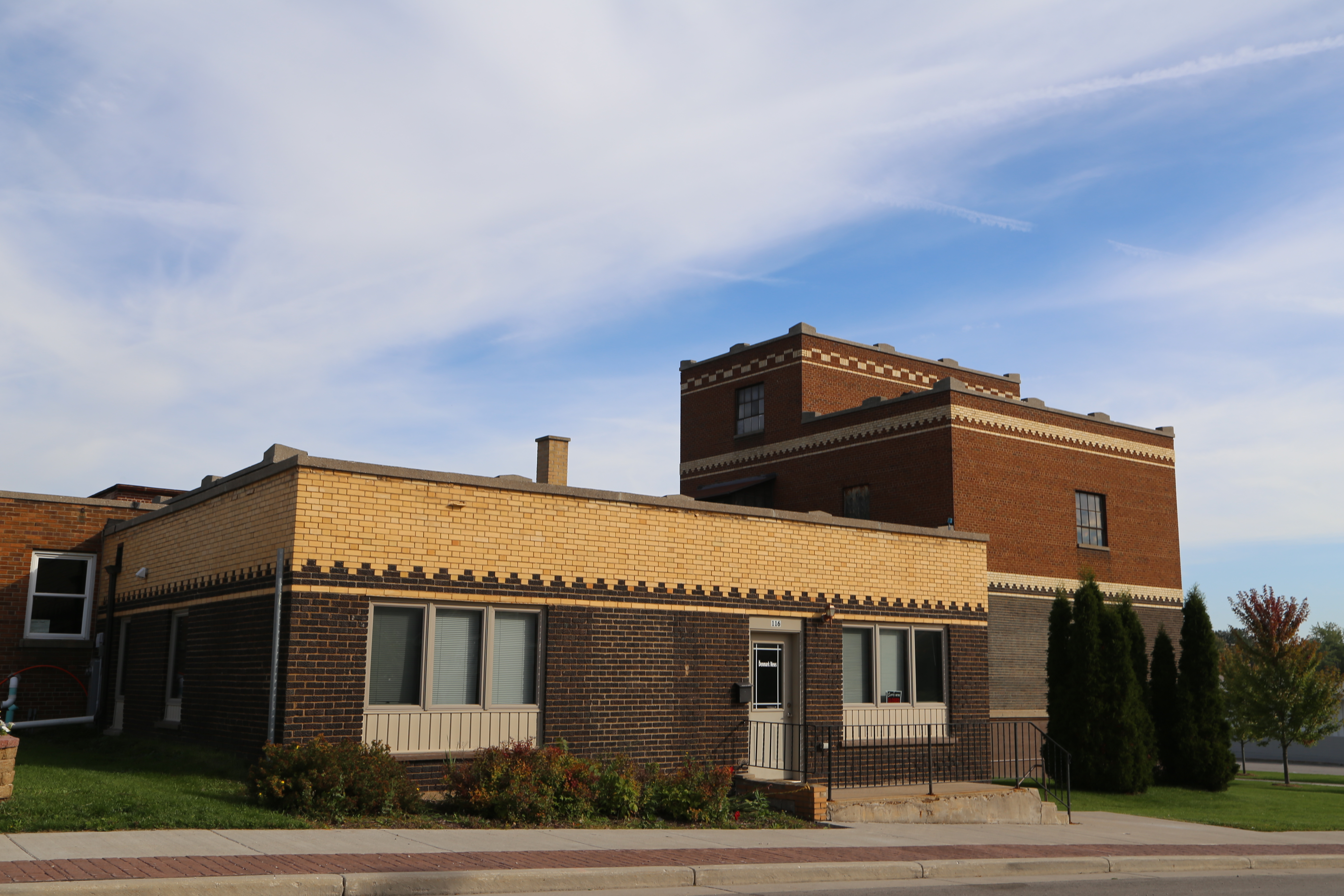
Former Denmark Brewing Company building in Denmark, Wisconsin. It currently houses the offices of the Denmark News.

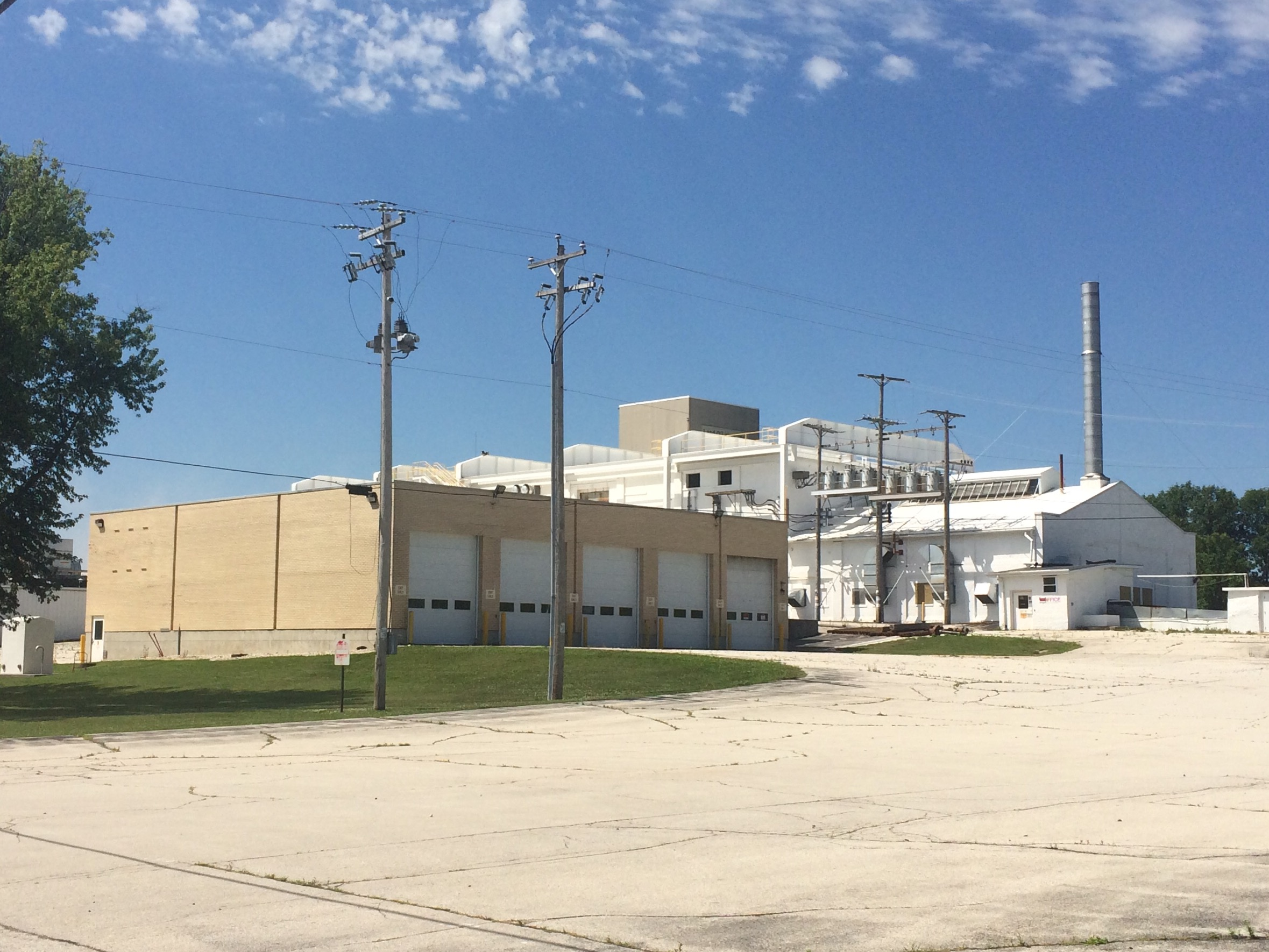
Former Land O' Lakes plant in Denmark, Wisconsin.

=== Industry ===
==== Brewing ====
In 1934, Raymond and Peter Stark founded the Denmark Brewing Company. The brewery produced about 15,000 barrels per year, which was marketed under the 20th Century Pale and Old Town Lager brands. The brewery also brewed beer under contract for Rahr's Brewing Company of Green Bay. At its height, the Denmark Brewing Company ranking among the top one-third of all breweries in the state by production. The Denmark Brewing Company closed in 1947.

==== Dairy ====
In 1896, Hans Beyer built the first cheese factory in the village. The factory employed two people, and handled between 7,500 and 8,000 pounds of milk per day. In 1899, Beyer sold the cheese factory, as well as his general store, because of his failing health.

In 1912, the Danish Prize Milk Company was founded. In 1926, Pet, Inc. acquired the plant. In 1946, Blue Moon Foods acquired the plant, and converted its production to cheese, marketed under the brand name of 'Gold-N-Rich'. In 1949, the plant was purchased by Lake to Lake Dairy Cooperative, and began producing cheddar cheese. Under their ownership, the Denmark cheese plant became the second largest cheddar cheese producer in the state. In 1982, Lake to Lake merged with Land O' Lakes. In 2014, Land O' Lakes closed the Denmark cheese plant.

=== Major employers ===
Major employers located in Denmark include: Denmark Bancshares, Dufeck Wood Products, Northern Concrete Construction, Salm Partners, LLC, and United Cooperative.

== Arts and culture ==
In 2011, Molly Johnson purchased the Academy of Fine Art in Kewaunee, Wisconsin, and moved it to a restored feed mill in Denmark. The Academy of Fine Art includes eight faculty members that teach art classes year round. Johnson also runs her art studio out of the Academy. The Academy of Fine Art is the only Art Renewal Center certified atelier in the state of Wisconsin.

The Denmark Historical Museum is located downtown in the basement of the BMO Harris Bank branch.

Every summer, the Denmark Lions Club holds a festival called the Denmark Lions Weekend. The festival spans three days, and has recently included a demolition derby, tractor and horse pulls, bands, a 5k run, and a parade.

== Media ==
=== Newspaper ===
Denmark is served by The Denmark News, which is published weekly on Fridays.

=== Radio ===
- WGBW 1590 AM
- WPCK 99.5 & 104.9 FM

== Points of interest ==
- Devil's River State Trail

== Notable people ==
- Erica Deichmann Gregg, Canadian potter
- Theodore Marcus Hansen, United Evangelical Lutheran Church leader
- Danen Kane, Christian musician
- Harvey Larsen, Wisconsin State Representative
- Niels P. Larsen, Wisconsin State Representative
- Red Ostergard, baseball pinch hitter with the Chicago White Sox
- Johan Olsen, pastor of the Scandinavian Evangelical Lutheran Congregation 1867-1872
- Jean Sutton, science fiction author
- Paul J. Tikalsky, engineer, dean at Oklahoma State University

== Images ==
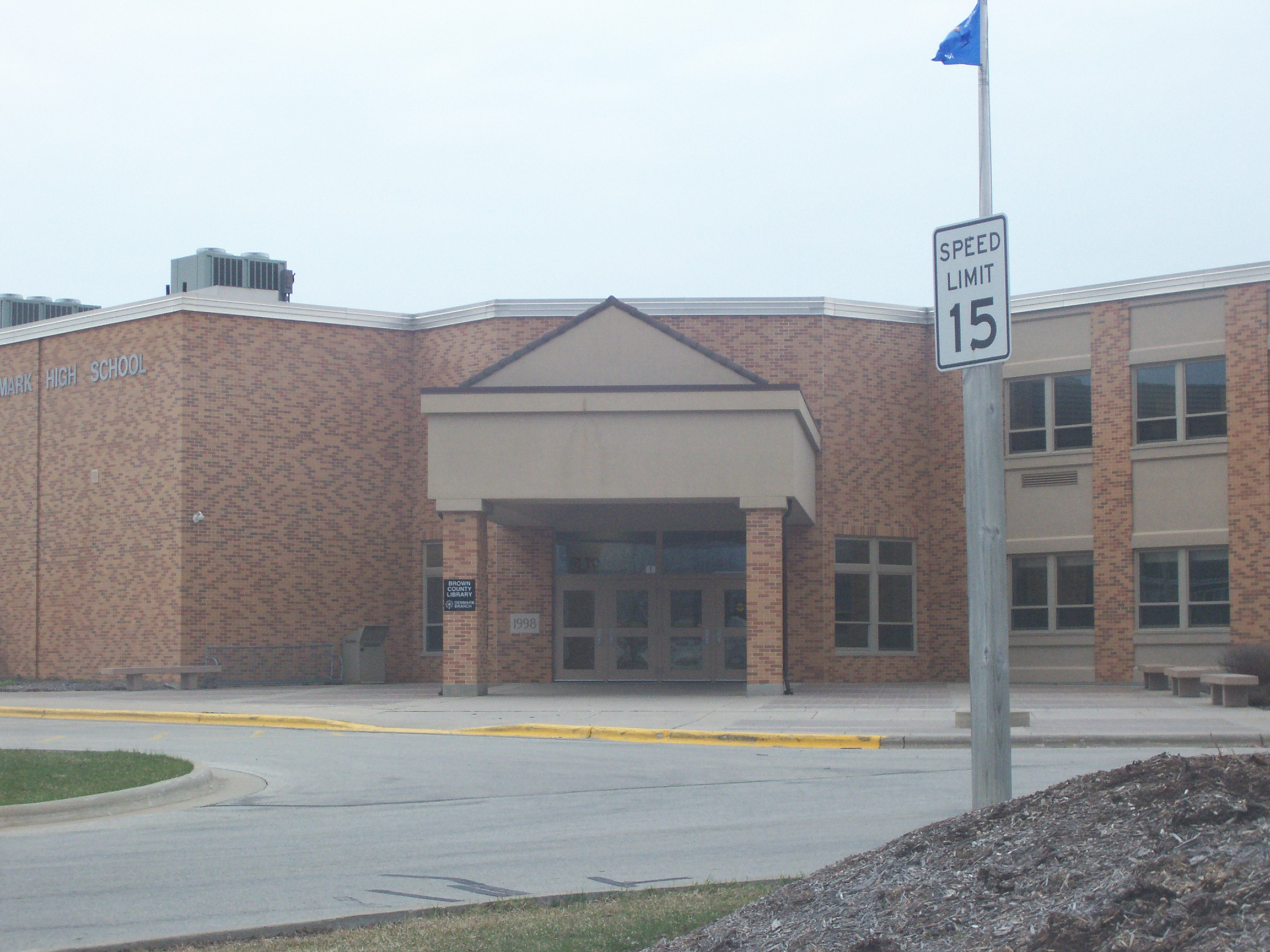
Denmark High School

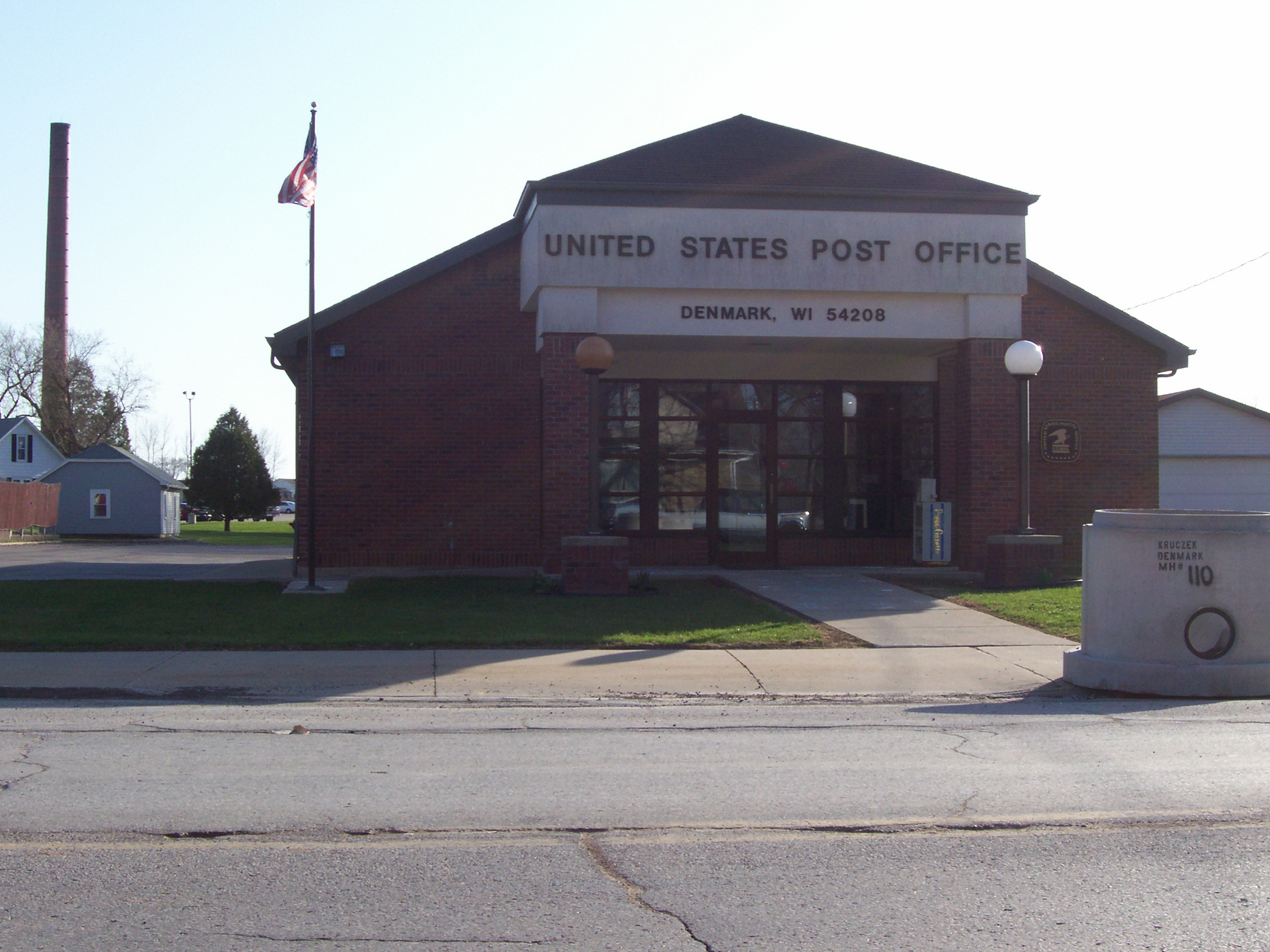
Denmark Post office

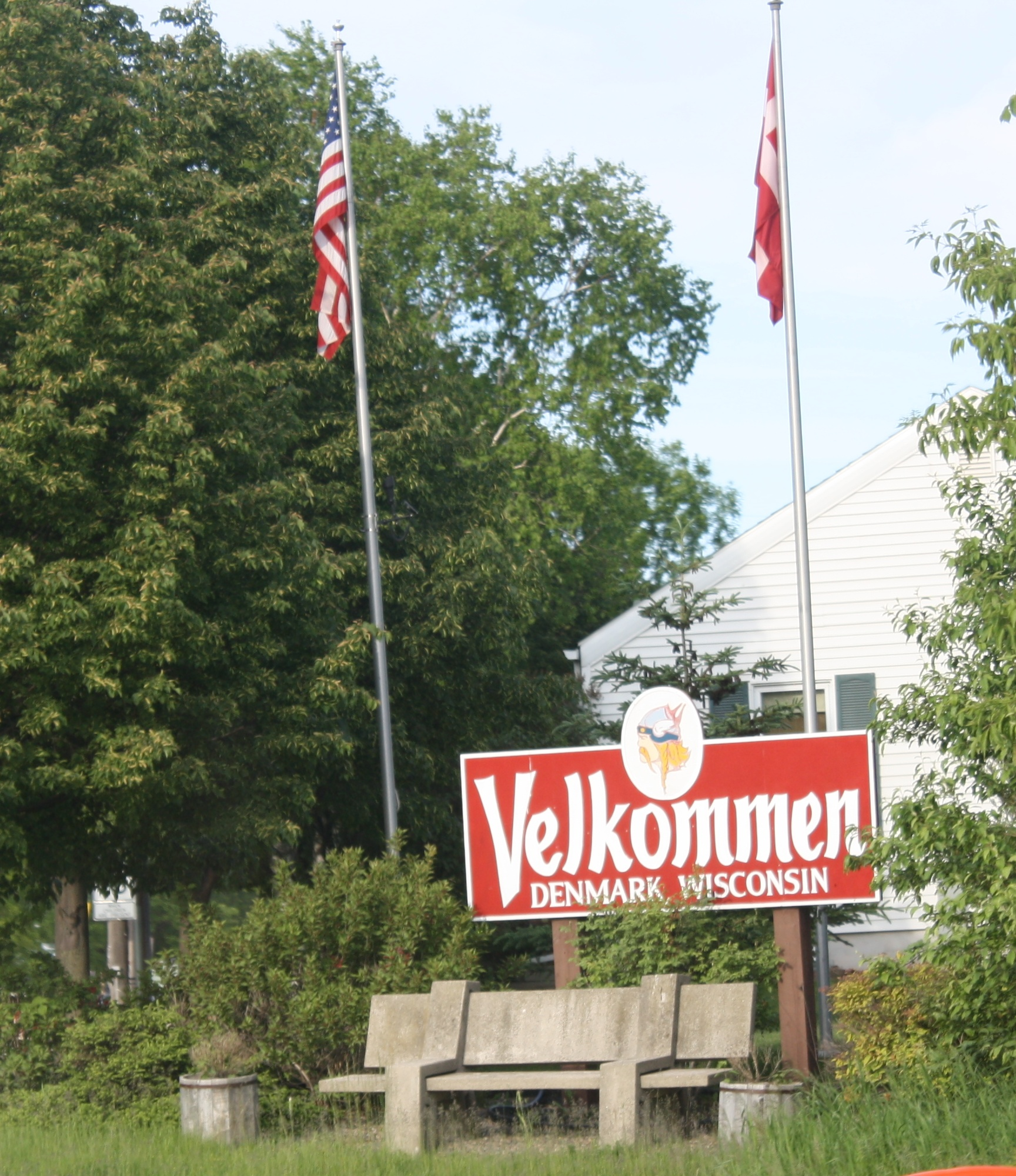
Velkommen sign showing relationship with the country of Denmark

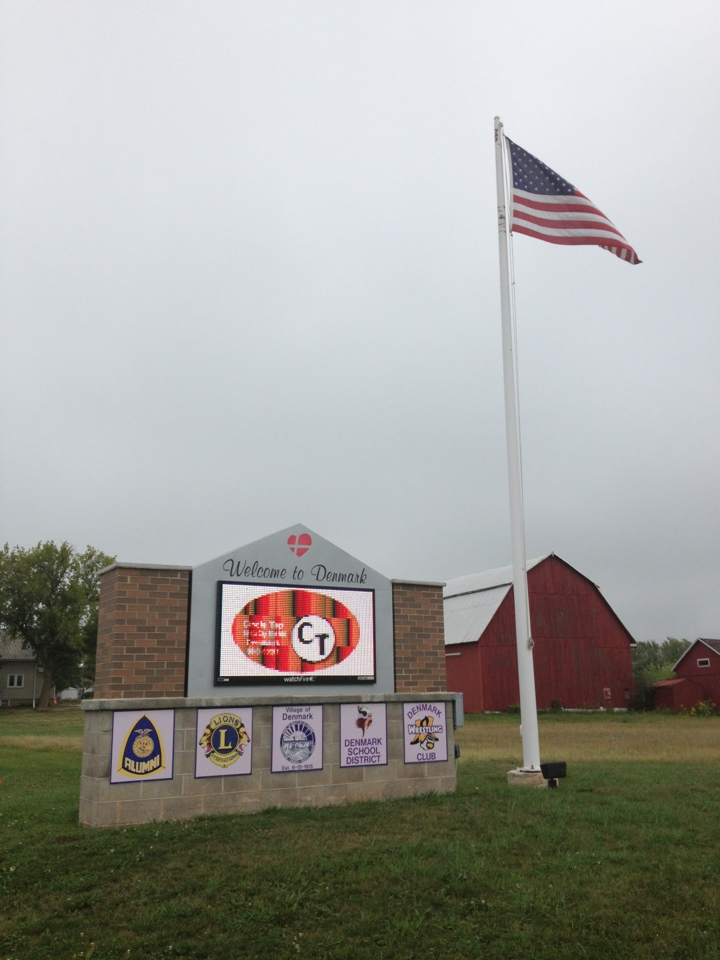
Denmark, WI Welcome Sign

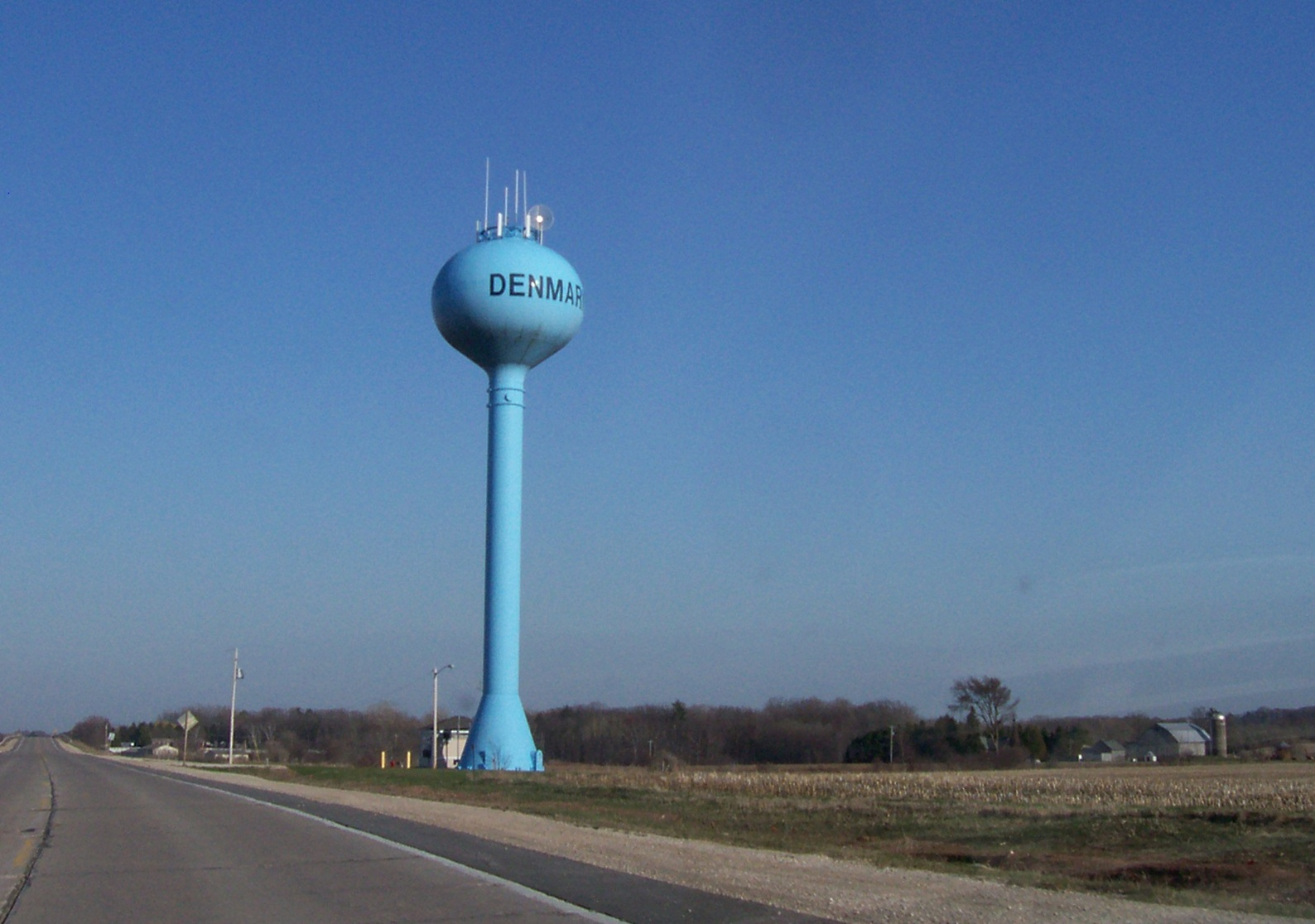
Water tower

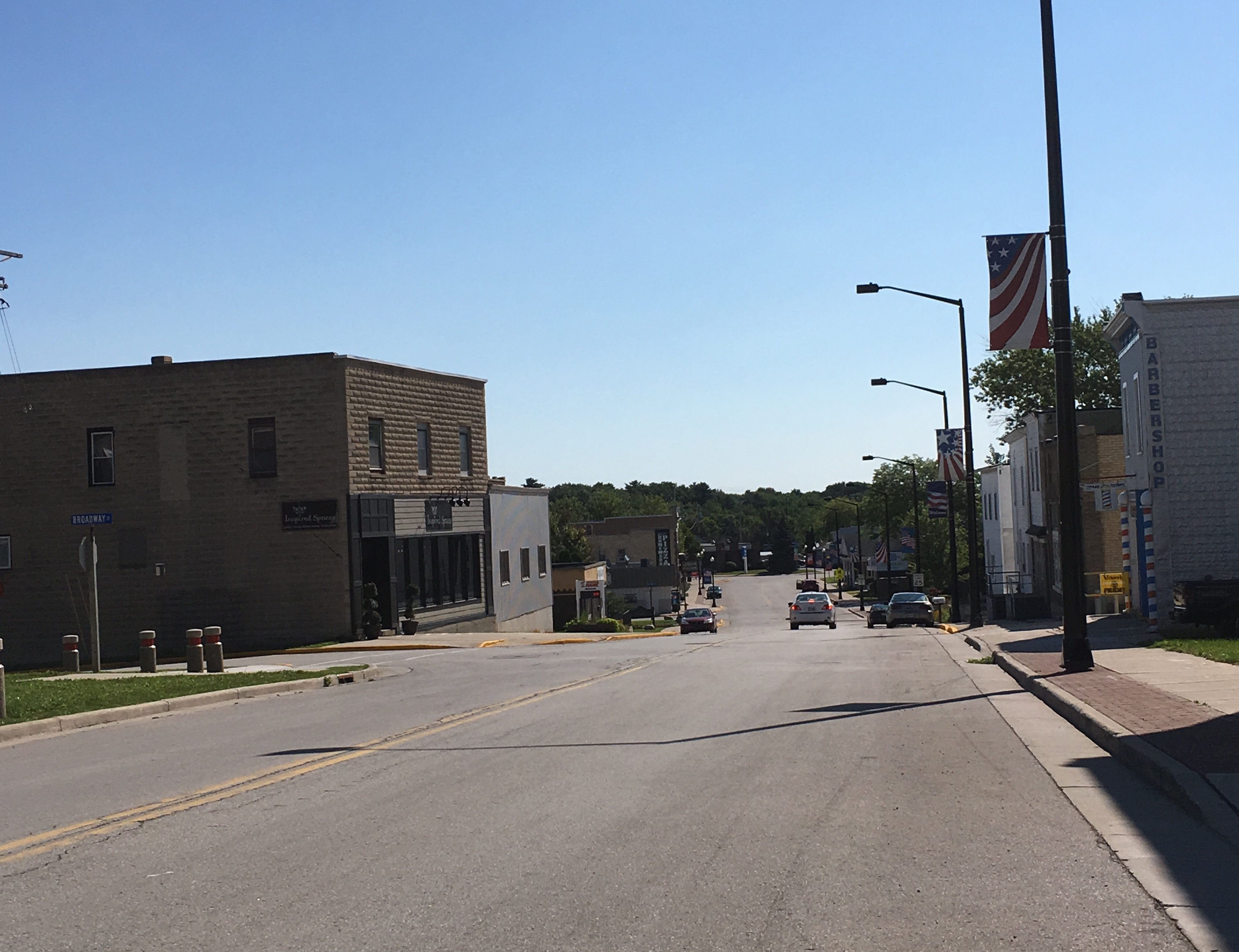
Downtown Denmark

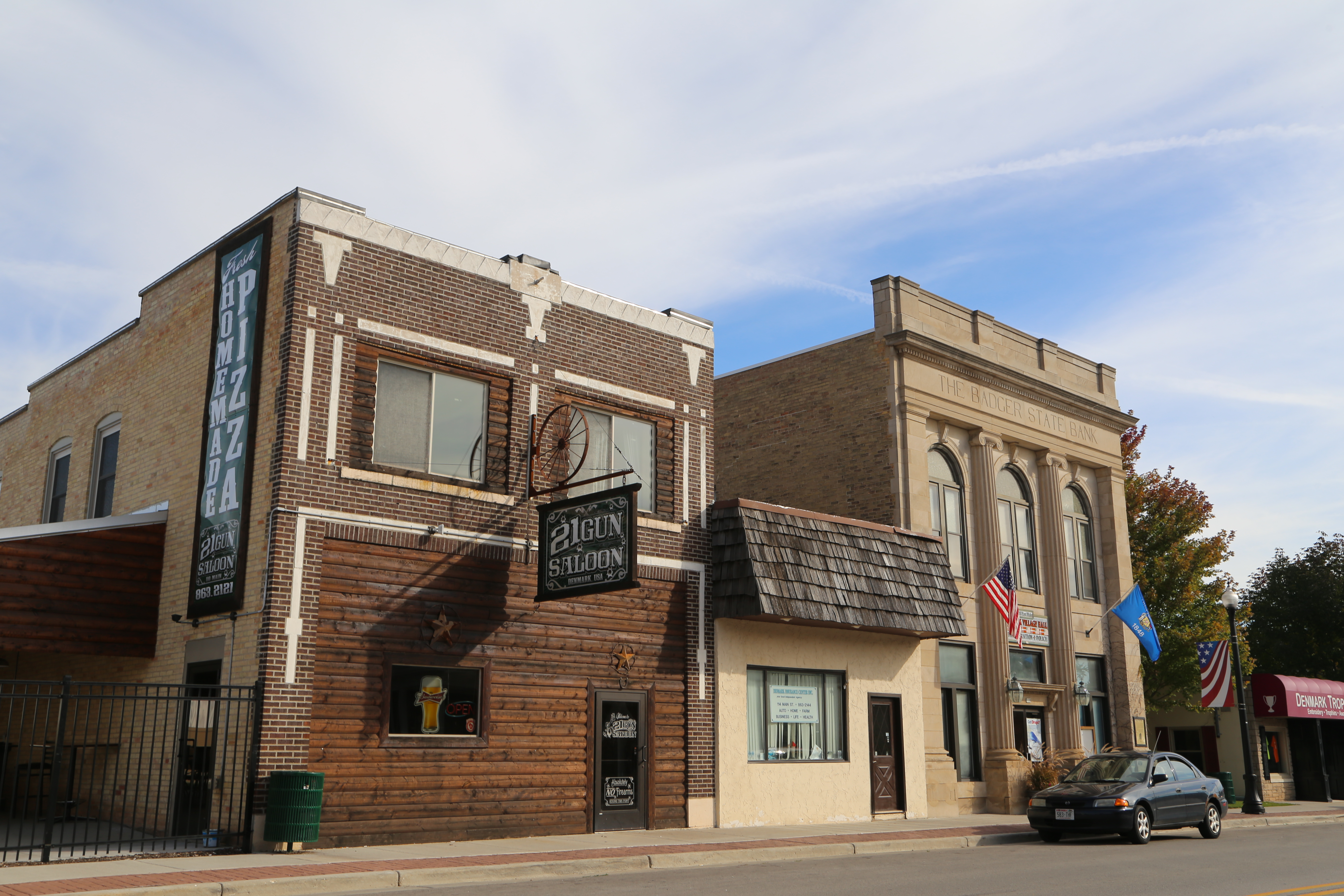
Downtown Denmark

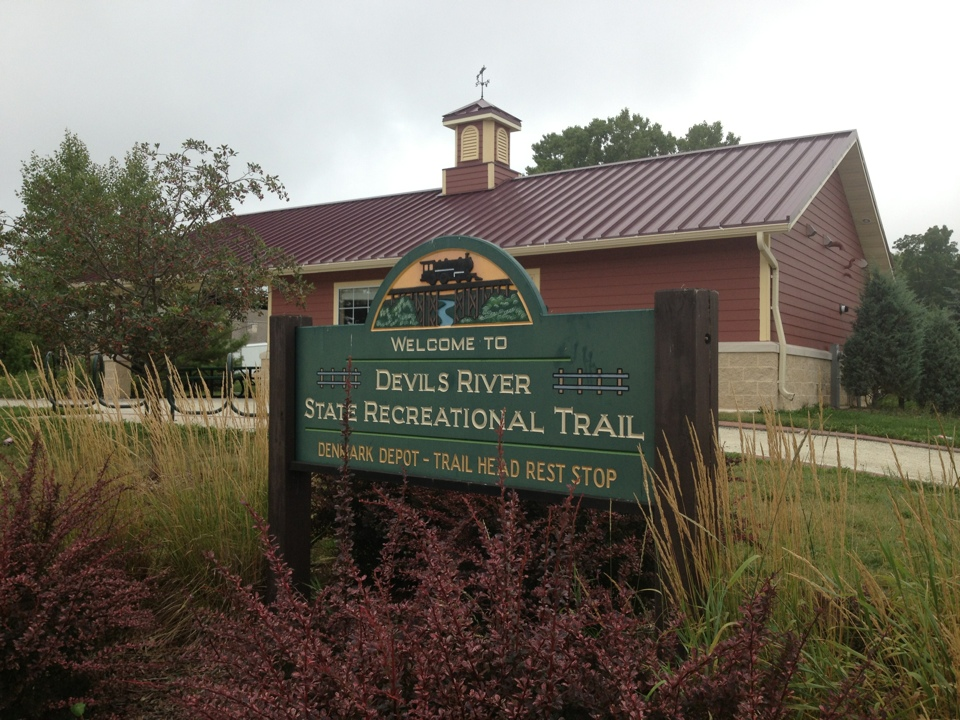
Devil's River Trail head Sign

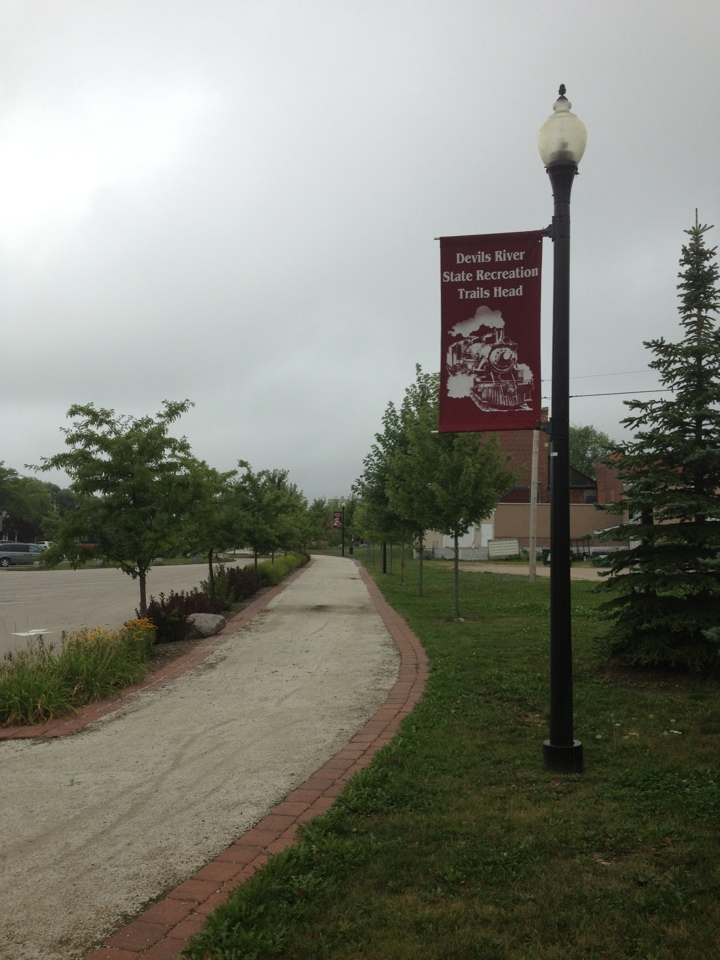
Devil's River Trail

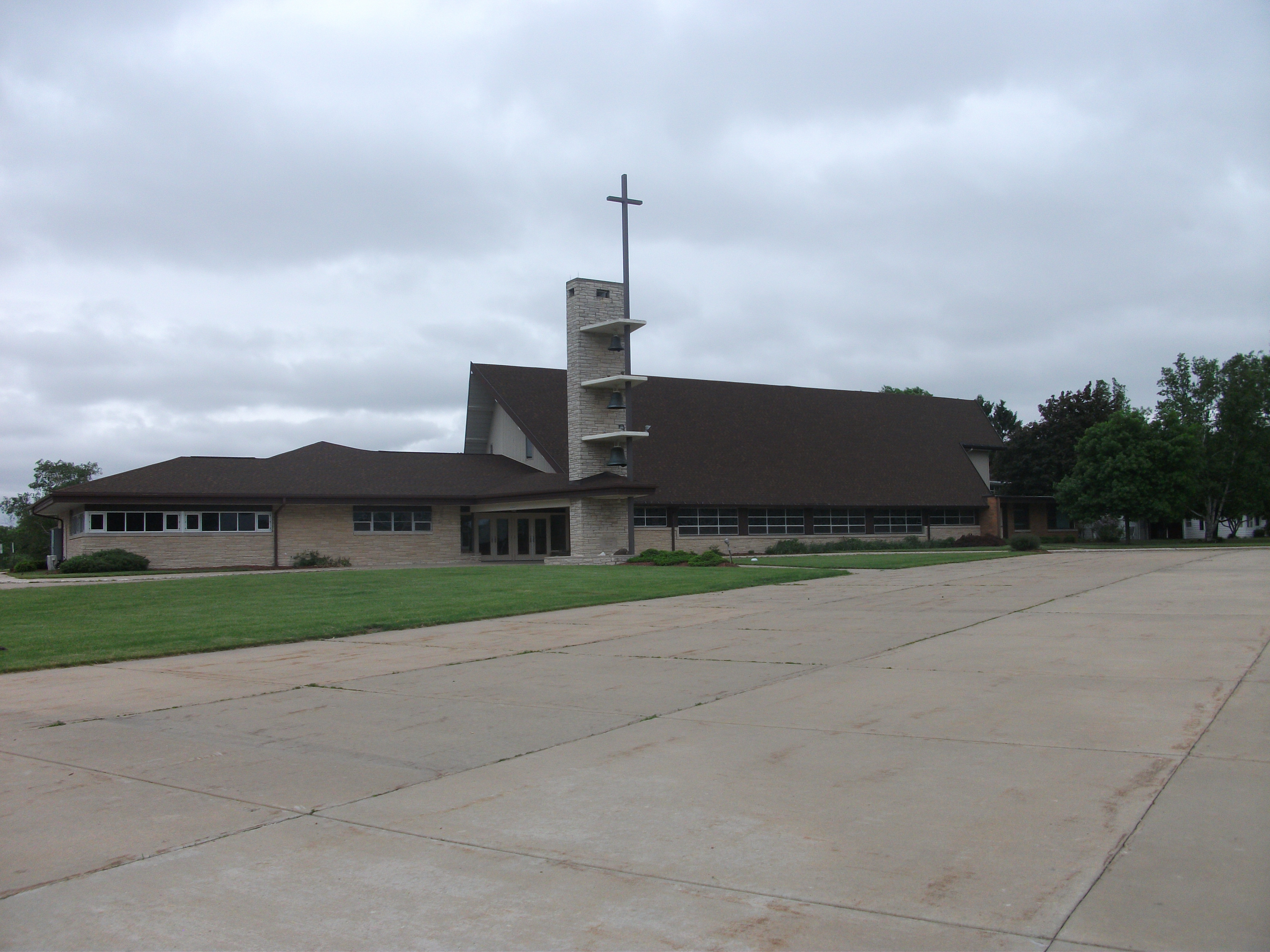
Our Savior's Lutheran Church

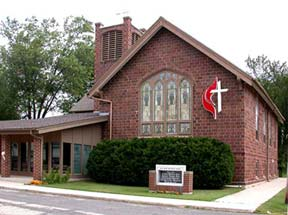
Zion United Methodist Church
