= The Denmark News =

Newspaper in Denmark, Wisconsin, U.S.

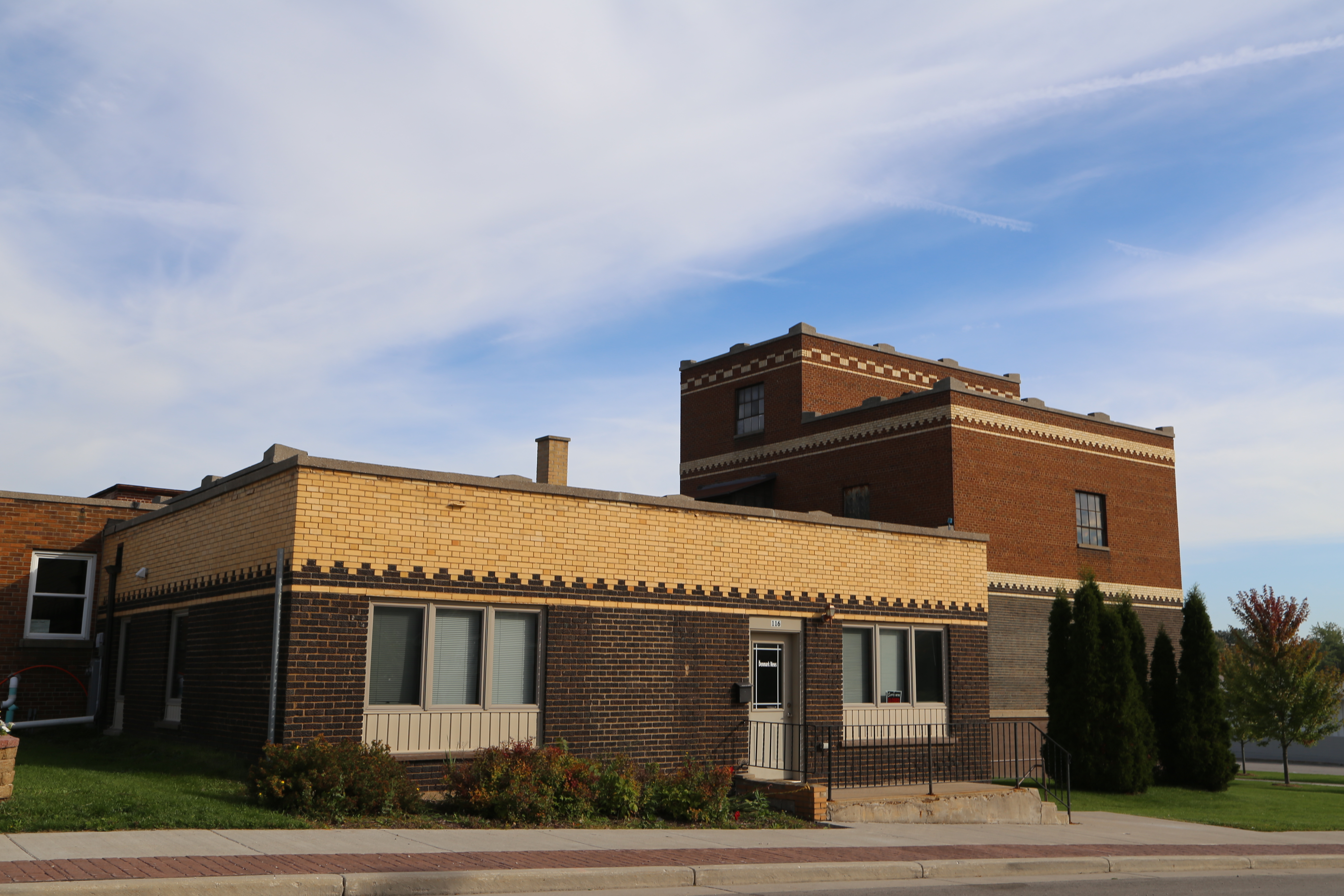
- The Denmark News Building
- Type: Weekly newspaper
- Format: Tabloid
- Owner: Nelson Media Company
- Publisher: Chris Nelson
- Editor: Chris Nelson
- Founded: 2009
- Language: English
- Headquarters: 116 Main Street, Denmark, WI 54208 U.S.
- Circulation: 1,416 (as of 2022)
- Website: thedenmarknews.com

The Denmark News is a weekly newspaper based in Denmark, Wisconsin. The newspaper primarily serves Denmark, Maribel, and Kellnersville, and is distributed throughout Brown, Kewaunee, and Manitowoc Counties.

== History ==
The paper began as a joint venture between local businessmen Ryan Radue and Mark Hansen, who decided to start the paper soon after Gannett Company ceased publication of the former Denmark Press in 2008. Many of the staff members of the former paper were hired by Radue and Hansen for their new paper.

The paper is now owned and operated by Chris Nelson and Nelson Media Company. Nelson owns five other newspapers, a video production and marketing company, and a Northwoods League Baseball team in Indiana. His editor is Jacob Heiser, office manager is Pam Watzka, graphic designer is Danielle Poltruck, and sports editor is Ryan Wilson.

The newspaper is a member of the Wisconsin Newspaper Association.
