= Denmark Bancshares =

Bank holding company

- Type: Public Company
- Traded as: DMKBA (OTC)
- Industry: Personal Banking & Lending
- Founded: Denmark, Wisconsin (1907)
- Headquarters: Denmark, Wisconsin
- Number of locations: 5
- Key people: Kenneth Larsen (Chairman) & Scot Thompson (President & CEO)
- Products: Financial services
- Total assets: US $70,249,000(December 2021)

Denmark Bancshares was a U.S. regional bank holding company based in Denmark, Wisconsin. It was the parent company of Denmark State Bank and existed for 115 years.

As of December 31, 2021, Denmark Bancshares had $70,249,000 in assets. In the same period, Denmark State Bank reported assets totaling $685,749,000 and $621,153,000 in liabilities. The institution is a member of the Federal Deposit Insurance Corporation. Denmark State Bank was acquired by Manitowoc, Wisconsin-based Bank First in a deal announced January 19, 2022. The merger would result in a firm estimated to be worth approximately $3.6 billion. The acquisition was anticipated for regulatory approval on August 13, 2022, and successfully completed that weekend.

== History ==
Denmark State Bank was organized in 1909, with Mitchell Joannes of Green Bay as its first president. George DeBroux was appointed cashier, and he later became the bank's president. In 1969, the bank opened its first branch office in Bellevue, Wisconsin. In 1986, It acquired the Maribel-Whitelaw Bank, which added locations in Maribel, Wisconsin and Whitelaw, Wisconsin.

=== 1949 Bank Robbery ===
On March 3, 1949, three bank robbers walked into the Denmark State Bank and held the bank president, George DeBroux, at gunpoint, and placed nine other customers and employees in the open bank vault. The robbers made out with almost all of the $38,000 that the bank had on hand that day. Local residents formed an armed passey to catch the robbers. County authorities set up road blocks in a 50-mile radius. The Federal Bureau of Investigation became involved in the search, and with fingerprint analysis came up with a list of suspects. This was the first bank robbery in Brown County.

The FBI set up an operation to catch the ringleader, Walter Swiedarke, who owned a gas station and used car lot. An FBI agent bought gas from Swiedarke's station and forced him to make change, of which the bills were identified later by serial numbers as having been a part of the stolen money. The agent later went in to buy a car, to confirm that he had more bills, and while they were negotiating terms, the district attorney, two FBI agents, County Sheriff Zuidmulder, Green Bay police chief H.J. Bere, and several other police officers entered the office and arrested Swiedarke. The other accomplices were apprehended over the next few days.

== FDIC charter information ==
Denmark State Bank was FDIC insured from January 1, 1934, under certificate #13240, until it merged into Bank First, N.A. on August 12, 2022.
