= United Cooperative =

Agricultural Supply Cooperative

- Company type: Agricultural Cooperative
- Industry: Agricultural Supply and Retail
- Founded: 1936
- Headquarters: Beaver Dam, Wisconsin, United States
- Number of locations: 35
- Area served: Wisconsin, Illinois, Iowa, Michigan, and Minnesota
- Key people: David Cramer, CEO; Howard Bohl, Chairman of the Board
- Services: seed, feed, fertilizer, crop protectants, precision ag, livestock health, equine health, farm supplies, farm fuels, ethanol
- Revenue: ▲$672 million
- Number of employees: 500 (2011)
- Website: Official website

United Cooperative is an American agricultural supply cooperative based in Beaver Dam, Wisconsin. They supply feed, grain, agronomy, and energy products to customers.

== History ==
United Cooperative was incorporated on January 27, 1936.

In 1985, United Cooperative acquired Iron Ridge Cooperative.

In 1990, United Cooperative acquired Don's Elevator in Allenton, Wisconsin, and Hartford Elevator in Hartford, Wisconsin.

In 2012, United Cooperative acquired Pulaski Chase Cooperative of Pulaski, Wisconsin, Mid-Country Cooperative of Shawano, Wisconsin, and Cooperative Services of Denmark, Wisconsin.

In 2015, United Cooperative acquired AgVentures LLC, with locations in Coleman and Shawano, Wisconsin, and Grain Ventures LLC, with locations in Shawano and Oconto Falls, Wisconsin. These facilities have a combined storage capacity of 4 million bushels of grain.

In 2015, United Cooperative also acquired four locations from Archer Daniels Midland. These locations are in Auroraville, Oshkosh, Ripon, and Westfield, Wisconsin, and have a storage capacity of 13 million bushels.

Also in 2015, CropLife magazine ranked United Cooperative #29 on their list of the Top 100 Agronomy Companies. They also ranked #57 on the USDA's Top 100 Agricultural Cooperatives.

In 2017, United Cooperative merged with Greenville Cooperative of Greenville, Wis.

== Corporate governance ==
=== Headquarters ===
United Cooperative's corporate headquarters is located in Beaver Dam, Wisconsin. Their complex includes their corporate offices and feed storage.

=== Charitable activities ===
In 2014, United Cooperative partnered with Land O' Lakes, and donated $28,000 to Wisconsin food pantries.

In 2015, United Cooperative again partnered with Land O' Lakes, this time donating $37,000 to 34 food pantries in Wisconsin.

Also in 2015, United Cooperative donated over $31,000 to charities.

United Cooperative also awards scholarships to graduating high school seniors, which totaled over $40,000 in 2015.

== Subsidiaries ==
United Ethanol is a subsidiary of United Cooperative. United Ethanol was incorporated in 2007, and produces 3.9 million gallons of ethanol per month. In 2008, United Ethanol constructed a carbon dioxide processing facility, which is the byproduct of ethanol production. The carbon dioxide is then sold for use in food processing, beverage production, oil recovery, municipal water treatment, and chemical production. In 2011, United Ethanol constructed a corn oil extraction facility.
