= Danen Kane =

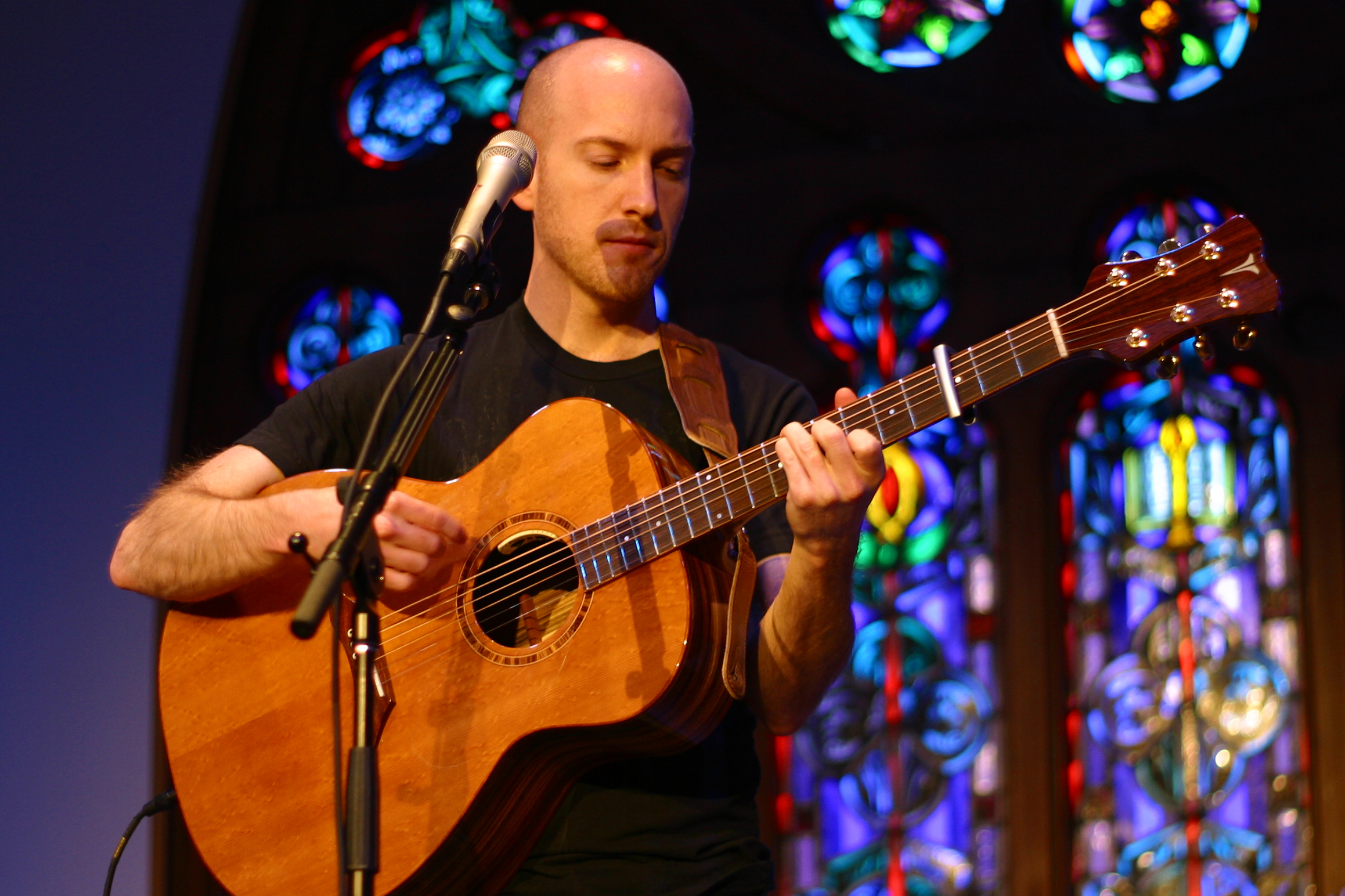
- Danen Kane performing in Milwaukee, Wisconsin at Epikos Church on May 7, 2012. (Photo by Neal Van Slett, Vesper Guitars)

Background information
- Born: Danen Patrick Kane; December 11, 1979 (age 46); Denmark, Wisconsin
- Origin: Appleton, Wisconsin
- Genres: CCM, alternative rock, worship
- Occupations: Singer, songwriter, worship leader
- Instruments: vocals, acoustic guitar
- Years active: 2003–present
- Label: Aeneas Records
- Website: danenkane.com

Danen Kane (born December 11, 1979) is an American contemporary Christian musician and worship leader. He has released five studio albums, Take Glory from Our Praise in 2003, Transparent in 2004, She in 2006, Love Is Waiting in 2011, and Flesh and Soul in 2015.

== Early life ==
Danen Patrick Kane was born on December 11, 1979, in Denmark, Wisconsin. He is the son of Clifford and Lois Kane. He became a believer in Jesus Christ when he was young; however, it was not until college that he participated in the music ministry as a worship leader with Campus Crusade For Christ. Kane went to college at the University of Wisconsin–Oshkosh, where he was frequently mistaken for a foreign exchange student. He was enrolled in the Letters and Sciences college, and graduated in 2003.

== Music career ==
His music recording career began in 2003, with the release, Take Glory from Our Praise, that he released independently, on Danen Kane Music. The subsequent release, Transparent, was released on September 1, 2004, independently. He released, She, on March 1, 2006, again with Danen Kane Music. His fourth release, an extended play, Awakening, was released in 2009. The fourth album, Love Is Waiting, was released on May 20, 2011, by Danen Kane Music. His first live album, Live at the OuterEdge, was released from Danen Kane Music, on September 1, 2012. He released, Flesh and Soul, on March 3, 2015, from Danen Kane Music.

== Personal life ==
Kane resides in Appleton, Wisconsin.

== Discography ==
Studio albums

- Take Glory from Our Praise (June 2003, Danen Kane/Aeneas Records)
- Transparent (September 1, 2004, Danen Kane/Aeneas Records)
- She (March 1, 2006, Danen Kane/Aeneas Records)
- Love Is Waiting (April 30, 2011, Danen Kane/Aeneas Records)
- Flesh and Soul (March 3, 2015, Danen Kane/Aeneas Records)

Live albums

- Live at the OuterEdge (September 1, 2012, Danen Kane/Aeneas Records)
- Live at Rock Garden Studio (2016, Danen Kane/Aeneas Records)

EPs

- Awakening (August 2009, Danen Kane, Aeneas Records)
