= Jeff Sutton =

American writer (1913–1979)

Jefferson Howard Sutton (July 25, 1913 – January 31, 1979) was an American writer who wrote 23 books of science fiction, war, political and juvenile fiction.

== Biography ==
Sutton was born on July 25, 1913, in Los Angeles, California. He began work at fourteen as an office boy in the editorial department of the Los Angeles Examiner, where both he and his father worked for many years. He was a staff photographer and writer with International News Photos from 1937 to 1940.

Sutton was in the United States Marine Corps from 1932 through 1936 and reenlisted at the outset of World War II, serving with the 2nd Marine Division in the South and Central Pacific areas. His novel The River owes much to his experience on Guadalcanal. He married Eugenia Geneva Hansen on February 1, 1941, and they had two children: Christopher and Gale.

Sutton did not immediately turn to writing after the war, but worked in a number of jobs, including as an assistant to San Diego Mayor Harley Knox. After receiving his master's degree in experimental psychology at San Diego State University, he worked as a research engineer in human factors engineering in the aerospace industry. He then worked in editorial public relations for General Dynamics, an experience he used when writing his novel The Missile Lords a few years later. As a human factors engineer working for Convair, he explored man's adaptation to machines and established his business as an editorial consultant to industry. Several years later he returned to writing.

== Writing ==
Sutton began publishing fiction in 1958. Throughout his writing career he remained a free-lance editorial consultant to aerospace industries and published articles in related professional magazines. He published 23 novels in more than 10 languages, including a number of science fiction, war, political, and juvenile books. In one of his interviews he said that writing came naturally to him. He wrote that his greatest interest had always been people and the settings in which they function. As a writer, he focused on subjects related to his earlier work – space, astronautics, war, newspapers – and on science fiction. Among his books about space exploration are Bombs in Orbit (1959), Spacehive (1960) and Apollo at Go (1963). Sutton's 1963 fictional look at the first Apollo crewed lunar landing prophetically set the historic event in July 1969 although he did get the date wrong by a few weeks, July 8 instead of the July 20 date that the real Apollo 11 landed on the Moon.

Jean Sutton helped edit fifteen of her husband's novels, starting with his first fiction book First on the Moon (1958). They first collaborated as coauthors on the juvenile book The Beyond (1968). They published some juvenile books as coauthors, The Programmed Man, Lord of the Stars and others. Three of them, Apollo at Go, Beyond Apollo and The Programmed Man, were Junior Literary Guild selections.
