= Devil's River State Trail =

State trail in Manitowoc County, Wisconsin, United States

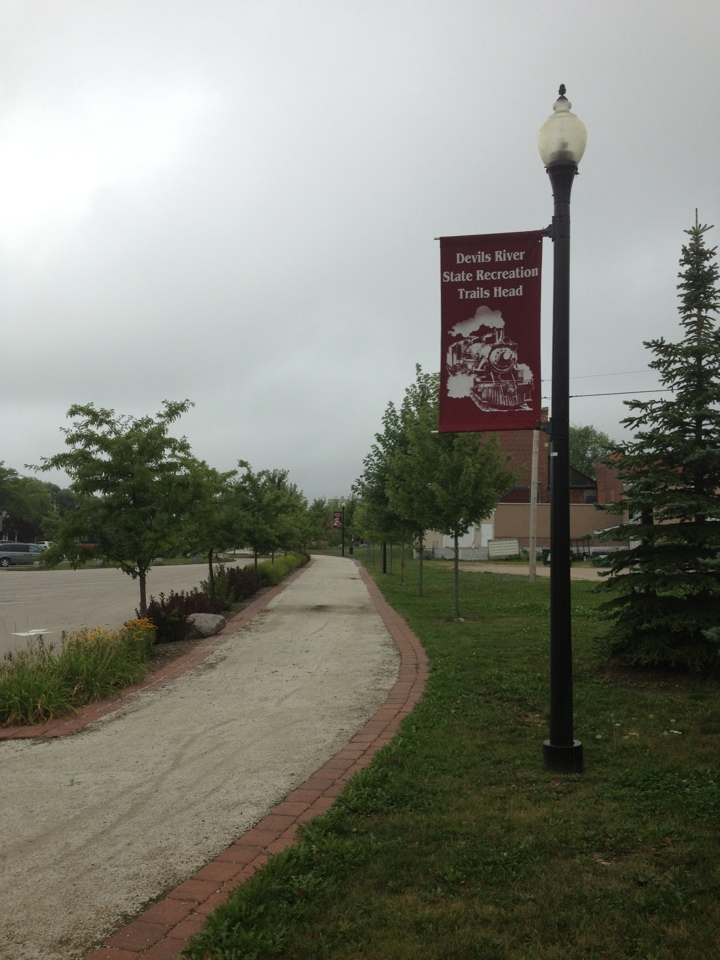
- Beginning of the Devil's River Trail
- Length: 14.24 mi (22.92 km)
- Location: Wisconsin, USA
- Designation: multi-use
- Trailheads: Denmark, Wisconsin and Rockwood, Wisconsin
- Difficulty: easy
- Surface: crushed limestone
- Maintained by: Wisconsin Department of Natural Resources
- Website: https://dnr.wisconsin.gov/topic/parks/devilsriver

Trail map
- Map

The Devil's River State Trail is a 14.24-mile (22.94 km) state-designated rail trail in Manitowoc County, Wisconsin. Parts of the trail are under construction as of early 2010. The trail is nearly paralleled by Interstate 43 for much of its route. The trail starts in the village park of Denmark, continuing through the village parks of both Maribel and Francis Creek, ending just north of Rockwood. The trail is scheduled to be expanded southwards to the city of Manitowoc.

== Route ==
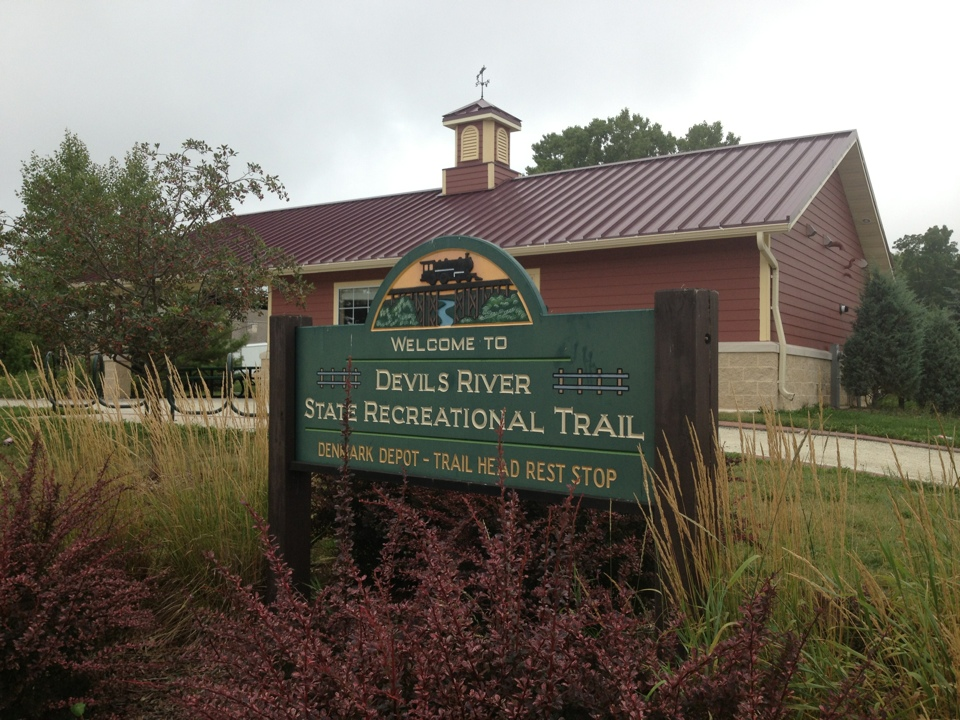
Devil's River Trailhead in Denmark, WI

The trail begins at the trailhead depot in downtown Denmark (44°20′58″N 87°49′45″W), and travels south, going through downtown Maribel, Francis Creek, and ending in Rockwood(44°10′05″N 87°41′54″W). Along the route, the trail crosses the Devil's River on a railroad trestle bridge that towers 100 feet above the river. Most of the route is flat, as it is built on an old railroad bed.

== Access ==
The trail is open to walkers, joggers, bicyclists, and pets on a leash. In winter, the trail is open to cross-country skiing, snowshoeing, and snowmobiling.
