= School District of Denmark, Wisconsin =

School district in Wisconsin, United States

Coordinates: 44°21′15.7″N 87°49′32.9″W

School District of Denmark

Location
- 450 North Wall Street, Denmark, WI 54208 Northeast Wisconsin United States

District information
- Type: Public school district
- Grades: Pre-kindergarten to 12
- Established: 1917
- Superintendent: Tony Klaubauf
- Schools: 4

Students and staff
- Students: 1,498 (2013–2014)
- Athletic conference: Bay
- District mascot: Vikings
- Colors: Purple and gold

Other information
- Website: www.denmark.k12.wi.us

The School District of Denmark is a public school district in Denmark, Wisconsin serving grades Pre-K through 12. The enrollment for the 2011-2012 school year was 1,498 students. The district was created in 1917.

== Governance ==
The school district is governed by a school board with five members. The district is overseen by a superintendent, Luke Goral.

== Schools ==
=== Denmark Early Childhood Center ===
The Denmark Early Childhood Center houses a half-day four-year-old kindergarten program and a full-day five-year-old kindergarten program. The building was the junior high school until 1993, when a new middle school was constructed. It was then converted to the Early Childhood Center, and more classroom space was added.

=== Denmark Elementary School ===
The Denmark Elementary School was built in 1970. It houses first grade through fifth. Denmark Elementary has a special education program. The school's programs and clubs for students include Destination Imagination, Safety Patrol, Student Council, and Battle of the Books.

=== Denmark Middle School ===
Built in 1993, Denmark Middle School houses grades six through eight. In addition to the core classes of English, science, social studies, and math the school offers foreign language, technical education, and music. Denmark Middle School's clubs include Future Farmers of America, Battle of the Books, Destination Imagination, and a forensics team.

=== Denmark High School ===
Denmark High School offers Advanced Placement courses including English, calculus, statistics, biology, American history, European history, and Spanish language. The school also works with the University of Wisconsin-Green Bay's & Northeast Wisconsin Technical College's College Credit in High School program, offering four of the available courses. Other options include cooperative education programs, youth apprenticeship programs and online courses.

The school has a music program that offers chorus and band to students in the general scholastic program.

Denmark High School's sports include baseball, softball, boys' and girls' basketball, wrestling, cross country, track and field, football, boys' and girls' soccer, boys' and girls' golf, and girls' volleyball. The school participates in Division 3 of the Wisconsin Interscholastic Athletic Association as a member of the Bay Conference.

=== Denmark Community School ===
Denmark Community School, which was created in 2012 and serves grades 8-12, is a public charter school that focuses on project-based learning. The school is designed to enhance collaboration and independence, and uses modern technology that allows students to document and analyze field work and create and design professional level multimedia projects.
