= Theodore Marcus Hansen =

Danish-American Lutheran pastor, educator, and church leader

- Born: May 25, 1886
- Died: February 5, 1973 (aged 86)
- Other names: TM Hansen
- Education: Dana College; University of Copenhagen
- Church: United Danish Evangelical Lutheran Church
- Ordained: 1915
- Congregations served: 1929–1942: Trinity Lutheran and Calvary Lutheran, Denmark, Wisconsin 1942–48: Saron Lutheran, Calgary, Alberta Our Savior's Lutheran, Edgewater, British Columbia St. Paul's Lutheran, Olds, Alberta 1948–52: Our Savior's Lutheran, Owatonna, Minnesota Trinity Lutheran, Blooming Prairie, Minnesota 1952–56: Ansgar Lutheran, Winnipeg, Manitoba 1956–58: Ebenezer Lutheran, McCabe, Montana Brorson Lutheran, Sidney, Montana
- Offices held: President, Dana College & Trinity Seminary
- Title: Ordained Pastor, District President

Theodore Marcus Hansen (May 25, 1886 – February 5, 1973) was a Danish-American Lutheran pastor, educator, and church leader. Ordained as a pastor in the United Evangelical Lutheran Church (UDELC) in 1915, Theodore Marcus (commonly known as TM Hansen) served eleven Lutheran congregations. He was also President of Dana College (1925–29) and Trinity Seminary, and served in many leadership positions in the UDELC.

== Education ==
=== Training for ordination ===
Hansen's preparation for the ministry began in 1905. Along with his younger brother Henry, Hansen enrolled in the UDELC school in Blair, Nebraska (later known as Dana College). After four years of preliminary studies in Blair, Hansen went on to study at the University of Nebraska from 1909 to 1911.

In 1911, Hansen returned to Blair to begin his studies at the seminary of the UDELC, Trinity Seminary. At that time, instruction at Trinity was entirely in Danish. Thus, after two years at Trinity, Hansen went to Maywood Seminary in Chicago (later known as the Lutheran School of Theology at Chicago) in order to gain proficiency at preaching in English. In 1915, Hansen was awarded a Bachelor of Divinity degree from Maywood.

=== Graduate studies ===
In 1919, the UDELC was looking for a new professor Trinity Seminary. Up to this point, all the school's professors had been born and trained in Denmark, and there was a desire to have an American born professor. Hansen was selected by the church to be trained for this position.

By applying credits he earned at Dana, Trinity, and Maywood, Hansen was able to earn a Bachelor of Arts degree in one year from Saint Olaf College. Thus, in 1920, Hansen entered the Graduate Studies program of the University of Minnesota. After just one year there, Hansen went to Europe to complete his studies. Staying with family in Denmark, Hansen studied at the University of Copenhagen and University of Tübingen.

Having completed the coursework for a Master of Arts degree (although he never wrote a thesis), Hansen returned to America to begin teaching at Dana College and Trinity Seminary in 1921.

== Pastorates ==
Theodore Marcus Hansen was ordained by the United Danish Evangelical Church in 1915 at the annual convention in Luck, Wisconsin. His first call, from 1915 to 1919, was to serve Bethlehem Lutheran Church in Royal, Iowa. Near the end of this first pastorate, he served as a civilian chaplain at Fort Riley, believed by many to be ground zero of the American outbreak of the Spanish flu.

On leaving Dana College and Trinity Seminary in 1929, Hansen returned to pastoral ministry. Over the next twenty-nine years, he served as pastor of 10 congregations. They were

- 1929–42

Trinity Lutheran and Calvary Lutheran
Denmark, Wisconsin

- 1942–48

Saron Lutheran (Calgary, Alberta)
Our Savior’s Lutheran (Edgewater, British Columbia)
St. Paul’s Lutheran (Olds, Alberta)

- 1948–52

Our Savior’s Lutheran (Owatonna, Minnesota)
Trinity Lutheran (Blooming Prairie, Minnesota)

- 1952–56

Ansgar Lutheran (Winnipeg, Manitoba)

- 1956–58

Ebenezer Lutheran (McCabe, Montana)
Brorson Lutheran (Sidney, Montana)

After his retirement in 1958 to Hastings, Nebraska, Hansen served as the chaplain to the retirement community he lived in, and occasionally served as an interim pastor to nearby congregations.

== Academia and church leadership ==
In 1921, Hansen began teaching at Dana College and Trinity Seminary, the educational institutions of the United Evangelical Lutheran Church in Blair, Nebraska. He served on the faculty of those institutions from 1921 to 1925, teaching primarily at the college. In 1925, there was a major turnover in the faculty and administration of Trinity Seminary.

The convention of the UDELC (which had paid for Hansen's graduate education) asked Hansen to fill the vacant position of President of Dana and Trinity. He served in that capacity from 1925 to 1929. After 1929, Hansen continued to guide Dana and Trinity, serving as the chairman of the board of directors for both institutions from 1929 to 1942.

In the UDELC, the judicatory was known as the District, and each district was headed by a District President (a position analogous to that of bishop in other churches). Hansen served as District President of the Wisconsin District (1938–42) and of the Western Canada District (1945–48). He was also vice-president of the Western North Dakota/Montana District (1956–57).

In 1960, the UDELC ceased to exist when it became a part of the newly formed American Lutheran Church. Prior to the formation of the American Lutheran Church, Hansen served on the Joint Union Committee, which helped to shape what this new Lutheran church would look like.
