= Rockwood, Wisconsin =

- Unincorporated community
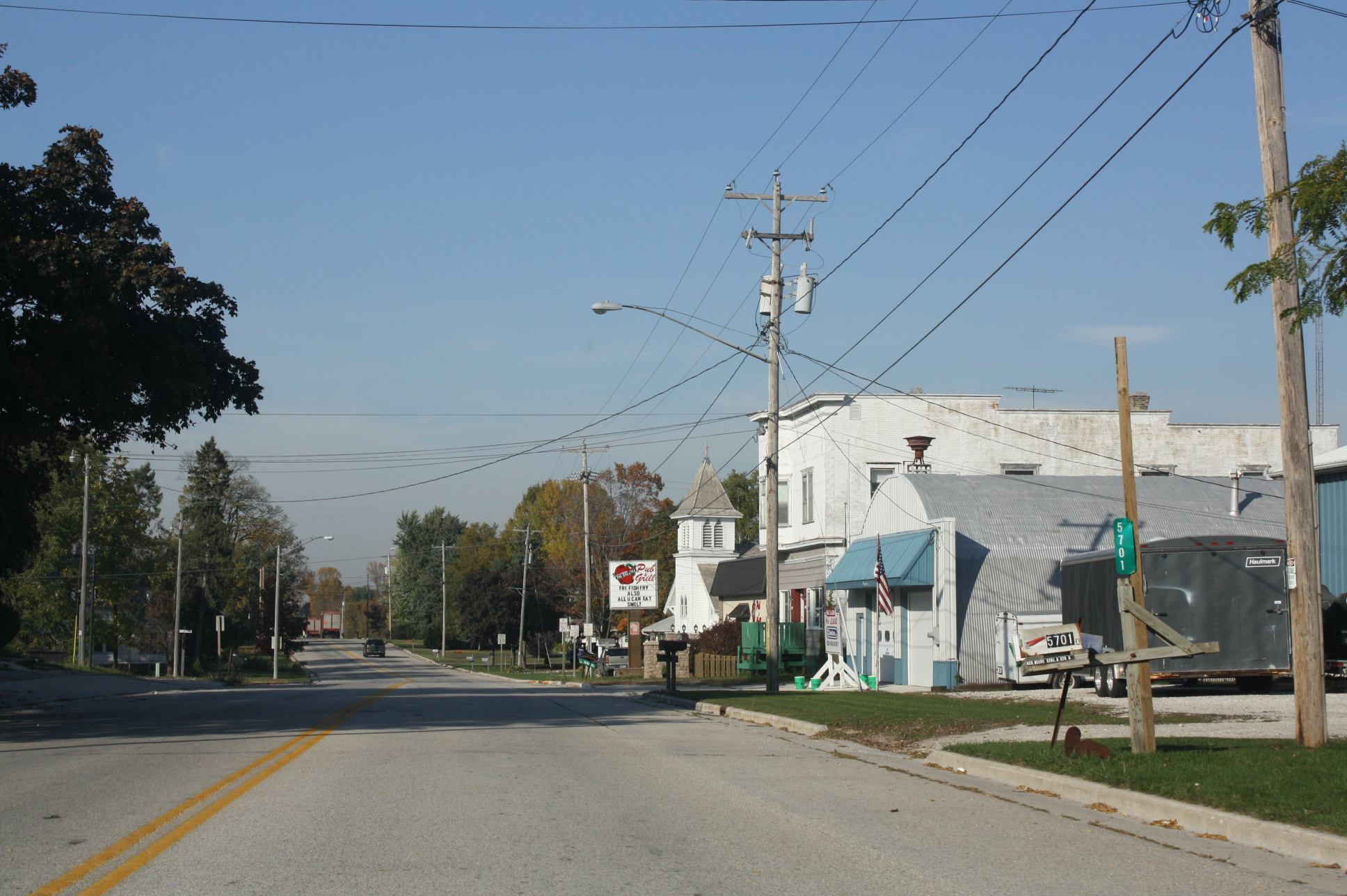
- Looking north in Rockwood on County R

- Location within Wisconsin Location within the United States
- Coordinates: 44°10′05″N 87°42′20″W
- Country: United States
- State: Wisconsin
- County: Manitowoc
- Elevation: 692 ft (211 m)
- Time zone: UTC-6 (Central (CST))
  - Summer (DST): UTC-5 (CDT)
- Area code: 920
- GNIS feature ID: 1572493

Rockwood is an unincorporated community located in the town of Kossuth, Manitowoc County, Wisconsin, United States. Rockwood is located on County Highway R, approximately 6 miles (9.7 km) north-northwest of downtown Manitowoc. U.S. Route 141 passed through the community before it was decommissioned in 1981 after being replaced by Interstate 43 as the major route between Green Bay and Milwaukee. US 141 was renamed as County R.

== Points of interest ==
- Devil's River State Trail

== Images ==
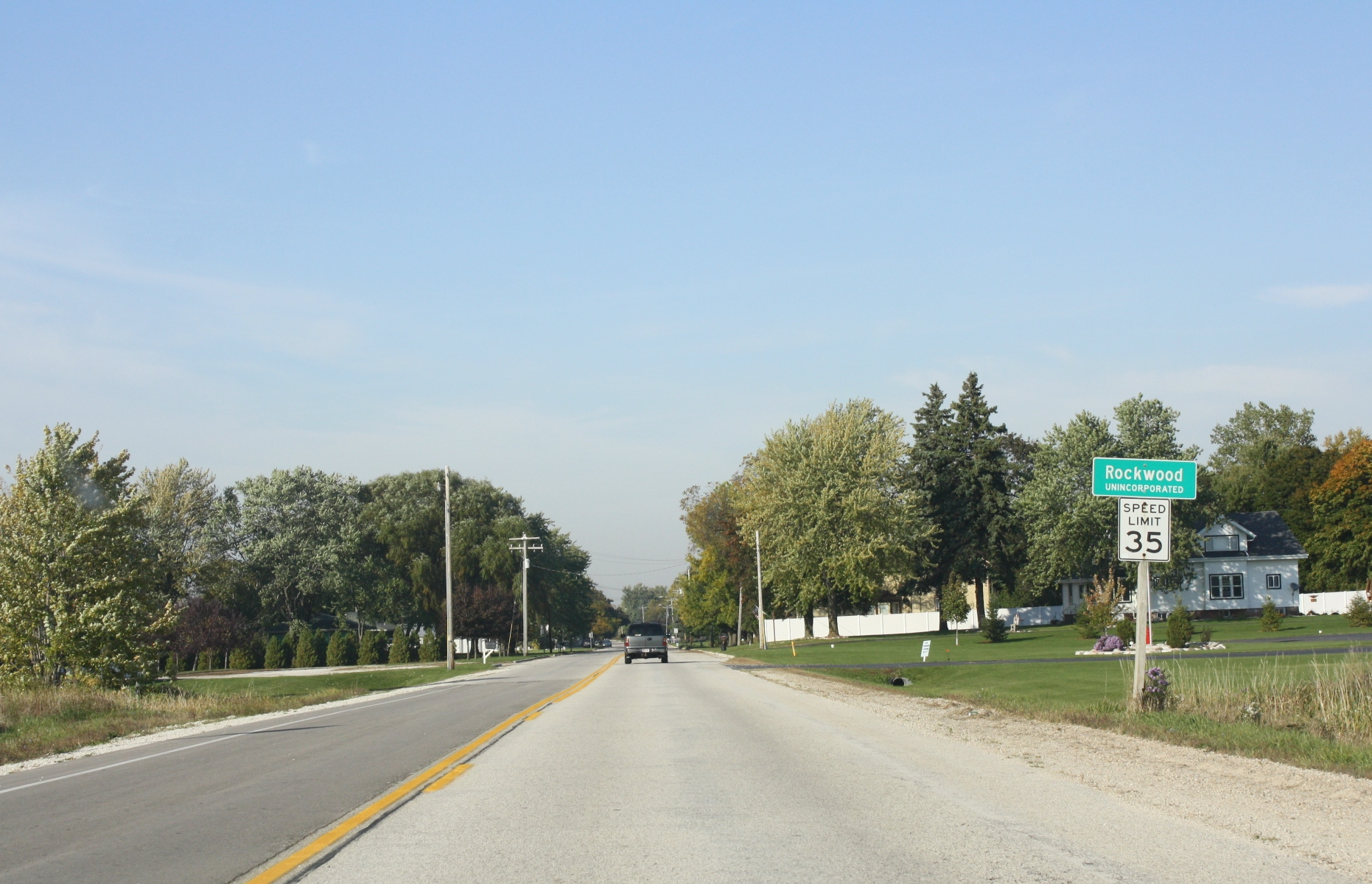
Sign on County R

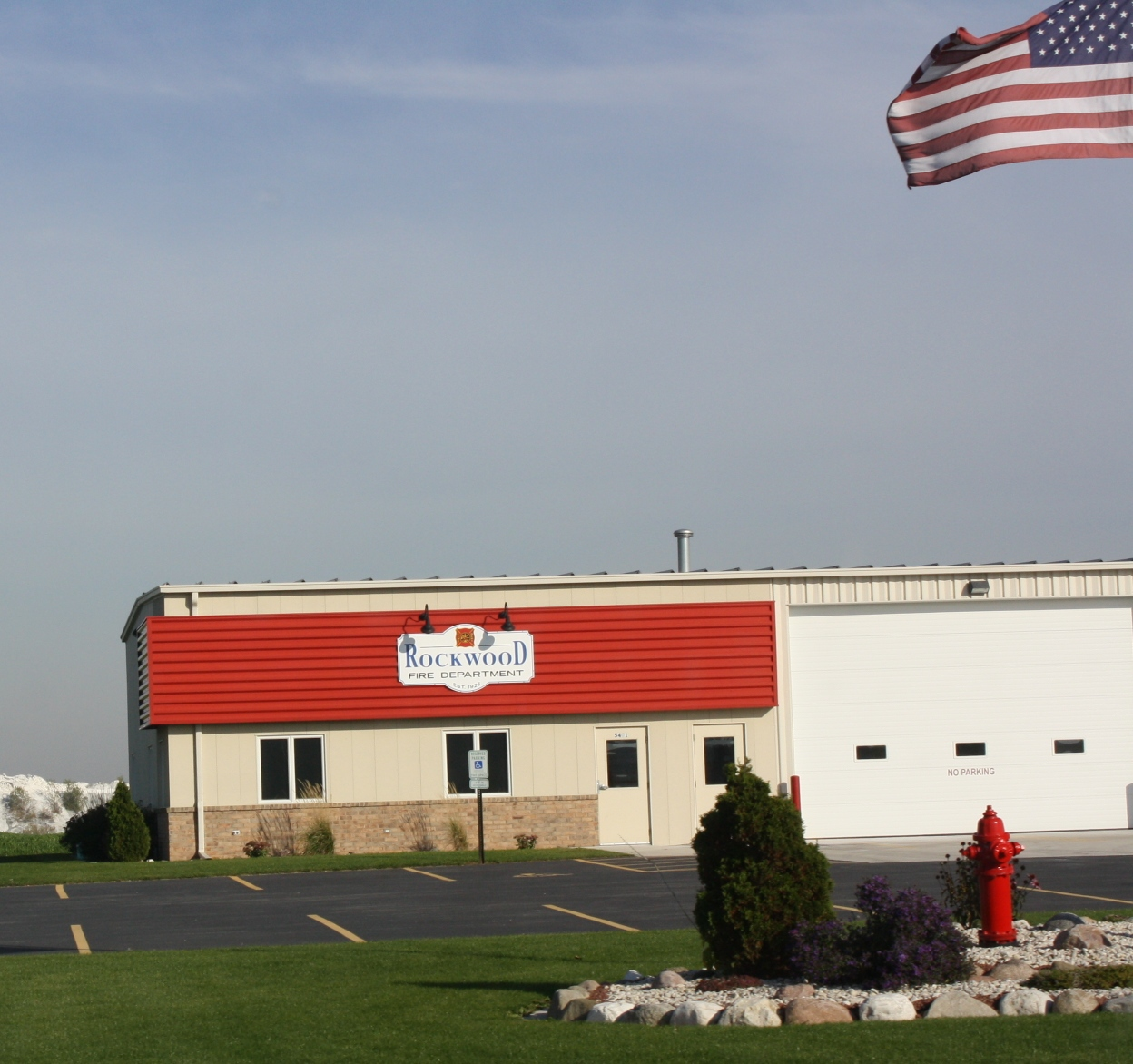
Rockwood Fire Department

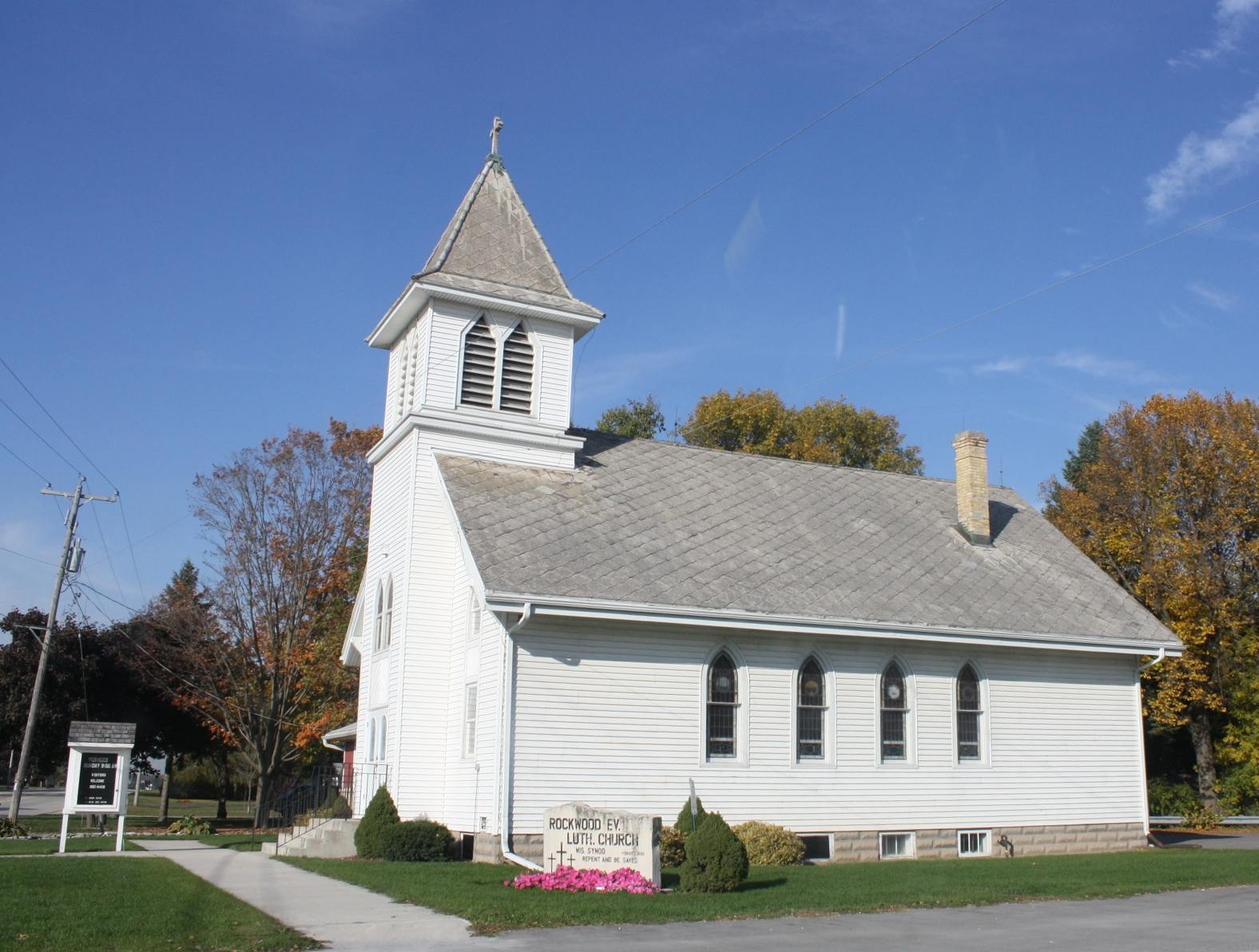
Rockwood Evangelical Lutheran Church
