= Jean Sutton =

American novelist

- Born: Eugenia Geneva Hensen; 5 July 1916; Denmark, Wisconsin
- Died: 29 May 2003 (aged 86)
- Spouse: Jefferson Howard Sutton
- Writing career
- Language: English
- Genre: Juvenile science fiction

Eugenia Geneva "Jean" Sutton (July 5, 1917 – May 29, 2003) was an American science fiction author.

== Life ==
Eugenia Geneva Hansen was born on 5 July 1917. She married Jefferson Howard Sutton (1913–1979), with whom she wrote several science fiction novels for older children (juveniles). She wrote from 1950 to 1975, assisting her husband on several titles, and from 1967 was also named as coauthor.

== Books (written 1965–1975) ==
The science fiction books were beloved by young teenagers; most however have been out of print since the early 1970s.

War - Novel about Marine's battle for the Matanikau River - Guadalcanal:

- The River, 1966 (a forgotten squad of marines battles at a river)

Teenage-Oriented (Juvenile) Science Fiction novels:

- The Beyond (people transcend to a Small Magellanic Cloud)
- The Programmed Man (3 way spy novel with empire, telepaths, and breakaway star group)
- Lord of the Stars (orphan on a planet circling an emerald Green sun defeats alien invasion)
- Alien From The Stars (alien crash lands on Earth)
- The Boy Who Had the Power (boy has memory crystal)

=== The Beyond (1967) ===
Plot Summary: An agent, sent to a distant planet where those with telepathic powers are banished, and ordered to find the person with the ability to move objects by thought, discovers to his horror that he is telepathic.

=== The Programmed Man (1968) ===
The reported power of the N-bomb aboard a destroyer spaceship preserves peace for years in the federated solar systems until enemy teleporters discover the bomb does not exist.

=== Lord of the Stars (1969) ===
Prologue: "Gultur, Lord of the Stars, knew his race was destined to conquer the Universe, for such was ordained when life first emerged from the slate-gray seas of Munga. He, himself, had decimated a score of worlds. But then, at the brink of his greatest victory, he encountered an alien youth who dwelt alone on the planet of an emerald sun."

Danny, an Earth-born child, is sent to the distant planet Wenda by his parents shortly before their spacecraft is destroyed. There, he is joined by Zandro and his mysterious “no-form,” a being that exists beyond conventional physical form. Together, they become the central figures of a thought-provoking science-fiction adventure. Written by the husband-and-wife team behind The Beyond and The Programmed Man, the novel combines imaginative world-building with speculative ideas about identity, existence, and the nature of life.[1]

=== Alien from the Stars (1970) ===
The sole survivor of a space wreck is sought by a variety of earth agents whom he has little trouble eluding.

=== The Boy Who Had the Power (1971) ===
Plot Summary: A boy who has lost his memory is a herder on a remote planet until a mysterious man gives him a beautiful stone to help him remember. Published by Putnam Books.

== Sources ==
- Clute, John; Peter Nicholls (1995). The Encyclopedia of Science Fiction. New York: St. Martin's Press. p. 1386. ISBN 0-312-13486-X.
- Nicholls, Peter (1979). The Encyclopedia of Science Fiction. St Albans, Hertfordshire, UK: Granada Publishing Ltd. p. 672. ISBN 0-586-05380-8.
