= Maribel, Wisconsin =

- Village
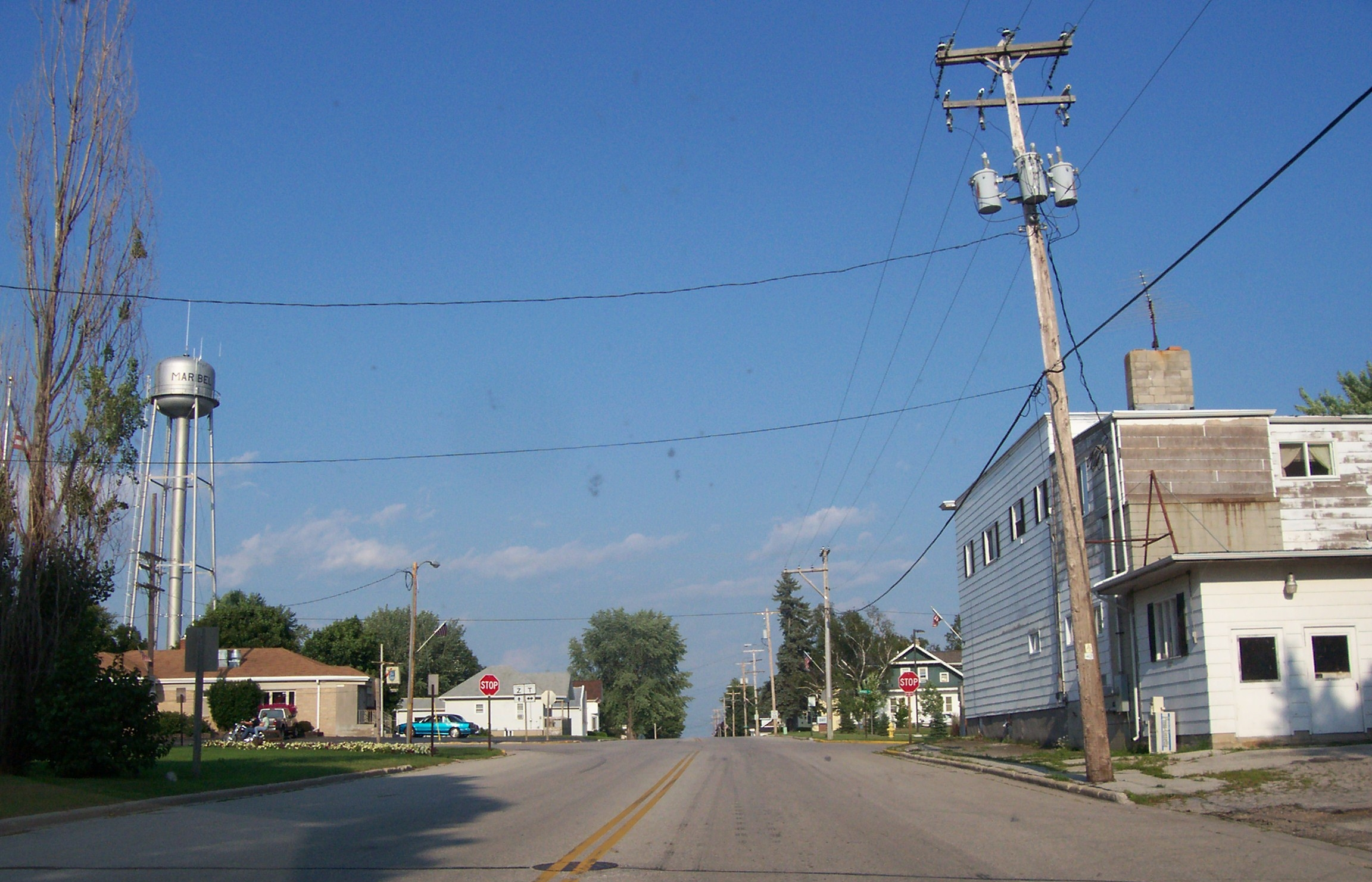
- Downtown Maribel

- Location of Maribel in Manitowoc County, Wisconsin.
- Coordinates: 44°16′35″N 87°48′26″W
- Country: United States
- State: Wisconsin
- County: Manitowoc

Area
  - Total: 1.15 sq mi (2.97 km^{2})
  - Land: 1.14 sq mi (2.96 km^{2})
  - Water: 0.0039 sq mi (0.01 km^{2})
- Elevation: 860 ft (262 m)

Population (2020)
  - Total: 336
  - Density: 290.5/sq mi (112.17/km^{2})
- Time zone: UTC-6 (Central (CST))
  - Summer (DST): UTC-5 (CDT)
- Area code: 920
- FIPS code: 55-49250
- GNIS feature ID: 1569032

Maribel is a village in Manitowoc County, Wisconsin, United States. The population was 336 at the 2020 census.

== History ==
A post office called Maribel has been in operation since 1837. The community took its name from a nearby mineral spring.

== Geography ==
Maribel is located at 44°16′35″N 87°48′26″W (44.2763830 -87.8073129).

According to the United States Census Bureau, the village has a total area of 1.17 square miles (3.03 km^{2}), all land.

== Highways ==
- WIS 147 begins on the eastern edge of the village and continues to Two Rivers.
- Interstate 43 northbound leads to Green Bay, while southbound leads to Manitowoc and Milwaukee.

== Demographics ==
Historical population
Census	Pop.	Note	%±
1970	316		—
1980	363		14.9%
1990	372		2.5%
2000	264		−29.0%
2010	351		33.0%
2020	336		−4.3%
U.S. Decennial Census

=== 2010 census ===
As of the census of 2010, there were 351 people, 141 households, and 105 families living in the village. The population density was 300.0 inhabitants per square mile (115.8/km^{2}). There were 144 housing units at an average density of 123.1 per square mile (47.5/km^{2}). The racial makeup of the village was 99.1% White, 0.3% Native American, and 0.6% from two or more races. Hispanic or Latino people of any race were 0.3% of the population.

There were 141 households, of which 35.5% had children under the age of 18 living with them, 60.3% were married couples living together, 9.2% had a female householder with no husband present, 5.0% had a male householder with no wife present, and 25.5% were non-families. 20.6% of all households were made up of individuals, and 8.5% had someone living alone who was 65 years of age or older. The average household size was 2.49 and the average family size was 2.84.

The median age in the village was 40.6 years. 24.2% of residents were under the age of 18; 7.5% were between the ages of 18 and 24; 25.1% were from 25 to 44; 26.9% were from 45 to 64; and 16.2% were 65 years of age or older. The gender makeup of the village was 48.7% male and 51.3% female.

=== 2000 census ===
As of the census of 2000, there were 264 people, 99 households, and 72 families living in the village. The population density was 225.3 people per square mile (87.1/km^{2}). There were 100 housing units at an average density of 85.3 per square mile (33.0/km^{2}). The racial makeup of the village was 96.21% White, 0.76% Native American, 0.38% from other races, and 2.65% from two or more races. Hispanic or Latino people of any race were 0.38% of the population.

There were 99 households, out of which 40.4% had children under the age of 18 living with them, 62.6% were married couples living together, 9.1% had a female householder with no husband present, and 26.3% were non-families. 23.2% of all households were made up of individuals, and 16.2% had someone living alone who was 65 years of age or older. The average household size was 2.67 and the average family size was 3.04.

In the village, the population was spread out, with 29.9% under the age of 18, 5.3% from 18 to 24, 31.4% from 25 to 44, 20.5% from 45 to 64, and 12.9% who were 65 years of age or older. The median age was 36 years. For every 100 females, there were 91.3 males. For every 100 females age 18 and over, there were 81.4 males.

The median income for a household in the village was $45,938, and the median income for a family was $52,679. Males had a median income of $36,375 versus $23,036 for females. The per capita income for the village was $17,177. About 4.8% of families and 7.0% of the population were below the poverty line, including 8.8% of those under the age of eighteen and 11.8% of those age 65 or over.

== Education ==
Maribel is served by the School District of Denmark, Wisconsin.

St. John's Lutheran School is a Christian Pre-K-8 school of the Wisconsin Evangelical Lutheran Synod in Maribel.

== Points of interest ==
- Cherney Maribel Caves County Park
- Devil's River State Trail

== Images ==
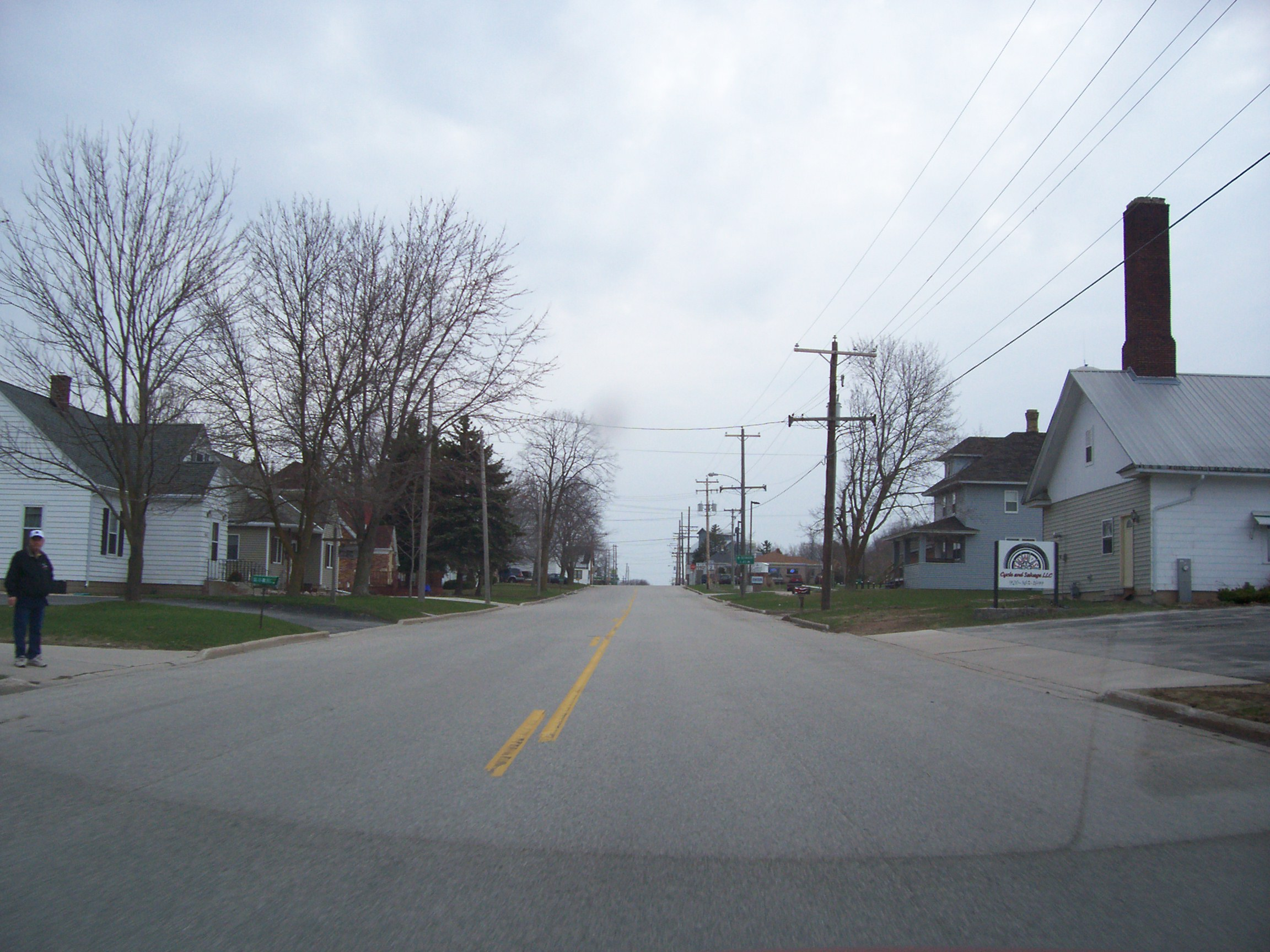
Looking north at downtown Maribel

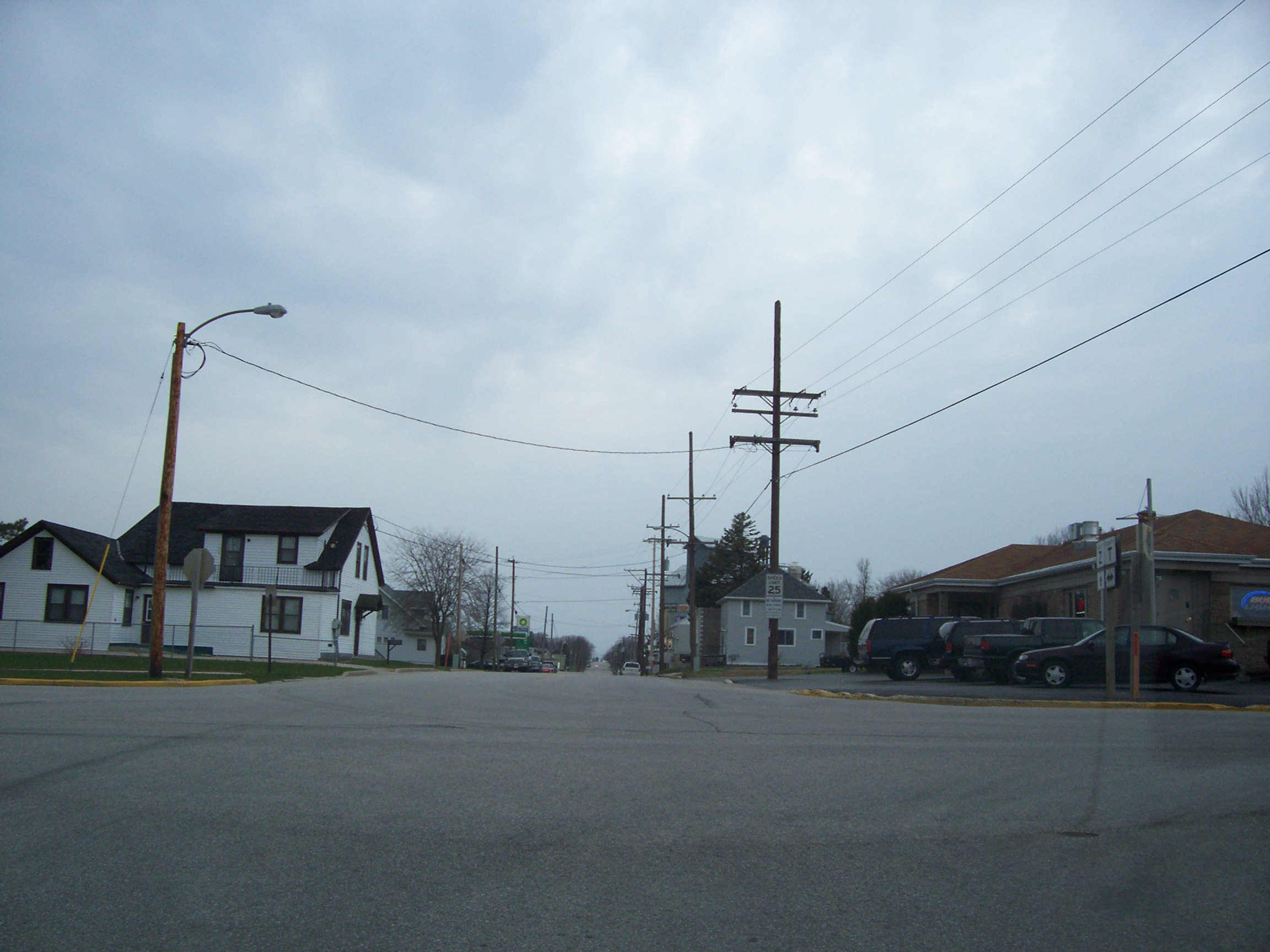
Looking north at downtown Maribel

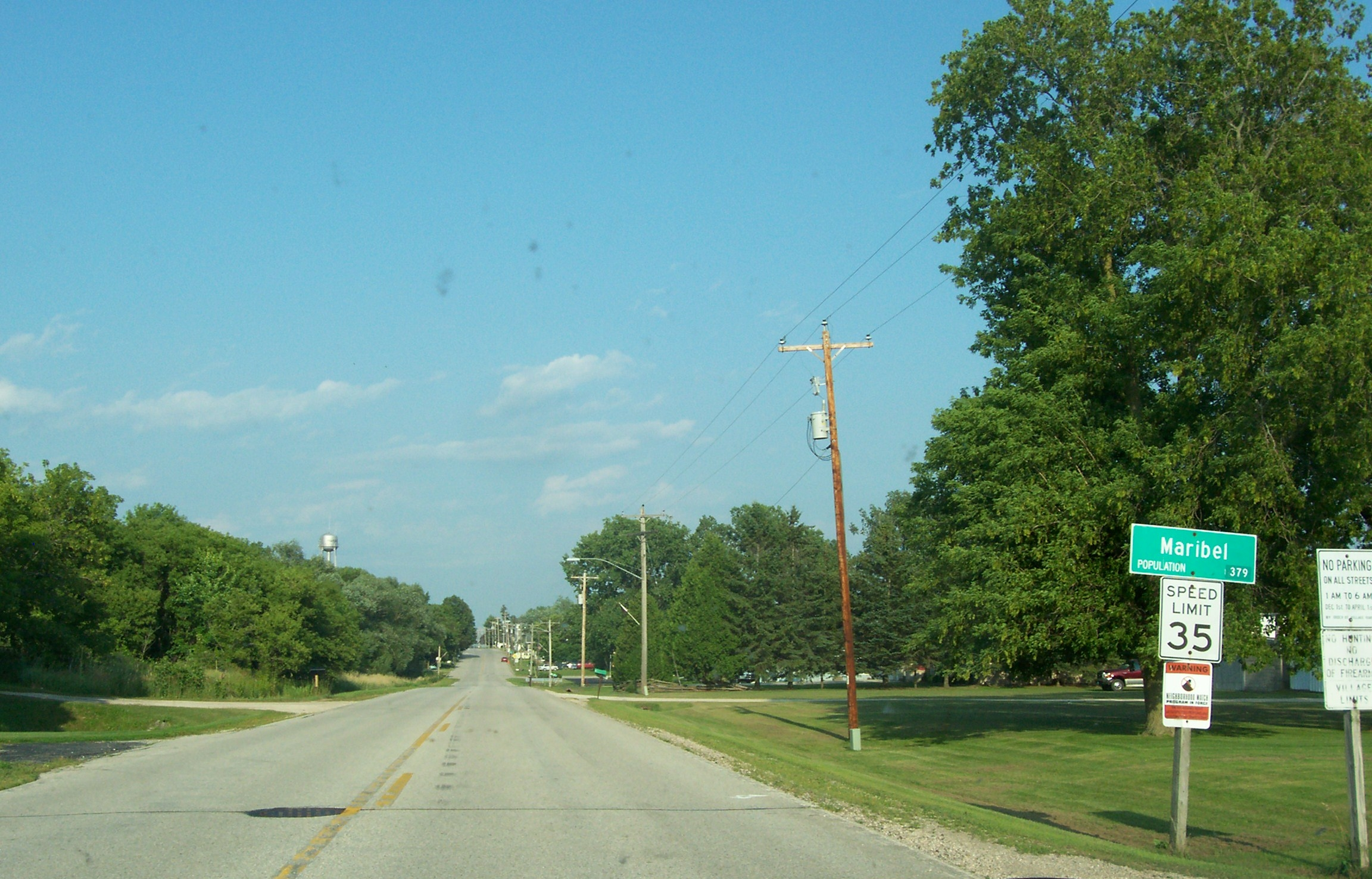
Looking east at the Maribel sign

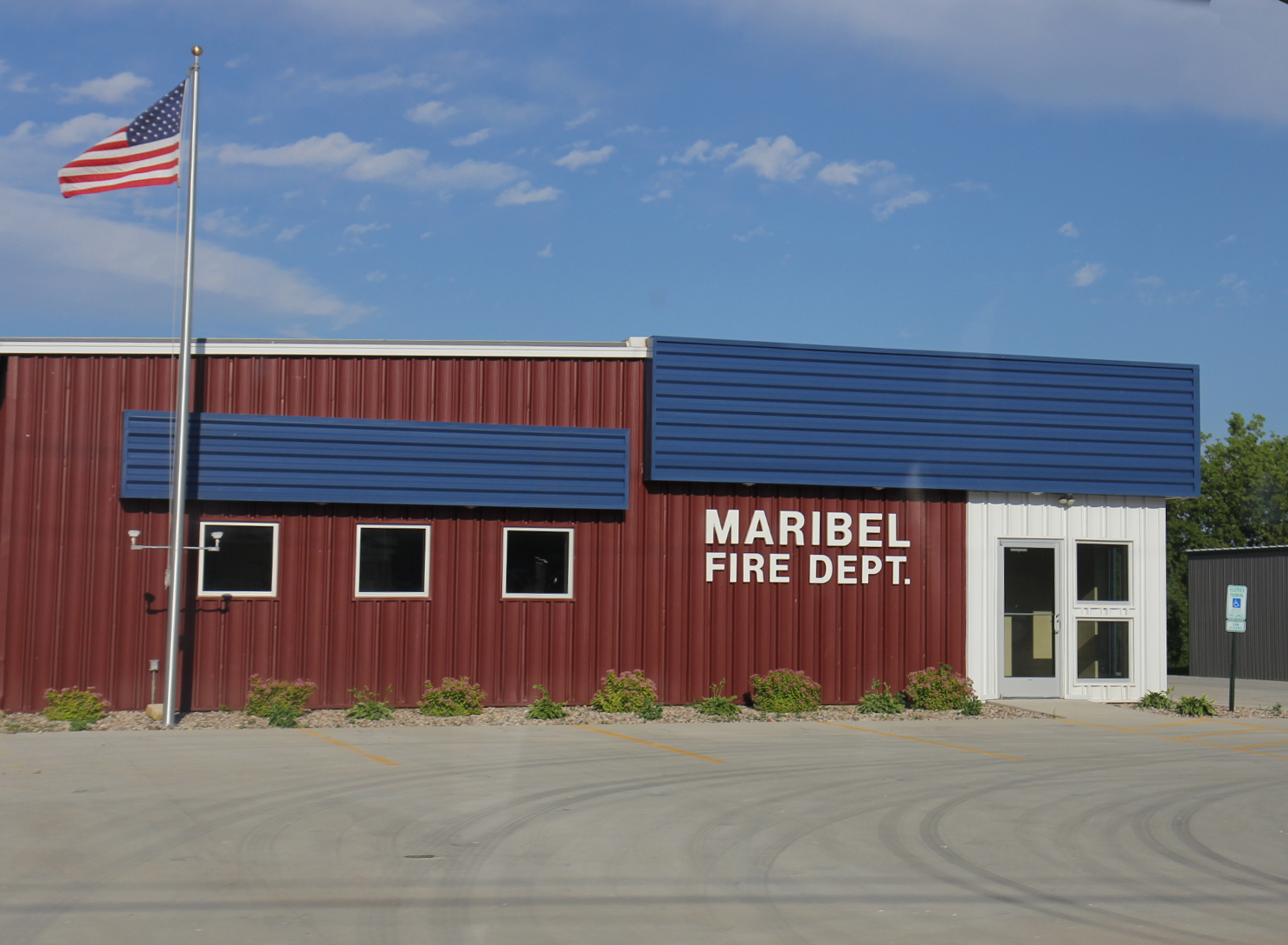
Fire department

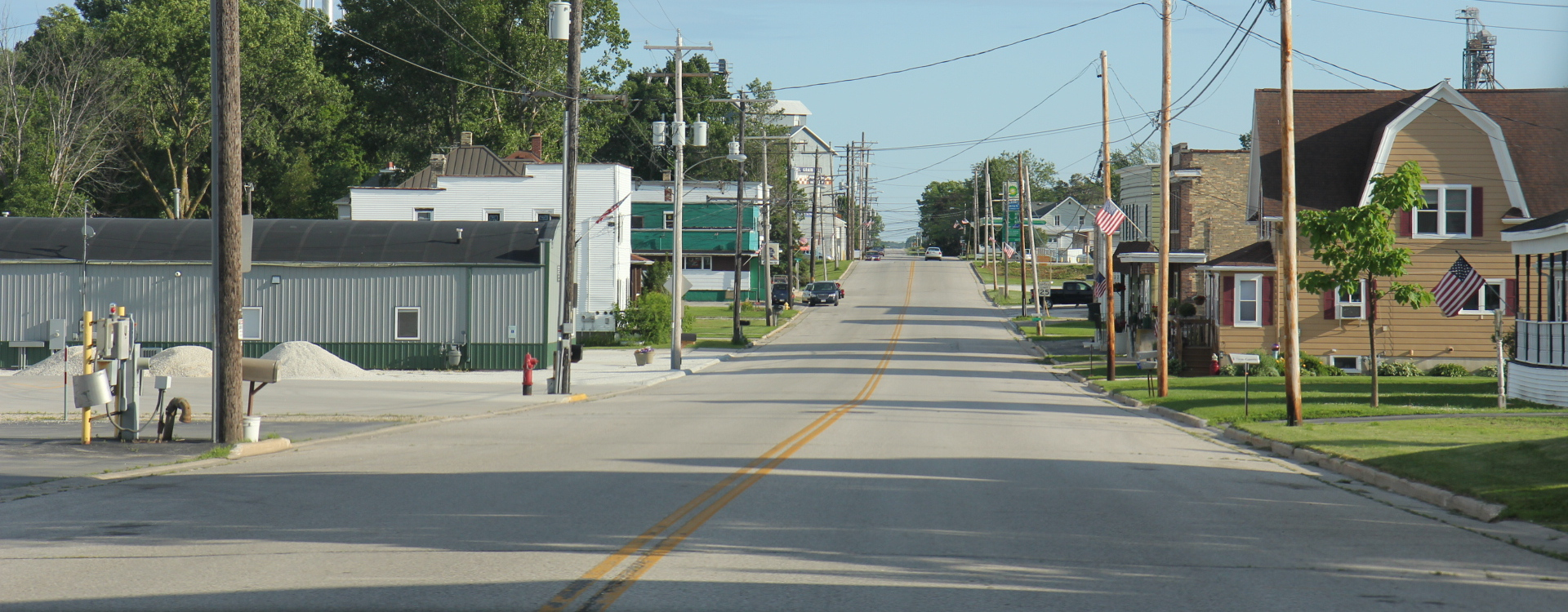
Looking south on County T

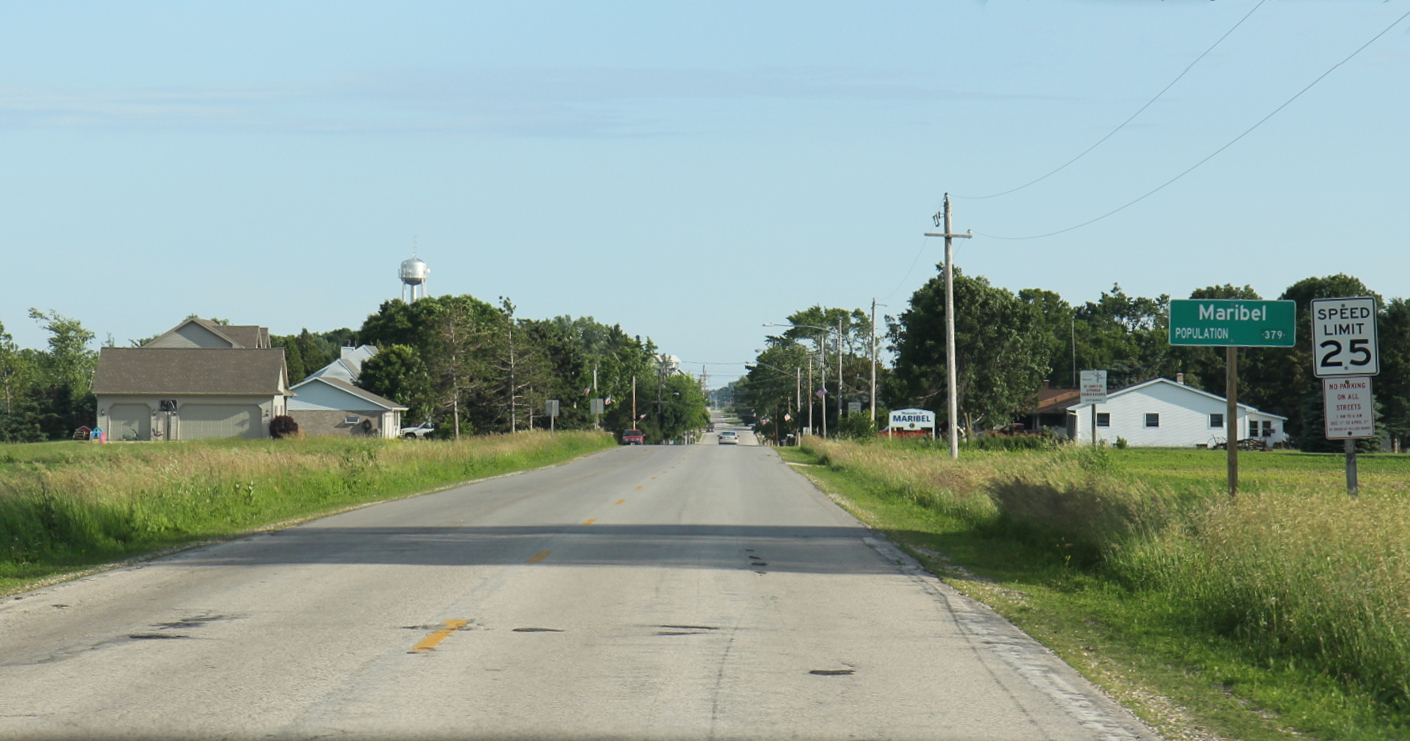
Looking south at the Maribel sign
