= Cooperstown (disambiguation) =

Cooperstown, New York is a village in and county seat of Otsego County, New York, United States.

Cooperstown may also refer to:

== Places ==
=== Bahamas ===
- Coopers Town, Abaco, Bahamas

=== United States ===
- Cooperstown, Illinois
- Cooperstown, New Jersey
- Cooperstown, North Dakota
- Cooperstown, Pennsylvania
- Cooperstown, Wisconsin, a town
  - Cooperstown (community), Wisconsin, an unincorporated community
- Cooperstown Township, Brown County, Illinois

== Other uses ==
- USS Cooperstown, a United States Navy ship
- Cooperstown (film), a 1993 American drama film

== See also ==
- Cooperstown Cocktail (cocktail), an alcoholic drink
- Cooperstown cocktail, a combination of pharmacological drugs
- Cooperton, Oklahoma
- Coopertown (disambiguation)
- National Baseball Hall of Fame and Museum, which is in Cooperstown, New York and the word is often used as a shorthand or metonym
