= Francis Creek =

Francis Creek may refer to:

- Francis Creek, Wisconsin, a village in Manitowoc County, Wisconsin
- Francis Creek (Wisconsin), a stream in Manitowoc County, Wisconsin
