= Franklin, Manitowoc County, Wisconsin =

Franklin, Wisconsin
- Town
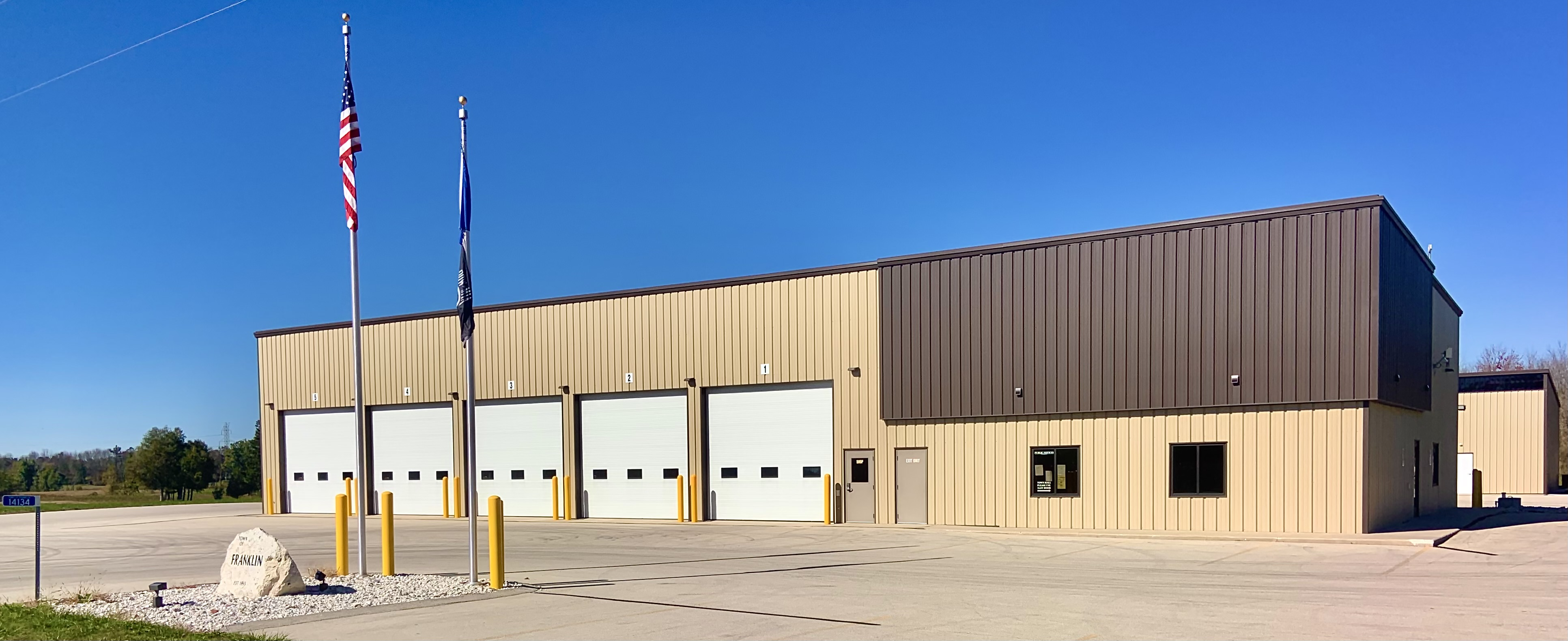
- Town hall

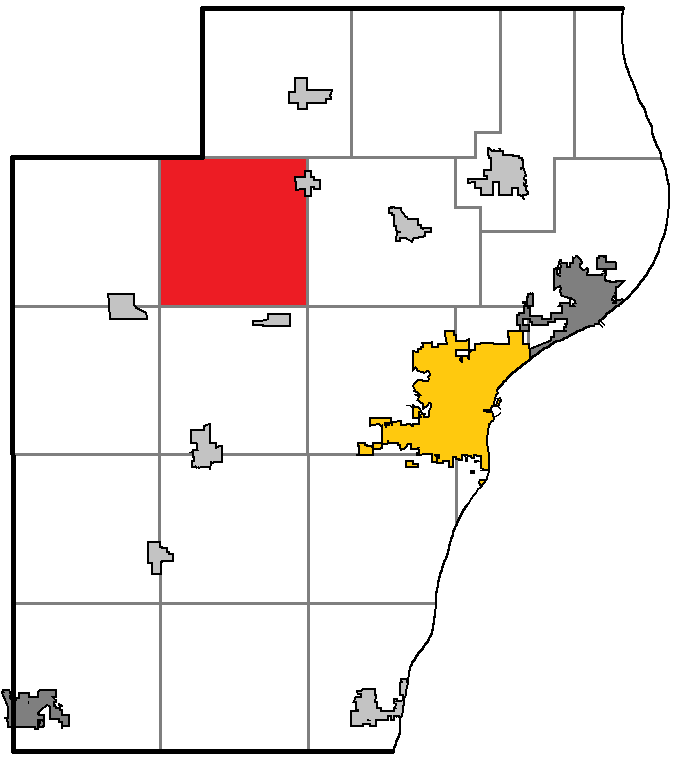
- Location of Franklin, within Manitowoc County
- Coordinates: 44°11′46″N 87°51′25″W
- Country: United States
- State: Wisconsin
- County: Manitowoc

Area
  - Total: 36.2 sq mi (93.7 km^{2})
  - Land: 36.2 sq mi (93.7 km^{2})
  - Water: 0.039 sq mi (0.1 km^{2})
- Elevation: 830 ft (253 m)

Population (2020)
  - Total: 1,250
  - Density: 34.6/sq mi (13.3/km^{2})
- Time zone: UTC-6 (Central (CST))
  - Summer (DST): UTC-5 (CDT)
- Area code: 920
- FIPS code: 55-27275
- GNIS feature ID: 1583233
- Website: https://townoffranklin-wi.com/

Franklin is a town in Manitowoc County, Wisconsin, United States. The population was 1,250 at the 2020 census.

== Communities ==
- Maple Grove is an unincorporated community located mostly west of the intersection of County Road G and Taus Road.
- Menchalville is an unincorporated community located at the intersection of County Road K and County Road NN/Menchalville Road west of Kellnersville.
- Reifs Mills is an unincorporated community on Reifs Mills Road east of County Road T. The community was named after the Reif brothers, who owned a local mill.
- Taus is an unincorporated community located at the intersection of County Road J and Taus Road. The community was named for Domažlice, Czech Republic, which is known as Taus in German.

== Geography ==
According to the United States Census Bureau, the town has a total area of 36.2 square miles (93.7 km^{2}), of which 36.2 square miles (93.7 km^{2}) is land and 0.04 square miles (0.1 km^{2}) (0.06%) is water.

== Demographics ==
As of the census of 2000, there were 1,293 people, 469 households, and 355 families residing in the town. The population density was 35.8 people per square mile (13.8/km^{2}). There were 491 housing units at an average density of 13.6 per square mile (5.2/km^{2}). The racial makeup of the town was 99.61% White, 0.08% Native American, 0.08% Asian, and 0.23% from two or more races. Hispanic or Latino people of any race were 0.85% of the population.

There were 469 households, out of which 35.8% had children under the age of 18 living with them, 65.5% were married couples living together, 5.8% had a female householder with no husband present, and 24.3% were non-families. 19.8% of all households were made up of individuals, and 5.8% had someone living alone who was 65 years of age or older. The average household size was 2.76 and the average family size was 3.19.

In the town, the population was spread out, with 27.8% under the age of 18, 6.5% from 18 to 24, 30.7% from 25 to 44, 25.4% from 45 to 64, and 9.5% who were 65 years of age or older. The median age was 38 years. For every 100 females, there were 107.2 males. For every 100 females age 18 and over, there were 109.7 males.

The median income for a household in the town was $50,000, and the median income for a family was $53,056. Males had a median income of $36,474 versus $26,050 for females. The per capita income for the town was $19,602. About 4.3% of families and 7.6% of the population were below the poverty line, including 12.1% of those under age 18 and 4.9% of those age 65 or over.
