= Adolph Strouf =

American politician

Adolph Strouf (May 20, 1878 – October 4, 1961) was an American politician and businessman.

Born in the town of Gibson, Manitowoc County, Wisconsin, Strouf farmed in Two Rivers, Wisconsin and was an insurance salesman. He was involved with the telephone company, farm organizations, and the insurance business. Strouf served as the Gibson Town Board chairman and on the Manitowoc County Board of Supervisors. In 1949, Strouf served in the Wisconsin State Assembly and was a Democrat. He died of a heart attack at his home in Two Rivers, Wisconsin.
