= William Zander =

American politician from Wisconsin (1844–1919)

William Zander (1844–1919) was a member of the Wisconsin State Assembly.

== Biography ==
Zander was born on July 17, 1844, in Tessin, then in the German Confederation. He died on July 27, 1919.

Zander, Wisconsin, is named after his brother, Helmuth.

== Career ==
Zander was a member of the Assembly in 1879. Other positions he held include chairman of the board of supervisors of Manitowoc County, Wisconsin. He was a Democrat.
