= Anton D. Strouf =

American politician

Anton Strouf

Member of the Montana Senate
- In office 1920

Member of the Wisconsin State Assembly for Manitowoc County
- In office 1910

Personal details
- Born: November 19, 1884 Kossuth, Wisconsin, U.S.
- Died: August 27, 1940 (aged 55) Manitowoc, Wisconsin, U.S.
- Party: Democratic
- Education: Manitowoc Normal School; University of Chicago (JD)

Anton D. Strouf (November 19, 1884 – August 27, 1940) was an American politician and attorney who served as a member of the Wisconsin State Assembly and Montana Senate.

== Early life and education ==
Born in the town of Kossuth, Wisconsin, Strouf graduated from the Manitowoc County Rural Normal School. Strouf graduated from the University of Chicago Law School and was admitted to the State Bar of Wisconsin. Strouf also took postgraduate courses at the University of Wisconsin–Madison.

== Career ==
Strouf began his career as an educator. Strouf then served as a Democratic member of the Wisconsin State Assembly in 1920. After earning his J.D. degree, Strouf practiced law in Great Falls, Montana and served as a member of the Montana State Senate in 1920, but resigned shortly after and sold his law practice. In 1921, Strouf returned to Manitowoc, Wisconsin and continued to practice law.

== Death ==
In 1940, Strouf killed himself at a hotel in Manitowoc, Wisconsin.
