= Taus =

Taus may refer to:

- Domažlice (German: Taus), a town of the Czech Republic
- Taus, Wisconsin, United States, an unincorporated community
- Josef Taus (1933–2024), Austrian industrialist and politician
- Melek Taus, "The Peacock Angel", the Yazidis' name for the central figure of their faith
- Taus (instrument), a string instrument from India
- The plural of the Greek letter tau
- The plural of subatomic tau particle
