= Menchalville, Wisconsin =

- Unincorporated community
- Location within Wisconsin Location within the United States
- Coordinates: 44°13′33″N 87°52′56″W
- Country: United States
- State: Wisconsin
- County: Manitowoc
- Elevation: 856 ft (261 m)
- Time zone: UTC-6 (Central (CST))
  - Summer (DST): UTC-5 (CDT)
- Area code: 920
- GNIS feature ID: 1569333

Menchalville is an unincorporated community located in the town of Franklin, Manitowoc County, Wisconsin, United States. Menchalville is located at the junction of County Highways K and NN, 4 miles (6.4 km) west of Kellnersville.
