= Zander, Wisconsin =

- Unincorporated community
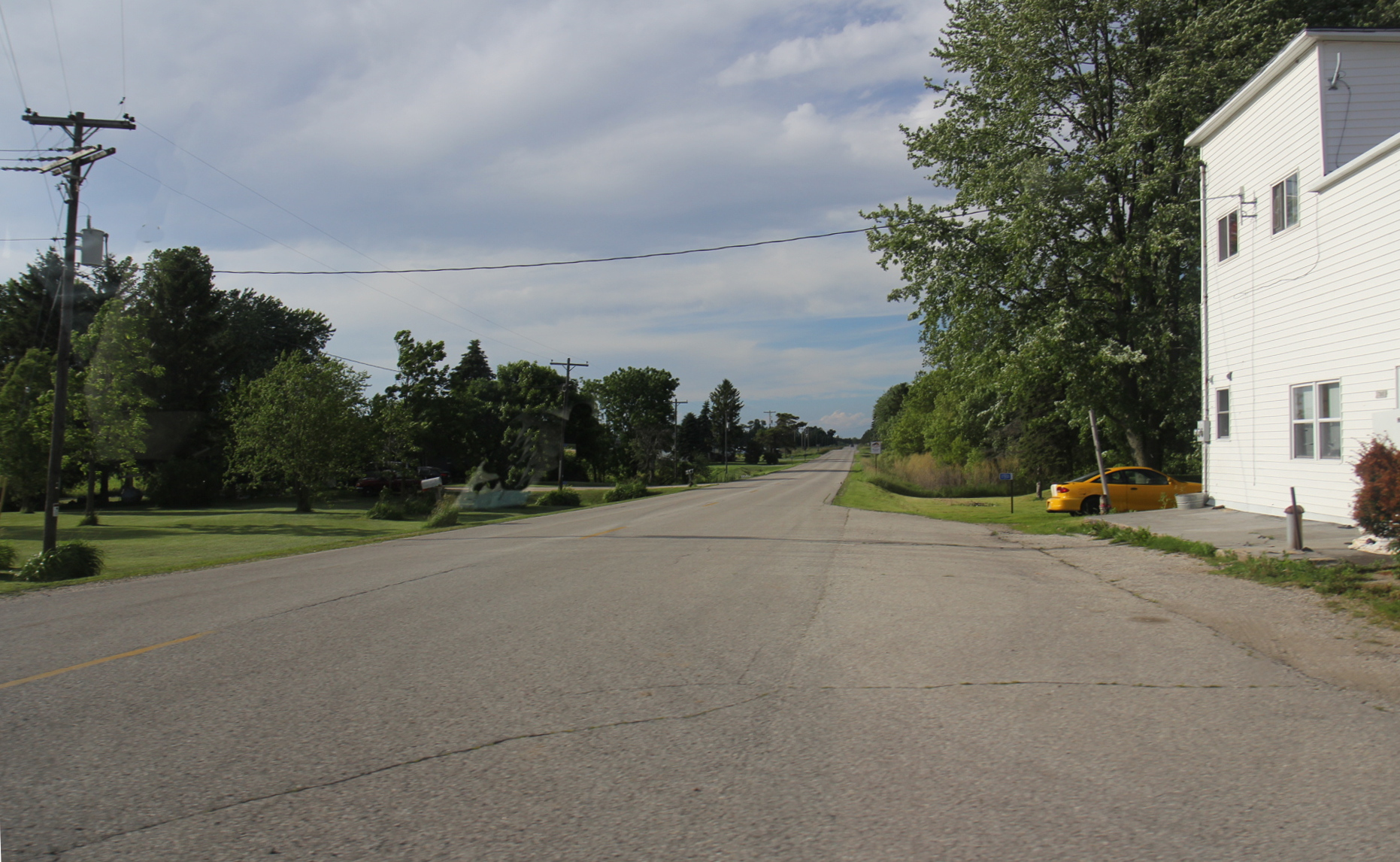
- Looking north in Zander

- Location within Wisconsin Location within the United States
- Coordinates: 44°18′47″N 87°42′19″W
- Country: United States
- State: Wisconsin
- County: Manitowoc
- Elevation: 735 ft (224 m)
- Time zone: UTC-6 (Central (CST))
  - Summer (DST): UTC-5 (CDT)
- Area code: 920
- GNIS feature ID: 1577898

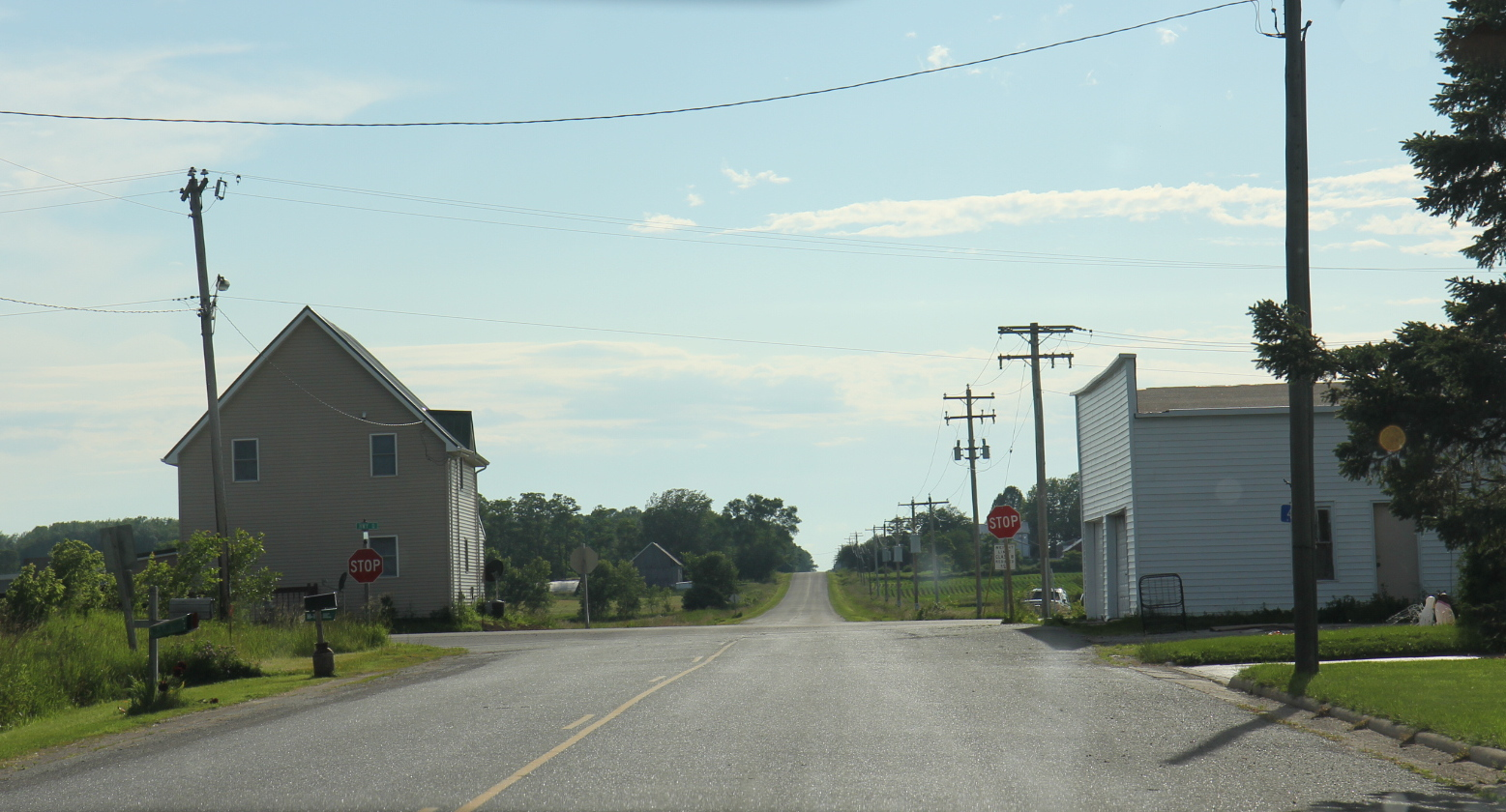
Looking west in Zander

Zander is an unincorporated community located in the town of Gibson, Manitowoc County, Wisconsin, United States.

== History ==
The community was named after an early settler, Helmuth Zander. Helmuth was the brother of William Zander.
