= Kossuth, Wisconsin =

- Town
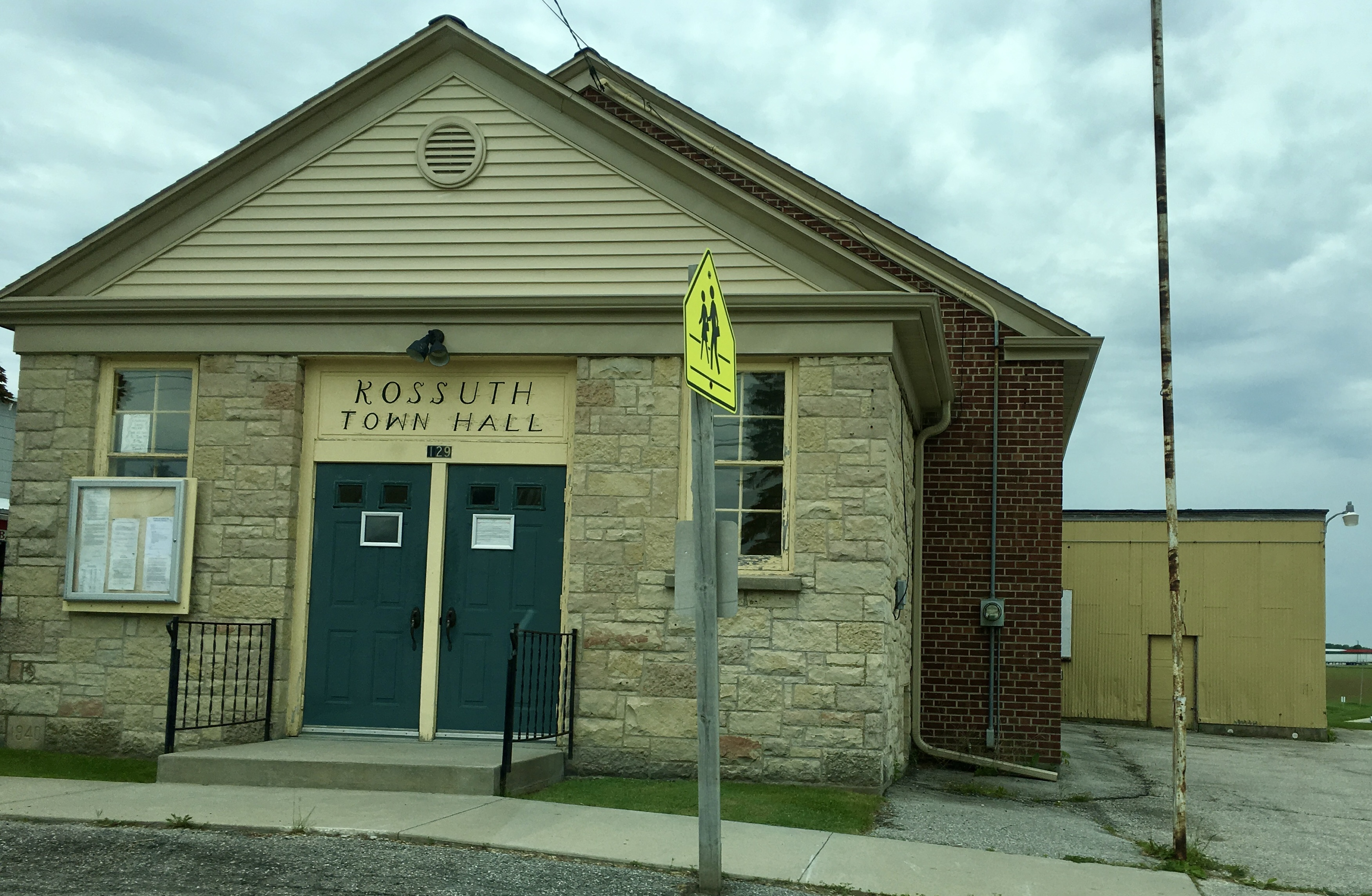
- Town hall

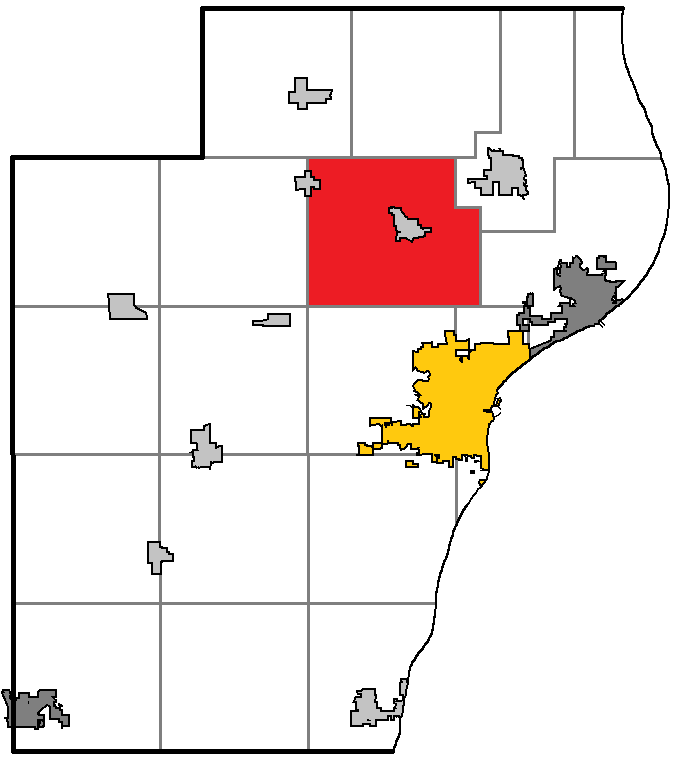
- Location of Kossuth, within Manitowoc County
- Coordinates: 44°11′51″N 87°43′48″W
- Country: United States
- State: Wisconsin
- County: Manitowoc

Area
  - Total: 38.7 sq mi (100.3 km^{2})
  - Land: 38.7 sq mi (100.3 km^{2})
  - Water: 0 sq mi (0.0 km^{2})
- Elevation: 748 ft (228 m)

Population (2020)
  - Total: 1,969
  - Density: 50.84/sq mi (19.63/km^{2})
- Time zone: UTC-6 (Central (CST))
  - Summer (DST): UTC-5 (CDT)
- Area code: 920
- FIPS code: 55-40425
- GNIS feature ID: 1583495
- Website: townofkossuth.wi.gov

Kossuth is a town in Manitowoc County, Wisconsin, United States. The population was 1,969 at the 2020 census. The village of Francis Creek and the unincorporated community of Rockwood are located in the town. The unincorporated communities of Kingsbridge and Reifs Mills are also located partially in the town.

== Geography ==
According to the United States Census Bureau, the town has a total area of 38.7 square miles (100.3 km^{2}), of which 38.7 square miles (100.3 km^{2}) is land and 0.03% is water.

== Demographics ==
As of the census of 2000, there were 2,033 people, 752 households, and 578 families living in the town. The population density was 52.5 people per square mile (20.3/km^{2}). There were 795 housing units at an average density of 20.5 per square mile (7.9/km^{2}). The racial makeup of the town was 98.77% White, 0.30% Native American, 0.15% Asian, and 0.79% from two or more races. Hispanic or Latino people of any race were 0.15% of the population.

There were 752 households, out of which 34.0% had children under the age of 18 living with them, 68.6% were married couples living together, 3.6% had a female householder with no husband present, and 23.1% were non-families. 19.1% of all households were made up of individuals, and 7.2% had someone living alone who was 65 years of age or older. The average household size was 2.70 and the average family size was 3.12.

In the town, the population was spread out, with 26.9% under the age of 18, 6.3% from 18 to 24, 29.6% from 25 to 44, 26.8% from 45 to 64, and 10.4% who were 65 years of age or older. The median age was 38 years. For every 100 females, there were 108.9 males. For every 100 females age 18 and over, there were 112.7 males.

The median income for a household in the town was $55,114, and the median income for a family was $60,610. Males had a median income of $38,448 versus $25,197 for females. The per capita income for the town was $21,126. About 2.1% of families and 3.1% of the population were below the poverty line, including 3.1% of those under age 18 and 5.4% of those age 65 or over.

== Notable people ==
- James Sibree Anderson, politician, lived in what is now the town
- Thomas Mohr, politician, lived in the town
- Anton D. Strouf, politician, born in the town
- King Weeman, politician, born in the town
