= Larrabee (community), Wisconsin =

Larrabee, Wisconsin
- Unincorporated community
- Location within Wisconsin Location within the United States
- Coordinates: 44°16′05″N 87°42′54″W
- Country: United States
- State: Wisconsin
- County: Manitowoc
- Elevation: 735 ft (224 m)
- Time zone: UTC-6 (Central (CST))
  - Summer (DST): UTC-5 (CDT)
- ZIP codes: 54227, 54241
- Area code: 920
- GNIS feature ID: 1567852

Larrabee is an unincorporated community located within the town of Gibson, in northern Manitowoc County, Wisconsin, United States. Larrabee is the highest-populated community within Gibson, and as such historically served as a commercial and political hub of the town; the town hall of Gibson lies less than one-half mile (0.8 km) north of the community. The community is nearly equidistant from the two nearest municipalities, with Maribel approximately 3.2 miles (5.1 km) to the west-northwest and Mishicot 3.3 miles (5.3 km) to the southeast.

The center of the community is located at the crossroads of the only two highways that service it, Wisconsin Highway 147 and County Highway Q. Education within the community is provided by the Mishicot School District, the campus of which is approximately five miles (8 km) southeast.
