= Francis Creek, Wisconsin =

- Village
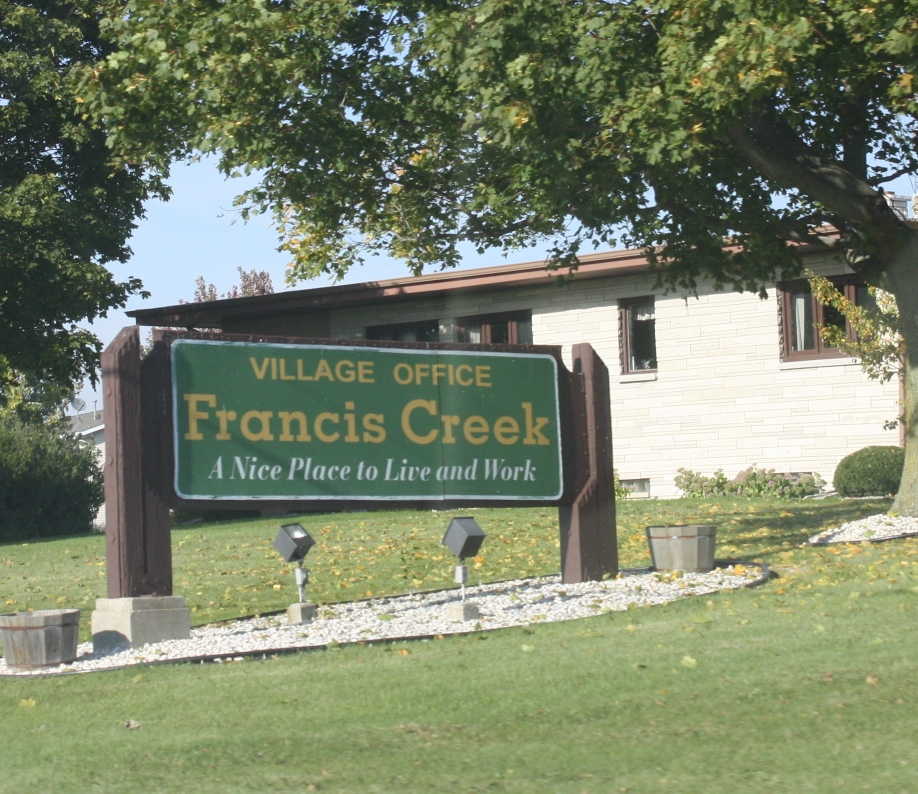
- Nickname: French Crick
- Location of Francis Creek in Manitowoc County, Wisconsin.
- Coordinates: 44°12′10″N 87°43′19″W
- Country: United States
- State: Wisconsin
- County: Manitowoc

Government
  - Village President 2018-2020: Matt Payette

Area
  - Total: 1.14 sq mi (2.94 km^{2})
  - Land: 1.14 sq mi (2.94 km^{2})
  - Water: 0 sq mi (0.00 km^{2})
- Elevation: 732 ft (223 m)

Population (2020)
  - Total: 659
  - Density: 563.2/sq mi (217.44/km^{2})
- Time zone: UTC-6 (Central (CST))
  - Summer (DST): UTC-5 (CDT)
- Area code: 920
- FIPS code: 55-27125
- GNIS feature ID: 1565246
- Website: www.franciscreek.org

Francis Creek is a village in Manitowoc County, Wisconsin, United States. The population was 659 at the 2020 census. The village is located within the town of Kossuth.

== History ==
A post office called Francis Creek was first established in 1850. The village took its name from nearby Francis Creek.

== Geography ==
Francis Creek is located at 44°12′10″N 87°43′19″W (44.202728, -87.722047).

According to the United States Census Bureau, the village has a total area of 1.18 square miles (3.06 km^{2}), all land.

The village is situated east of Interstate 43.

== Demographics ==
Historical population
Census	Pop.	Note	%±
1970	492		—
1980	589		19.7%
1990	562		−4.6%
2000	681		21.2%
2010	669		−1.8%
2020	659		−1.5%
U.S. Decennial Census

=== 2010 census ===
As of the census of 2010, there were 669 people, 277 households, and 189 families living in the village. The population density was 566.9 inhabitants per square mile (218.9/km^{2}). There were 296 housing units at an average density of 250.8 per square mile (96.8/km^{2}). The racial makeup of the village was 97.6% White, 0.1% African American, 0.6% Asian, 0.3% from other races, and 1.3% from two or more races. Hispanic or Latino people of any race were 0.4% of the population.

There were 277 households, of which 27.4% had children under the age of 18 living with them, 57.0% were married couples living together, 7.2% had a female householder with no husband present, 4.0% had a male householder with no wife present, and 31.8% were non-families. 27.1% of all households were made up of individuals, and 10.1% had someone living alone who was 65 years of age or older. The average household size was 2.42 and the average family size was 2.91.

The median age in the village was 39.3 years. 22.4% of residents were under the age of 18; 9.8% were between the ages of 18 and 24; 24.2% were from 25 to 44; 29.4% were from 45 to 64; and 14.3% were 65 years of age or older. The gender makeup of the village was 49.5% male and 50.5% female.

=== 2000 census ===
As of the census of 2000, there were 681 people, 266 households, and 186 families living in the village. The population density was 618.6 people per square mile (239.0/km^{2}). There were 280 housing units at an average density of 254.3 per square mile (98.3/km^{2}). The racial makeup of the village was 99.85% White, 0.15% from other races. Hispanic or Latino people of any race were 0.88% of the population.

There were 266 households, out of which 36.8% had children under the age of 18 living with them, 58.6% were married couples living together, 7.9% had a female householder with no husband present, and 29.7% were non-families. 25.9% of all households were made up of individuals, and 13.2% had someone living alone who was 65 years of age or older. The average household size was 2.56 and the average family size was 3.09.

In the village, the population was spread out, with 27.6% under the age of 18, 9.3% from 18 to 24, 29.4% from 25 to 44, 20.3% from 45 to 64, and 13.5% who were 65 years of age or older. The median age was 35 years. For every 100 females, there were 99.7 males. For every 100 females age 18 and over, there were 98.0 males.

The median income for a household in the village was $43,542, and the median income for a family was $53,542. Males had a median income of $33,750 versus $21,618 for females. The per capita income for the village was $18,441. About 6.2% of families and 5.1% of the population were below the poverty line, including 5.0% of those under age 18 and 14.4% of those age 65 or over.

== Events ==
Every year, Francis Creek hosts a village-wide rummage sale on the first weekend of June. The Francis Creek Lions Club provides a food tent at Wagner's Restaurant, on the corner of South Packer Drive and Forest Home Drive.

Every year, Francis Creek holds French Creek Days on the second weekend in July. People gather from many of the neighboring cities to see the tractor and truck pulls. It is one of the biggest festivals in the area.

== Images ==
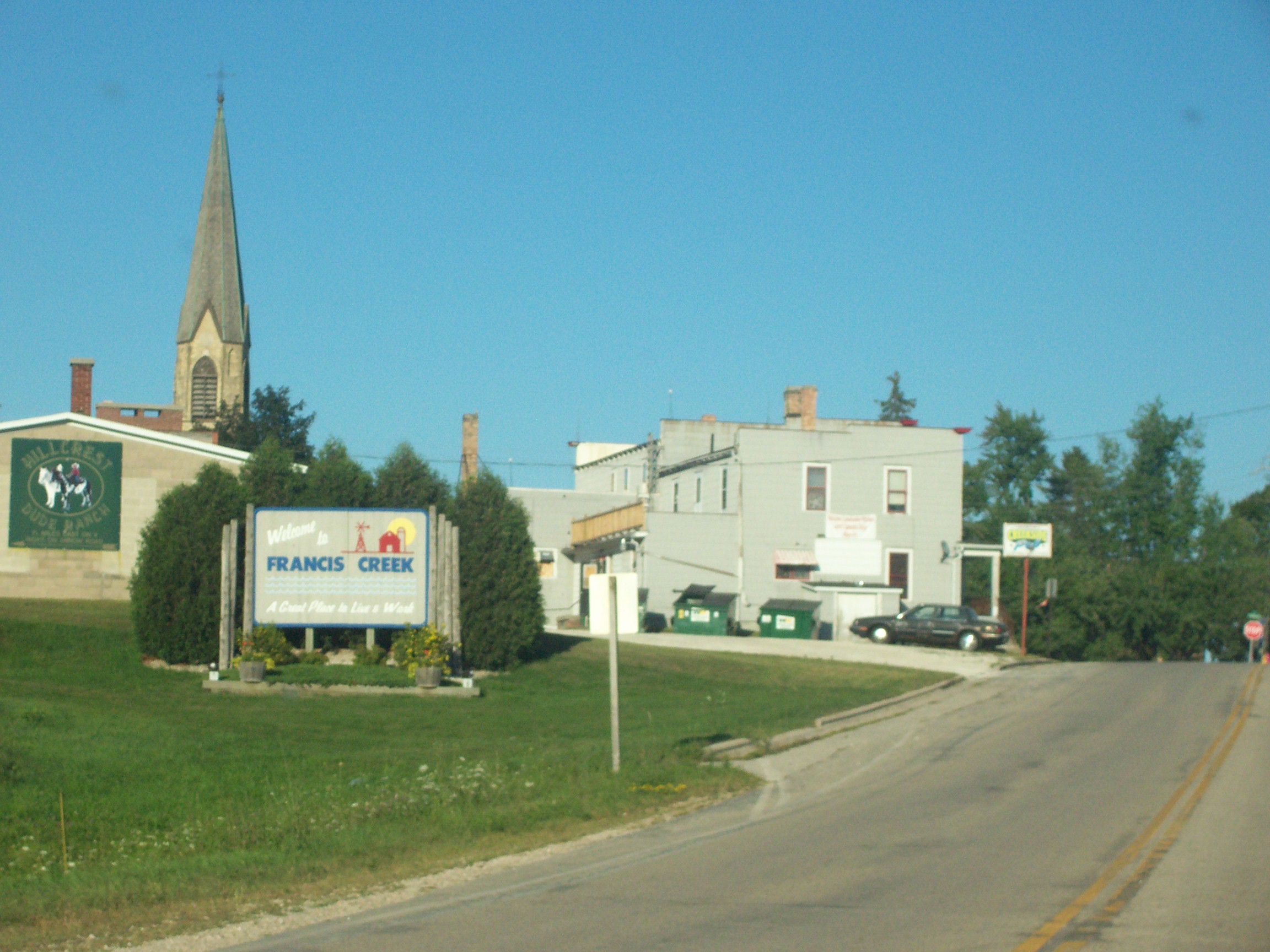
Welcome sign

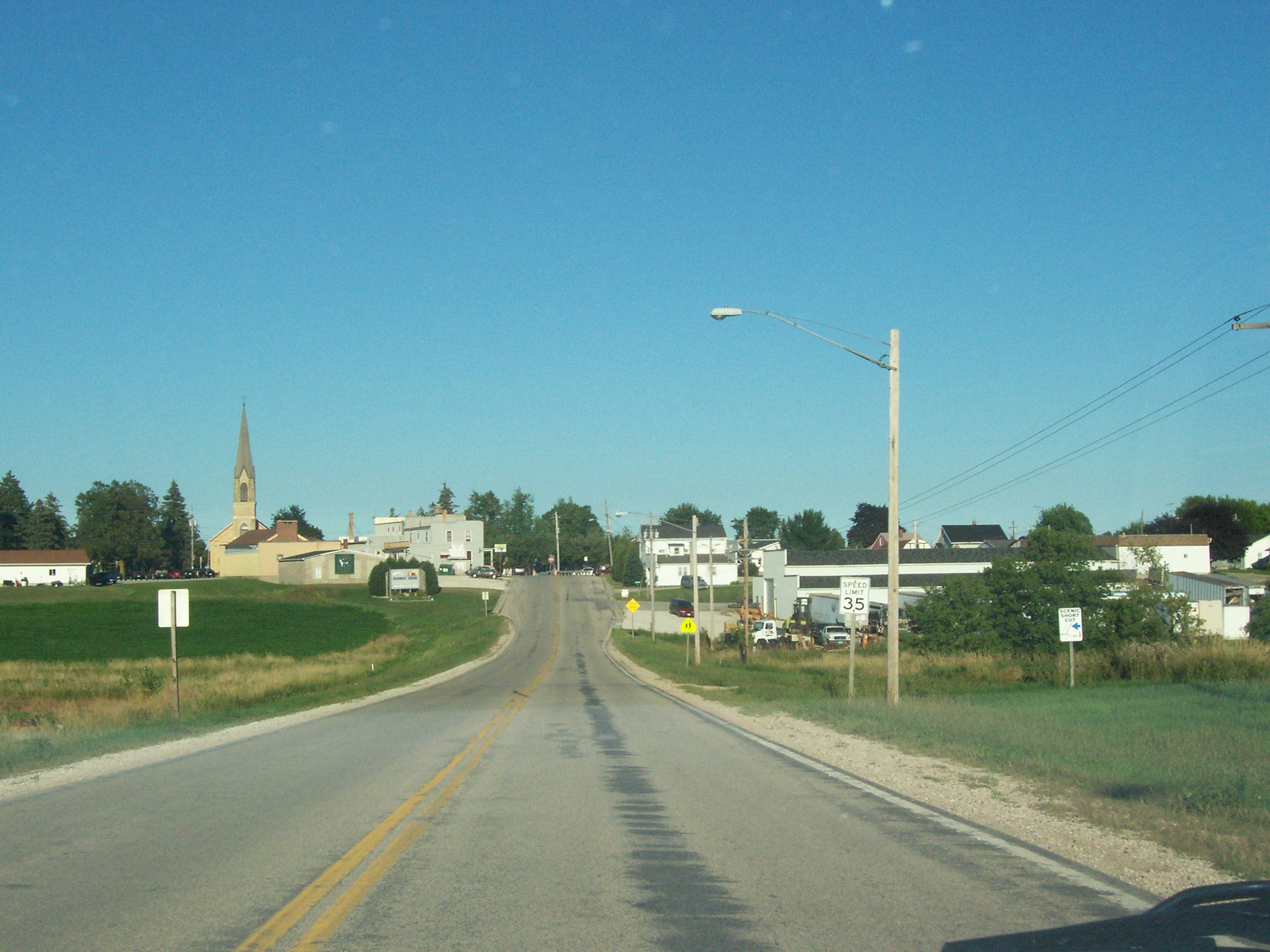
Looking east at Francis Creek

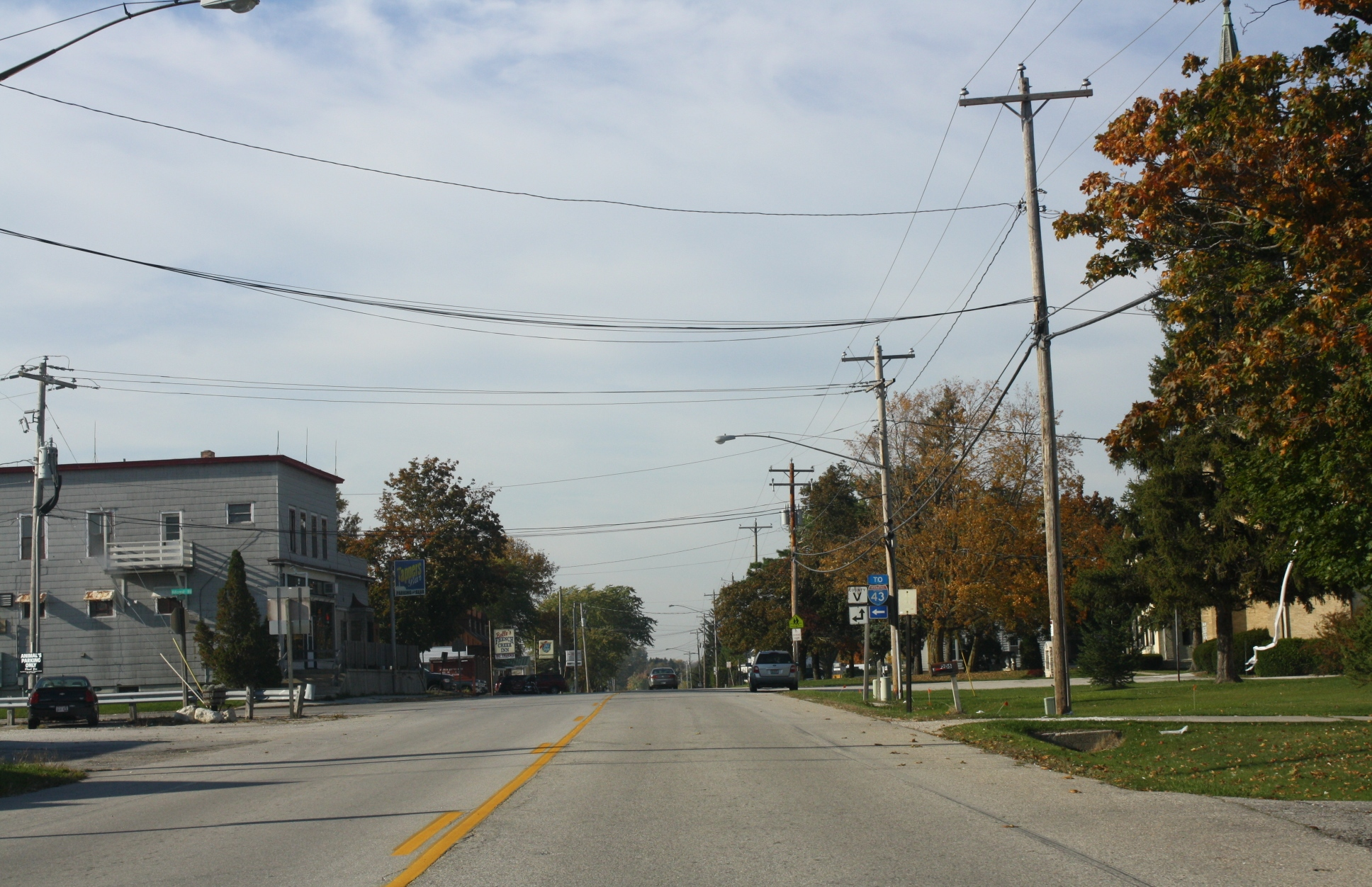
Looking north in downtown Francis Creek
