= Reifs Mills, Wisconsin =

- Unincorporated community
- Location within Wisconsin Location within the United States
- Coordinates: 44°10′56″N 87°47′57″W
- Country: United States
- State: Wisconsin
- County: Manitowoc
- Elevation: 751 ft (229 m)
- Time zone: UTC-6 (Central (CST))
  - Summer (DST): UTC-5 (CDT)
- Area code: 920
- GNIS feature ID: 1572190

Reifs Mills is an unincorporated community located in the towns of Franklin and Kossuth, Manitowoc County, Wisconsin, United States.

== Etymology ==
The community was named after the Reif brothers, proprietors of a local mill.
