= Steinthal, Wisconsin =

- Unincorporated community
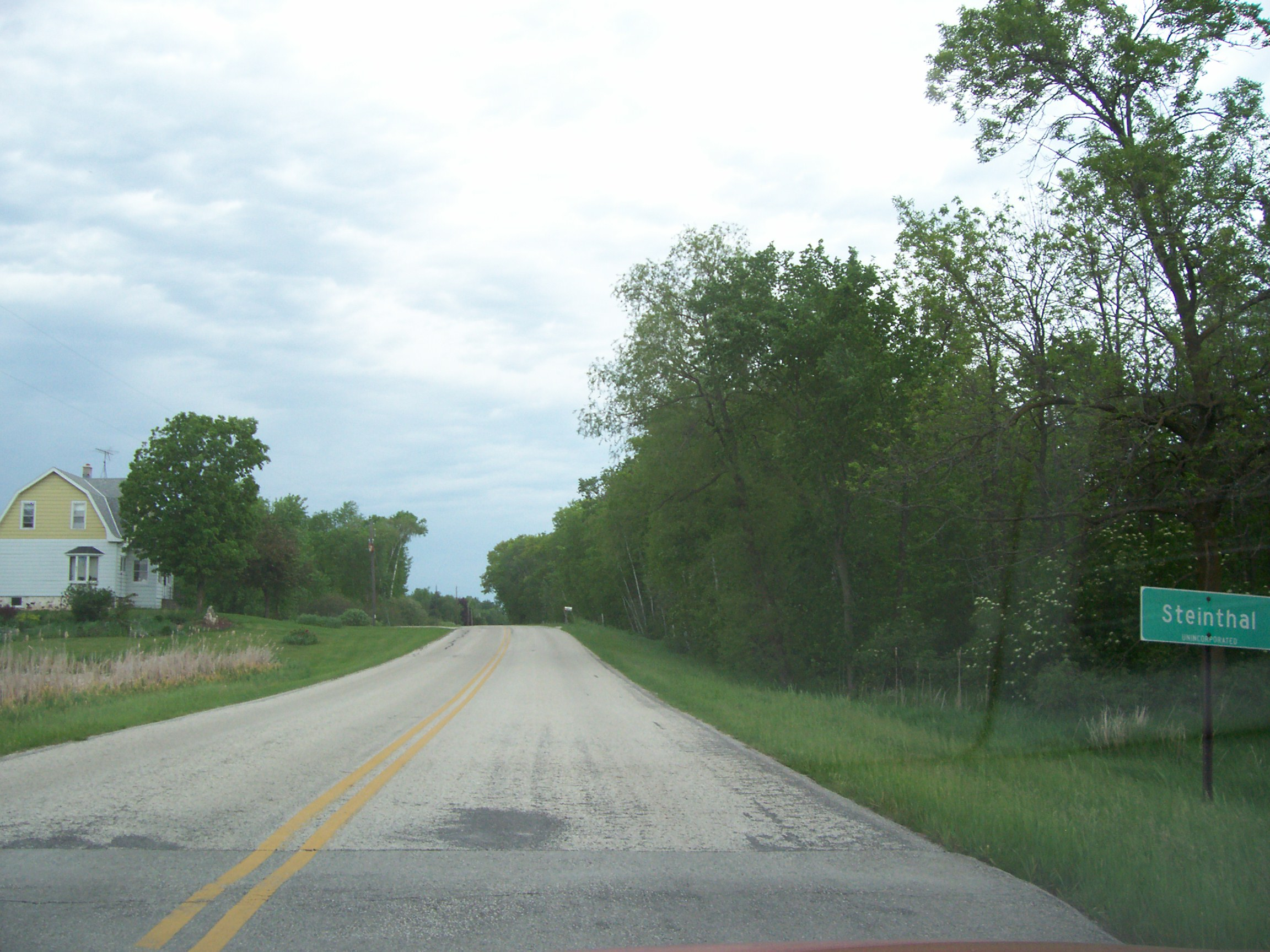
- Welcome sign

- Location within Wisconsin Location within the United States
- Coordinates: 43°58′57″N 88°00′08″W
- Country: United States
- State: Wisconsin
- County: Manitowoc
- Elevation: 866 ft (264 m)
- Time zone: UTC-6 (Central (CST))
  - Summer (DST): UTC-5 (CDT)
- Area code: 920
- GNIS feature ID: 1577838

Steinthal is an unincorporated community in the Town of Eaton, Manitowoc County, Wisconsin, United States. The community had a post office and general store.

== Images ==
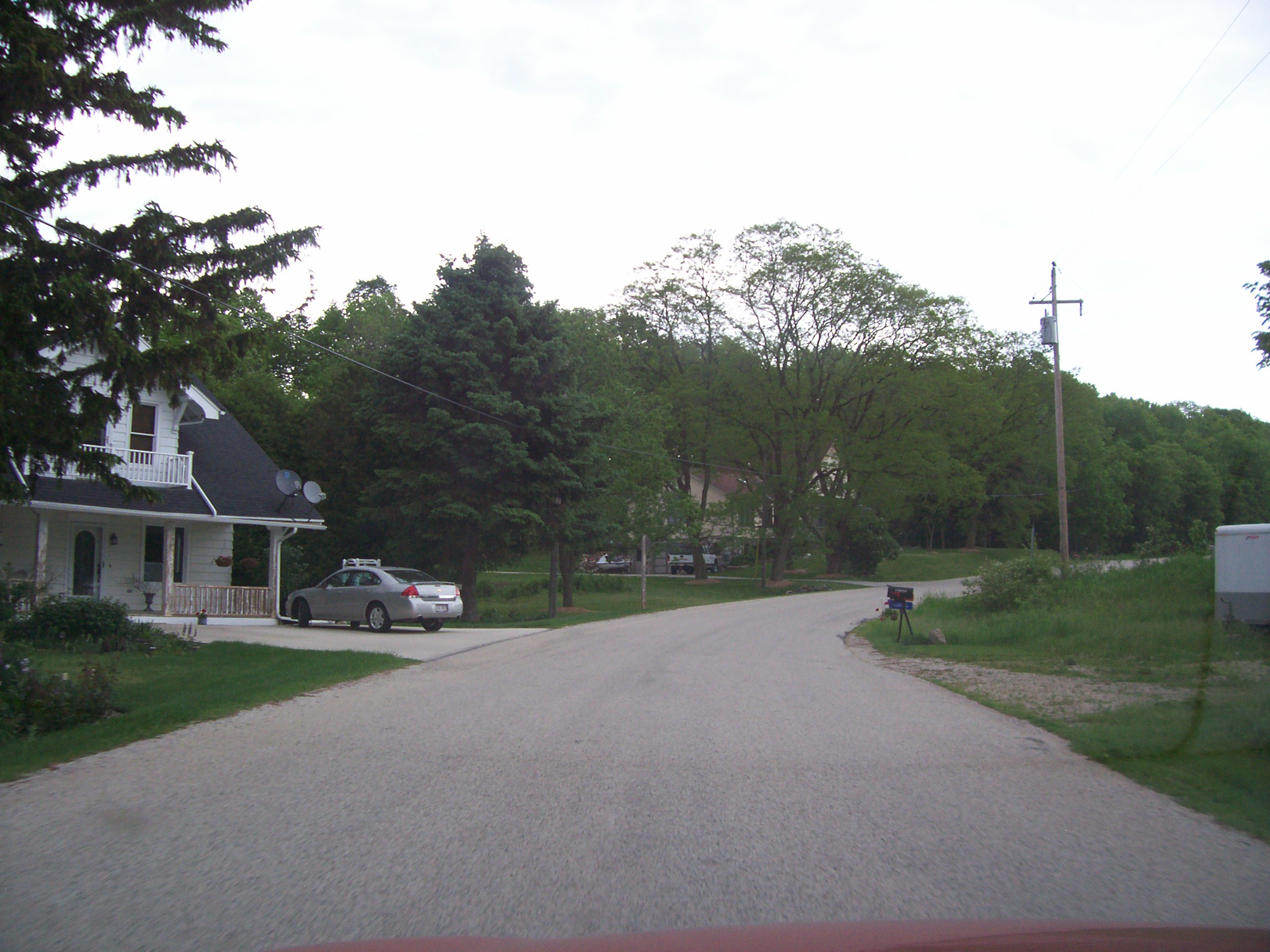
Looking east at downtown Steinthal

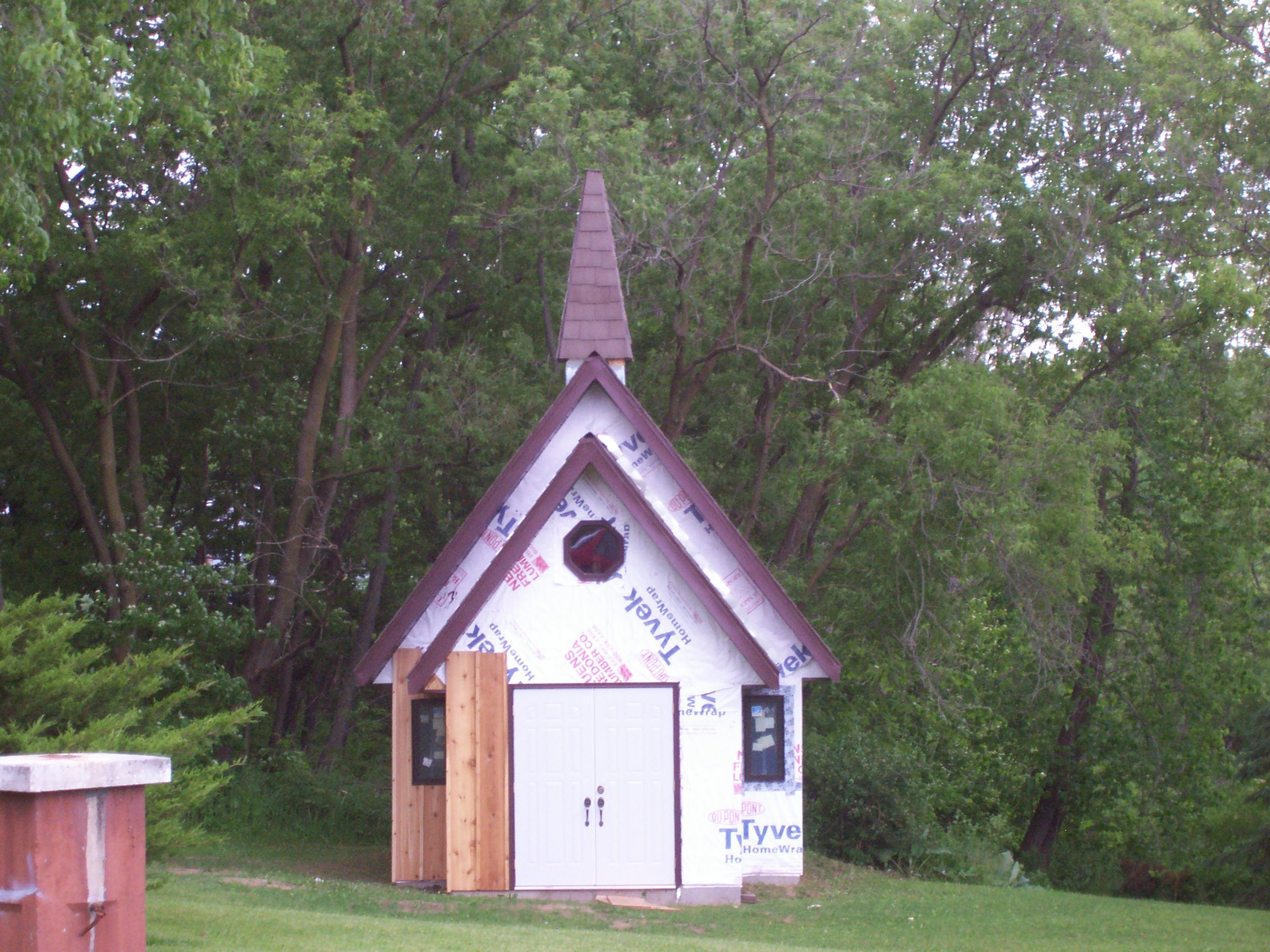
Chapel under construction in 2008
