= Eaton, Manitowoc County, Wisconsin =

Eaton, Wisconsin
- Town
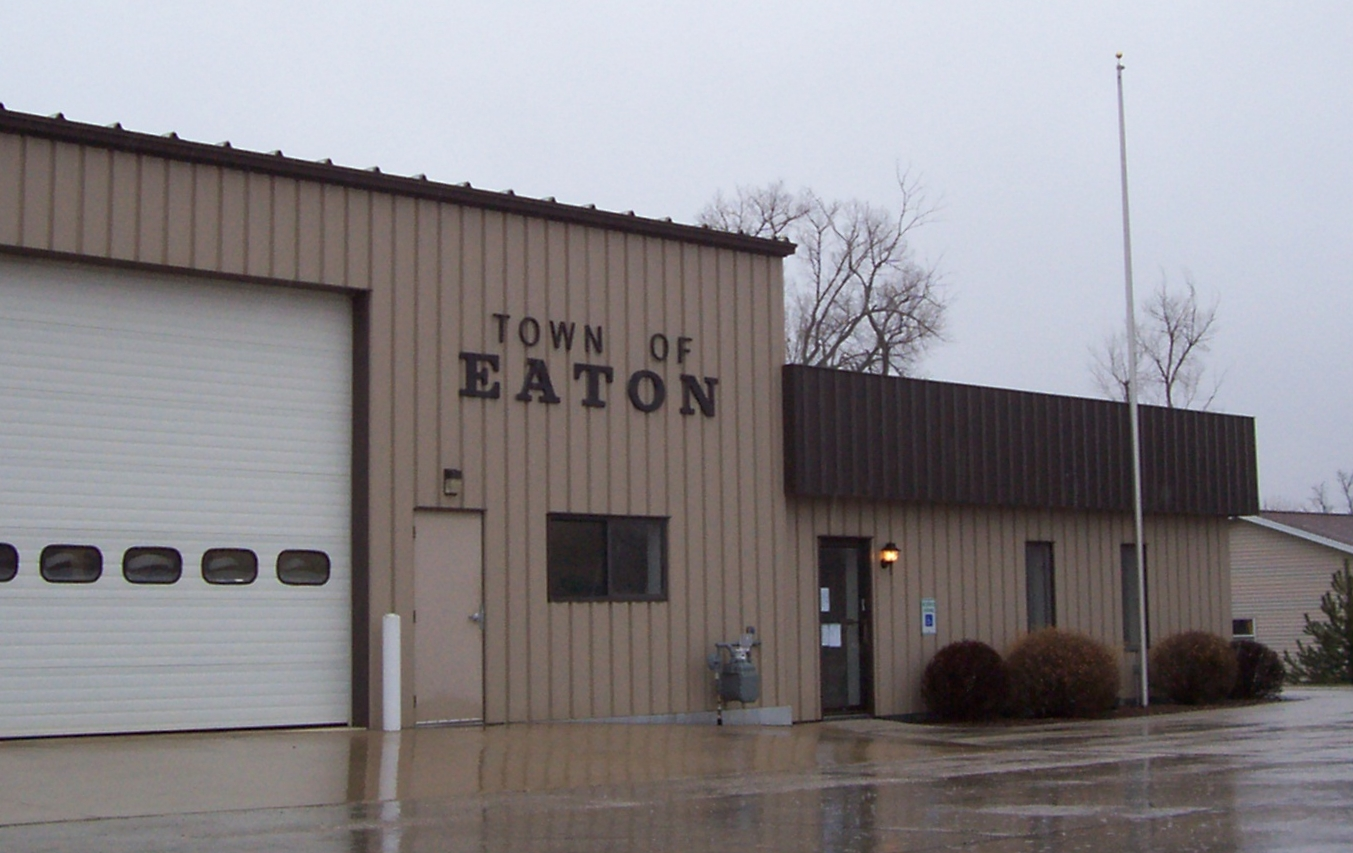
- Town hall

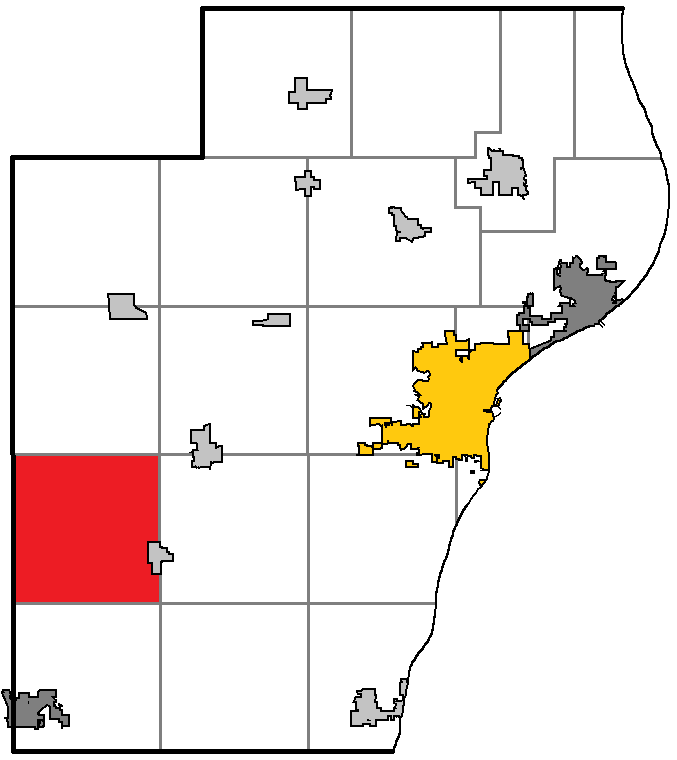
- Location of Eaton, within Manitowoc County
- Coordinates: 44°1′8″N 87°57′56″W
- Country: United States
- State: Wisconsin
- County: Manitowoc

Area
  - Total: 35.4 sq mi (91.7 km^{2})
  - Land: 35.2 sq mi (91.1 km^{2})
  - Water: 0.23 sq mi (0.6 km^{2})
- Elevation: 866 ft (264 m)

Population (2020)
  - Total: 814
  - Density: 23.1/sq mi (8.94/km^{2})
- Time zone: UTC-6 (Central (CST))
  - Summer (DST): UTC-5 (CDT)
- Area code: 920
- FIPS code: 55-22275
- GNIS feature ID: 1583123
- Website: https://tn.eaton-manitowoc.wi.gov/

Eaton is a town in Manitowoc County, Wisconsin, United States. The population was 814 at the 2020 census. The unincorporated community of Steinthal is located in the town.

== Geography ==
According to the United States Census Bureau, the town has a total area of 35.4 square miles (91.7 km^{2}), of which 35.2 square miles (91.1 km^{2}) is land and 0.2 square miles (0.6 km^{2}) (0.62%) is water.

== Demographics ==
As of the census of 2000, there were 761 people, 270 households, and 216 families residing in the town. The population density was 21.6 people per square mile (8.4/km^{2}). There were 288 housing units at an average density of 8.2 per square mile (3.2/km^{2}). The racial makeup of the town was 97.90% White, 0.13% African American, 0.13% Asian, 0.39% from other races, and 1.45% from two or more races. Hispanic or Latino people of any race were 1.71% of the population.

There were 270 households, out of which 38.9% had children under the age of 18 living with them, 69.6% were married couples living together, 3.7% had a female householder with no husband present, and 20.0% were non-families. 15.6% of all households were made up of individuals, and 7.4% had someone living alone who was 65 years of age or older. The average household size was 2.82 and the average family size was 3.20.

In the town, the population was spread out, with 27.2% under the age of 18, 8.3% from 18 to 24, 30.2% from 25 to 44, 24.3% from 45 to 64, and 10.0% who were 65 years of age or older. The median age was 37 years. For every 100 females, there were 115.0 males. For every 100 females age 18 and over, there were 115.6 males.

The median income for a household in the town was $52,054, and the median income for a family was $55,179. Males had a median income of $32,500 versus $24,286 for females. The per capita income for the town was $19,400. About 1.7% of families and 3.9% of the population were below the poverty line, including 7.8% of those under age 18 and none of those age 65 or over.

== Notable people ==
- Henry Kleist, politician
- Victor A. Miller, Attorney General of Wisconsin; born in Eaton
