= Gibson, Wisconsin =

- Town
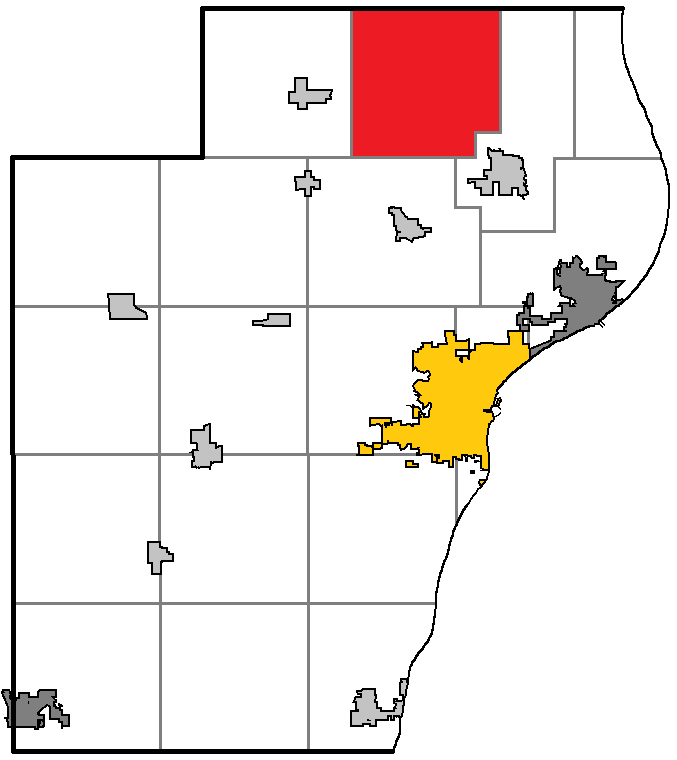
- Location of Gibson, within Manitowoc County Map
- Coordinates: 44°16′49″N 87°43′21″W
- Country: United States
- State: Wisconsin
- County: Manitowoc

Area
  - Total: 35.3 sq mi (91.5 km^{2})
  - Land: 35.3 sq mi (91.3 km^{2})
  - Water: 0.077 sq mi (0.2 km^{2})
- Elevation: 692 ft (211 m)

Population (2020)
  - Total: 1,315
  - Density: 37.3/sq mi (14.4/km^{2})
- Time zone: UTC-6 (Central (CST))
  - Summer (DST): UTC-5 (CDT)
- Area code: 920
- FIPS code: 55-28975
- GNIS feature ID: 1583272
- Website: townofgibsonwi.gov

Gibson is a town in Manitowoc County, Wisconsin, United States. The population was 1,315 at the 2020 census.

== Communities ==
- Fisherville is an unincorporated community located at the intersection of Cherney Road and Fisherville Road.
- Larrabee is an unincorporated community located at the intersection of WIS 147 and County Road Q.
- Melnik is an unincorporated community located on Melnik Road, north of County Road Y.
- Zander is an unincorporated community located at the intersection of County Road Q and Zander Road.

== Geography ==
According to the United States Census Bureau, the town has a total area of 35.3 square miles (91.5 km^{2}), of which 35.3 square miles (91.3 km^{2}) is land and 0.1 square miles (0.2 km^{2}) (0.25%) is water.

== Demographics ==
As of the census of 2000, there were 1,352 people, 471 households, and 374 families residing in the town. The population density was 38.3 people per square mile (14.8/km^{2}). There were 495 housing units at an average density of 14.0 per square mile (5.4/km^{2}). The racial makeup of the town was 98.96% White, 0.07% African American, 0.07% Native American, 0.07% Asian, 0.07% Pacific Islander, and 0.74% from two or more races. Hispanic or Latino people of any race were 0.52% of the population.

There were 471 households, out of which 39.3% had children under the age of 18 living with them, 70.5% were married couples living together, 3.6% had a female householder with no husband present, and 20.4% were non-families. 15.9% of all households were made up of individuals, and 5.5% had someone living alone who was 65 years of age or older. The average household size was 2.87 and the average family size was 3.23.

In the town, the population was spread out, with 28.6% under the age of 18, 7.2% from 18 to 24, 29.7% from 25 to 44, 26.1% from 45 to 64, and 8.5% who were 65 years of age or older. The median age was 37 years. For every 100 females, there were 116.7 males. For every 100 females age 18 and over, there were 117.1 males.

The median income for a household in the town was $48,438, and the median income for a family was $52,500. Males had a median income of $34,750 versus $26,339 for females. The per capita income for the town was $18,885. About 1.6% of families and 2.8% of the population were below the poverty line, including 3.3% of those under age 18 and 3.3% of those age 65 or over.

== Notable people ==
- Steven Avery, convicted of homicide after being exonerated of an earlier crime by DNA evidence
- James Baumgart, Wisconsin State Senator
- Shae Sortwell, current 2nd district Assembly Representative
- Adolph Strouf, Wisconsin State Assembly Representative
