= Melnik, Wisconsin =

- Unincorporated community
- Location within Wisconsin Location within the United States
- Coordinates: 44°14′51″N 87°44′45″W
- Country: United States
- State: Wisconsin
- County: Manitowoc
- Elevation: 804 ft (245 m)
- Time zone: UTC-6 (Central (CST))
  - Summer (DST): UTC-5 (CDT)
- Area code: 920
- GNIS feature ID: 1577725

Melnik is an unincorporated community located in the town of Gibson, Manitowoc County, Wisconsin, United States. It consists of a handful of houses and the Melnik Presbyterian Church and attached cemetery.

Melnik is 5.2 miles (8.4 km) west of Mishicot.

The community was named for Mělník, Czech Republic by some of the many Czech immigrants who came to Wisconsin, including Manitowoc County.
