= Coopertown =

Coopertown may refer to:

== Places ==
United States

- Coopertown, Florida in Miami-Dade County, Florida
- Coopertown, Tennessee in Robertson County, Tennessee
- Coopertown, West Virginia in Boone County, West Virginia

== See also ==
- Cooperstown (disambiguation)
