= Cooperstown (community), Wisconsin =

Cooperstown, Wisconsin
- Unincorporated community
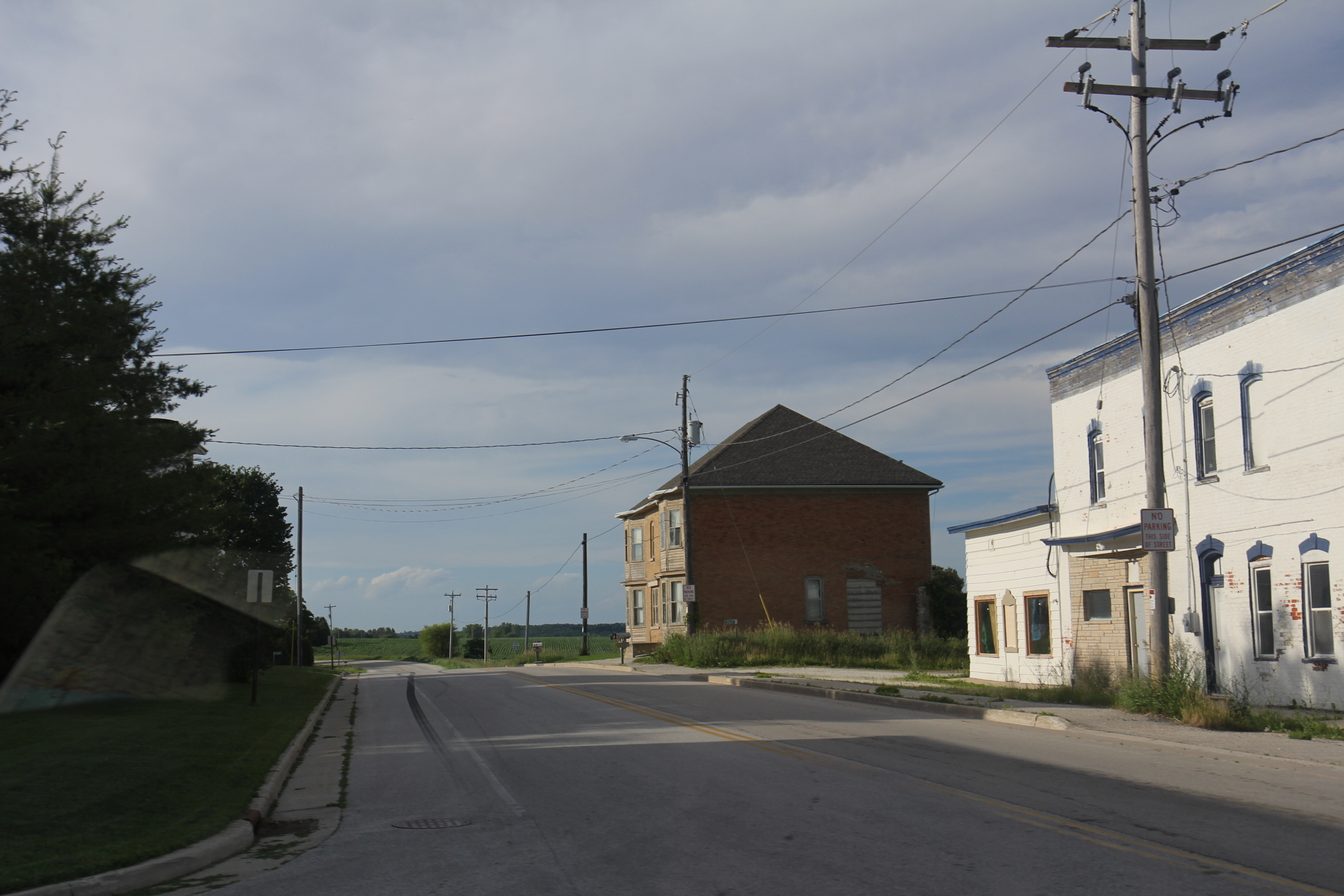
- Looking north in Cooperstown

- Location within Wisconsin Location within the United States
- Coordinates: 44°18′46″N 87°46′28″W
- Country: United States
- State: Wisconsin
- County: Manitowoc
- Elevation: 784 ft (239 m)
- Time zone: UTC-6 (Central (CST))
  - Summer (DST): UTC-5 (CDT)
- Area code: 920
- GNIS feature ID: 1577557

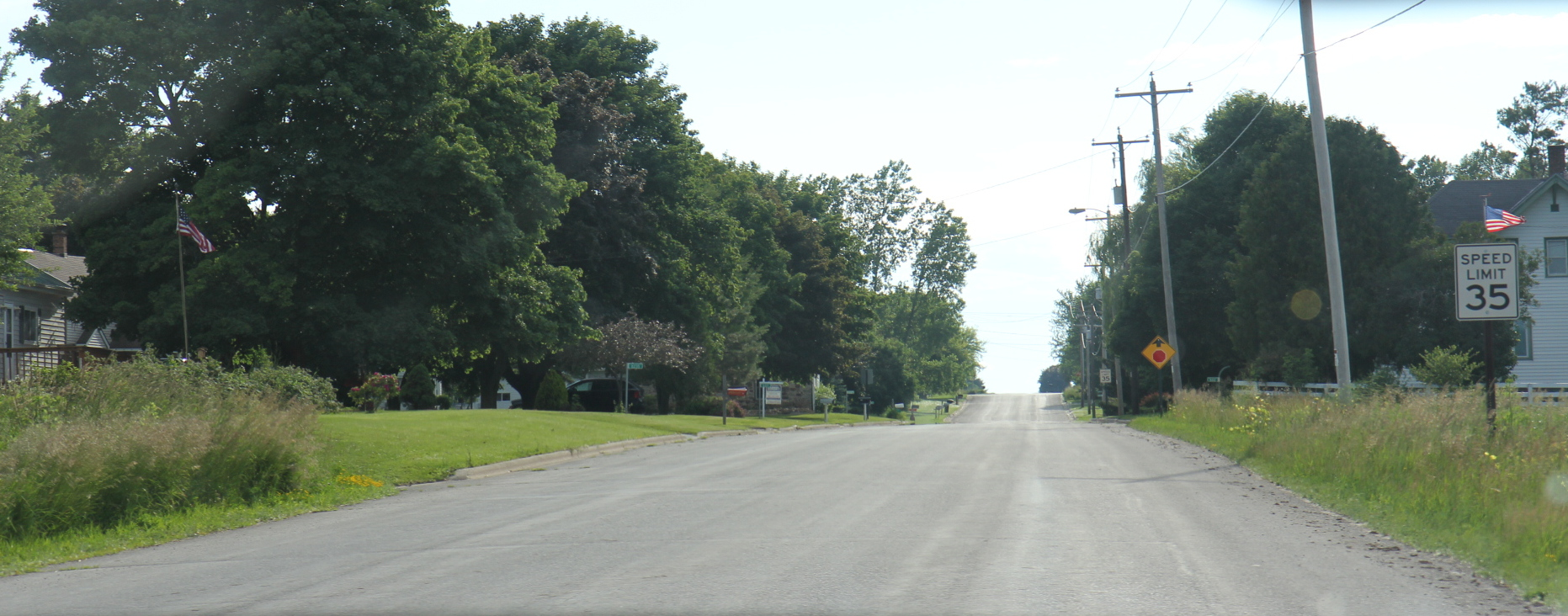
Looking north in Cooperstown

Cooperstown is an unincorporated community located in the town of Cooperstown, Manitowoc County, Wisconsin, United States. Cooperstown is located on County Highway R, 3 miles (4.8 km) north-northeast of Maribel.
