= Cooperstown cocktail =

The Cooperstown cocktail refers to a panel of four drug probes used in human pharmacokinetic studies to determine the activity of drug metabolising enzymes. The terminology 'cocktail' refers to the fact that the drug probes are given together.

The Cooperstown cocktail consists of four drugs that are considered specific substrates for four cytochrome P450 (CYP) isoforms. One of the drugs (caffeine) provides, through its metabolites, substrates for two additional enzymes.

== Uses ==
The drugs and the enzymes they probe are as follows - caffeine (probes CYP1A2, N-acetyltransferase 2, xanthine oxidase), midazolam (probes CYP3A), omeprazole (probes CYP2C19) and dextromethorphan (probes CYP2D6). After giving the cocktail, the concentrations of the drugs and their metabolites in plasma (for midazolam and omeprazole) and urine (for caffeine and dextromethorphan) are determined at various times. By analysing these concentrations, it is possible to determine the activity (i.e. the phenotype) of the relevant enzyme. Caffeine can be used as a probe for three different enzymes by measuring several of its urinary metabolites and comparing their relative concentrations.

The 'Cooperstown 5 + 1 cocktail', in addition to the four drug probes mentioned above, incorporates warfarin as well. Warfarin (actually the S-warfarin enantiomer) is a specific probe for CYP2C9. The '+ 1' refers to the vitamin K that is given together with the warfarin to prevent any anticoagulant effect.

The Cooperstown cocktail and the Cooperstown 5 + 1 cocktail are powerful tools for investigating the activity of important drug metabolising enzymes. They are used in human drug interaction studies in which the ability of a study drug to inhibit or induce cytochrome p450 enzymes is studied.
