= Cooperstown, Wisconsin =

- Town
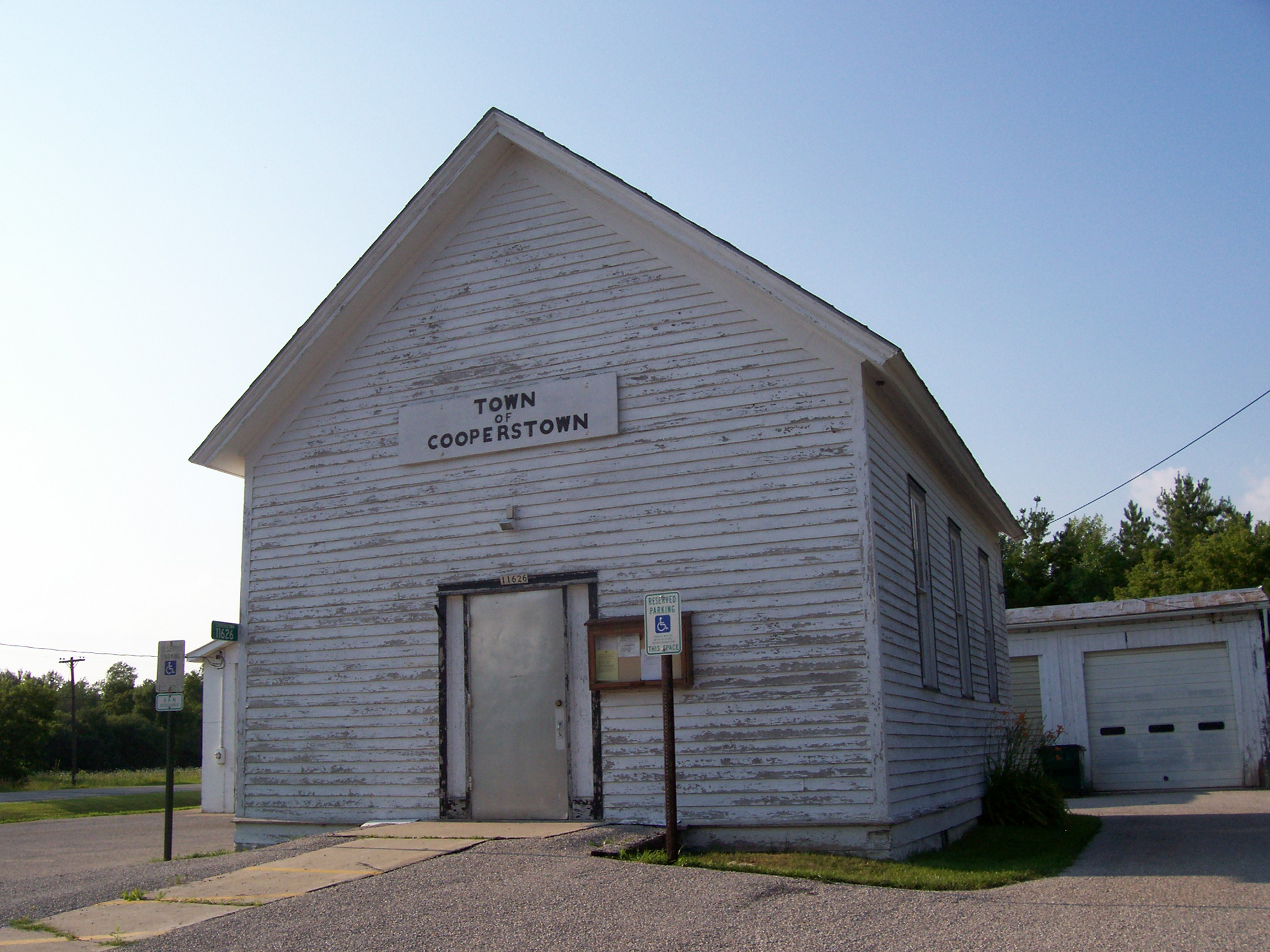
- Town Hall

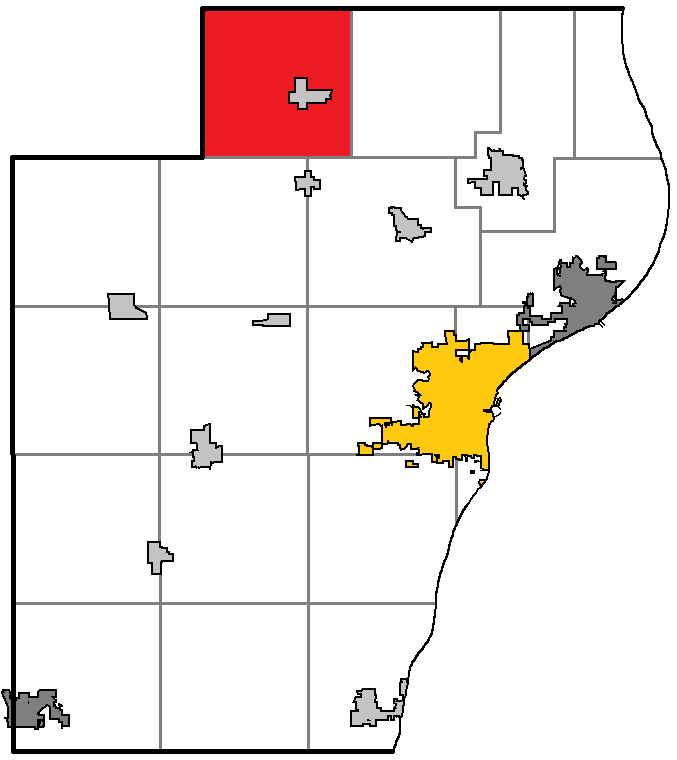
- Location of Cooperstown, within Manitowoc County
- Coordinates: 44°17′1″N 87°49′10″W
- Country: United States
- State: Wisconsin
- County: Manitowoc

Area
  - Total: 35.1 sq mi (91.0 km^{2})
  - Land: 35.1 sq mi (90.9 km^{2})
  - Water: 0.039 sq mi (0.1 km^{2})
- Elevation: 896 ft (273 m)

Population (2020)
  - Total: 1,300
  - Estimate (2025): 1,292
  - Density: 37/sq mi (14/km^{2})
- Time zone: UTC-6 (Central (CST))
  - Summer (DST): UTC-5 (CDT)
- Area code: 920
- FIPS code: 55-16950
- GNIS feature ID: 1583015
- Website: townofcooperstownwi.gov

Cooperstown is a town in Manitowoc County, Wisconsin, United States. As of the 2020 census, the population was 1,300. As of a 2025 estimate, the town population was 1,296.

== Communities ==
- Cooperstown is an unincorporated community located at the intersection of County Road R and Zander Road, three miles northeast of Maribel.
- Hickory Grove is a former community at the intersection of Herold Road and Hickory Grove Road. Light development occupies the immediate area.
- Rosecrans is an unincorporated community one mile west of Maribel at the intersection of County Road Z and Rosecrans Road.

== Geography ==
According to the United States Census Bureau, the town has a total area of 35.1 square miles (90.9 km^{2}), of which 0.04 square miles (0.10 km^{2}) (0.09%) is water.

== Demographics ==
As of the census of 2000, there were 1,403 people, 474 households, and 401 families residing in the town. The population density was 40.0 people per square mile (15.4/km^{2}). There were 489 housing units at an average density of 13.9 per square mile (5.4/km^{2}). The racial makeup of the town was 98.29% White, 0.50% Native American, 0.57% Asian, 0.21% from other races, and 0.43% from two or more races. Hispanic or Latino people of any race were 0.64% of the population.

There were 474 households, out of which 42.4% had children under the age of 18 living with them, 77.0% were married couples living together, 4.6% had a female householder with no husband present, and 15.4% were non-families. 12.0% of all households were made up of individuals, and 4.9% had someone living alone who was 65 years of age or older. The average household size was 2.96 and the average family size was 3.21.

In the town, the population was spread out, with 29.7% under the age of 18, 6.3% from 18 to 24, 30.1% from 25 to 44, 26.3% from 45 to 64, and 7.6% who were 65 years of age or older. The median age was 37 years. For every 100 females, there were 111 males. For every 100 females age 18 and over, there were 112 males.

The median income for a household in the town was $58,177, and the median income for a family was $60,385. Males had a median income of $40,048 versus $23,750 for females. The per capita income for the town was $20,941. About 2.4% of families and 3.8% of the population were below the poverty line, including 4.7% of those under age 18 and 2.0% of those age 65 or over.

== Points of interest ==
- Devil's River State Trail
- Cherney Maribel Caves County Park
