= Taus, Wisconsin =

- Unincorporated community
- Location within Wisconsin Location within the United States
- Coordinates: 44°11′21″N 87°51′43″W
- Country: United States
- State: Wisconsin
- County: Manitowoc
- Elevation: 860 ft (260 m)
- Time zone: UTC-6 (Central (CST))
  - Summer (DST): UTC-5 (CDT)
- Area code: 920
- GNIS feature ID: 1575262

Taus is an unincorporated community located in the town of Franklin, Manitowoc County, Wisconsin, United States.

The community was named for Domažlice, Czech Republic, which is known as Taus in German.

== Images ==
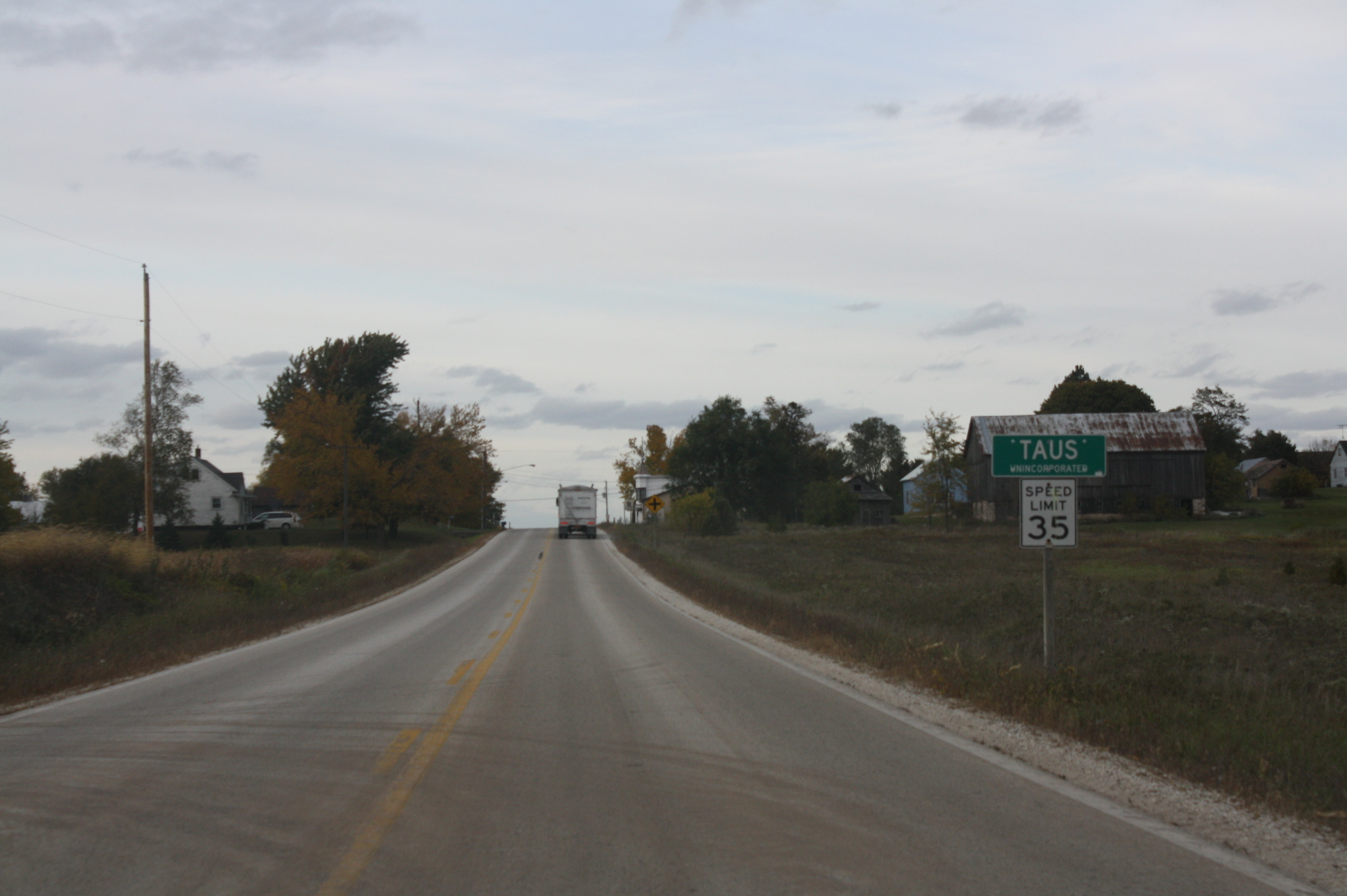
The sign for Taus

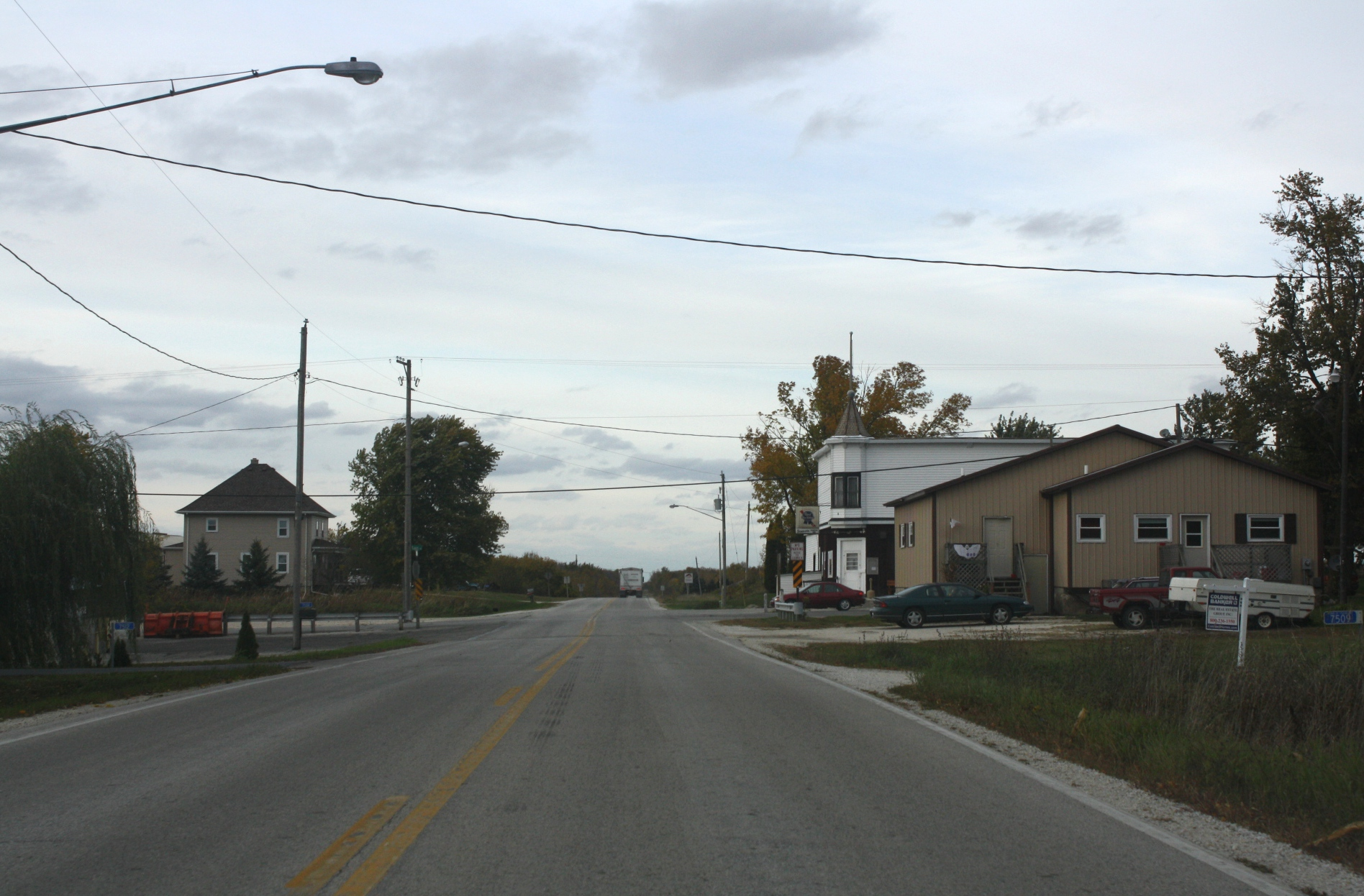
Looking north in downtown Taus
