= Francis Creek (Wisconsin) =

Stream in Manitowoc County, Wisconsin, U.S.

Coordinates: 44°13′50″N 87°42′09″W

Francis Creek is a stream in Manitowoc County, Wisconsin, in the United States.

== History ==
Francis Creek was named after Francis of Assisi.

== See also ==
- List of rivers of Wisconsin
