= Kellnersville, Wisconsin =

- Village
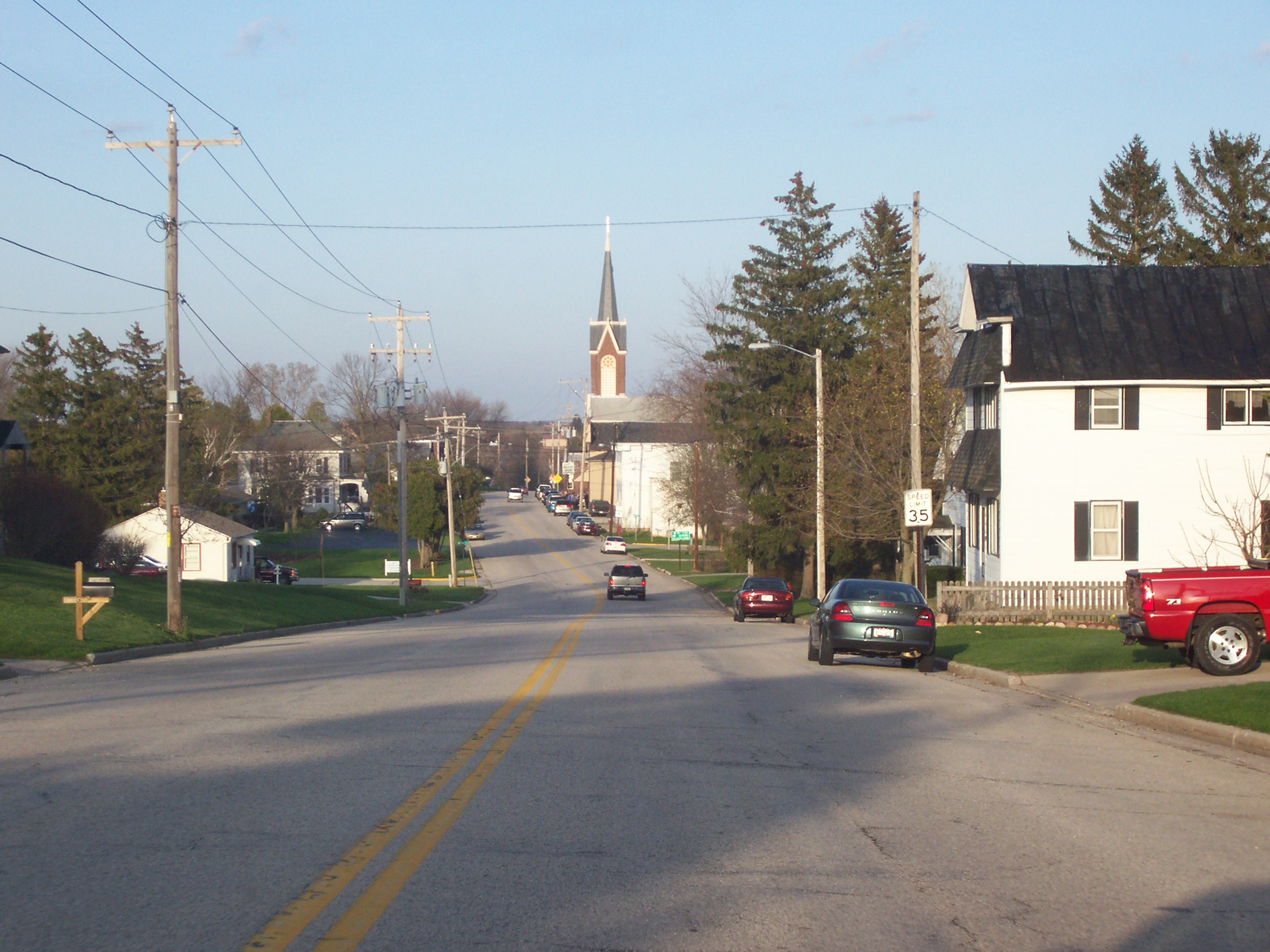

- Location of Kellnersville in Manitowoc County, Wisconsin
- Coordinates: 44°13′30″N 87°48′12″W
- Country: United States
- State: Wisconsin
- County: Manitowoc

Area
  - Total: 0.54 sq mi (1.40 km^{2})
  - Land: 0.54 sq mi (1.40 km^{2})
  - Water: 0 sq mi (0.00 km^{2})
- Elevation: 830 ft (253 m)

Population (2020)
  - Total: 307
  - Density: 589.8/sq mi (227.74/km^{2})
- Time zone: UTC-6 (Central (CST))
  - Summer (DST): UTC-5 (CDT)
- ZIP Code: 54215
- Area code: 920
- FIPS code: 55-39000
- GNIS feature ID: 1567387
- Website: https://kellnersvillewi.gov/

Kellnersville is a village in Manitowoc County, Wisconsin, United States. The population was 307 at the 2020 census.

== Geography ==
Kellnersville is located at 44°13′30″N 87°48′12″W (44.225138, -87.803238).

According to the United States Census Bureau, the village has a total area of 0.54 square miles (1.40 km^{2}), all land.

== Demographics ==
Historical population
| Census | Pop. | Note | %± |
|---|---|---|---|
| 1980 | 369 | | — |
| 1990 | 350 | | −5.1% |
| 2000 | 374 | | 6.9% |
| 2010 | 332 | | −11.2% |
| 2020 | 307 | | −7.5% |
U.S. Decennial Census

=== 2010 census ===
As of the census of 2010, there were 332 people, 160 households, and 94 families living in the village. The population density was 614.8 inhabitants per square mile (237.4/km^{2}). There were 172 housing units at an average density of 318.5 per square mile (123.0/km^{2}). The racial makeup of the village was 99.7% White and 0.3% Native American.

There were 160 households, of which 17.5% had children under the age of 18 living with them, 49.4% were married couples living together, 3.8% had a female householder with no husband present, 5.6% had a male householder with no wife present, and 41.3% were non-families. 37.5% of all households were made up of individuals, and 17.5% had someone living alone who was 65 years of age or older. The average household size was 2.08 and the average family size was 2.73.

The median age in the village was 48.3 years. 15.7% of residents were under the age of 18; 6.5% were between the ages of 18 and 24; 22.5% were from 25 to 44; 35.4% were from 45 to 64; and 19.6% were 65 years of age or older. The gender makeup of the village was 49.7% male and 50.3% female.

=== 2000 census ===
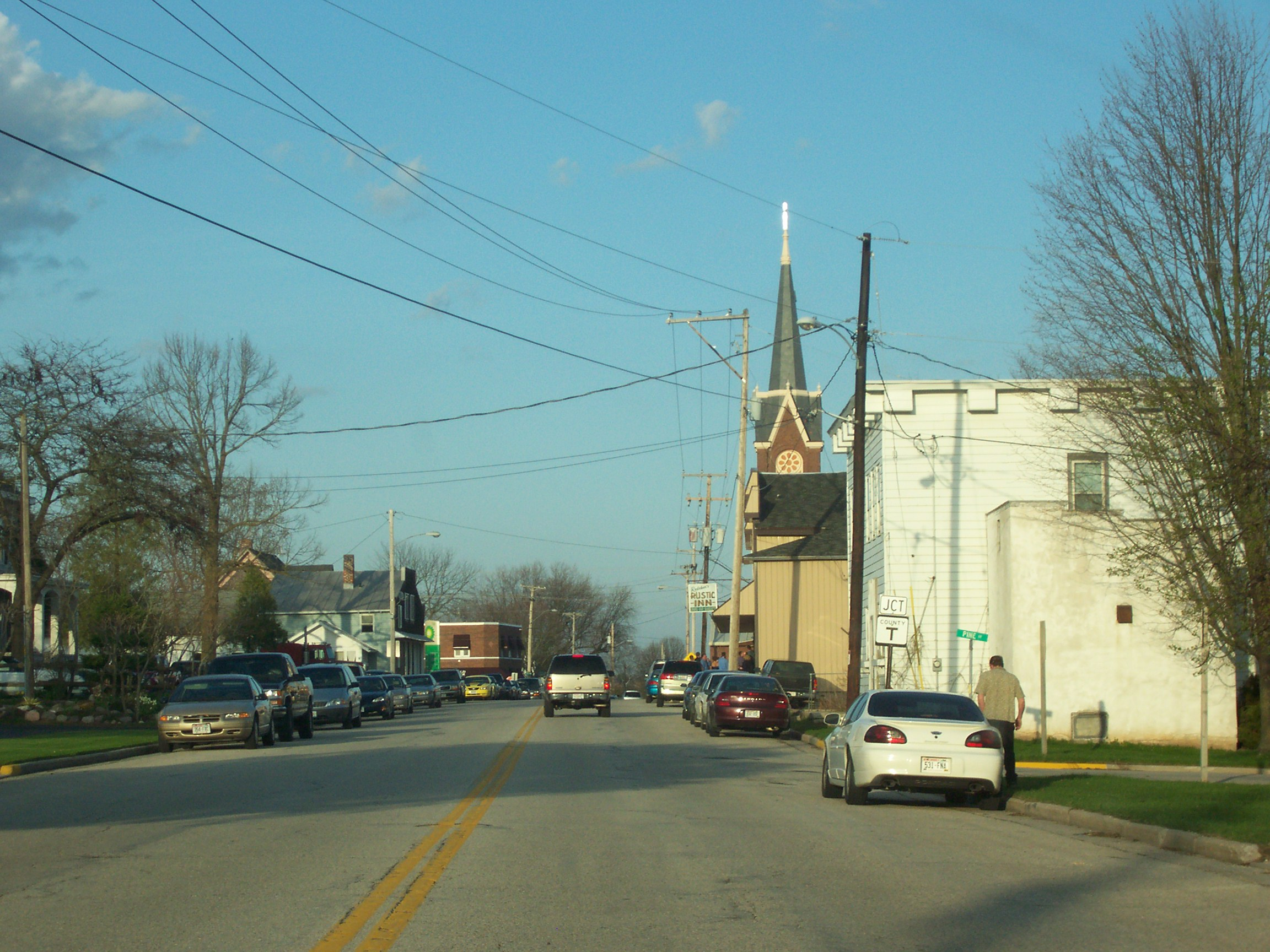
Downtown Kellnersville

As of the census of 2000, there were 374 people, 157 households, and 102 families living in the village. The population density was 694.0 people per square mile (267.4/km^{2}). There were 168 housing units at an average density of 311.8 per square mile (120.1/km^{2}). The racial makeup of the village was 98.66% White, 1.07% Native American, and 0.27% from two or more races.

There were 157 households, out of which 31.2% had children under the age of 18 living with them, 52.2% were married couples living together, 9.6% had a female householder with no husband present, and 34.4% were non-families. 31.2% of all households were made up of individuals, and 15.3% had someone living alone who was 65 years of age or older. The average household size was 2.38 and the average family size was 3.02.

In the village, the population was spread out, with 26.7% under the age of 18, 7.5% from 18 to 24, 32.4% from 25 to 44, 15.8% from 45 to 64, and 17.6% who were 65 years of age or older. The median age was 36 years. For every 100 females, there were 87.9 males. For every 100 females age 18 and over, there were 87.7 males.

The median income for a household in the village was $32,167, and the median income for a family was $47,625. Males had a median income of $37,188 versus $25,000 for females. The per capita income for the village was $16,973. About 6.5% of families and 6.2% of the population were below the poverty line, including 3.1% of those under age 18 and 17.6% of those age 65 or over.

== Events ==
Every year on the third of July, there is a Kellnersville fireworks display to celebrate American Independence Day. The event is sponsored by the Kellnersville Betterment Association (KBA), a volunteer organization that sponsors youth baseball and other activities.
