= Manitowoc County, Wisconsin =

County in Wisconsin, United States

Coordinates: 44.15°N 87.55°W

- County
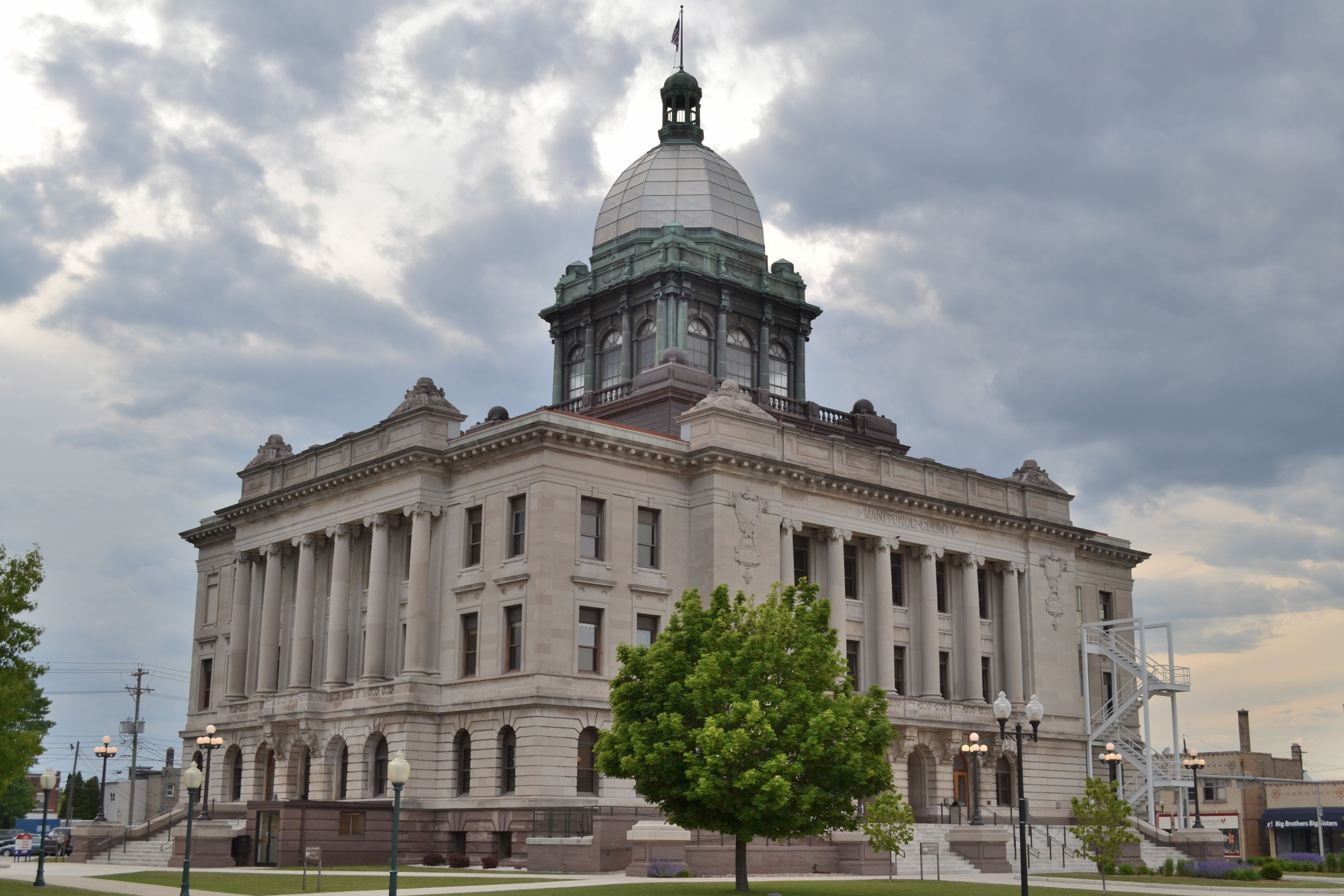
- Manitowoc County Courthouse

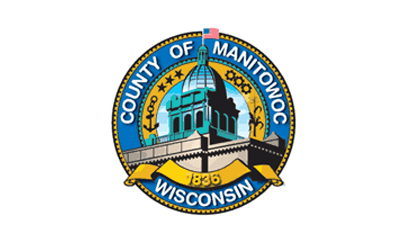
- Flag Seal

- Map of Wisconsin showing Manitowoc County

- Wisconsin's location in the United States
- Country: United States
- State: Wisconsin
- Incorporated: 1848
- County seat: City of Manitowoc
- Incorporated Municipalities: 30 (total): 3 cities; 18 towns; 9 villages

Government
  - Type: County
  - Body: Board of Supervisors
  - Board Chairman: Tyler Martell
  - County Board: 25 commissioners

Area
  - Total: 1,494 sq mi (3,870 km^{2})
  - Land: 589 sq mi (1,530 km^{2})
  - Water: 905 sq mi (2,340 km^{2})
  - Rank: 6th largest county in Wisconsin

Population (2020)
  - Total: 81,359
  - Estimate (2025): 81,710 ▲
  - Rank: 21st largest county in Wisconsin
  - Density: 138.1/sq mi (53.3/km^{2})
- Time zone: UTC−6 (Central)
  - Summer (DST): UTC−5 (Central)
- Area codes: 920
- Congressional districts: 6th
- State Routes: link = Highway 32 (Wisconsin) link = Highway 42 (Wisconsin) link = Highway 57 (Wisconsin) link = Highway 67 (Wisconsin) link = Highway 147 (Wisconsin) link = Highway 310 (Wisconsin)
- Airports: Manitowoc County Airport
- Waterways: Lake Michigan – Manitowoc River
- Public transit: Maritime Metro Transit
- Website: manitowoccountywi.gov

Manitowoc County (/ˈmænɪtəwɒk/ MAN-it-ə-wok) is a county in the U.S. state of Wisconsin. As of the 2020 census, the population was 81,359. Its county seat is Manitowoc. The county was created in 1836 prior to Wisconsin's statehood and organized in 1848. Manitowoc County comprises the Manitowoc, WI Micropolitan Statistical Area.

== Geography ==
According to the U.S. Census Bureau, the county has a total area of 1,494 square miles (3,870 km^{2}), of which 589 square miles (1,530 km^{2}) is land and 905 square miles (2,340 km^{2}) (61%) is water.

=== Major highways ===
- Interstate 43
- U.S. Highway 10
- U.S. Highway 151
- Highway 32 (Wisconsin)
- Highway 42 (Wisconsin)
- Highway 57 (Wisconsin)
- Highway 67 (Wisconsin)
- Highway 147 (Wisconsin)
- Highway 310 (Wisconsin)

=== Railroads ===
- Canadian National

=== Buses ===
- Maritime Metro Transit

=== Airport ===
Manitowoc County Airport (KMTW) serves the county and surrounding communities.

=== Adjacent counties ===
- Brown County – northwest
- Kewaunee County – northeast
- Sheboygan County – south
- Calumet County – west
- Mason County, Michigan – east and southeast
- Manistee County, Michigan – northeast

=== National marine sanctuary ===
The Wisconsin Shipwreck Coast National Marine Sanctuary was established in 2021 in the waters of Lake Michigan, with most of its northern half lying off Manitowoc County's coast. The national marine sanctuary is the site of a large number of historically significant shipwrecks.

== Climate ==
Manitowoc County

Climate chart (precipitation, max. and min. temperature)
J	F	M	A	M	J	J	A	S	O	N	D
62 −6 −8	62 −6 −11	66 3 −3	141 9 2	105 12 2	106 21 9	108 19 14	88 18 18	72 19 12	121 9 5	68 5 2	61 1 −2
- █ Average max. and min. temperatures in °C
- █ Precipitation totals in mm
Imperial conversion
J	F	M	A	M	J	J	A	S	O	N	D
2.4 21 18	2.4 21 12	2.6 37 27	5.6 48 36	4.1 54 36	4.2 70 48	4.3 66 57	3.5 64 64	2.8 66 54	4.8 48 41	2.7 41 36	2.4 34 28
- █ Average max. and min. temperatures in °F
- █ Precipitation totals in inches

== Demographics ==
Historical population
Census	Pop.	Note	%±
1840	235		—
1850	3,702		1,475.3%
1860	22,416		505.5%
1870	33,364		48.8%
1880	37,505		12.4%
1890	37,831		0.9%
1900	42,261		11.7%
1910	44,978		6.4%
1920	51,644		14.8%
1930	58,674		13.6%
1940	61,617		5.0%
1950	67,159		9.0%
1960	75,215		12.0%
1970	82,294		9.4%
1980	82,918		0.8%
1990	80,421		−3.0%
2000	82,887		3.1%
2010	81,442		−1.7%
2020	81,359		−0.1%
2025 (est.)	81,710	▲	0.4%
U.S. Decennial Census; 1790–1960 1900–1990; 1990–2000 2010–2020

=== Racial and ethnic composition ===
Manitowoc County, Wisconsin – Racial and ethnic composition Note: the US Census treats Hispanic/Latino as an ethnic category. This table excludes Latinos from the racial categories and assigns them to a separate category. Hispanics/Latinos may be of any race.
Race / ethnicity (NH = Non-Hispanic)	Pop 1980	Pop 1990	Pop 2000	Pop 2010	Pop 2020	% 1980	% 1990	% 2000	% 2010	% 2020
White alone (NH)	81,625	78,360	78,756	75,210	70,951	98.44%	97.44%	95.02%	92.35%	87.21%
Black or African American alone (NH)	70	113	227	412	1,027	0.08%	0.14%	0.27%	0.51%	1.26%
Native American or Alaska Native alone (NH)	311	310	338	395	371	0.38%	0.39%	0.41%	0.49%	0.46%
Asian alone (NH)	187	1,044	1,637	2,027	2,247	0.23%	1.30%	1.97%	2.49%	2.76%
Native Hawaiian or Pacific Islander alone (NH)	x	x	29	10	15	x	x	0.03%	0.01%	0.02%
Other race alone (NH)	203	12	17	51	212	0.24%	0.01%	0.02%	0.06%	0.26%
Mixed race or Multiracial (NH)	x	x	540	772	2,486	x	x	0.65%	0.95%	3.06%
Hispanic or Latino (any race)	522	582	1,343	2,565	4,050	0.63%	0.72%	1.62%	3.15%	4.98%
Total	82,918	80,421	82,887	81,442	81,359	100.00%	100.00%	100.00%	100.00%	100.00%

=== 2020 census ===
As of the 2020 census, the county had a population of 81,359. The population density was 138.1 people per square mile (53.3 people/km^{2}), and there were 37,818 housing units at an average density of 64.2 units per square mile (24.8 units/km^{2}).

The median age was 45.1 years, with 20.6% of residents under the age of 18 and 21.4% aged 65 years or older.

For every 100 females there were 101.4 males, and for every 100 females age 18 and over there were 99.4 males.

The racial makeup of the county was 88.5% White, 1.3% Black or African American, 0.6% American Indian and Alaska Native, 2.8% Asian, <0.1% Native Hawaiian and Pacific Islander, 1.8% from some other race, and 4.9% from two or more races. Hispanic or Latino residents of any race comprised 5.0% of the population.

57.2% of residents lived in urban areas, while 42.8% lived in rural areas.

There were 34,995 households in the county, of which 24.4% had children under the age of 18 living in them. Of all households, 49.1% were married-couple households, 20.4% were households with a male householder and no spouse or partner present, and 22.9% were households with a female householder and no spouse or partner present. About 31.6% of all households were made up of individuals and 14.2% had someone living alone who was 65 years of age or older.

There were 37,818 housing units, of which 7.5% were vacant. Among occupied housing units, 73.5% were owner-occupied and 26.5% were renter-occupied. The homeowner vacancy rate was 1.2% and the rental vacancy rate was 7.5%.

=== 2000 census ===
2000 Census age pyramid for Manitowoc County

The 2000 census shows Manitowoc County as having 82,887 people, 32,721 households and 22,348 families. The population density was 140 people per square mile (54 people/km^{2}). There were 34,651 housing units at an average density of 59 units per square mile (23 units/km^{2}). The racial makeup of the county was 95.90% White, 0.30% Black or African American, 0.43% Native American, 1.98% Asian, 0.04% Pacific Islander, 0.60% from other races, and 0.76% from two or more races. 1.62% of the population were Hispanic or Latino of any race. 53.7% were of German, 7.3% Polish, 5.3% Czech and 5.0% American ancestry. 95.2% spoke English, 1.8% Spanish, 1.3% Hmong and 1.1% German as their first language.

There were 32,721 households, out of which 31.50% had children under the age of 18 living with them, 57.10% were married couples living together, 7.50% had a female householder with no husband present, and 31.70% were non-families. 26.80% of all households were made up of individuals, and 12.10% had someone living alone who was 65 years of age or older. The average household size was 2.49 and the average family size was 3.04.

In the county, the age distribution is 25.5% under the age of 18, 7.60% from 18 to 24, 28.20% from 25 to 44, 23% from 45 to 64, and 15.70% who were 65 years of age or older. The median age was 38 years. For every 100 females there were 98.20 males. For every 100 females age 18 and over, there were 96.10 males.

=== Vital statistics ===
In 2017, there were 780 births, giving a general fertility rate of 60.2 births per 1000 women aged 15–44, the 27th lowest rate out of all 72 Wisconsin counties.

== Government ==
The county executive is Bob Ziegelbauer. He is serving his fourth term in that position after being elected in April 2006 and reelected in April 2010, April 2014, and April 2018. The county is served by a 25-member county board.

== Politics ==
United States presidential election results for Manitowoc County, Wisconsin
Year	Republican		Democratic		Third party(ies)	
Year	No.	%	No.	%	No.	%
1892	2,249	33.64%	4,349	65.06%	87	1.30%
1896	4,430	51.57%	3,919	45.62%	242	2.82%
1900	4,317	49.50%	4,167	47.78%	238	2.73%
1904	4,626	53.28%	3,274	37.71%	783	9.02%
1908	4,126	45.39%	3,952	43.47%	1,013	11.14%
1912	2,389	31.11%	3,436	44.74%	1,855	24.15%
1916	4,224	46.46%	4,338	47.72%	529	5.82%
1920	8,378	61.70%	2,018	14.86%	3,183	23.44%
1924	4,828	29.54%	1,599	9.78%	9,918	60.68%
1928	7,519	41.70%	10,292	57.08%	221	1.23%
1932	4,573	21.98%	15,696	75.44%	536	2.58%
1936	5,094	21.20%	15,539	64.68%	3,393	14.12%
1940	12,616	48.29%	13,142	50.30%	368	1.41%
1944	14,047	53.52%	11,949	45.53%	251	0.96%
1948	10,947	44.03%	13,401	53.90%	515	2.07%
1952	18,950	61.32%	11,879	38.44%	72	0.23%
1956	18,078	61.91%	10,800	36.99%	321	1.10%
1960	14,622	45.58%	17,423	54.31%	35	0.11%
1964	9,849	30.96%	21,927	68.92%	39	0.12%
1968	13,562	44.23%	15,298	49.89%	1,801	5.87%
1972	16,599	48.51%	16,489	48.19%	1,132	3.31%
1976	16,039	43.62%	19,819	53.90%	913	2.48%
1980	18,591	48.00%	17,330	44.74%	2,811	7.26%
1984	19,639	52.54%	17,250	46.15%	487	1.30%
1988	16,020	44.52%	19,680	54.69%	287	0.80%
1992	14,008	33.94%	15,903	38.54%	11,357	27.52%
1996	13,239	38.44%	16,750	48.63%	4,455	12.93%
2000	19,358	49.86%	17,667	45.51%	1,799	4.63%
2004	23,027	52.14%	20,652	46.77%	481	1.09%
2008	19,234	45.35%	22,428	52.88%	752	1.77%
2012	21,604	50.69%	20,403	47.88%	610	1.43%
2016	23,244	56.99%	14,538	35.64%	3,004	7.37%
2020	27,218	60.72%	16,818	37.52%	793	1.77%
2024	28,200	60.89%	17,399	37.57%	717	1.55%

Manitowoc County is fairly competitive in presidential elections; in 2016, Donald Trump became the first candidate since Lyndon B. Johnson from his 1964 landslide to win more than 55% of the vote. He expanded his share to over 60% during the 2020 election, the first time since Dwight D. Eisenhower in his 1956 landslide that a Republican has hit 60% of the vote in the county. Trump continued this upward trend in 2024, albeit slightly. Statewide, Manitowoc County has voted Republican since the 2002 gubernatorial election.

== Communities ==
=== Cities ===
- Kiel (partly in Calumet County)
- Manitowoc (county seat)
- Two Rivers

=== Villages ===
- Cleveland
- Francis Creek
- Kellnersville
- Maribel
- Mishicot
- Reedsville
- St. Nazianz
- Valders
- Whitelaw

=== Towns ===
- Cato
- Centerville
- Cooperstown
- Eaton
- Franklin
- Gibson
- Kossuth
- Liberty
- Manitowoc
- Manitowoc Rapids
- Maple Grove
- Meeme
- Mishicot
- Newton
- Rockland
- Schleswig
- Two Creeks
- Two Rivers

=== Census-designated places ===
- Clarks Mills
- Collins

=== Unincorporated communities ===
- Branch
- Cato
- Cato Falls
- Clover
- Cooperstown
- Duveneck
- Fisherville
- Grimms
- Hickory Grove
- Kellners Corners
- Kingsbridge
- Larrabee
- Louis Corners
- Madsen
- Maple Grove
- Meeme
- Meggers (partial)
- Melnik
- Menchalville
- Millhome
- Newton
- Newtonburg
- North Grimms
- Northeim
- Osman
- Reifs Mills
- Rockville
- Rockwood
- Rosecrans
- Rube
- School Hill
- Shoto
- Spring Valley
- Steinthal
- Taus
- Tisch Mills (partial)
- Two Creeks
- Wells (partial)
- Zander

==== At night ====
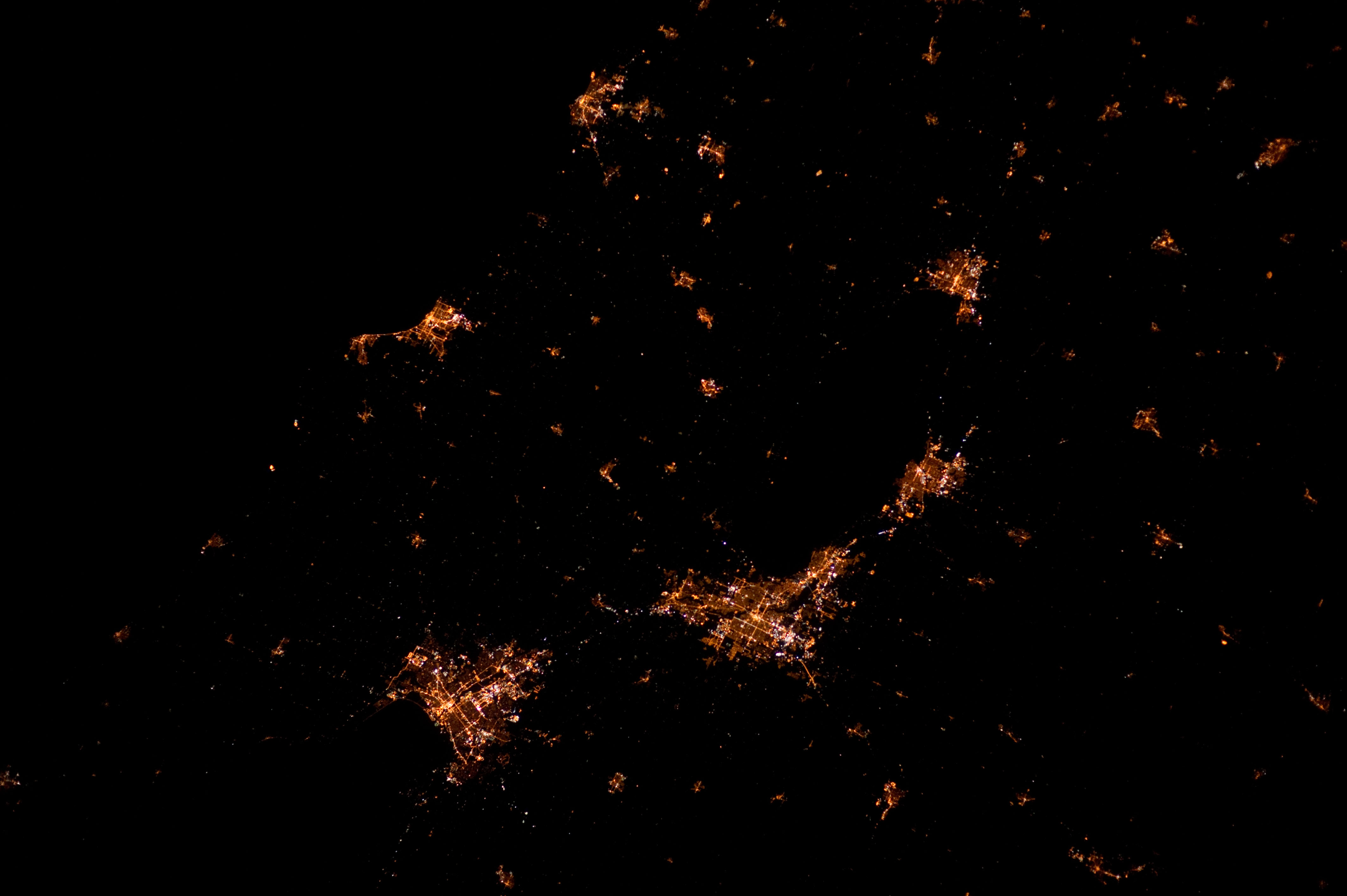
The bright light on the lakeshore to the far left is the Point Beach Nuclear Plant. Taken at 3:09:47 A.M. CDT on March 28, 2012, from an altitude of 211 nautical miles (391 km) during ISS Expedition 30.

== Education ==
School districts include:

- Brillion School District
- Chilton School District
- Denmark School District
- Howards Grove School District
- Kewaunee School District
- Kiel Area School District
- Manitowoc Public School District
- Mishicot School District
- Reedsville School District
- Sheboygan Area School District
- Two Rivers School District
- Valders Area School District

Silver Lake College, later Holy Family College, was in the county.

== In the media ==
The Netflix documentary series Making a Murderer (2015) explores the arrests and trials in 2007 of Manitowoc County residents Steven Avery and his nephew Brendan Dassey for the murder of Teresa Halbach, who disappeared in October 2005. The series describes an earlier wrongful conviction of Avery, for which he served 18 years, and his subsequent lawsuit against Manitowoc County. It then focuses on the procedures of the Calumet County Sheriff's Office and the Manitowoc County Sheriff's Department, which investigated the later Halbach case. The Sheriffs officers have come under intense scrutiny for their involvement in the Halbach case due to Steven Avery's $36 million lawsuit and their questionable police and investigative techniques.

In 2017, Charlie Berens created a comedic short-form video series called Manitowoc Minute, which features a fictitious news presenter character who exaggerates the culture and dialect of Wisconsin.

== Gallery ==
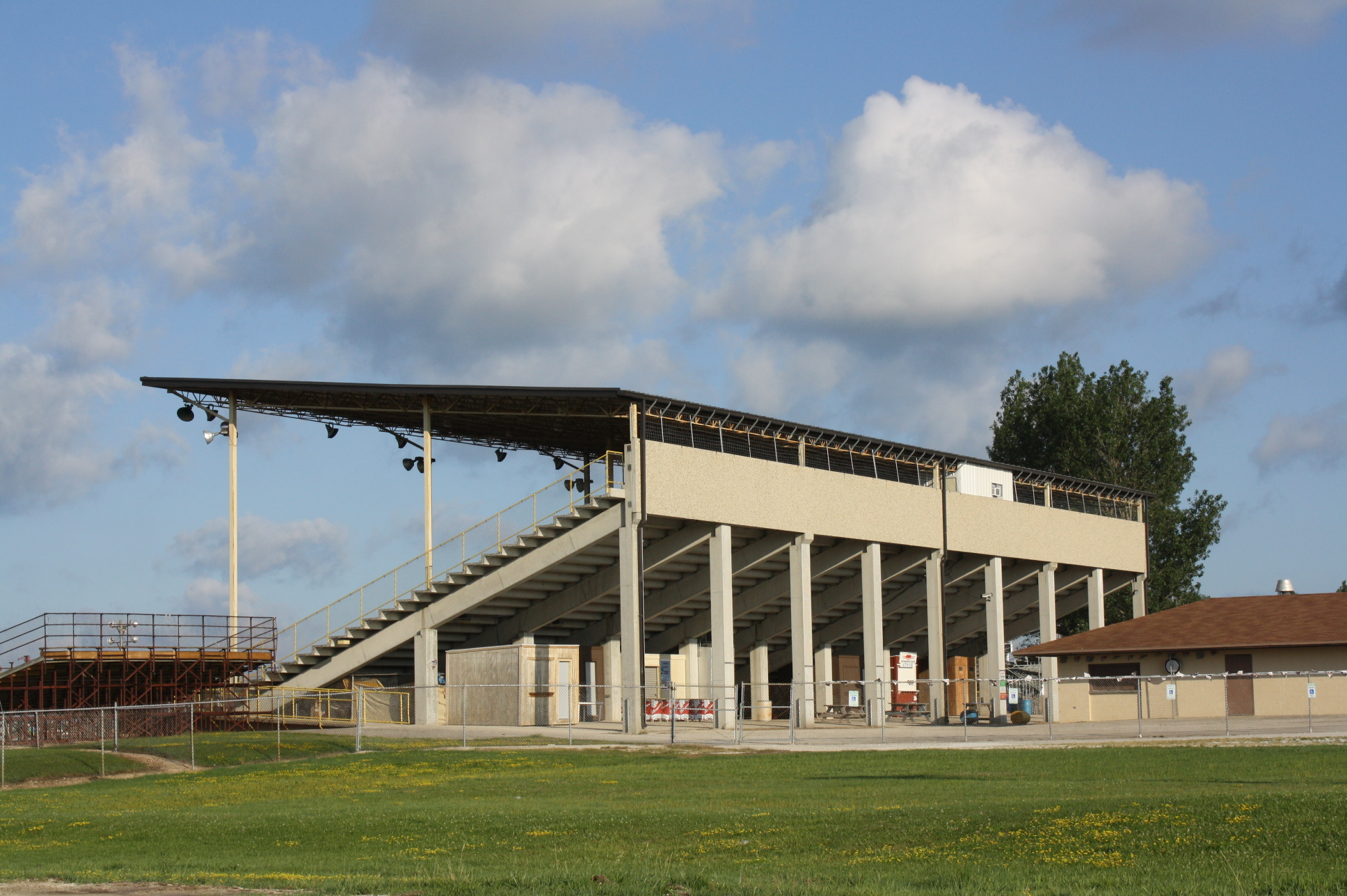
Manitowoc County Expo Grounds

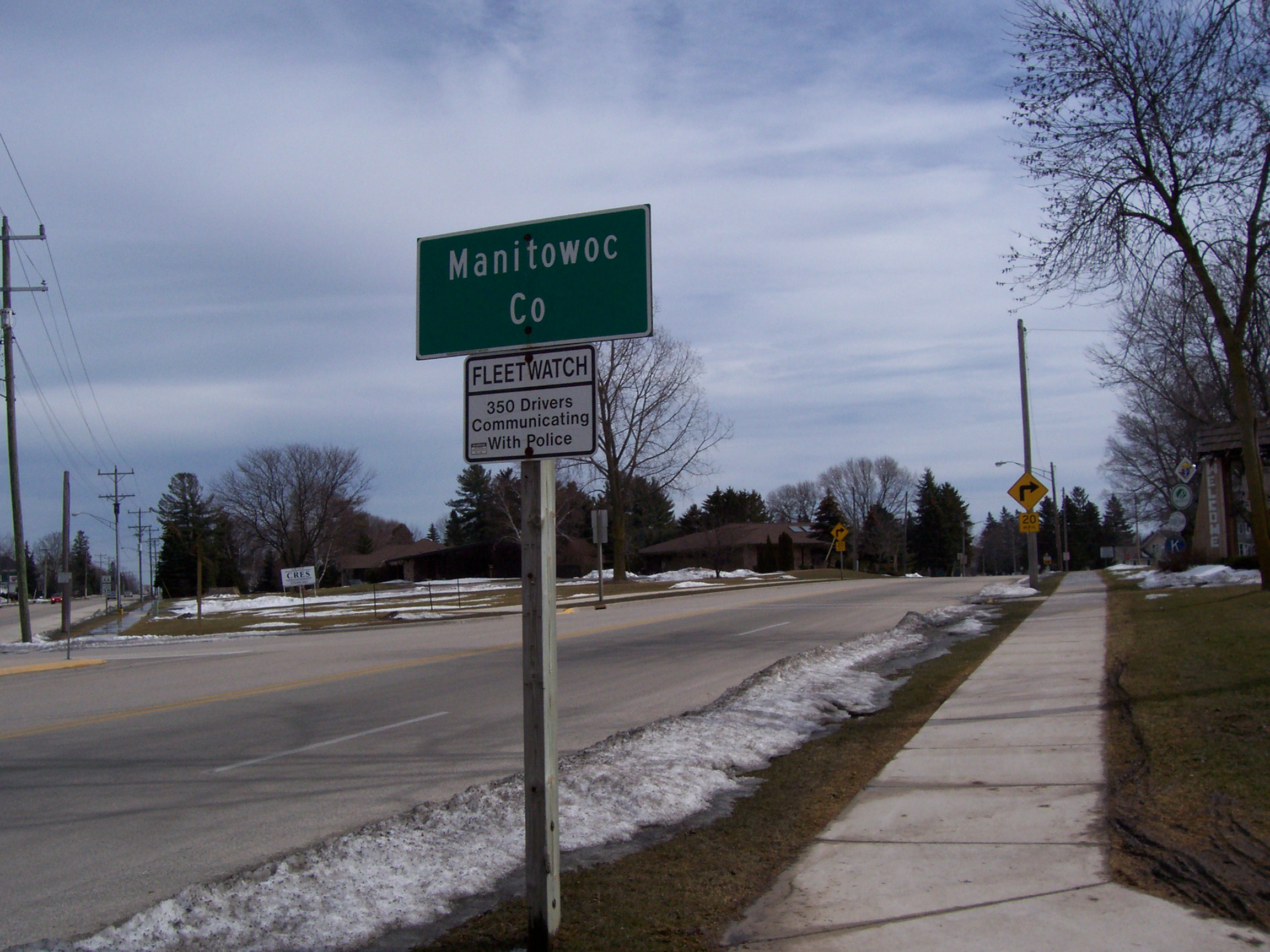
Sign marking entrance to Manitowoc County in Kiel

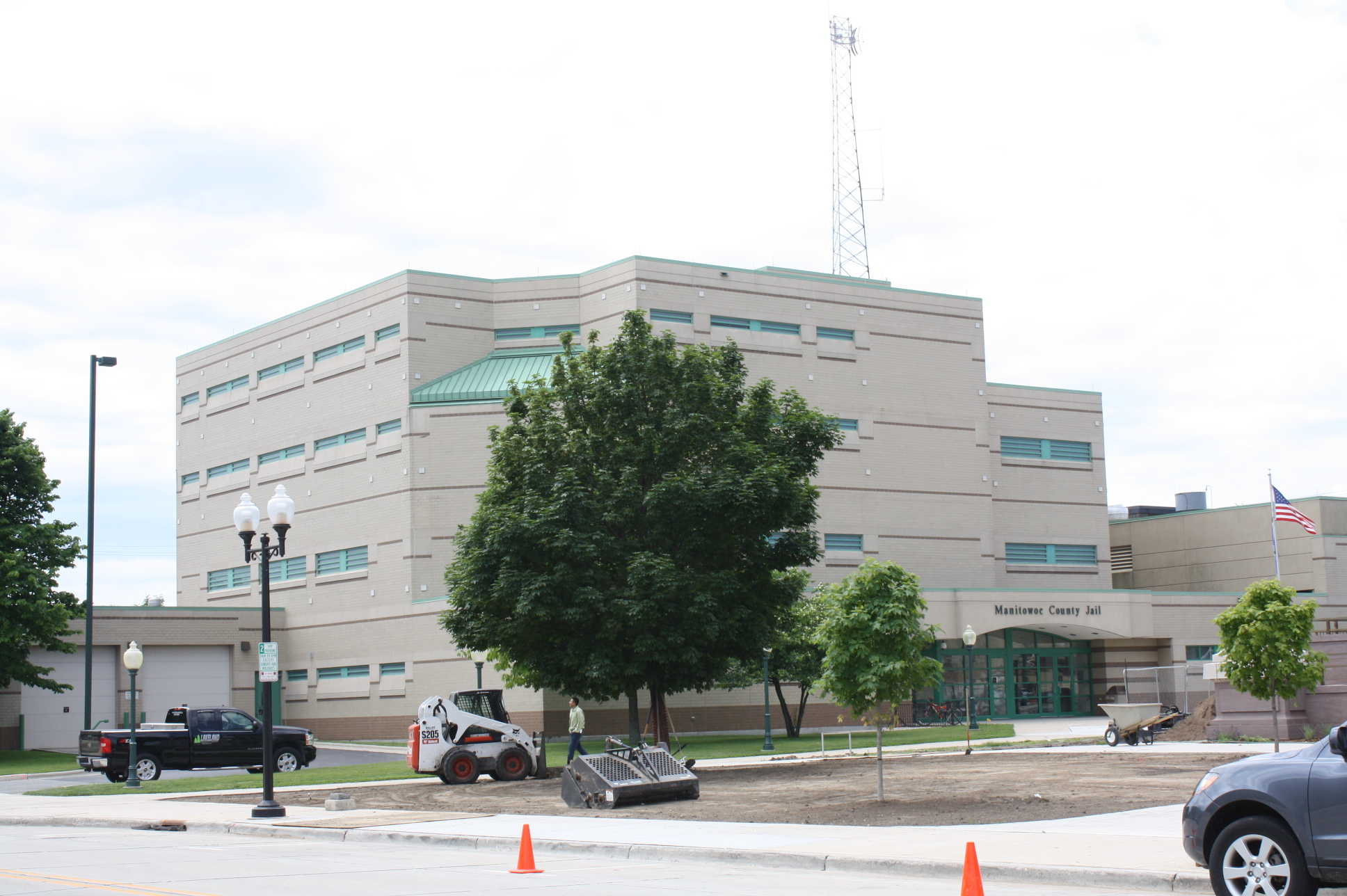
Manitowoc County Jail

== See also ==
- National Register of Historic Places listings in Manitowoc County, Wisconsin
