= Red Raven =

Red Raven or Red Ravens may refer to:

== Comics, animation, and pulp fiction ==
- Red Raven (Marvel Comics), the name of three Marvel comic book characters, beginning with Timely Comics' Red Raven in 1940
  - Red Raven Comics, where the original Red Raven first appeared
- Red Raven (manga), shōnen manga by Shinta Fujimoto
- Red Raven Library, an early twentieth century pirate adventure pulp magazine published by Street & Smith

== Music ==
- "Red Raven", a polka standard, with variant arrangements under the names "Red Raven Rag", "Red Raven Polka", and "Red Raven Waltz"
- Red Raven Orchestra, Lawrence Duchow's polka band
- "Red Raven", song by John Keane on the 1999 album Straight Away

== Other ==
- Coffeyville Red Ravens, the sports teams of Coffeyville Community College
- Red Raven Magic Mirror, a 1956 adaption of the praxinoscope
- Red Raven, a fashion line by Dorothy Grant
- Red Raven (Middle Persian "Shar-Duly"), an ancient Türkic dynastic tribe ancestral to Prince Kül-Tegin (fl. 6th century)
- Red Raven, 4K camera from Red Digital Cinema Camera Company
- Red Raven Split, an American hangover cure sold 1890s – 1930
