= Herman Roethel =

American politician

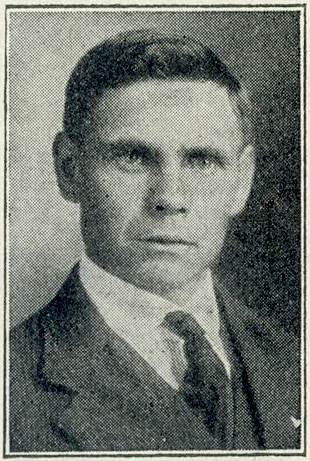
Roethel's official State Assembly portrait, 1919

Herman Roethel (January 3, 1882 – February 17, 1956) was a Wisconsin farmer from Kiel, Wisconsin, United States, who served two terms as a member of the Wisconsin State Assembly, first being elected as a Socialist, and later as a Republican.

== Background ==
Roethel was born January 3, 1882, on a farm in the town of Meeme in Manitowoc County, received a public school education and attended the short course in agriculture at the University of Wisconsin. He lived on the same farm for 32 years, making a specialty of raising pure bred Berkshire hogs and Jersey cattle on which he secured many prizes at the state and county fairs for several years. He raised barley and corn on 140 acres (0.57 km^{2}); was active in the Wisconsin Agricultural Experiment Association, and from 1909 to 1915 was president of the Manitowoc County branch. In 1914 he sold his farm and moved to Kiel, assisted in organizing the Kiel Mercantile Association and became director and livestock shipper.

== Political career ==
He had served as school clerk and village assessor before being elected to the Assembly in 1918, receiving 1,556 votes to 1,436 for Democrat Martin Rappel.

== Assembly ==
He was elected as a Socialist in 1918 from the second Manitowoc County district (the Towns of Cato, Cooperstown, Eaton, Franklin, Gibson, Kossuth, Maple Grove, Mishicot, Rockland, Schleswig, Two Creeks and Two Rivers; the Villages of Kiel and Reedsville and the City of Two Rivers), with 1,556 votes to 1,436 for Democratic incumbent Martin Rappel. He was assigned to the standing committee on agriculture, and to a special joint committee investigating the State Historical Society of Wisconsin.

He was defeated in 1920 by Republican Thomas A. Sullivan in a three-cornered contest: Sullivan receiving 3,084 votes to 1,744 for Roethel and 1,285 for Democrat David LeClair. In 1926, by then retired and living on a few acres of land in Kiel and serving as fire chief for the Kiel volunteer fire department, he was elected to the Assembly as a Republican, receiving 3,052 votes to 1,138 votes for perennial Democratic nominee David LeClair. In the 1928 Republican primary election Roethel was defeated by the same Thomas A. Sullivan who had defeated him for re-election in the 1920 general election; Sullivan went on to defeat LeClair in the November general election.

== Death ==
Roethel died on February 17, 1956, in Sheboygan, Wisconsin.
