= Otto Lerche =

American politician

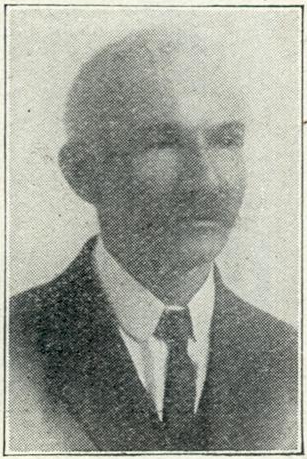
Lerche's official State Assembly portrait, 1919

Otto Lerche (September 16, 1861 – March 22, 1930) was a farmer and cement contractor from Potter, Wisconsin. He was elected in 1918 as a Socialist state representative, the first Socialist ever elected to the Wisconsin State Assembly from Calumet County (although in the same election, Lerche's neighbor Henry Kleist was elected to the Wisconsin State Senate from the district). He served one term.

== Early years ==
Lerche was born in the Town of Rantoul in Calumet County and was educated in the district schools.

== Career before politics ==
Prior to his election to the assembly, he had been director of a mutual fire insurance company since 1886; school clerk since 1887, supervisor from 1893 to 1902, town clerk from 1902 to 1914; and had served as a justice of the peace.

== Political career ==
He was elected to the assembly in 1918, receiving 1,265 votes to 831 for James L. Cooneh, a Democrat.

== Death ==
He died of a stroke on March 22, 1930.
