= Collins, Wisconsin =

Census-designated place in Wisconsin, United States

Collins
- Census-designated place
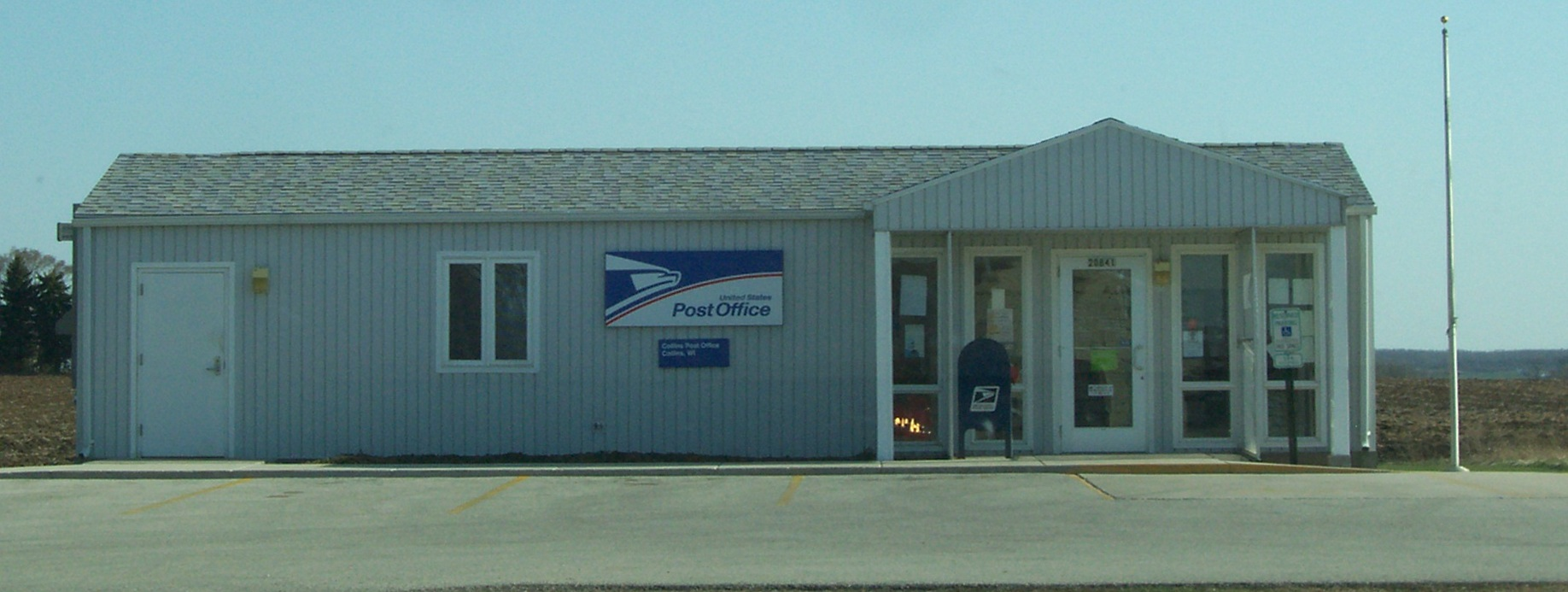
- Collins post office

- Location within the state of Wisconsin
- Coordinates: 44°05′08″N 87°58′58″W
- Country: United States
- State: Wisconsin
- County: Manitowoc

Area
  - Total: 0.496 sq mi (1.28 km^{2})
  - Land: 0.496 sq mi (1.28 km^{2})
  - Water: 0 sq mi (0 km^{2})
- Elevation: 814 ft (248 m)

Population (2020)
  - Total: 203
  - Density: 409/sq mi (158/km^{2})
- Time zone: UTC-6 (Central (CST))
  - Summer (DST): UTC-5 (CDT)
- ZIP code: 54207
- Area code: 920
- GNIS feature ID: 1563267

Collins is an unincorporated census-designated place in the town of Rockland, Manitowoc County, Wisconsin, United States, in the east central part of the state. Its zip code is 54207, although its post office is being studied for closure. As of the 2020 census, its population was 203, down from 164 at the 2010 census.

The Collins Marsh Wildlife Area is located east of the community.

== Etymology ==
The community was named for Sumner J. Collins, who was the general superintendent of the Wisconsin Central Railroad in the 1890s.

== Transportation ==
Wisconsin Highway 32 ran through the community; the route later became Wisconsin Highway 67 before it became County Highway W. County Highway JJ and the Wisconsin Central Ltd. railroad runs east–west through the community.

== Geography ==
Collins has an area of 0.496 square miles (1.28 km^{2}), all land.

== Notable people ==
- Martin Rappel, farmer, politician and businessman; lived in Collins and was involved with the Collins State Bank

== Images ==
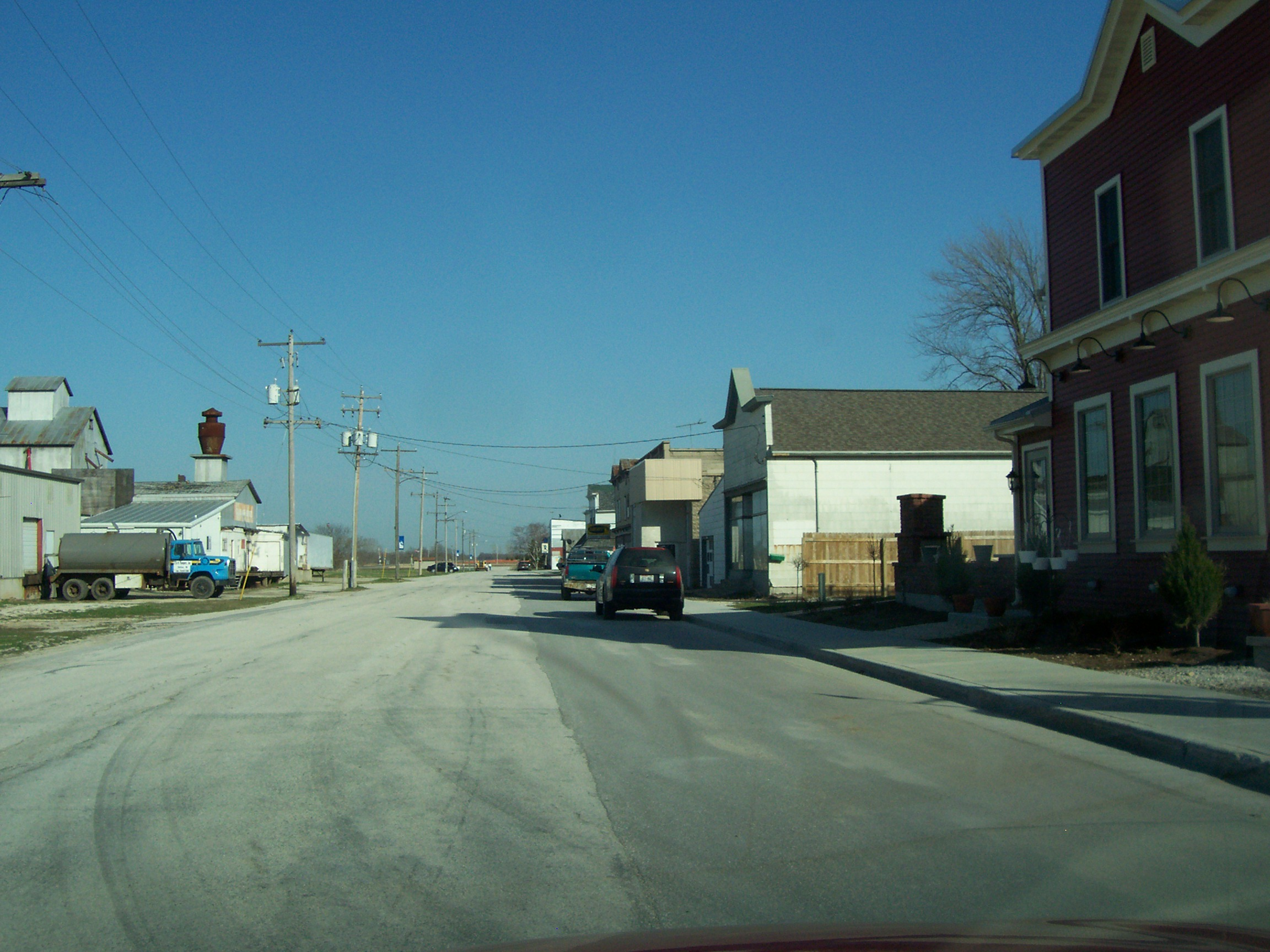
Looking east at downtown Collins

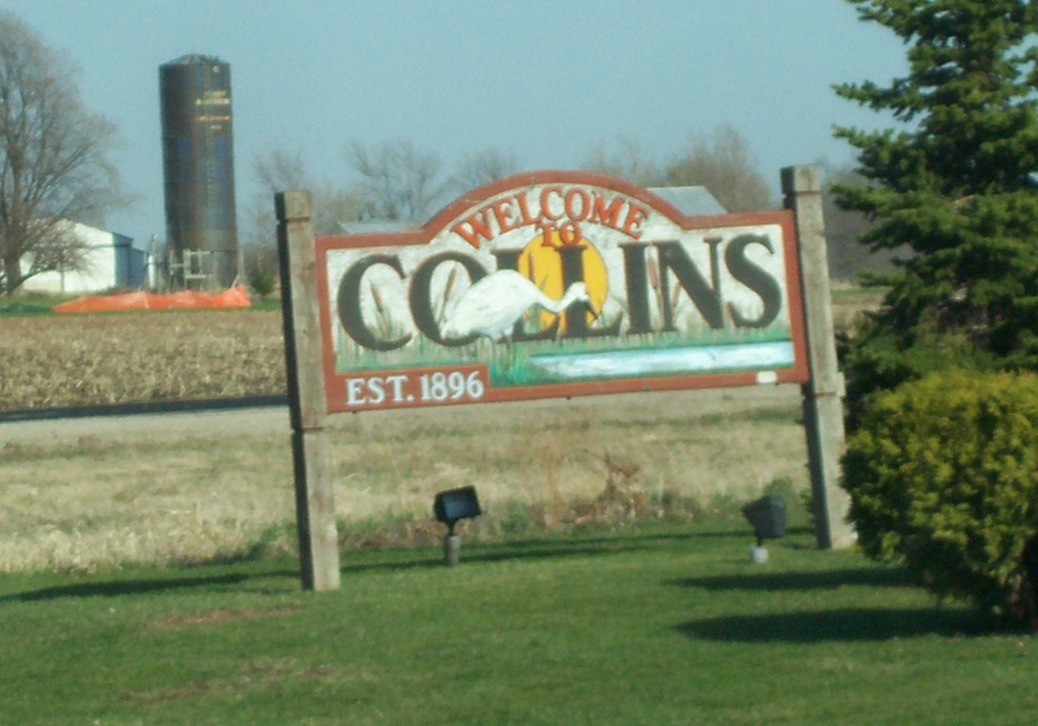
Welcome sign

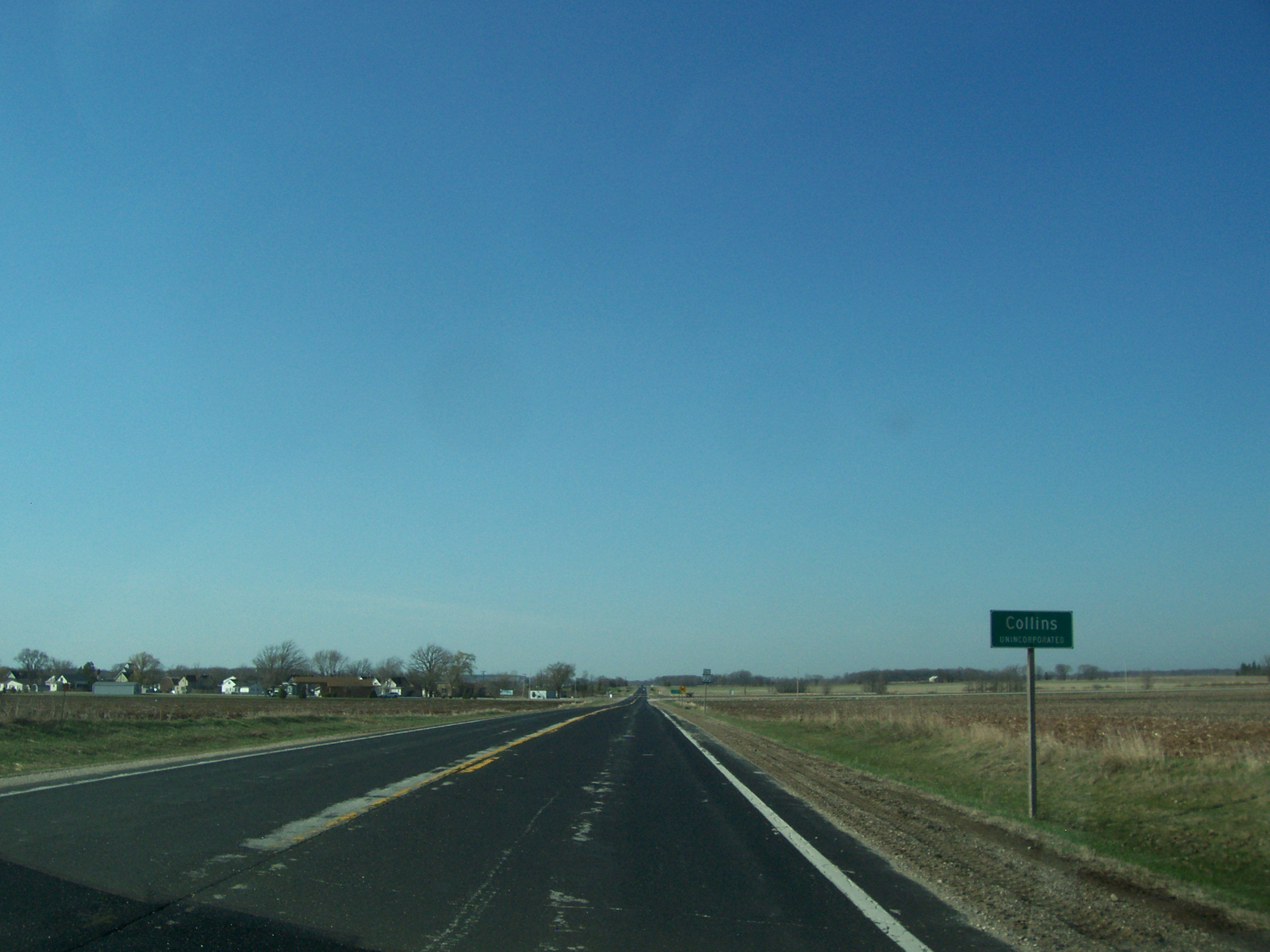
Looking north at DOT sign and the community

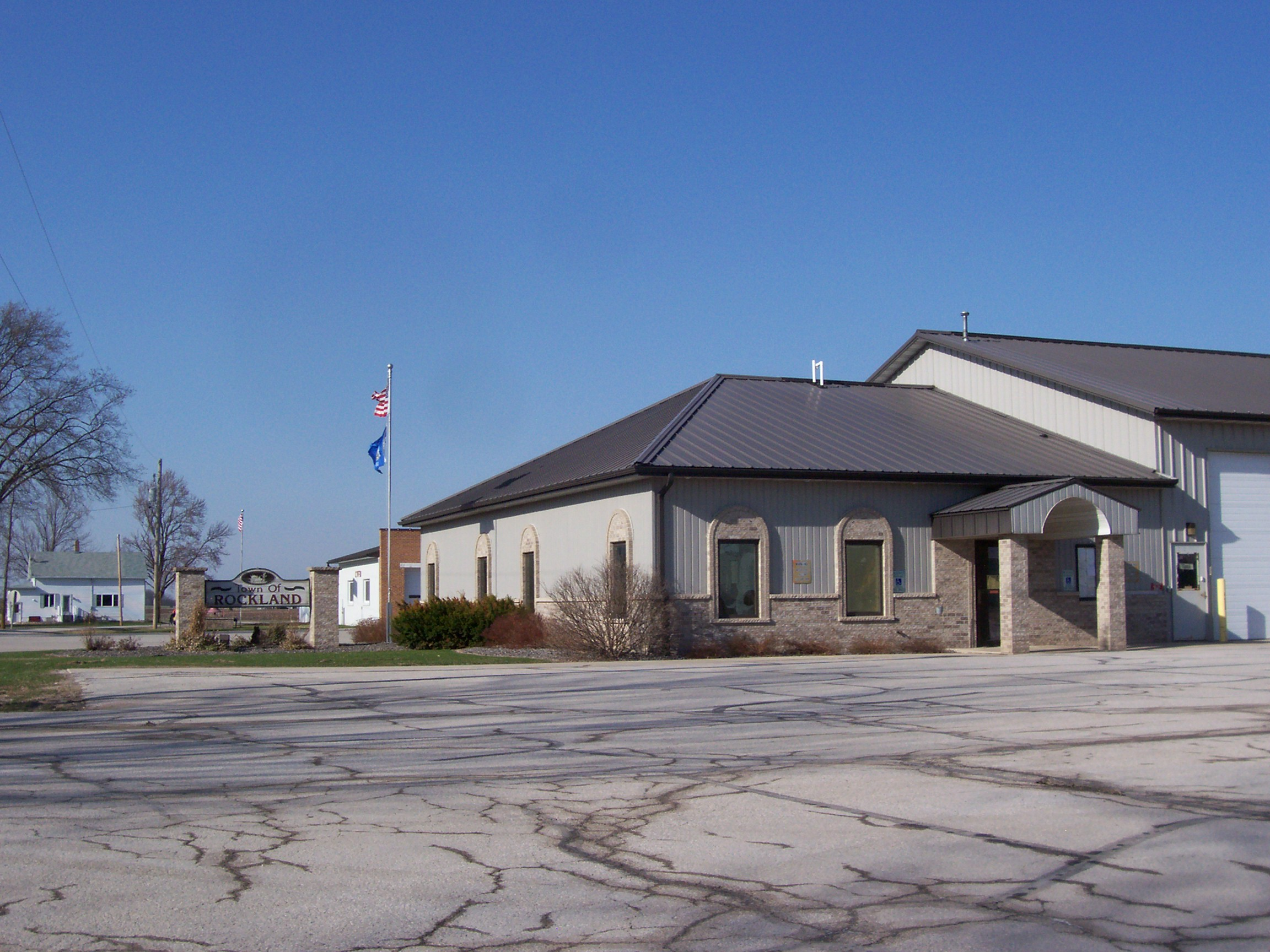
Town of Rockland town hall in Collins
