= Meeme, Wisconsin =

- Town
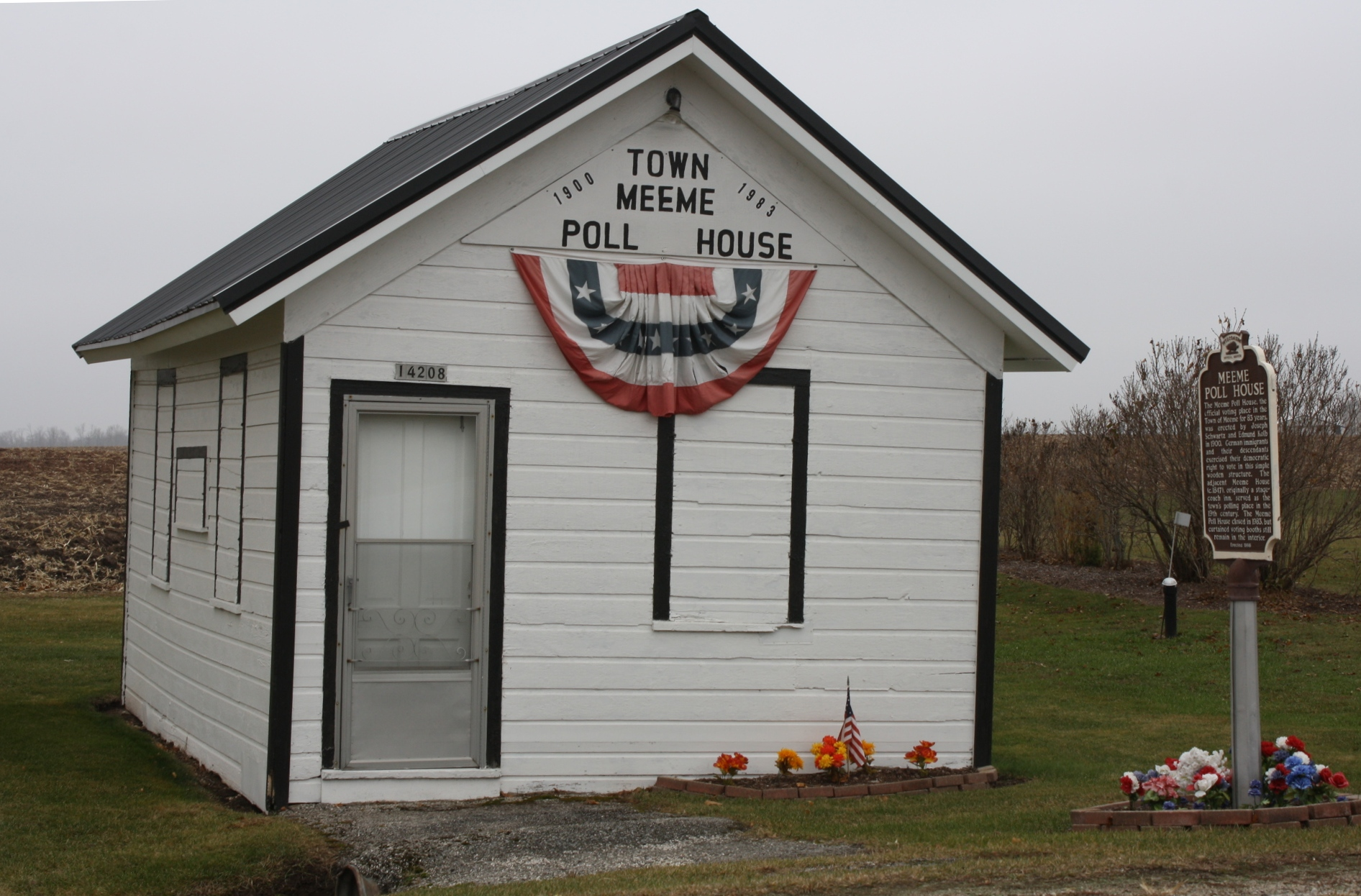

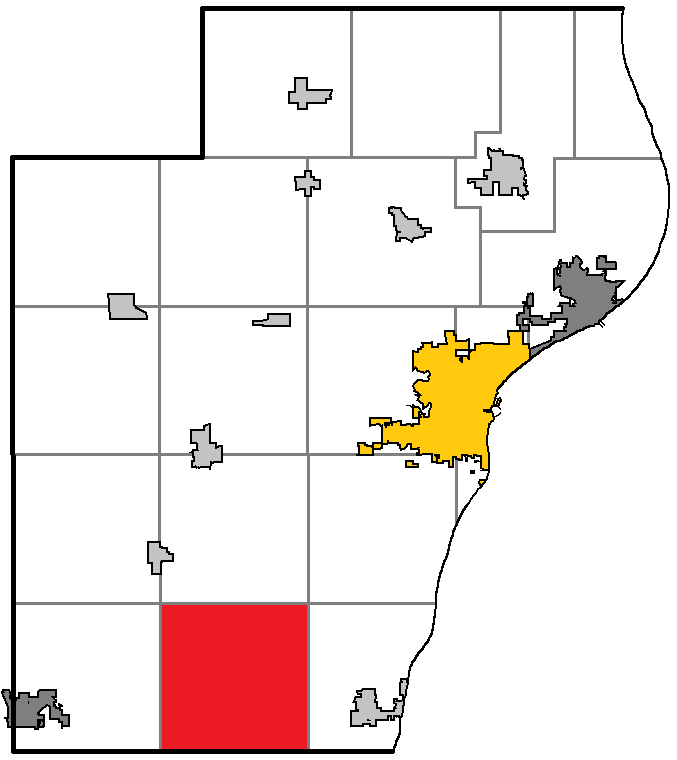
- Location of Meeme, within Manitowoc County
- Coordinates: 43°56′12″N 87°51′14″W
- Country: United States
- State: Wisconsin
- County: Manitowoc

Area
  - Total: 36.3 sq mi (94.0 km^{2})
  - Land: 36.2 sq mi (93.7 km^{2})
  - Water: 0.12 sq mi (0.3 km^{2})
- Elevation: 794 ft (242 m)

Population (2020)
  - Total: 1,440
  - Density: 39.8/sq mi (15.4/km^{2})
- Time zone: UTC-6 (Central (CST))
  - Summer (DST): UTC-5 (CDT)
- Area code: 920
- FIPS code: 55-50625
- GNIS feature ID: 1583686

Meeme is a town in Manitowoc County, Wisconsin, United States. The population was 1,440 at the 2020 census. Its Menominee name is Omīnīw which means "pigeon". The Menominee sold this land to the United States in the 1831 Treaty of Washington. Meeme was one of the four towns into which the county was originally divided on January 9, 1849.

== Communities ==
- Meeme is an unincorporated community located west of Highway XX’s (former WIS 149) southern intersection of WIS 42.
- Osman is an unincorporated community located along WIS 42 south of Highway F.
- School Hill is an unincorporated community located at the intersections of Highways M, X, and Marken Road.
- Spring Valley is an unincorporated community located west of WIS 42. Like Meeme to the south, both were previously served by WIS 42 prior to 1956.

== Geography ==
According to the United States Census Bureau, the town has a total area of 36.3 square miles (94.0 km^{2}), of which, 36.2 square miles (93.7 km^{2}) is land and 0.1 square miles (0.3 km^{2}) (0.28%) is water.

== Demographics ==
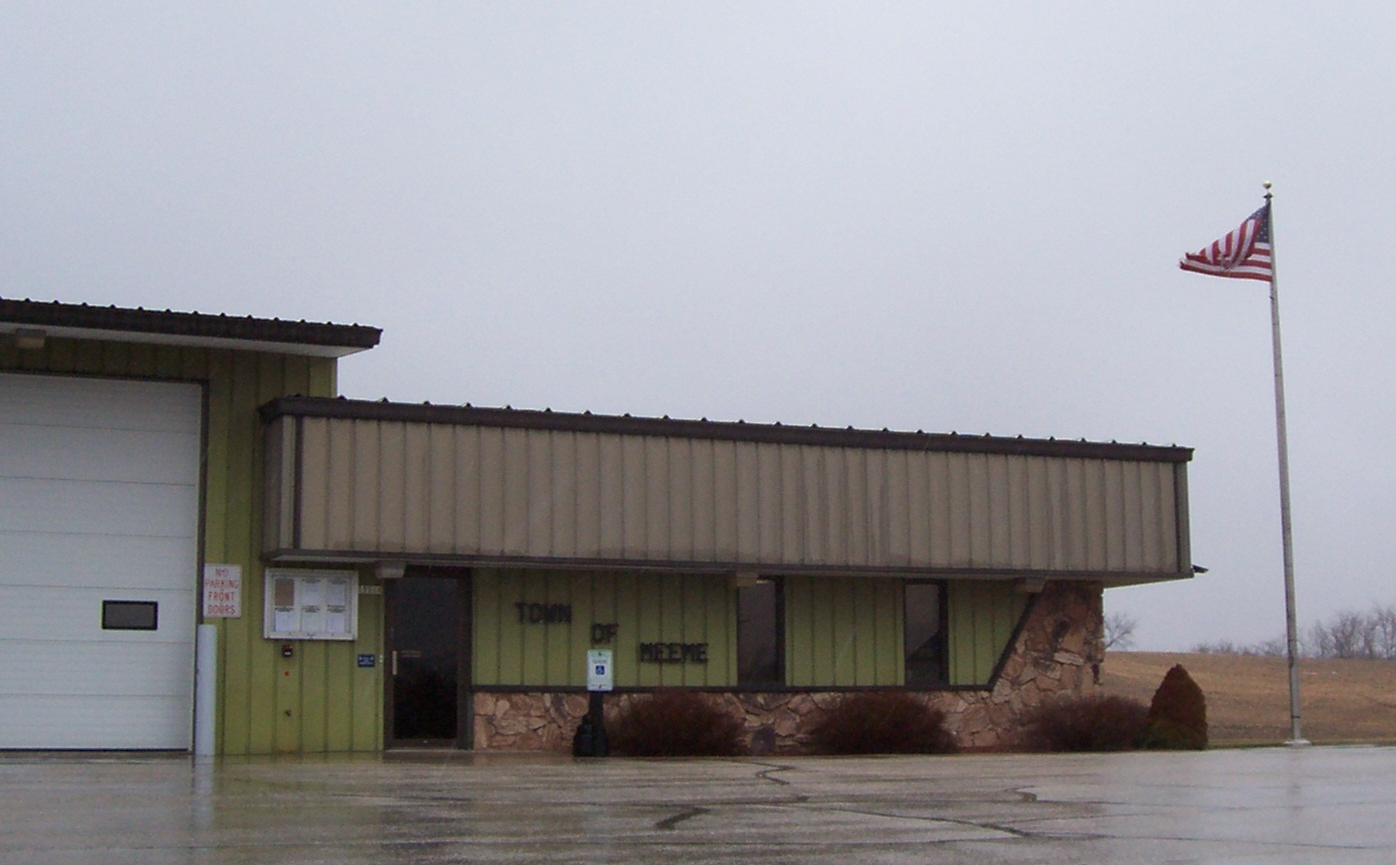
Town hall in School Hill

As of the census of 2020, there were 1,440 people, 531 households, and 432 families residing in the town. The population density was 42.5 people per square mile (16.4/km^{2}). There were 558 housing units at an average density of 15.4 per square mile (6.0/km^{2}). The racial makeup of the town was 98.70% White, 0.07% Native American, 0.33% Asian, 0.72% from other races, and 0.20% from two or more races. Hispanic or Latino people of any race were 1.37% of the population.

There were 531 households, of which 37.9% had children under the age of 18 living with them, 72.3% were married couples living together, 5.6% had a female householder with no husband present, and 18.6% were non-families. 16.2% of all households were made up of individuals, and 7.9% had someone aged 65 or older living alone. The average household size was 2.90 and the average family size was 3.26.

In the town, the population was spread out, with 27.6% under the age of 18, 7.5% from 18 to 24, 28.5% from 25 to 44, 23.1% from 45 to 64, and 13.3% aged 65 or older. The median age was 37 years. For every 100 females, there were 104.5 males. For every 100 females aged 18 and over, there were 104.2 males.

The median income for a household in the town was $55,139, and the median income for a family was $60,000. Males had a median income of $38,984 versus $26,200 for females. The per capita income for the town was $20,927. About 1.2% of families and 3.2% of the population were below the poverty line, including 3.8% of those under age 18 and 1.5% of those age 65 or over.

== Notable people ==
- George Jonathan Danforth, politician
- John Lorfeld, politician
- Herman Roethel, politician
