= John Lorfeld =

American farmer, businessman, and politician

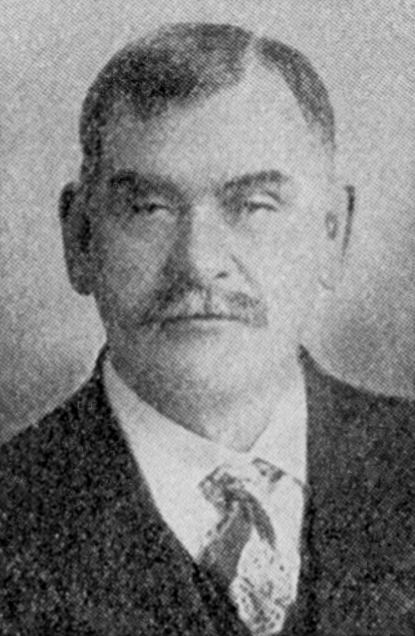

Member of the Wisconsin State Assembly
- In office 1919–1923, 1929–1933

Personal details
- Born: January 25, 1867 Meeme, Wisconsin, US
- Died: November 29, 1954 (aged 87) Cleveland, Wisconsin, US
- Party: Republican
- Occupation: Farmer, businessman, politician

John Lorfeld (January 25, 1867 – November 29, 1954) was a farmer, businessman, and politician.

== Biography ==
Born in the town of Meeme, Manitowoc County, Wisconsin, Lorfeld and his wife moved to a farm in the town of Centerville, in Manitowoc County. Lorfeld as chairman of the Centerville Town Board and on the Manitowoc County Board of Supervisors. He also served as school clerk on the school board. Lorfeld served in the Wisconsin State Assembly from 1919 to 1923 and 1929 to 1933 and was a Republican. Later, he was a leader of the Wisconsin Progressive Party. In 1918, Lorfeld and wife moved to the village of Cleveland, Wisconsin. Lorfeld was president of the Cleveland State Bank. He also was the village postmaster. Lorfeld died at his home in Cleveland, Wisconsin after a long illness.
