= Rantoul, Wisconsin =

- Town
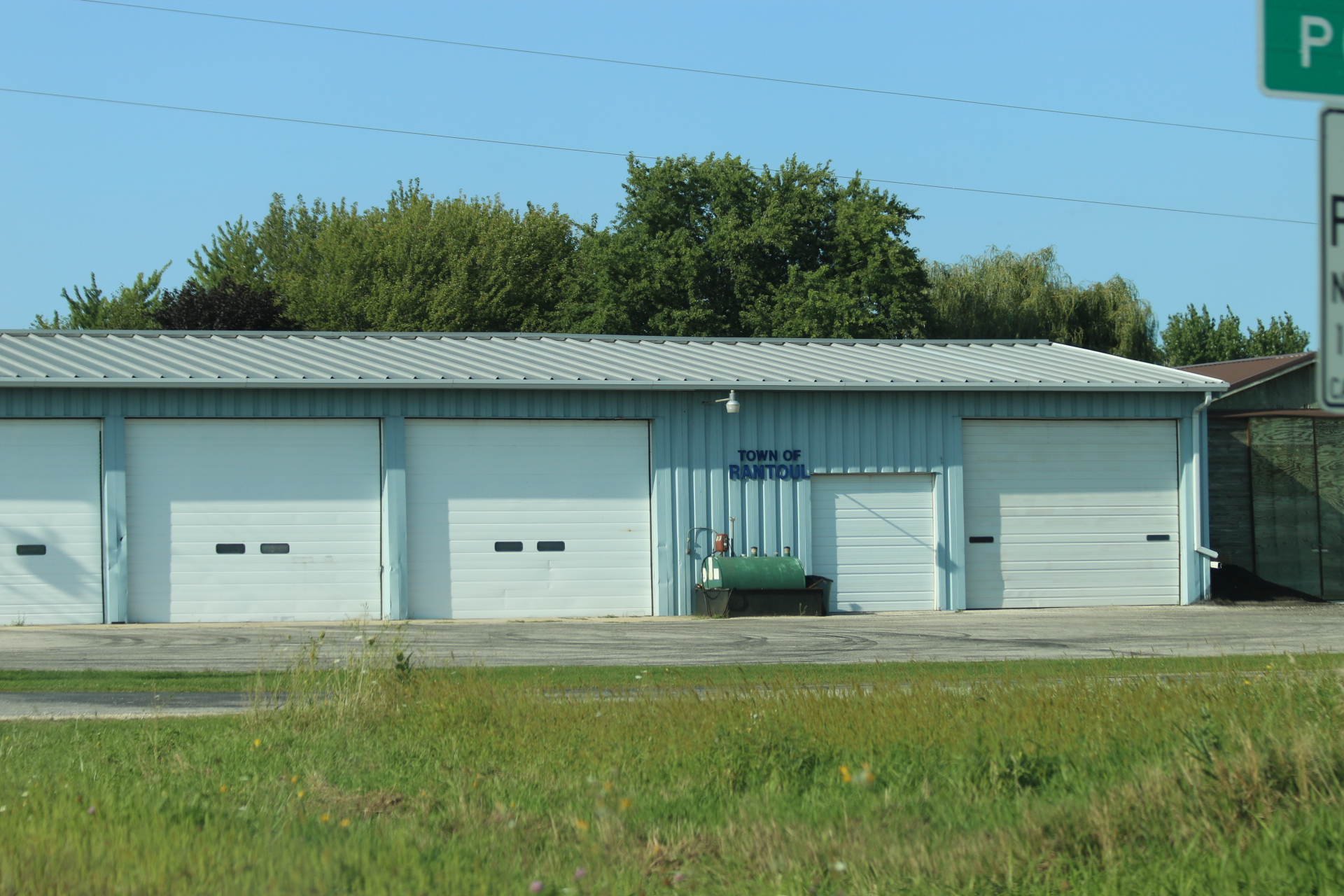
- Town hall

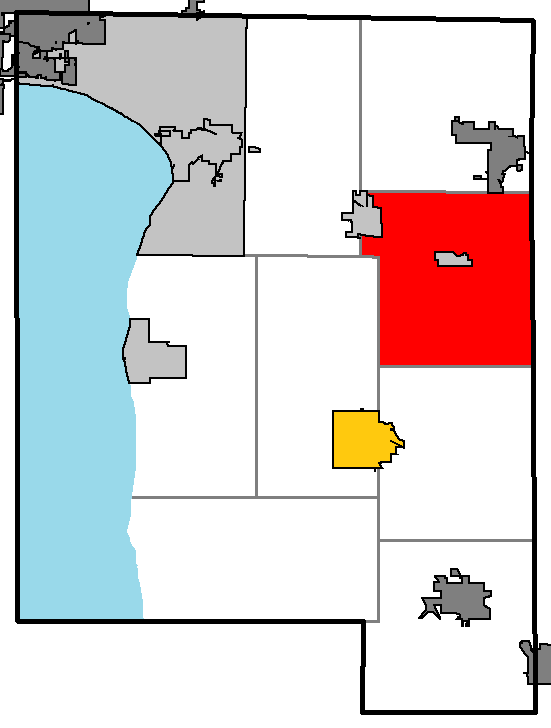
- Location of Rantoul, within Calumet County
- Coordinates: 44°6′23″N 88°5′53″W
- Country: United States
- State: Wisconsin
- County: Calumet

Area
  - Total: 32.4 sq mi (83.8 km^{2})
  - Land: 31.9 sq mi (82.6 km^{2})
  - Water: 0.46 sq mi (1.2 km^{2})
- Elevation: 843 ft (257 m)

Population (2020)
  - Total: 740
  - Density: 23/sq mi (9.0/km^{2})
- Time zone: UTC-6 (Central (CST))
  - Summer (DST): UTC-5 (CDT)
- Area code: 920
- FIPS code: 55-66275
- GNIS feature ID: 1583998
- Website: www.townofrantoul.com

Rantoul is a town in Calumet County in the U.S. state of Wisconsin. The population was 740 at the 2020 census, down from 798 at the 2010 census. The unincorporated community of Wells is located partially in the town.

== Geography ==
The Town of Rantoul is located in northeastern Calumet County. It is bordered by Manitowoc County to the east. The village of Potter is in the center of the town but is a separate municipality, and the village of Hilbert touches the town's northwestern border. According to the United States Census Bureau, the town has a total area of 32.4 square miles (83.8 km^{2}), of which 31.9 square miles (82.6 km^{2}) is land and 0.46 square miles (1.2 km^{2}), or 1.40%, is water.

== Demographics ==
As of the census of 2000, there were 841 people, 261 households, and 222 families residing in the town. The population density was 25.9 people per square mile (10.0/km^{2}). There were 267 housing units at an average density of 8.2 per square mile (3.2/km^{2}). The racial makeup of the town was 96.79% White, 0.83% Native American, 0.83% Asian, and 1.55% from two or more races. Hispanic or Latino of any race were 0.12% of the population.

There were 261 households, out of which 45.6% had children under the age of 18 living with them, 74.3% were married couples living together, 6.1% had a female householder with no husband present, and 14.9% were non-families. 10.3% of all households were made up of individuals, and 3.8% had someone living alone who was 65 years of age or older. The average household size was 3.22 and the average family size was 3.49.

In the town, the population was spread out, with 33.8% under the age of 18, 6.5% from 18 to 24, 31.5% from 25 to 44, 20.0% from 45 to 64, and 8.2% who were 65 years of age or older. The median age was 34 years. For every 100 females, there were 104.1 males. For every 100 females age 18 and over, there were 107.1 males.

The median income for a household in the town was $48,000, and the median income for a family was $50,893. Males had a median income of $35,917 versus $23,214 for females. The per capita income for the town was $18,316. About 2.9% of families and 3.1% of the population were below the poverty line, including 4.0% of those under age 18 and none of those age 65 or over.

== Notable people ==
- Herman Hedrich, politician
- Gervase Hephner, politician
- Carl Hillmann, politician
- Henry Kleist, politician
