= School Hill, Wisconsin =

- Unincorporated community
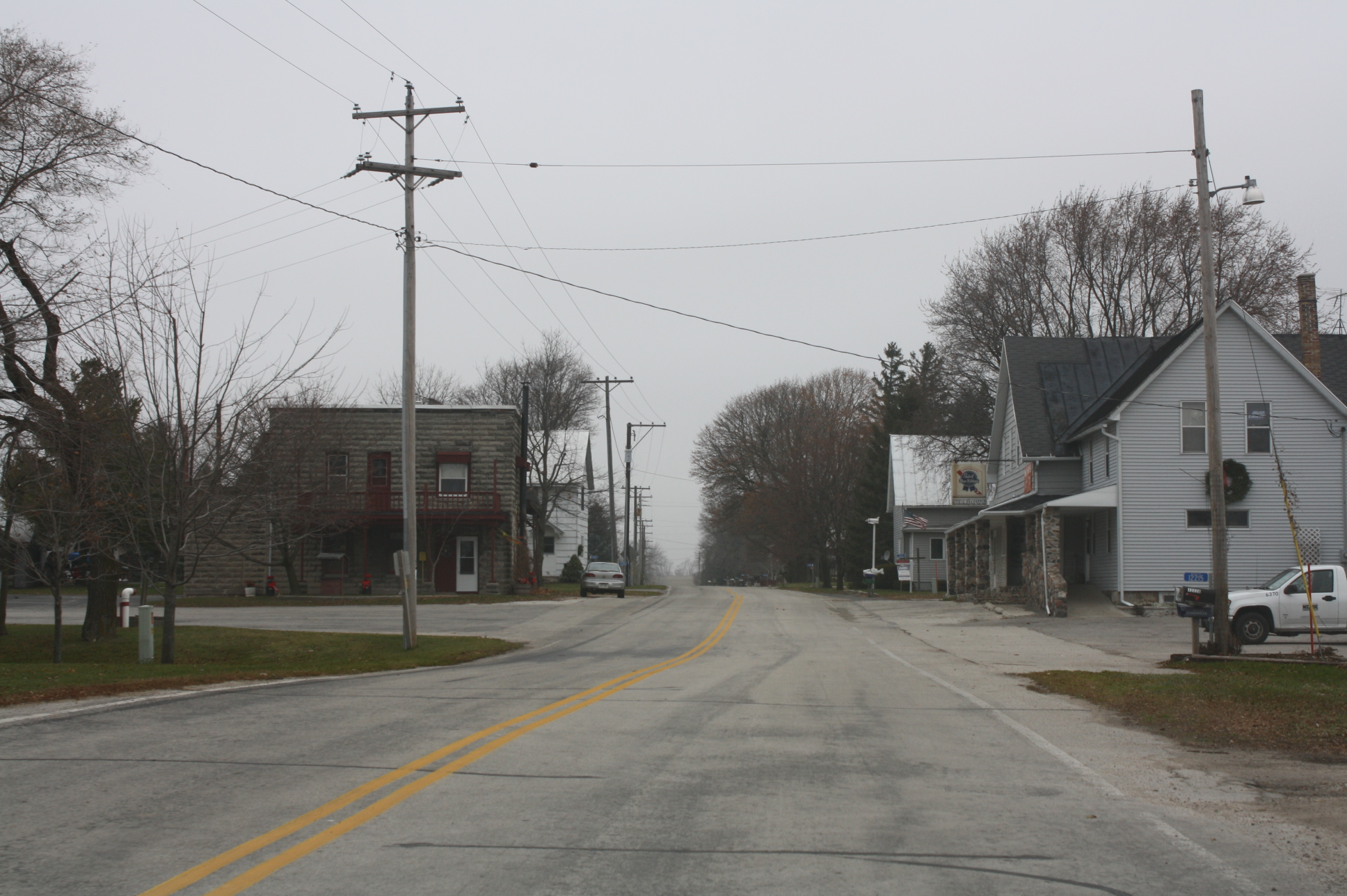
- Looking north on Marken Road at School Hill

- Location within Wisconsin Location within the United States
- Coordinates: 43°57′00″N 87°53′38″W
- Country: United States
- State: Wisconsin
- County: Manitowoc
- Elevation: 922 ft (281 m)
- Time zone: UTC-6 (Central (CST))
  - Summer (DST): UTC-5 (CDT)
- Area code: 920
- GNIS feature ID: 1573801

School Hill is an unincorporated community in the town of Meeme located in Manitowoc County, Wisconsin, United States. School Hill is located in southern Manitowoc County, along County "X" at its intersections with Marken Road and County "M".

== Geography ==
School Hill is located at 43°56′58″N 87°53′34″W (43.949444, -87.892778).

== Images ==
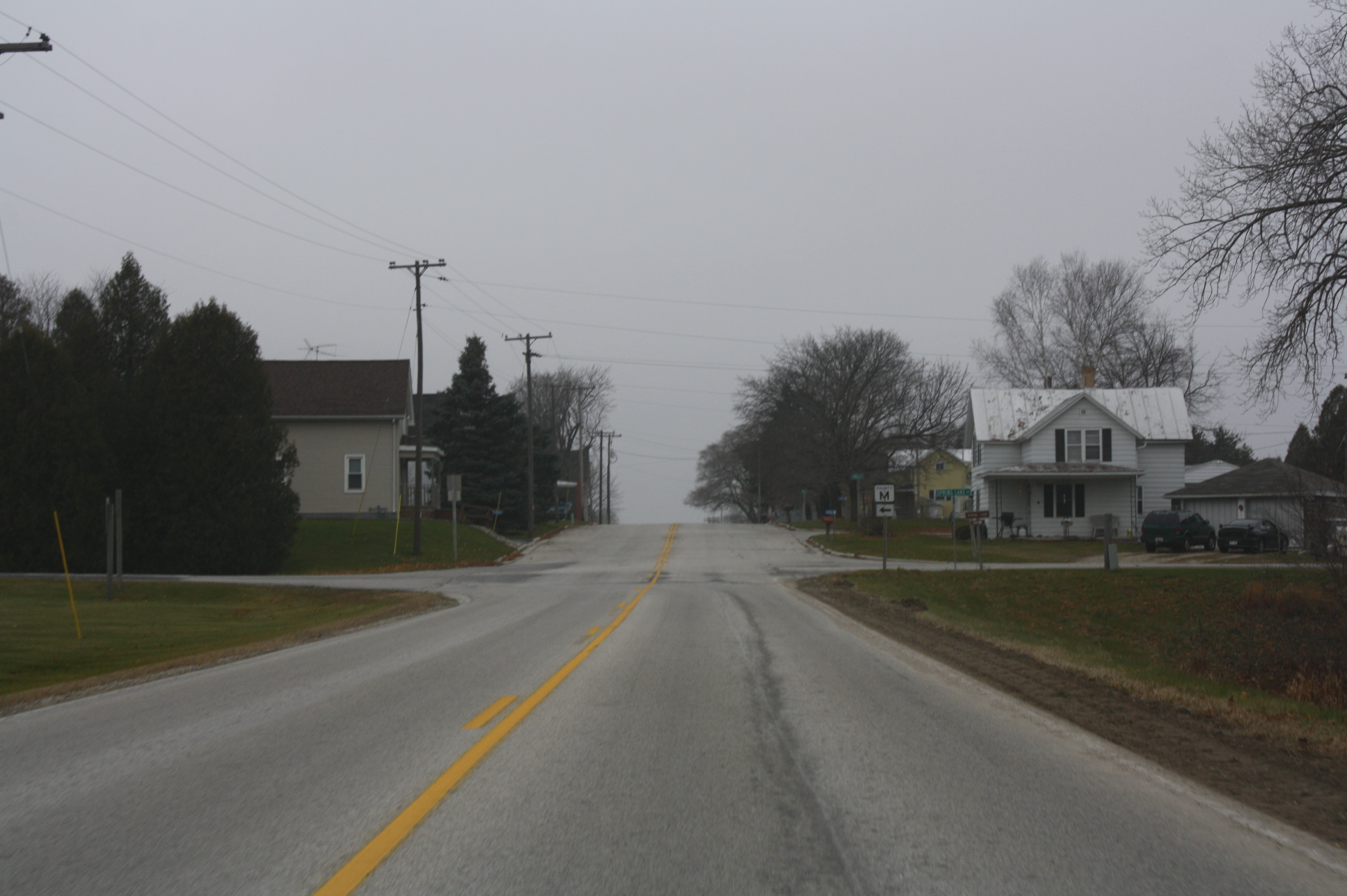
Looking west at School Hill

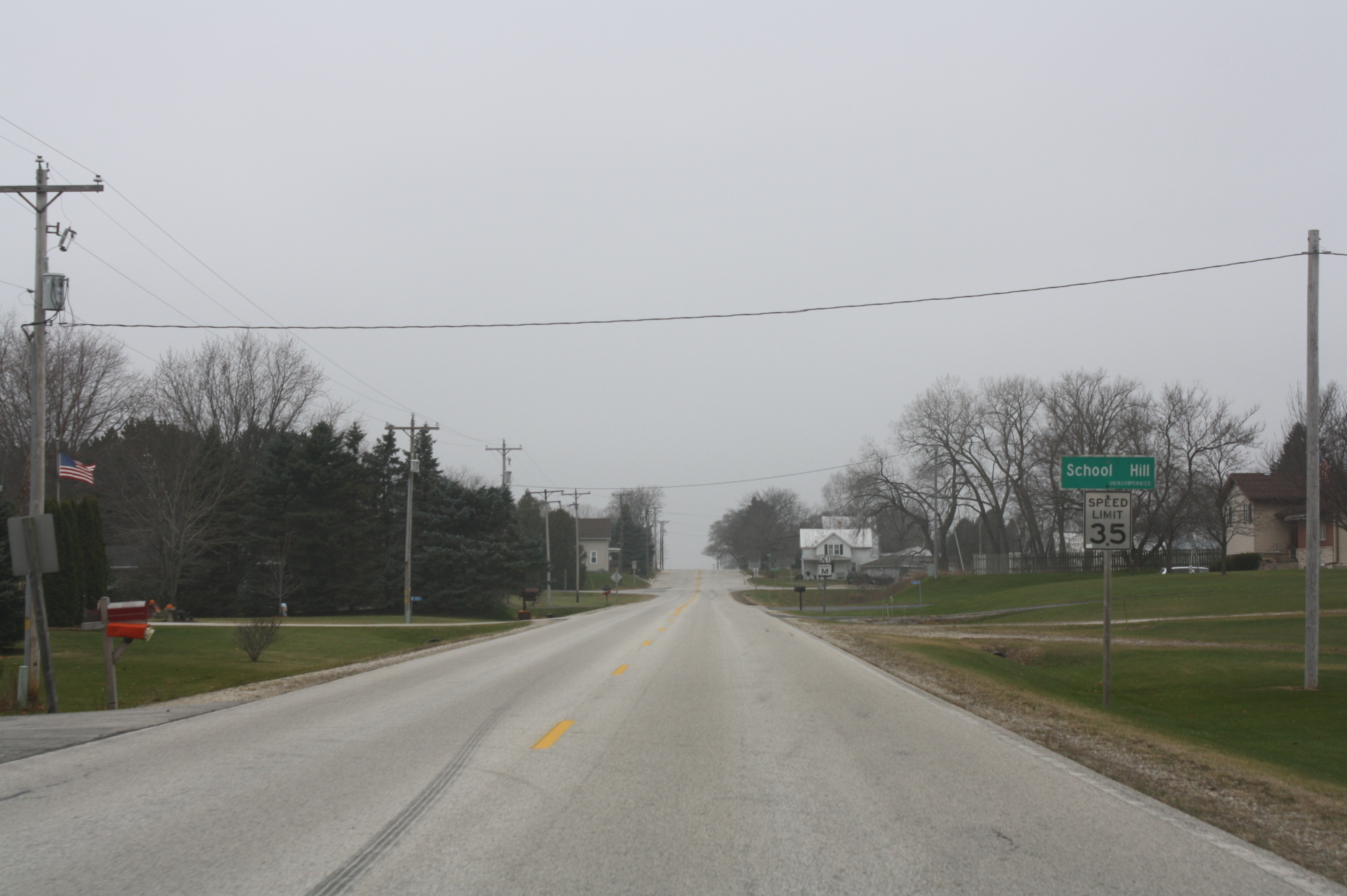
Looking west at the sign for School Hill
