= Wells, Manitowoc County, Wisconsin =

Wells, Wisconsin
- Unincorporated community
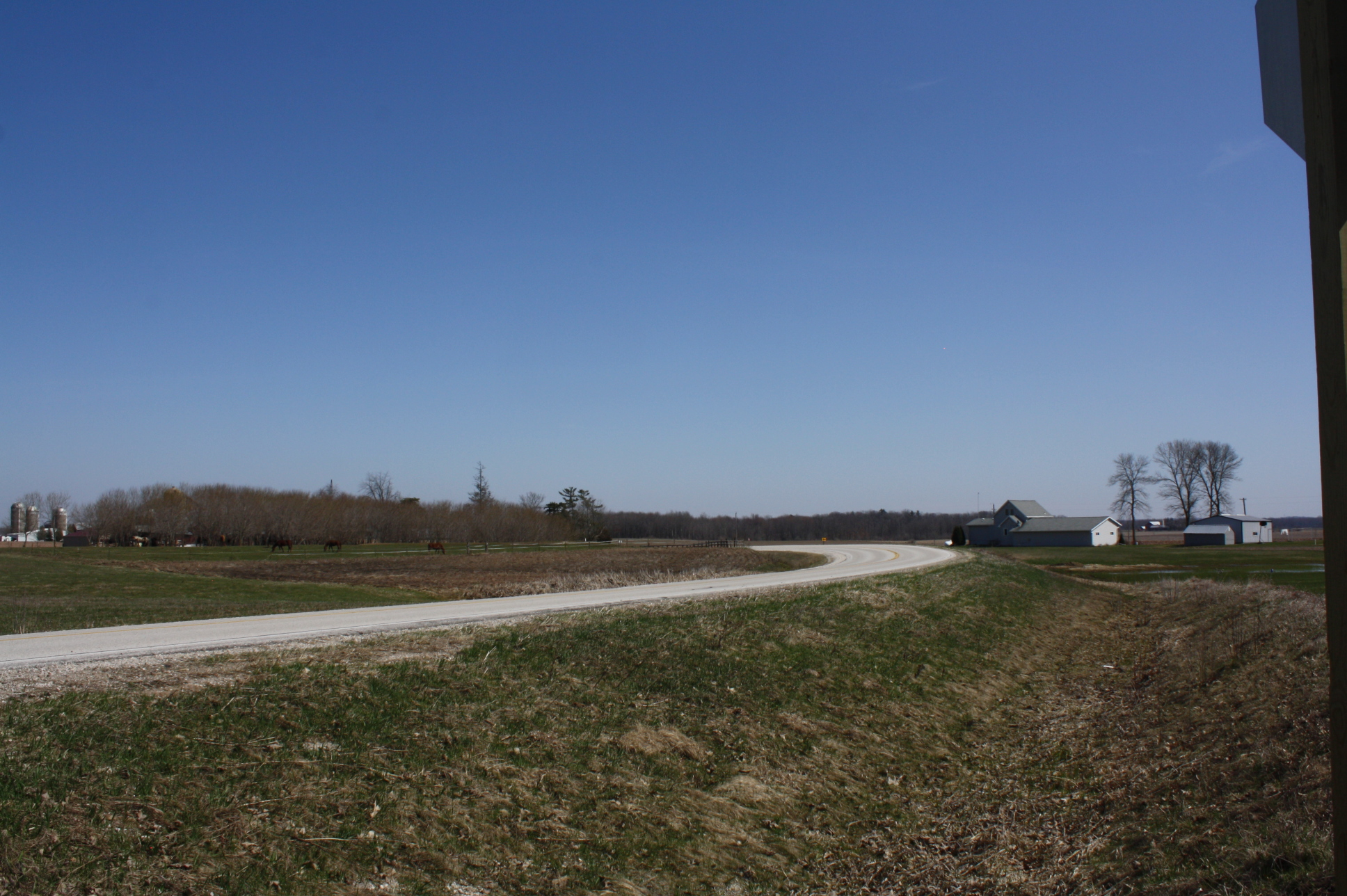
- Looking southeast at Wells

- Location within Wisconsin Location within the United States
- Coordinates: 44°05′44″N 88°02′36″W
- Country: United States
- State: Wisconsin
- Counties: Calumet, Manitowoc
- Town: Rantoul, Rockland
- Founded: 1880s
- Elevation: 840 ft (260 m)
- Time zone: UTC-6 (Central (CST))
  - Summer (DST): UTC-5 (CDT)
- Area code: 920
- GNIS feature ID: 1577874

Wells is an unincorporated community in the town of Rantoul, Calumet County and the town of Rockland, Manitowoc County, Wisconsin, United States.

== History ==
Wells was founded in the 1880s. The first store owner, Claus Meinke, became the postmaster for the community's post office in 1894.

== Images ==
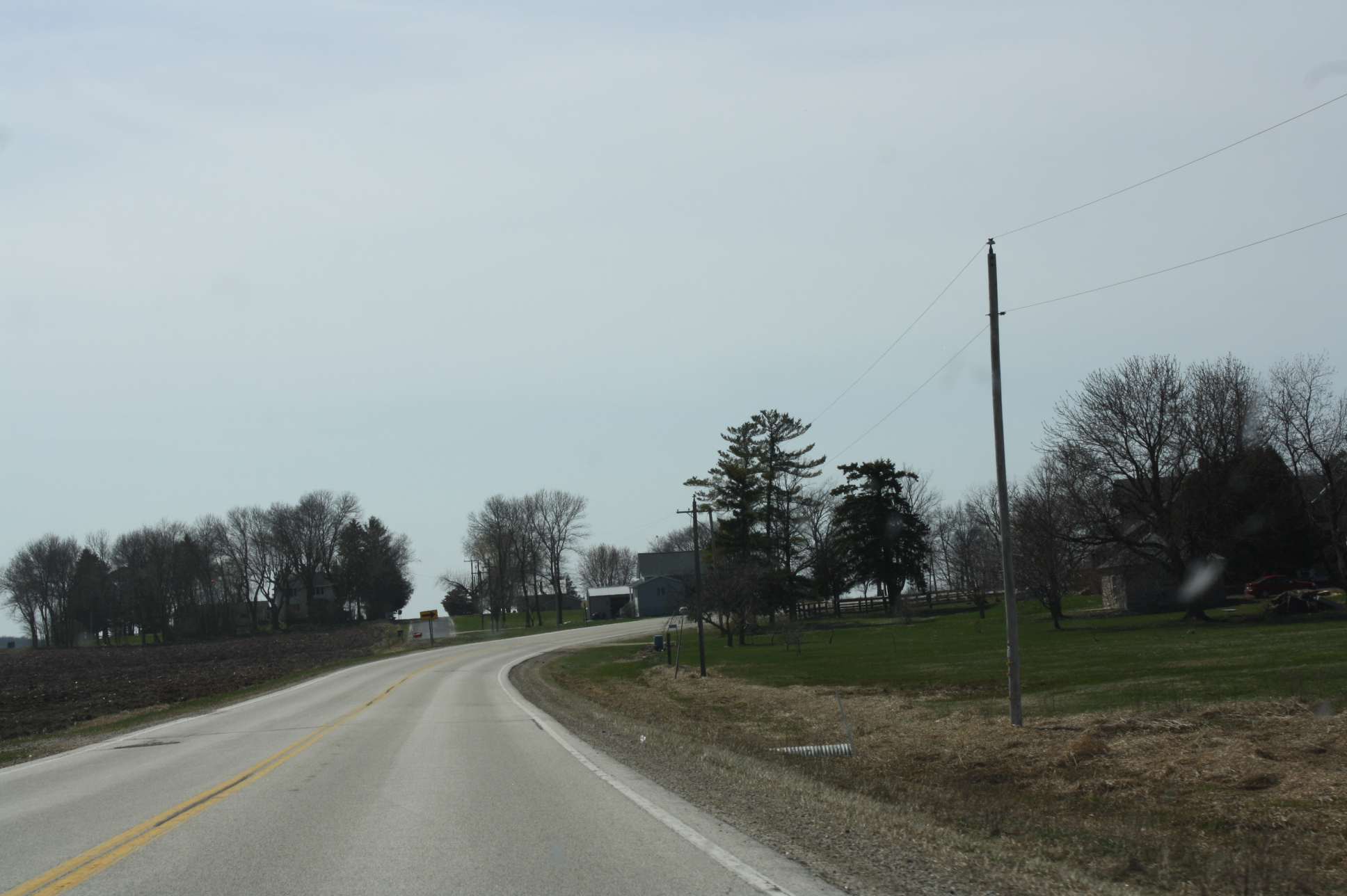
Looking west at Wells

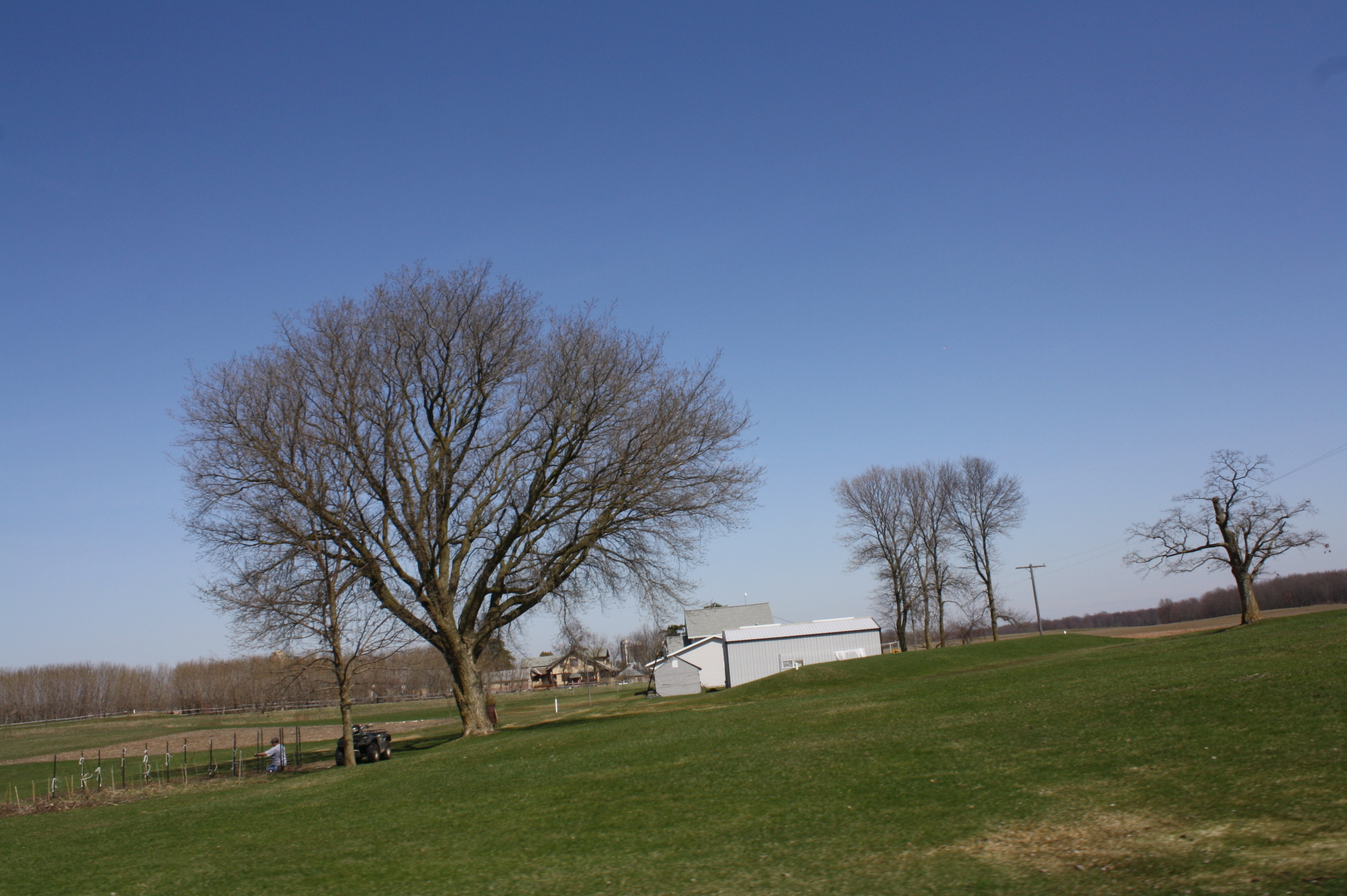
Looking east at Wells
