= Dead Mount Death Play =

Japanese manga series and its adaptations

- First tankōbon volume cover

デッドマウント・デスプレイ (Deddomaunto Desupurei)
- Genre: Action; Dark fantasy; Reverse isekai
- Manga
- Written by: Ryohgo Narita
- Illustrated by: Shinta Fujimoto
- Published by: Square Enix
- English publisher: NA: Yen Press
- Magazine: Young Gangan
- Original run: October 20, 2017 – present
- Volumes: 17
- Anime television series
- Directed by: Manabu Ono (#1–12); Yoshihiro Satsuma (#13–24)
- Written by: Manabu Ono; Yukie Sugawara; Yoriko Tomita
- Music by: F.M.F
- Studio: Geek Toys
- Licensed by: Crunchyroll (streaming); SA/SEA: Medialink
- Original network: Tokyo MX, BS11, SUN, KBS Kyoto, AT-X, HTB
- Original run: April 11, 2023 – December 26, 2023
- Episodes: 24
- Serial novel

Gaiden: Kaijin Solitaire no Shinsen Kijutsu
- Written by: Ryohgo Narita
- Illustrated by: Shinta Fujimoto
- Published by: Square Enix
- Imprint: Young Gangan Comics
- Magazine: Manga Up!
- Original run: May 2023 – present
- Volumes: 3
- Manga

Side Story: Phantom Solitaire's Art of Disguising Oneself as a Supernatural Being
- Written by: Ryohgo Narita; Ume Matsutake (composition)
- Illustrated by: Yata Sugami
- Published by: Square Enix
- English publisher: NA: Square Enix
- Magazine: Manga Up!; Young Gangan
- Original run: November 25, 2023 – present
- Volumes: 5
- icon

Dead Mount Death Play (Japanese: デッドマウント・デスプレイ, Hepburn: Deddomaunto Desupurei) is a Japanese manga series written by Ryohgo Narita and illustrated by Shinta Fujimoto. It began serialization in Square Enix's Young Gangan in October 2017. An anime television series adaptation produced by Geek Toys aired in two cours, with the first cour airing from April to June 2023 and the second cour airing from October to December 2023.

== Plot ==
In another world, a hero named Sir Shagrua Edith Lugrid is about to finish off a powerful necromancer known as the Corpse God. However, the Corpse God uses a unique magic skill to reincarnate himself into another world, and ends up in modern-day Shinjuku, in the body of a boy named Polka Shinoyama who just had his throat slit by an assassin. Thinking that this new world could provide the peaceful life he desired in the previous one, the Corpse God takes on Polka's identity and soon integrates himself in the Shinjuku underworld with assistance from a woman named Clarissa and her subordinates.

== Characters ==
Polka Shinoyama (四乃山 ポルカ, Shinoyama Poruka)
Voiced by: Yuki Sakakihara (Japanese); Morgan Berry (English)
A 16 year old boy who was murdered by a hit man who turned out to be Misaki. His body now hosts an otherworldly necromancer known as the Corpse God, who seeks the peaceful life he was denied in his previous world. Though there are fewer sources of magic in this world, the Corpse God can use Polka's body to summon skeletons of varying size, speak with dead spirits, and revive a corpse as a zombie with enough preparation. The original Polka's soul is transferred into one of Takumi's aerial drones, and then a shark plushie later on.
Misaki Sakimiya (崎宮 ミサキ, Sakimiya Misaki)
Voiced by: Inori Minase (Japanese); Bree Han (English)
A 17 year old assassin with an eccentric personality who watched her family die when she was younger. After living in an orphanage, she became a hit man in her teenaged years to take revenge on the killer and those like him, finding joy in her brutal work. After completing the hit on Polka, she planned to kill herself, as she felt that it was the only type of kill that she hadn't experienced yet. However, when the Corpse God kills her through Polka's body, then revives her as a zombie, she becomes infatuated with him, and Clarissa assigns Misaki to watch him. Her zombified body allows her to heal any wound and temporarily paralyze people with her saliva and teeth.
Takumi Kuruya (繰屋 匠, Kuruya Takumi)
Voiced by: Yuma Uchida (Japanese); Brandon Acosta (English)
A tech contractor who works for Clarissa and is later assigned to keep tabs on the revived Polka. With his server farm, visor, and drones, he has a surveillance network that covers a large swath of Shinjuku.
Tsubaki Iwanome (岩野目 ツバキ, Iwanome Tsubaki)
Voiced by: Takuya Eguchi (Japanese); Jason Douglas (English)
Gōzaburō Arase (荒瀬 耿三郎, Arase Gōzaburō)
Voiced by: Nobuhiko Okamoto (Japanese); Derick Snow (English)
Lisa Kuraki (倉木 リサ, Kuraki Risa)
Voiced by: Atsumi Tanezaki
Lisa Kuraki, also known as Clarissa (クラリッサ), is a mediator and bartender who runs Youtoukorou: a legal bar-cum-illegal freelance agency that operates in Shinjuku.
Koyū Azuma (雷 小幽, Azuma Koyū)
Voiced by: Misato Fukuen
Rozan Shinoyama (四乃山 呂算, Shinoyama Rozan)
Voiced by: Kazuhiro Yamaji
Saya Shinoyama (四乃山 小夜, Shinoyama Saya)
Voiced by: Yō Taichi
Izuna Ajishiro (阿字城 イズナ, Ajishiro Izuna)
Voiced by: Rumi Okubo
Furuto Ichinose (一ノ瀬 古瑠斗, Ichinose Furuto)
Voiced by: Ikumi Hasegawa
Saki Aikawa (合川 咲姫, Aikawa Saki)
Voiced by: Haruka Shiraishi
Kuon Higuro (氷黒久遠, Higuro Kuon)
Voiced by: Yoshimasa Hosoya
Arius Sabaramond (アリウス・サバラモンド, Ariusu Sabaramondo)
Voiced by: Ayumu Murase
Taigai (太貝)
Voiced by: Hiroya Egashira
Yomogi (蓬)
Voiced by: Serika Hiromatsu

== Media ==
=== Manga ===
Written by Ryohgo Narita and illustrated by Shinta Fujimoto, the series began serialization in Square Enix's Young Gangan magazine on October 20, 2017. As of April 2026, the series' individual chapters have been collected in 17 tankōbon volumes.

Yen Press is publishing the series in English and is releasing chapters simultaneously with their Japanese release.

A manga adaptation of the spin-off novel Dead Mount Death Play Side Story: Phantom Solitaire's Art of Disguising Oneself as a Supernatural Being (デッドマウント・デスプレイ外伝 怪人ソリティアの神仙偽術, Deddomaunto Desupurei Gaiden: Kaijin Soritia no Shinsen Kijutsu) composed by Ume Matsutake and illustrated by Yata Sugami began serialization on Manga Up! on November 25, 2023. The spin-off ended its first part on April 4, 2026. As of April 2026, the spin-off's individual chapters have been collected in 5 tankōbon volumes. The spin-off is published in English on Square Enix's Manga Up! Global website and app.

==== Volumes ====
No.	Original release date	Original ISBN	English release date	English ISBN
1	April 25, 2018	978-4-7575-5700-0	December 11, 2018	978-1-9753-2925-9
2	November 24, 2018	978-4-7575-5922-6	June 18, 2019	978-1-9753-5761-0
3	April 25, 2019	978-4-7575-6103-8	December 24, 2019	978-1-9753-8742-6
4	November 25, 2019	978-4-7575-6401-5	June 23, 2020	978-1-9753-1373-9
5	April 25, 2020	978-4-7575-6623-1	June 15, 2021	978-1-9753-2444-5
6	November 25, 2020	978-4-7575-6960-7	August 31, 2021	978-1-9753-3585-4
7	April 24, 2021	978-4-7575-7214-0	April 26, 2022	978-1-9753-4064-3
8	November 25, 2021	978-4-7575-7595-0	September 20, 2022	978-1-9753-4958-5
9	April 25, 2022	978-4-7575-7891-3	July 18, 2023	978-1-9753-7155-5
10	November 25, 2022	978-4-7575-8269-9	October 17, 2023	978-1-9753-7537-9
11	April 25, 2023	978-4-7575-8496-9	January 23, 2024	978-1-9753-8977-2
12	November 25, 2023	978-4-7575-8880-6; 978-4-7575-8881-3 (SE)	September 17, 2024	979-8-8554-0209-4
13	April 25, 2024	978-4-7575-9158-5	February 18, 2025	979-8-8554-1139-3
14	November 25, 2024	978-4-7575-9530-9	November 4, 2025	979-8-8554-2057-9
15	April 24, 2025	978-4-7575-9819-5	June 23, 2026	979-8-8554-3539-9
16	November 25, 2025	978-4-301-00187-4	February 23, 2027	979-8-8554-4842-9
17	April 24, 2026	978-4-301-00475-2	—	—
18	November 25, 2026	978-4-301-00899-6	—	—

==== Side Story: Phantom Solitaire's Art of Disguising Oneself as a Supernatural Being ====
No.	Original release date	Original ISBN	English release date	English ISBN
1	April 25, 2024	978-4-7575-9159-2	July 22, 2025	979-8-8554-1845-3
2	November 25, 2024	978-4-7575-9531-6	January 20, 2026	979-8-8554-2055-5
3	April 24, 2025	978-4-7575-9820-1	September 22, 2026	979-8-8554-3542-9
4	November 25, 2025	978-4-301-00188-1	March 23, 2027	979-8-8554-4840-5
5	April 24, 2026	978-4-301-00487-5	—	—

=== Anime ===
An anime television series adaptation was announced on November 15, 2022. It is produced by Geek Toys and directed by Manabu Ono (with Yoshihiro Satsuma replacing Ono as the director for the second cour), with assistant direction by Takaharu Ōkuma, sub-direction by Yoshiki Kitai, scripts written by Ono, Yukie Sugawara, and Yoriko Tomita, character designs handled by Hisashi Abe, and music composed by F.M.F, a group composed of Yūki Nara, Eba, and Kana Utatane.

The series aired for two cours, with the first cour aired from April 11 to June 27, 2023, (Note: The series premiered on April 10, 2023, at 24:00 (effectively, April 11 at 12:00 a.m. JST).) and the second cour aired from October 10 to December 26 of the same year, on Tokyo MX and other networks. The first cour's opening theme song is "Nero" (ネロ) by Hiiragi Kirai (sung by Sou), while the ending theme song is "Aolite" (アイオライト) by Inori Minase. The second cour's opening theme song is "Scrap Art" (スクラップアート, Sukurappu Āto) by Inori Minase, while the ending theme song is "Hope" by Yuma Uchida.

At Anime NYC 2022, Crunchyroll announced that they would be streaming the series. Medialink has licensed this title in Asia-Pacific (except Australia and New Zealand) and it was streamed on Ani-One Asia YouTube channel.

==== Episodes ====
No.	Title	Directed by (Note: Information is taken from the ending credits of each episode.)	Written by	Storyboarded by	Original release date
Part 1
1	"The Reincarnation"; Transliteration: "The Reincarnation －Tensei－" (Japanese: The Reincarnation －転生－)	Yoshiki Kitai	Manabu Ono	Manabu Ono	April 11, 2023
Shagrua Lugrid, the "Calamity Crusher," leads a band of heroes into the lair of the evil necromancer known as the Corpse God for a final showdown to bring peace to the land. However, just as Shagrua lands the final blow, the Corpse God casts a strange new magic spell. Suddenly, the scene shifts to modern-day Shinjuku, in Tokyo, Japan. A white-haired boy with a cut throat wakes up in an alleyway and stumbles out onto the street, where he slowly regains his memories of the name Polka Shinoyama, and is tracked down by an eccentric woman with a crowbar named Misaki Sakimiya, who killed him before and tries to do so again. Despite not being used to his current body, Polka ends up stumbling into a room where he's able to use magic to summon a giant bony hand and kill Misaki. The scene then switches back to the other world, where it turns out the Corpse God is the one possessing Polka, while Shagrua suspects that the Corpse God is not fully gone even after he destroyed his vessel.
2	"The New World"; Transliteration: "The New World －Isekai－" (Japanese: The New World －異世界－)	Daisuke Kurose	Manabu Ono	Takaharu Ōkuma	April 18, 2023
The Corpse God reflects on his past life as a necromancer in the other world and the Empire that used him. In the present, Polka is shocked to discover that his actions really killed Misaki, as there are no mages or recovery potions in this world. Meanwhile, Takumi feeds his drone camera data to his client, Lisa Kuraki, who struggles to comprehend how Polka is still alive and using supernatural powers. While dead, Misaki sees images of her life flashing before her eyes, including seeing her family murdered by a hit man, and later becoming a "killer of killers" herself to get revenge as well as to see if the act itself was fun. After taking revenge on the man who killed her family, she decides to take on the job of killing a seemingly innocent boy named Polka to prove that she could do so, and easily did. Misaki then planned to jump off a roof with nothing left, until Takumi told her that Polka wasn't dead, leading her to try to finish the job. Polka brings Misaki back as a type of zombie, but before she wakes up, overhears Lisa mention an unlicensed nursery that caught on fire. Polka decides to save the children trapped there himself, using magic to quickly get in and out of the building with the children while images of large skeleton hands hit social media. Still trying to find his place in this world, Polka decides to work under Lisa after Misaki wakes up.
3	"The Necromancer"; Transliteration: "The Necromancer －Shiryōjutsushi－" (Japanese: The Necromancer －死霊術士－)	Kenichi Yatagai	Yoriko Tomita	Kenichi Yatagai	April 25, 2023
4	"The Mad Dog"; Transliteration: "The Mad Dog －Kyōken－" (Japanese: The Mad Dog －狂犬－)	Yūichi Nakazawa	Yoriko Tomita	Yoshiki Kitai	May 2, 2023
5	"The Monster"; Transliteration: "The Monster －Kaibutsu－" (Japanese: The Monster －怪物－)	Tarō Yamada	Manabu Ono	Tarō Yamada	May 9, 2023
6	"The Firestarter"; Transliteration: "The Firestarter －Hifukimushi－" (Japanese: The Firestarter －火吹き蟲－)	Tomio Yamauchi	Yukie Sugawara	Yoshiki Kitai	May 16, 2023
7	"The Magician"; Transliteration: "The Magician －Kijutsushi－" (Japanese: The Magician －奇術師－)	Masatoyo Takada	Manabu Ono	Masatoyo Takada	May 23, 2023
8	"The Assassin"; Transliteration: "The Assassin －Ansatsusha－" (Japanese: The Assassin －暗殺者－)	Kim Hee-gang, Fumio Maezono	Yoriko Tomita	Michio Fukuda	May 30, 2023
9	"The Signpost"; Transliteration: "The Signpost －Dōhyō－" (Japanese: The Signpost －道標－)	Yūji Kanzaki	Yukie Sugawara	Yasuhiro Geshi, Shinpei Nagai	June 6, 2023
10	"The Emblem"; Transliteration: "The Emblem －Kuni Akira－" (Japanese: The Emblem －国章－)	Naoki Murata	Yoriko Tomita	Shinpei Nagai	June 13, 2023
11	"The Beginning"; Transliteration: "The Beginning －Shidō－" (Japanese: The Beginning －始動－)	Unknown	Unknown	TBA	June 20, 2023
12	"The Sacred Place"; Transliteration: "The Sacred Place －Shinden－" (Japanese: The Sacred Place －神殿－)	Unknown	Unknown	TBA	June 27, 2023
Part 2
13	"The Invaders"; Transliteration: "The Invaders －Shin'nyūsha－" (Japanese: The Invaders －侵入者－)	Unknown	Unknown	TBA	October 10, 2023
14	"The Corpse"; Transliteration: "The Corpse －Shitai－" (Japanese: The Corpse －死体－)	Unknown	Unknown	TBA	October 17, 2023
15	"The Vampire"; Transliteration: "The Vampire －Kyūketsuki－" (Japanese: The Vampire －吸血鬼－)	Unknown	Unknown	TBA	October 24, 2023
16	"The Fake"; Transliteration: "The Fake －Kyogi－" (Japanese: The Fake －虚偽－)	Unknown	Unknown	TBA	October 31, 2023
17	"The Matriarch"; Transliteration: "The Matriarch －Ienaga－" (Japanese: The Matriarch －家長－)	Unknown	Unknown	TBA	November 7, 2023
18	"The Revenge"; Transliteration: "The Revenge －Fukushū－" (Japanese: The Revenge －復讐－)	Unknown	Unknown	TBA	November 14, 2023
19	"The Friends"; Transliteration: "The Friends －Shin'yū－" (Japanese: The Friends －親友－)	Unknown	Unknown	TBA	November 21, 2023
20	"The Visitors"; Transliteration: "The Visitors －Raihōsha－" (Japanese: The Visitors －来訪者－)	Unknown	Unknown	TBA	November 28, 2023
21	"The Spirit"; Transliteration: "The Spirit －Seirei－" (Japanese: The Spirit －精霊－)	Unknown	Unknown	TBA	December 5, 2023
22	"The Karma"; Transliteration: "The Karma －Shukuen－" (Japanese: The Karma －宿縁－)	Unknown	Unknown	TBA	December 12, 2023
23	"The Declaration"; Transliteration: "The Declaration －Sensen Fukoku－" (Japanese: The Declaration －宣戦布告－)	Unknown	Unknown	TBA	December 19, 2023
24	"The Shinjuku War"; Transliteration: "The Shinjuku War－Shinjuku Taisen－" (Japanese: The Shinjuku War－新宿大戦－)	Unknown	Unknown	TBA	December 26, 2023

=== Novel ===
A spin-off novel written by Narita, titled Dead Mount Death Play Gaiden: Kaijin Solitaire no Shinsen Nisejutsu, centered around Solitaire's origins, began serialization on Manga Up! in May 2023. Three volumes have been released as of November 25, 2025.

No.	Release date	ISBN
1	November 25, 2023	978-4-7575-8882-0
2	November 25, 2024	978-4-7575-9532-3
3	November 25, 2025	978-4-301-00189-8

== Reception ==
Rebecca Silverman, Amy McNulty, and Teresa Navarro from Anime News Network offered praise for the artwork, plot, and characters, though they were critical of the fan service. Richard Gutierrez from The Fandom Post offered praise for the premise and artwork, though he felt the plot was too complicated and confusing.

In the 2020 Next Manga Award, the series ranked 20th in the print manga category.

== See also ==
- Red Raven, a manga series written and illustrated by Shinta Fujimoto
