= Carl Hillmann =

American politician (1870–1948)

Carl Hillmann (March 29, 1870 – June 20, 1948) was an American Republican politician from Wisconsin.

Born in Rantoul, Wisconsin, Hillmann served on the Rantoul Town Board, as Justice of the Peace, and on the Calumet County, Wisconsin Board of Supervisors. He served in the Wisconsin State Assembly in 1923, 1925, and 1927. He died in 1948.
