= Red Raven (polka) =

Red Raven is a polka standard. It has been recorded by Jimmy Sturr, also Whoopee John Wilfahrt and many other artists. Musical arrangements include "Red Raven" by Carl E. Olson, "Red Raven Rag" by Charley Straight, and "Red Raven Polka" by Frankie Yankovic. The music and associated lyrics (I Love to Polka) are subject to copyright.

The polka's name was taken by International Polka Association bandleader and Polka Hall of Famer Lawrence Duchow for his Red Raven Orchestra, which also recorded a "Red Raven Waltz".

Actually, this song was composed by Clayton Hofensperger, a member of the original Red Ravens Orchestra. The name "Red Raven" comes from the Red Raven Inn near Chilton, WI, the venue which the Red Ravens Orchestra called home. Hofensperger wrote many original polkas and waltzes for the Red Ravens Orchestra.
