= Red Raven (manga) =

Japanese manga series

- Manga
- Written by: Shinta Fujimoto
- Published by: Square Enix
- Magazine: Monthly Shōnen Gangan
- Original run: April 2010 – October 2013
- Volumes: 9

Red Raven is a Japanese manga series written and illustrated by Shinta Fujimoto. It was serialized between April 2010 and October 2013 in the magazine Monthly Shōnen Gangan and has been compiled into nine volumes.

== Synopsis ==
Plagued by corruption and injustice, the country has fallen into the hands of the mafia. The big cities have become the theater of a war opposing two mafia currents: the first, traditional, tries to restore stability in its districts and to protect the inhabitants while the second, new, uses "force" only in their own interests. Hoping to suppress this escalation of violence, the government set up a special organization, Red Raven. The latter aims to uphold the law by methods ... not always orthodox. In order to apply their death sentences, they employ extraordinary fighters, reputed to be ruthless. But at the heart of the conflict, a mysterious group, called the White Mafia, feeds the traffic in dangerous and illegal weapons called Sccaggs to plunge the world into chaos.

== Characters ==
=== Red Raven ===
Silvio Clerici (シルヴィオ・クレリチ, Shirubio Kurerichi)
Red Raven I, "The Hangman". Despite his air of intelligence and his glasses, he is the most brutal of the Red Ravens. His instruments of execution are handcuffs with the ties of which he strangles his victims. Blond with long hair, endowed with great physical strength, he has a tattoo representing a woman holding the scales of justice on the right hand and was in the past a rifleman (Italian policeman) with Joseph. He does not support injustice but is stubborn like a mule. He is a bit of a failed cop because he never managed to spare his Herculean strength, according to Joseph.
Walter Markin (ウォルター・マーキン, Worutā Mākin)
Red Raven II, "Merciless Undertaker". His execution instruments are a coffin and the crucifixes he stores there. 20 years old, the right lobe pierced with an earring in the shape of a cross, the red hair (of which he was ashamed (proof that he is a so-called child of the devil) until he meets Émilie, his best childhood friend, who complimented him on his "beautiful red hair"). In a jovial mood, he tends to "mother" Andy. He is someone who is attentive and very sensitive to other people's mood changes, often to his detriment. He loves motorcycles but only has an old bike that once belonged to Joseph and that he has refurbished. He looks like a kid and is sometimes rude (after Andy). An orphan from Castor Arte, he lost Emilie in a church fire 15 years ago, during the "5 Days of Blood" caused by the Sccaggs and the Caccini. As a result, Walter does not support the mafia nor forgive it for having caused the death of his friend. One of his reasons for joining the Red Ravens is his disdain for the Mafia system.
Joseph Calvi (ジョゼフ・カルヴィ, Jozefu Karubi)
Red Raven III, "the Electric Chair". Qualified as a veteran by Carlo, he is accompanied by Sanson, his surveillance crow. His instrument of execution is, as his nickname suggests, an electric chair. He seems to like crows, especially Charles, but abandons his own, making him watch or simply leaving him behind. He has a habit of buying candy with an apparently foul taste every time he goes to a new city. He was a rifleman with Silvio. He was the one who found Andy in the street after he escaped from the laboratory where he was a prisoner.
Andy (アンディ, Andi)
Red Raven IV, "the one-eyed headhunter". His execution instrument is a guillotine. 15 years old, blond, decked out in a "bizarre" bowl cut. Quite cold by nature, he pays no attention to others (well, that's what he wants to believe), he has a deplorable sense of direction and a phobia of everything that relates closely or far in the field of medicine (both instruments and places), a consequence of its painful past as a guinea pig among the Sccaggs. His monitoring crow is called Charles, of which the Red Raven often complains and sows as soon as he can (that is to say quite often), much to the dismay of the poor robot. Under his headband hides in fact the "Brute Eye", eyeball made by the Sccaggs and bearing their emblem which was forcibly implanted when he was a child. It allows him to follow the trajectory of bullets from any firearm. Andy also has a number of Sccaggs tattooed on the chest: the reverse No.003. He wants to take revenge on the Sccaggs and this is clearly one of the reasons that led him to become a Red Raven, even if he always retorts the opposite.
Connie (コニー, Konī)
Red Raven V, "the Thief of Spirits". She is known to date as the only female executioner. Insectophobic, she uses dominoes from which she releases neurotoxin. She can also heal thanks to her potions. She is albino-looking and has a crow called Henry. She doesn't get along with Ryan.
Ryan Aubrey
Red Raven VI, "the Executioner Witch Hunter" or "the Inquisitor Enjoyer". Dark and long hair, his face covered with piercing, he prefers to burn his prey until death follows. As a result, his instruments of execution are explosives and the ordeal of fire. He sometimes goes too far, which is why Connie is sometimes forced to stop him with her toxic gases. He also gets along with the girl like dog and cat.
Scotto Getty
Red Raven VII, "The Instigator of Heaven's Funeral". Short light hair, blase look, the lower half of his face is hidden by the collar of his coat. Described as "scary" by Longval, he takes care of monitoring and gathering information. In a sense, it is he who most resembles a red crow since he can communicate with real crows.
Carlo Scarlatti (カルロ・スカラルッティ, Karuro Sukararutti)
A government judge, he is the director of the Red Raven division. He is the son of one of the members of Parliament and is known to be the youngest judge in the country. He sometimes displays a devious smile and is, like Monica, bothered by his curly hair which gives the impression that he is not combed.
Monica (モニカ, Monika)
Subordinate to Carlo who is attentive and worried by nature, she has very poor eyesight and she cannot distinguish people's faces without her glasses. Like her supervisor, she is bothered by her hair for the same reasons.
Eliana
Red Raven HQ nurse.
Filippo
Employed at Red Raven HQ, he has been there for a while.
Katy
Employed at Red Raven HQ, colleague of Filippo and subordinate of Carlo.
Charles (シャルル, Sharuru)
Robot in the shape of a crow, he is responsible for monitoring Andy. He shows common sense and great vitality. Since he was traumatized by a fight that went wrong, he has had the bad habit of running away at the slightest danger. His beak and claws are not sharp enough to be able to injure but it is so hard that it can easily pierce its target.
Longval
Raven of Silvio, he is afraid of Scotto and has three spikes on his head.
Sanson
Raven of Joseph, he is quite docile and rather imposing.

=== The Mafia ===
==== Caccini family ====
Laura Caccini (ラウラ・カッチーニ, Raura Katchīni)
Current and first female head of the Caccini family, she is nicknamed "the Ghost Empress" because she has no criminal record, that no one had ever heard of her in the mafia world before she take the lead of the Caccini and that its origins remain unknown. She is Ricardo Caccini's older sister and, like all members of the Caccini family, she hates Sccaggs.
Ricardo Caccini (リカルド・カッチーニ, Rikarudo Katchīni)
Laura's younger brother, he leads his sister's "Black Dogs" elite squad. He has a burn scar on his left eye and is 23 years old. He is wary of women because of his angry sister and Mela who's a yandere. He handles knives particularly well. He "freaks out at Laura" after Cresson and kept running away from him when he was a child.
Mela (メーラ, Mēra)
This young girl with deceptive appearances is one of the "Dark Dogs" of the Ghost Empress. Sniper, she sticks Ricardo as soon as she can and does not take her eyes off him, so that when he is far away, she observes him with the rifle scope, which makes the poor leader of the "Black Dogs" fear that she might shoot him. She is very possessive and protective of him and is capable of sniping anyone who approaches or attacks her Ricardo.
Time (タイム, Taimu)
Member of the "Black Dogs", he speaks little and handles the saber.
Cresson (クレソン, Kureson)
Friend of Ricardo since their childhood and member of the "Black Dogs", he uses a large knife as a weapon. He is from Sassi, the old city of Aretam, and knows all the alleys of the city like his pocket. As a child, he sometimes went to fly in the new city and met Ricardo there in yet another runaway from the latter, whom he considers a brother.
Calogero Scalise (カロジェロ・スカリーゼ, Karojero Sukarīze)
Calogero, nicknamed the "Dog eats dog", is a big hat of the Caccini. He did not see very well that the leader of his beloved family was a woman and decided to acquire a more powerful "force", that of the dangerous and illegal Sccaggs weapons.

==== Vizzini family ====
Emilio Vizzini (エミリオ・ヴィッツィーニ, Emirio Bittsuīni)
He is the current head of the Vizzini family. What does he look like under his mask? Basil has heard that he has a big scar. Vizzini is a real pervert who devotes an exaggerated cult to beauty. It is him who chooses the clothes that Sfoglia wears. He is very large, which allows Sfoglia to always spot him easily. He is also the reverse No.008.

==== Dragonetti family ====
Bartolo Dragonetti (バルトロ・ドラゴネッティ, Barutoro Doragonetti)
He is the current head of the Dragonetti family. He is a bearded man with long hair.

==== Gallo family ====
Liberatore Gallo (リベラトーレ・ガッロ, Riberatōre Garro)
He is the current head of the Gallo family. He seems to be the oldest of the five generations of his line.

==== Bagwell family ====
Ashton Bagwell (アシュトン・バグウェル, Ashuton Baguweru)
He is the current head of the Bagwell family. He is a very bearded man. He is involved in the transportation industry. He has no specialty.

==== Giordani family ====
Anna Giordani (アンナ・ジョルダーニ, An'na Jorudāni)
4th head of the Giordani family, she is around 16 years old and knows Andy well, having rescued him while he was being chased by mobsters. Her family is one of those who protect citizens.

==== Sccaggs family or the White Mafia ====
Siegfried Sccaggs (ジークフリード・スキャッグス, Jīkufurīdo Sukyaggusu)
He's the head of the Sccaggs family. A true genius, he was only 20 years old when he set up his organization and it only took him two for the Sccaggs to become known worldwide through the manufacture and sale of powerful Sccaggs weapons. . He would have made the planet tremble more than once but was killed by the Caccini during "5 days of blood" by Castor Arte. This event destroyed the Sccaggs family. However, it turns out that the White Mafia and the Sccaggs are one and that Siegfried is still alive. He is the investigator of the experiments carried out on Andy as well as other subjects who joined his camp in order to adapt the man to the weapon, thus making the human body become a living weapon.Siegfried revives the Sccaggs by obtaining Vizzini's territory when he died.
Basil (バジル, Bajiru)
Reverse No.004, he is a great maniac of cleanliness. 17 years old, blond, still in a white suit, his eyebrows have been arched since his birth. Despite his haughty and mocking smile, he remains courteous to people and never forgets to greet them. His weapon is Sccaggs No.004, the "Poisoned Scorpion". It is endowed with a power which allows it to gnaw at any matter just by touching it: the "Erosive Hand".
Dario Galliano (ダリオ・ガリアーノ, Dario Gariāno)
Reverse No.002, he is nicknamed the "Commander". His weapon is the Sccaggs No.002, "Rifle bullet ant", composed of six blades which he controls thanks to the magnetic power of his left hand, the "Main Guide". He claims to be able to hear the voices of arms, whatever they are. His ears are pierced with black earrings and his left eye has started to rot since he was a failed guinea pig for the Brute Eye.
Lobelia (ロベリア, Roberia)
Reverse No.005, she wields "the Scolopendre". Emilie and her are in fact one. Considered dead during the massacre of "5 days of blood" by Castor Arte, she was saved by the Sccaggs who used her as a guinea pig. The Sccaggs replaced her burnt skin so as to give her an ultra-sensitive epidermis allowing her to guess the positions of her enemies and their next attacks. It turns out that she sank into madness and got stuck on the past because she does not recognize the Walter of the present, remembering only the lonely little boy with whom she always held her hand. She loves Walter's hair to the point of dyeing hers red, the same color as him. She ends up dying in the arms of her childhood friend.
Kevin Costa (ケビン・コスタ, Kebin Kosuta)
Reverse No.006, he is a dangerous man who only thinks of breaking everything he sees. He is very agile and speaks vulgarly despite his childish face.
Sfoglia (スフォリア, Suforia)
Reverse No.007, she is a little doll-like girl. She has the "Voice of the Doctrine" and is very attached to Vizzini. She was collected by the Red Ravens at the death of him.
Emilio Vizzini
Reverse No.008, he is the head of one of the five great families of the Mafia, the Vizzini family. He has the "Pillaging Arm". He picked up Sfoglia when she was abandoned by Siegfried Scaggs.

=== Others ===
Bruno Delvecchio (ブルーノ・デルヴェッキオ, Burūno Derubekkio)
Head of the Delvecchio family, he owned a numbered Sccaggs, which earned him to be executed by Andy.
Giorgio Bossi (ジョルジョ・ボッシ, Jorujo Bosshi)
Head of the Bossi family, he was executed by Andy for the same reason as Don Delvecchio, in addition to having created false notices of judgment.
Dion Lonergan (ダイオン・ロナガン, Daion Ronagan)
Former head of the Lonergan family, he was nicknamed "Lonergan the Repugnant" and known for not skimping on resources when he acted as head of the family. He was killed at home by a rival mafia. He was Tony's maternal grandfather.
Ciro Dulbecco (チーロ・ダルベッコ, Chīro Darubekko)
Tony Lonergan (トニー・ロナガン, Tonī Ronagan)
Tony is the grandson of Dion Lonergan.
Mira (ミラ, Mira)
Jake (ジェイク, Jeiku)

== Manga ==
=== Technical sheet ===
- Japanese edition: Square Enix
  - Number of volumes released: 9 (complete)
  - Date of first publication: September 2010
  - Serialized: Monthly Shōnen Gangan
- French edition: Kana
  - Number of volumes released: 9 (complete)
  - Date of first publication: July 2012
  - Format: 115 mm x 175 mm

=== List of chapters ===
No.	Original release date	Original ISBN	French release date	French ISBN
1	September 22, 2010 (Note: Volume 1)	978-4-7575-2993-9	July 6, 2012 (Note: Volume 1)	978-2-50-501488-1
Chapter 1: The Raven and the Mafia; Chapter 2: Those Who Disturb the Peace; Chapter 3: Fragments of Sccaggs; Chapter 4: Unexpected Interference
Cover: Andy
2	February 22, 2011 (Note: Volume 2)	978-4-7575-3153-6	July 6, 2012 (Note: Volume 2)	978-2-50-501489-8
Chapter 5: The Second Raven; Chapter 6: Choice of Luggage; Chapter 7: Standby; Chapter 8: Getting in Touch; Chapter 9: Exhibition
Cover: Walter Markin
3	July 22, 2011 (Note: Volume 3)	978-4-7575-3285-4	October 5, 2012 (Note: Volume 3)	978-2-50-501555-0
Chapter 10: Versus; Chapter 11: Transformation; Chapter 12: Expectations and Reality; Chapter 13: Period; Chapter 14: Beyond the Eye
Cover: Basil
4	January 21, 2012 (Note: Volume 4)	978-4-7575-3438-4	March 15, 2013 (Note: Volume 4)	978-2-5050-1768-4
Chapter 15: The Black Earrings; Chapter 16: The [ ] That Treads Firmly; Chapter 17: He Who's Kept Alive by the Weapon; Chapter 18: A Glimpse of the Truth; Chapter 19: The One Who Preaches Difference; Chapter 20: The Raised Blade
Cover: Dario Galliano
5	July 21, 2012 (Note: Volume 5)	978-4-7575-3622-7	July 5, 2013 (Note: Volume 5)	978-2-5050-1870-4
Chapter 21: The Future of Will; Chapter 22: Devil's Child; Chapter 23: The Cliff's Shadow; Chapter 24: Where the Anger Goes; Chapter 25: Miracles Won't Happen; Chapter 26: The Other Side of Red
Cover: Ricardo Caccini
6	January 22, 2013 (Note: Volume 6)	978-4-7575-3854-2	November 8, 2013 (Note: Volume 6)	978-2-5050-1871-1
Chapter 27: Forced Execution; Chapter 28: Connection; Chapter 29: Judgment Seat; Chapter 30: Compensation; Chapter 31: Lobelia
Cover: Lobelia
7	July 22, 2013 (Note: Volume 7)	978-4-7575-4001-9	May 23, 2014 (Note: Volume 7)	978-2-5050-6034-5
Chapter 32: Hidden Thoughts; Chapter 33: Carnival; Chapter 34: Scheming Masquerade Ball; Chapter 35: Cupola
Cover: Connie
8	October 22, 2013 (Note: Volume 8)	978-4-7575-4085-9	September 19, 2014 (Note: Volume 8)	978-2-5050-6131-1
Chapter 36: Confrontation; Chapter 37: Determination; Chapter 38: Bonds; Chapter 39: No Number
Cover: Vizzini et Sfoglia
9	January 22, 2014 (Note: Volume 9)	978-4-7575-4169-6	December 5, 2014 (Note: Volume 9)	978-2-5050-6145-8
Chapter 40: The Opposing Strength; Chapter 41: Reverse Number; Chapter 42: Dictator; Chapter 43: Second Eye; Chapter 44: Path
Cover: Andy

== See also ==
- Dead Mount Death Play – A manga series also illustrated by Shinta Fujimoto.
