= Rockland, Manitowoc County, Wisconsin =

Rockland, Wisconsin
- Town
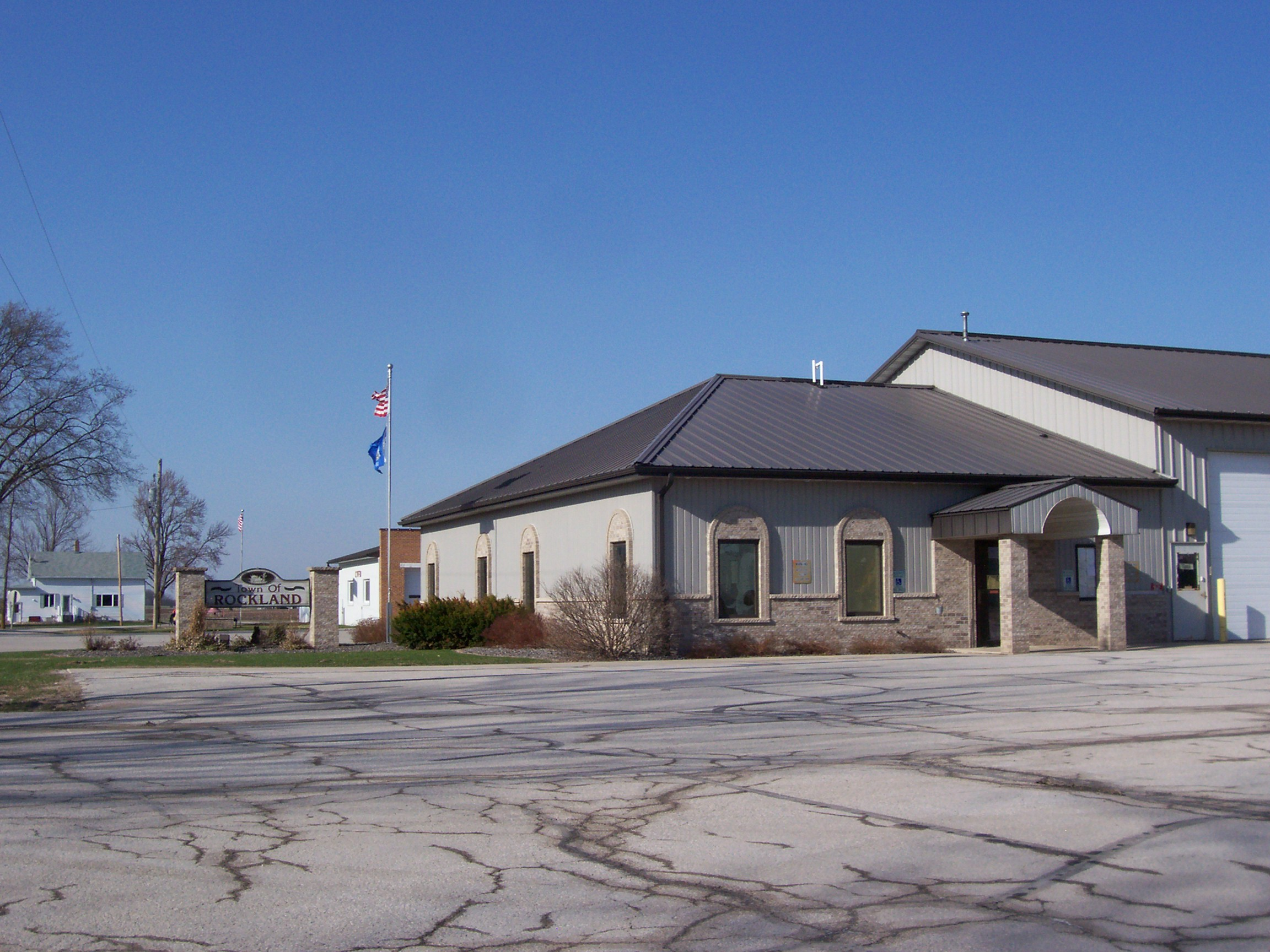
- Town hall in Collins

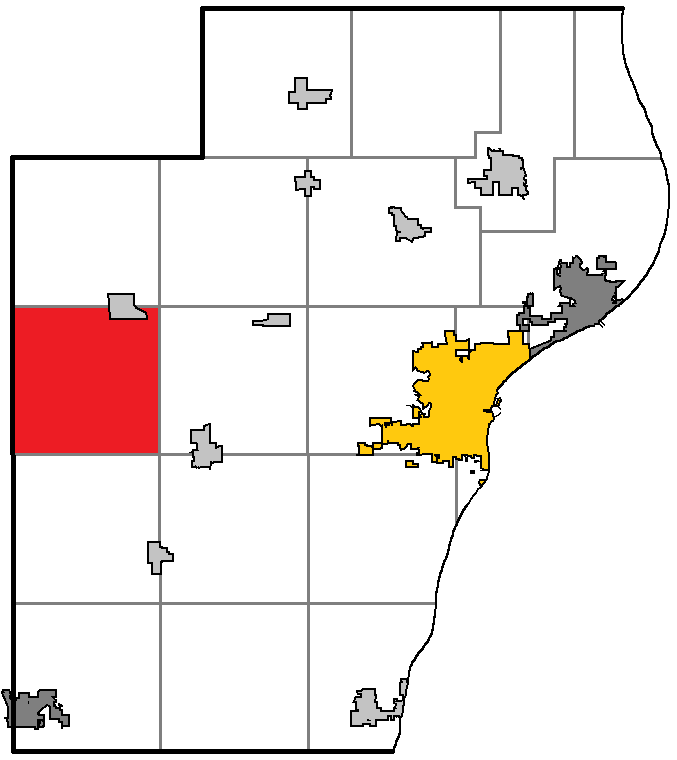
- Location of Rockland, within Manitowoc County
- Coordinates: 44°6′5″N 87°58′56″W
- Country: United States
- State: Wisconsin
- County: Manitowoc

Area
  - Total: 35.5 sq mi (92.0 km^{2})
  - Land: 34.5 sq mi (89.4 km^{2})
  - Water: 1.0 sq mi (2.6 km^{2})
- Elevation: 807 ft (246 m)

Population (2020)
  - Total: 995
  - Density: 28.8/sq mi (11.1/km^{2})
- Time zone: UTC-6 (Central (CST))
  - Summer (DST): UTC-5 (CDT)
- Area code: 920
- FIPS code: 55-68925
- GNIS feature ID: 1584057
- Website: https://townofrocklandmanitowoccountywi.gov/

Rockland is a town in Manitowoc County, Wisconsin, United States. The population was 995 at the 2020 census. The unincorporated community of Collins is located in the town. The unincorporated community of Wells is also partially located within the town.

== Geography ==
According to the United States Census Bureau, the town has a total area of 35.5 square miles (92.0 km^{2}), of which 34.5 square miles (89.4 km^{2}) is land and 1.0 square miles (2.6 km^{2}) (2.84%) is water.

== Demographics ==
As of the census of 2000, there were 896 people, 308 households, and 255 families residing in the town. The population density was 26.0 people per square mile (10.0/km^{2}). There were 336 housing units at an average density of 9.7 per square mile (3.8/km^{2}). The racial makeup of the town was 98.21% White, 0.45% Native American, 1.00% from other races, and 0.33% from two or more races. Hispanic or Latino people of any race were 1.79% of the population.

There were 308 households, out of which 38.6% had children under the age of 18 living with them, 75.0% were married couples living together, 4.2% had a female householder with no husband present, and 17.2% were non-families. 13.6% of all households were made up of individuals, and 5.8% had someone living alone who was 65 years of age or older. The average household size was 2.91 and the average family size was 3.23.

In the town, the population was spread out, with 26.5% under the age of 18, 7.1% from 18 to 24, 31.1% from 25 to 44, 25.8% from 45 to 64, and 9.5% who were 65 years of age or older. The median age was 36 years. For every 100 females, there were 109.3 males. For every 100 females age 18 and over, there were 109.2 males.

The median income for a household in the town was $53,500, and the median income for a family was $56,635. Males had a median income of $34,219 versus $22,625 for females. The per capita income for the town was $19,798. About 6.4% of families and 7.9% of the population were below the poverty line, including 13.4% of those under age 18 and 10.8% of those age 65 or over.

== Notable people ==
- Martin Rappel, farmer, businessman, and politician, was born in the town
