= Lawrence Duchow =

American polka musician, 1914-1972

- Born: May 9, 1914; Potter, Wisconsin, U.S.
- Died: December 16, 1972 (aged 58)
- Genre: Polka
- Occupations: Musician, radio host
- Label: RCA Victor
- Formerly of: Red Raven Orchestra

Lawrence Duchow (May 9, 1914 – December 16, 1972) was an American polka bandleader who recorded on the RCA Victor label from 1932 to 1954.

== Career ==
Born in Potter, Wisconsin, Duchow was a member of the International Polka Association and Polka Hall of Fame. With his Red Raven Orchestra, named after the Red Raven Polka, he competed in polka contests against the bands of Frankie Yankovic, Whoopee John Wilfahrt, Romy Gosz, Louis Bashell, and Harold Loeffelmacher.

Duchow played many of his shows at Kleist's Hall in Potter, Wisconsin. At one time, he had a weekly radio show on WGN in Chicago. In November 1947, he had a Billboard chart hit with "Swiss Boy", which reached number 23.

He was involved in a bogus check scandal in 1953 and arrested in New York. He then resettled in California, but he returned to Wisconsin in 1969.
