= Potter, Wisconsin =

- Village
- Motto: Where Friends are Dear
- Location of Potter in Calumet County, Wisconsin.
- Coordinates: 44°7′7″N 88°5′44″W
- Country: United States
- State: Wisconsin
- County: Calumet

Area
  - Total: 0.52 sq mi (1.34 km^{2})
  - Land: 0.51 sq mi (1.31 km^{2})
  - Water: 0.012 sq mi (0.03 km^{2})
- Elevation: 817 ft (249 m)

Population (2020)
  - Total: 244
  - Density: 482/sq mi (186/km^{2})
- Time zone: UTC-6 (Central (CST))
  - Summer (DST): UTC-5 (CDT)
- Area code: 920
- FIPS code: 55-64675
- GNIS feature ID: 1571841
- Website: http://villageofpotter.com/

Potter is a village in Calumet County in the U.S. state of Wisconsin. The population was 244 at the 2020 census.

== History ==
Potter was established near a Native American village along the Manitowoc River. It was originally named Muskratville because of the large number of muskrats that lived in the river and were trapped for their fur. American Civil War Captain Orin R. Potter settled in Potter in 1859 and established a feed mill. That same year he renamed the village Potter Mills, which was later shortened to Potter.

=== 150 years celebration ===
The village celebrated its 150th anniversary on July 19, 2009, with the second parade in the village's history. The first parade was a 1907 "Medicine man parade." Five of Potter's great-great grandchildren attended the parade.

== Geography ==
Potter is located at 44°7′7″N 88°5′44″W (44.118544, -88.095467).

According to the United States Census Bureau, the village has a total area of 0.55 square miles (1.42 km^{2}), of which, 0.54 square miles (1.40 km^{2}) of it is land and 0.01 square miles (0.03 km^{2}) is water.

== Demographics ==
Historical population
Census	Pop.	Note	%±
1990	252		—
2000	223		−11.5%
2010	253		13.5%
2020	244		−3.6%
U.S. Decennial Census

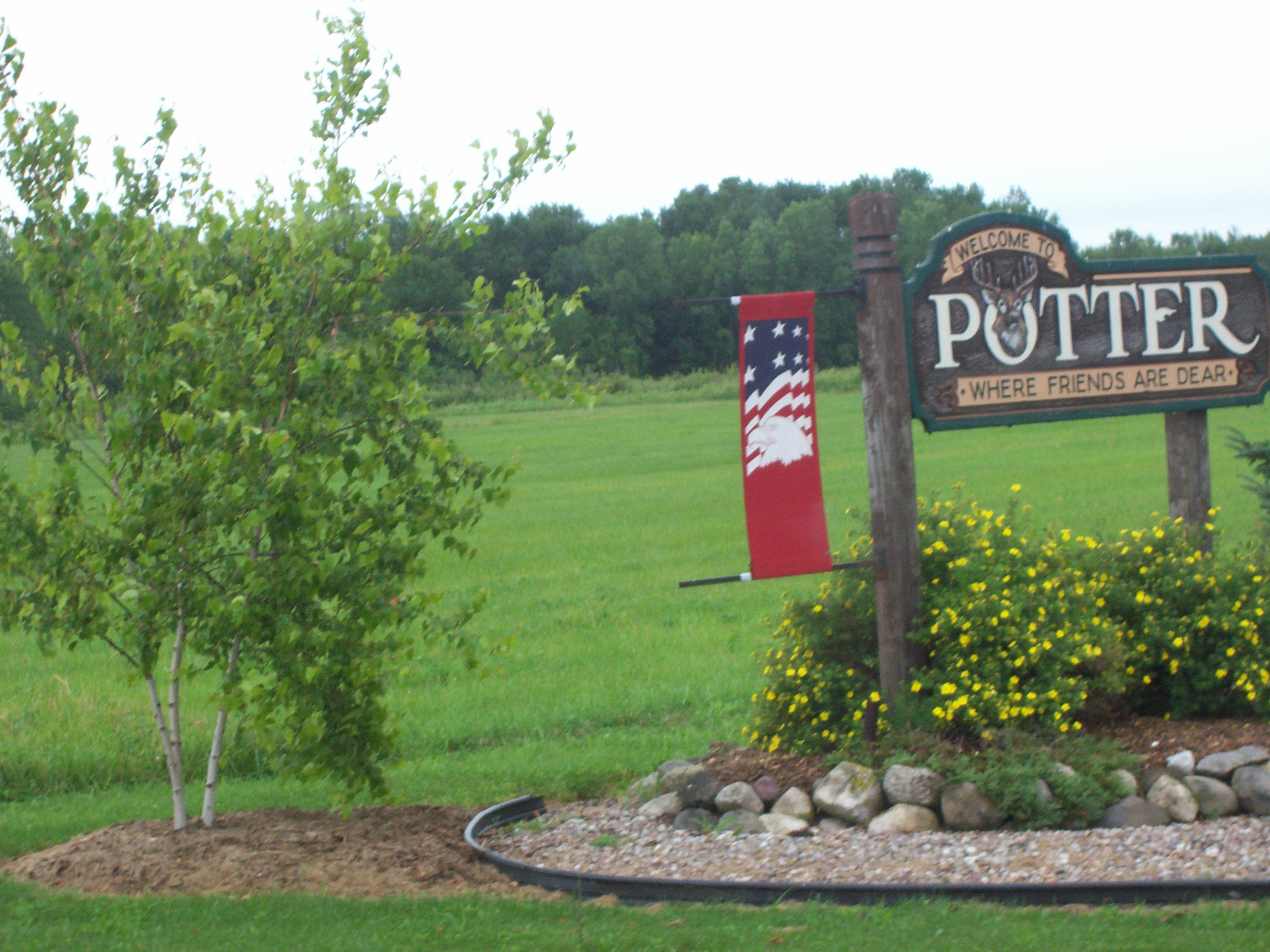
Welcome sign

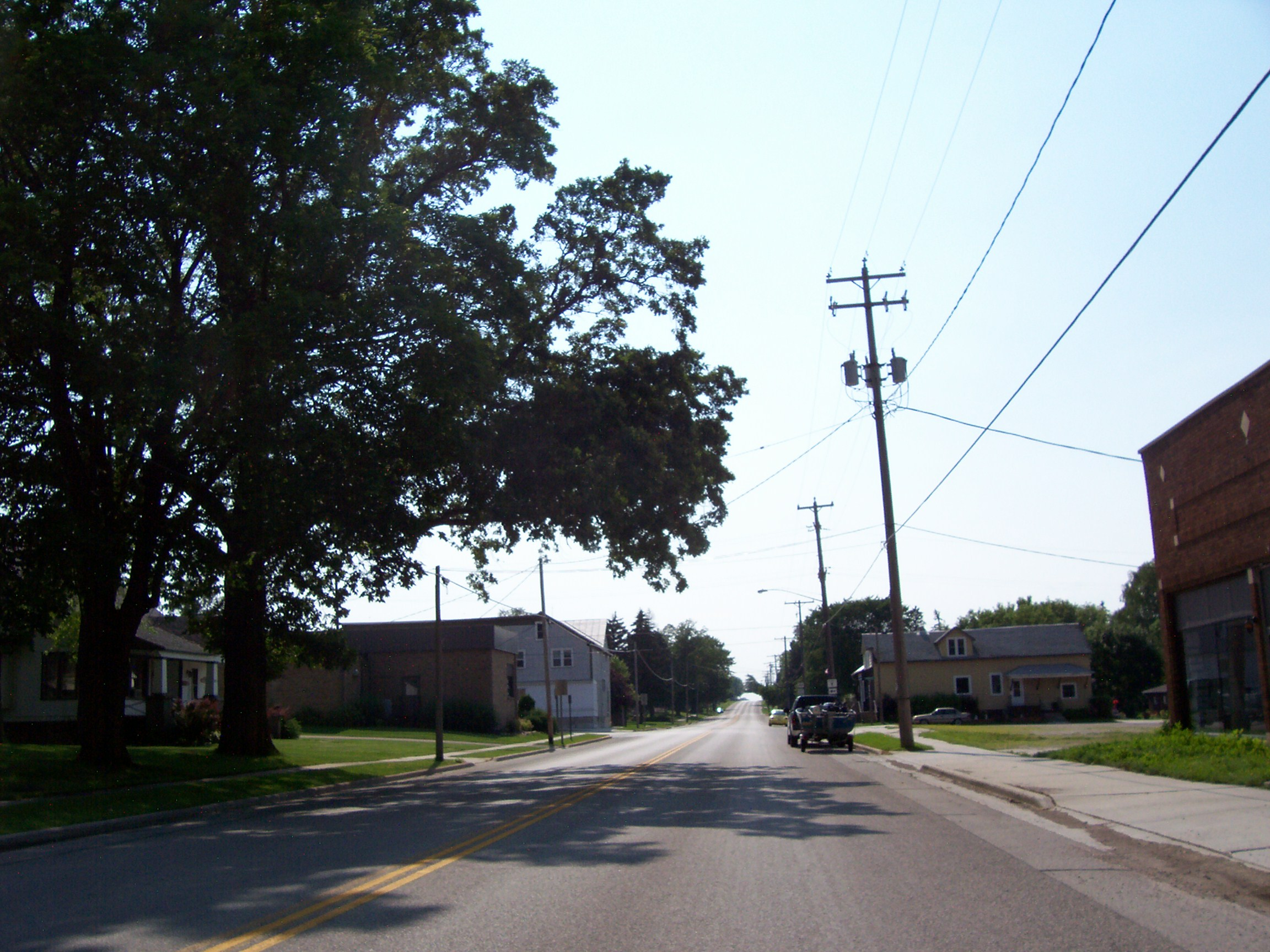
Looking west on Highway PP in Potter

=== 2010 census ===
As of the census of 2010, there were 253 people, 98 households, and 70 families living in the village. The population density was 468.5 inhabitants per square mile (180.9/km^{2}). There were 99 housing units at an average density of 183.3 per square mile (70.8/km^{2}). The racial makeup of the village was 96.8% White, 0.8% African American, 2.0% Native American, and 0.4% from two or more races. Hispanic or Latino of any race were 2.8% of the population.

There were 98 households, of which 35.7% had children under the age of 18 living with them, 60.2% were married couples living together, 7.1% had a female householder with no husband present, 4.1% had a male householder with no wife present, and 28.6% were non-families. 24.5% of all households were made up of individuals, and 7.1% had someone living alone who was 65 years of age or older. The average household size was 2.58 and the average family size was 3.09.

The median age in the village was 38.8 years. 28.1% of residents were under the age of 18; 5.1% were between the ages of 18 and 24; 28.1% were from 25 to 44; 23.2% were from 45 to 64; and 15.4% were 65 years of age or older. The gender makeup of the village was 50.2% male and 49.8% female.

=== 2000 census ===
As of the census of 2000, there were 223 people, 78 households, and 59 families living in the village. The population density was 422.6 people per square mile (162.5/km^{2}). There were 80 housing units at an average density of 151.6 per square mile (58.3/km^{2}). The racial makeup of the village was 97.31% White, 0.45% Native American, and 2.24% from two or more races.

There were 78 households, out of which 39.7% had children under the age of 18 living with them, 64.1% were married couples living together, 9.0% had a female householder with no husband present, and 23.1% were non-families. 16.7% of all households were made up of individuals, and 11.5% had someone living alone who was 65 years of age or older. The average household size was 2.86 and the average family size was 3.23.

In the village, the population was spread out, with 28.3% under the age of 18, 7.2% from 18 to 24, 33.6% from 25 to 44, 15.7% from 45 to 64, and 15.2% who were 65 years of age or older. The median age was 32 years. For every 100 females, there were 92.2 males. For every 100 females age 18 and over, there were 88.2 males.

The median income for a household in the village was $43,958, and the median income for a family was $45,833. Males had a median income of $29,375 versus $22,614 for females. The per capita income for the village was $14,519. About 6.3% of families and 5.7% of the population were below the poverty line, including 6.8% of those under the age of eighteen and 8.3% of those 65 or over.

== Notable residents ==
- Lawrence Duchow, bandleader
- Henry Kleist, farmer and Socialist State Senator
- Otto Lerche, farmer and Socialist State Representative
