= Martin Rappel =

American politician

Martin Rappel (February 18, 1867 – June 22, 1930) was an American businessman, farmer, and politician.

Born in the Town of Rockland, Manitowoc County, Wisconsin, Rappel was a farmer and stock dealer in the town. He was vice-president, shareholder and director of Collins State Bank. Rappel was the Rockland town chairman and assessor and served on the Manitowoc County Board of Supervisors. He was on the board of trustees for the Manitowoc County Insane Asylum. In 1917, Rappel served in the Wisconsin State Assembly as a Democrat. Rappel died of a stroke in Sturgeon Bay, Wisconsin while on a weekend fishing trip.
