= List of people from Janesville, Wisconsin =

The following notable people were born in or are associated with Janesville, Wisconsin.

== Artists and performers ==
- Pete Lee (comedian)
- Tim Davis, co-founder of The Steve Miller Band
- Gloria Foster, actress
- Karron Graves, actress
- Carrie Jacobs-Bond, songwriter
- Tad Kubler, guitarist for The Hold Steady
- Kerwin Mathews, actor
- Charles McCarron, vaudeville composer
- Manilla Powers, singer, vaudeville performer, musical theater comedian
- Leoni W. Robinson, architect
- Tom Welling, actor (lived in Janesville briefly during childhood)
- Ella Wheeler Wilcox, poet

== Athletes ==
- Mistie Bass (Mistie Williams), WNBA player
- Keeanu Benton, NFL player
- Frank Bliss, MLB player
- Tommy Cronin, NFL player
- Moxie Dalton, NFL player
- Stan Fox, race car driver, eight-time starter at the Indianapolis 500
- Tucker Fredricks, Olympic speedskater
- Fred Hayner. baseball player
- Larry Hough, Olympic rower
- Paul Janus, NFL player
- Travis Kvapil, NASCAR driver
- John Morrissey, professional baseball player
- Tom Morrissey, professional baseball player
- Joe Riggert, MLB player
- Terry Ryan, MLB manager
- Peter Shorts, NFL player
- Bob Strampe, MLB player

== Military personnel ==
- Leslie Allen Bellrichard, Medal of Honor recipient, Vietnam
- James Bintliff, Union Army general
- Victor Bleasdale, Navy Cross and Distinguished Service Cross recipient
- Frank Matteson Bostwick, U.S. Navy commodore
- James E. Croft, Medal of Honor recipient, Civil War
- Gerald L. Endl, Medal of Honor recipient, World War II
- Theodore W. Goldin, Medal of Honor recipient, American Indian Wars
- John Johnson, Medal of Honor recipient, Civil War
- John E. McCoy, U.S. Air National Guard general
- Henry Palmer, Union Army general
- James Pond, Medal of Honor recipient, Civil War
- Thomas H. Ruger, Civil War general and military governor of Georgia under occupation
- Lyle Seeman, military engineer, administrator, and commander involved in the Manhattan Project; college football player for the West Point team
- Claron A. Windus, Medal of Honor recipient

== Politicians ==
- C. S. Amsden, South Dakota state representative and senator
- William A. Barstow, governor of Wisconsin, Union Army general
- Harry W. Bolens, Wisconsin state senator
- Stephen Bolles, U.S. representative
- William B. Britton, Wisconsin state representative
- James H. Budd, governor of California
- Zebulon P. Burdick, Wisconsin state senator
- Bob Carr, U.S. representative from Michigan
- Peter P. Carr, Wisconsin state senator
- John B. Cassoday, chief justice of the Wisconsin Supreme Court
- Harmon Sweatland Conger, U.S. representative from New York
- Dave Considine, educator and Wisconsin state representative
- Tim Cullen, Wisconsin state senator
- Joseph Doe, U.S. Assistant Secretary of War
- Russ Feingold, U.S. senator
- Edwin G. Fifield, Wisconsin state representative
- Alexander Graham, New York and Wisconsin state representative
- Gilbert N. Haugen, U.S. representative from Iowa
- Fenner Kimball, Wisconsin state representative
- James H. Knowlton, Wisconsin state representative
- Debra Kolste, Wisconsin state representative
- William A. Lawrence, Wisconsin state representative and senator
- Don L. Love, mayor of Lincoln, Nebraska
- Allen P. Lovejoy, Wisconsin state senator
- David W. Márquez, Alaska attorney general
- Alexander E. Matheson, Wisconsin state representative and jurist
- Max Maxfield, Wyoming secretary of state
- Hiram Merrill, Wisconsin state representative
- Cyrus Miner, Wisconsin state representative
- David Noggle, Wisconsin state representative, chief justice of the Supreme Court of the Idaho Territory
- Thomas S. Nolan, Wisconsin state representative
- Pliny Norcross, mayor of Janesville and Wisconsin state representative
- Andrew Palmer, Wisconsin state senator
- Henry A. Patterson, Wisconsin state representative
- Anson W. Pope, Wisconsin state representative
- Steve Preston, U.S. Secretary of Housing and Urban Development
- Paul Ryan, former speaker of the U.S. House of Representatives
- Michael J. Sheridan, former speaker of the Wisconsin State Assembly
- Ithamar C. Sloan, U.S. representative from Wisconsin
- A. Hyatt Smith, politician and businessman
- Bryan Steil, U.S. representative for Wisconsin
- E. Ray Stevens, justice of the Wisconsin Supreme Court
- James Sutherland, Wisconsin state senator
- George Tarrant Sr., Wisconsin state representative
- Henry Tarrant, Wisconsin state representative
- Howard Teasdale, Wisconsin state senator
- Alexander McDonald Thomson, former speaker of the Wisconsin State Assembly
- Charles L. Valentine, Wisconsin state representative
- William G. Wheeler, Wisconsin state representative and U.S. attorney
- John Meek Whitehead, Wisconsin state senator
- Edward V. Whiton, chief justice of the Wisconsin Supreme Court
- Charles G. Williams, U.S. representative
- George H. Williston, Wisconsin territorial and state legislator
- Agesilaus Wilson, Wisconsin state representative
- Wayne W. Wood, Wisconsin state representative
- Edwin E. Woodman, Wisconsin state senator

== Other ==
- David Adamany, president of Temple University
- Sanford Soverhill Atwood, sixteenth president of Emory University
- John Henry Comstock, entomologist
- Joseph Dutton, Civil War veteran and later missionary to the lepers of Molokai
- Jim Fitzgerald, former owner of the Milwaukee Bucks and the Golden State Warriors
- Lavinia Goodell, first woman licensed to practice law in Wisconsin
- William Goodell, abolitionist
- Ken Hendricks, Forbes 400 businessman
- Walter Lees, early aviator
- Jenkin Lloyd Jones, Unitarian minister and magazine editor
- Mary Kimball Morgan (1861–1948), American educator and college president
- George S. Parker, founder of the Parker Pen Company
- Alonzo W. Pond, archaeologist and speleogist
- Allene Tew, socialite during the Gilded Age who became a European aristocrat by marriage
- Frances Willard, educator and activist (raised and first taught here)
- Daniel Hale Williams, African-American surgeon and heart surgery pioneer, raised and first employed here
