= John Winans =

American politician (1831–1907)

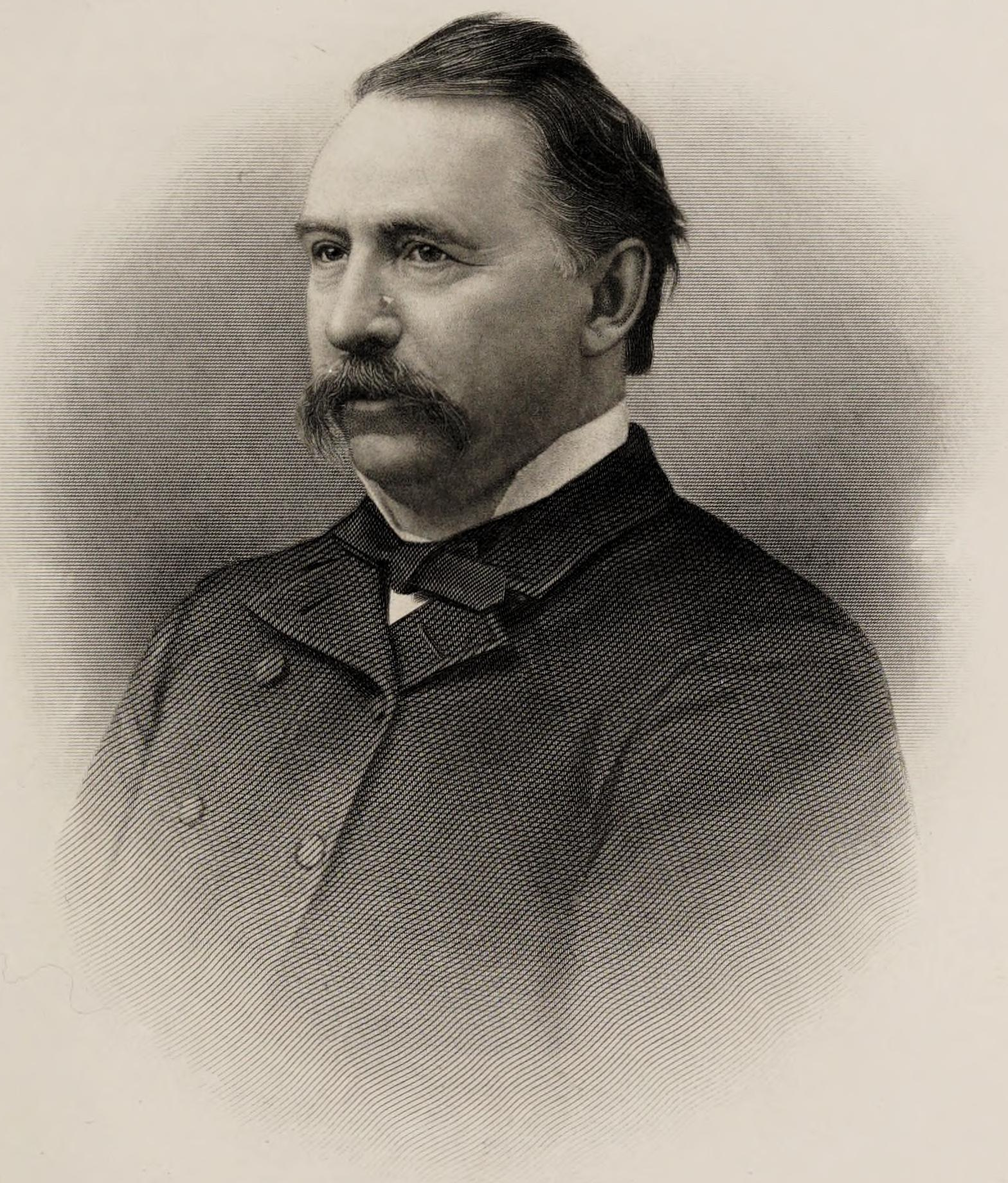

25th Mayor of Janesville, Wisconsin
- In office April 1885 – April 1889
- Preceded by: Alexander Richardson
- Succeeded by: James W. St. John

Member of the U.S. House of Representatives from Wisconsin's 1st district
- In office March 4, 1883 – March 3, 1885
- Preceded by: Charles G. Williams
- Succeeded by: Lucien B. Caswell

Member of the Wisconsin State Assembly from the Rock 2nd district
- In office January 5, 1891 – January 2, 1893
- Preceded by: Cyrus Miner
- Succeeded by: Paul M. Green
- In office January 3, 1887 – January 7, 1889
- Preceded by: Pliny Norcross
- Succeeded by: Cyrus Miner
- In office January 2, 1882 – January 1, 1883
- Preceded by: Franklin S. Lawrence
- Succeeded by: William B. Britton

Member of the Wisconsin State Assembly from the Rock 5th district
- In office January 5, 1874 – January 4, 1875
- Preceded by: Henry A. Patterson
- Succeeded by: Hiram Merrill

Personal details
- Born: September 27, 1831 Vernon, New Jersey, U.S.
- Died: January 17, 1907 (aged 75) Janesville, Wisconsin, U.S.
- Resting place: Oak Hill Cemetery, Janesville
- Party: Democratic; Reform (1873-1874)
- Spouses: Margaret Cochran (died 1878); Emma F. Wood (died 1881); Fannie Maria Copeland (m. 1882–1907)
- Children: none
- Parents: William R. Winans (father); Catherine (Simonson) Winans (mother)
- Profession: lawyer

John Winans (September 27, 1831 – January 17, 1907) was an American lawyer and Democratic politician from Janesville, Wisconsin. He served one term in the U.S. House of Representatives, representing Wisconsin's 1st congressional district during the 48th Congress (1883–1885). He then served as the 25th mayor of Janesville, from 1885 to 1889. Earlier, he represented Janesville and central Rock County for six years in Wisconsin State Assembly.

== Background ==
Winans was born in Vernon Township, New Jersey, and was educated in public and private schools. His first cousin Ross Winans was an important pioneer in railroad engineering in Baltimore, and Ross's children Thomas and William Winans built the first rail system in Russia and became extraordinary wealthy.

He studied law and was admitted to the bar in 1855. He came to Wisconsin in 1857 and settled in Janesville, where he practiced his profession. He served as member of the city council of Janesville in 1861, and as city attorney several times. He served as delegate to the 1864 Democratic National Convention, and in 1868 was the Democratic nominee for Congress from Wisconsin's 2nd congressional district, against incumbent Republican Benjamin F. Hopkins.

== Legislature ==
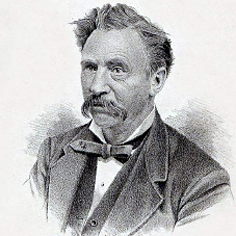

Winans was first elected to the State Assembly from Rock County's 5th Assembly district (the City of Janesville) in 1873 as a member of the short-lived Reform Party, a coalition of Democrats, reform and Liberal Republicans, and Grangers formed in 1873, which secured the election for two years of William Robert Taylor as Governor of Wisconsin. He received 741 votes to 633 for Republican incumbent Henry A. Patterson, and was assigned to the standing committee on the judiciary, of which he was elected chairman. He ran for re-election in 1874 under the "Democratic Reform" label (the Reform coalition had begun to dissolve, and Taylor would lose his 1875 bid for re-election), but was unseated by Republican Hiram Merrill, who drew 799 votes to 694 for Winans. Winans served as a colonel on the staff of Governor Taylor in 1874 and 1875.

He returned to the practice of law, and was elected to the Assembly again as a Democrat in 1881 from the new 2nd Rock County district (the City of Janesville, plus the Towns of Janesville and Rock) with 806 votes to 618 for Republican Oscar F. Nowlan and 109 for Prohibitionist G. W. Lawrence (Republican incumbent Franklin Lawrence was not a candidate for re-election; it is unknown whether the two Lawrences were related). He returned to the judiciary committee, and was also assigned to the committee on bills on the third reading. Winans was also selected by the Wisconsin Supreme Court in 1882 as one of the Commissioners to represent them in planning the expansion of the Wisconsin State Capitol Building.

== Congress ==
Winans was elected as an independent Democrat to the Forty-eighth Congress (March 4, 1883 – March 3, 1885) representing Wisconsin's 1st congressional district, unseating five-term Republican incumbent Charles G. Williams, with 12,307 votes to 11,853 for Williams, 2207 for Prohibitionist C. M. Blackman, and 10 for former State Senator William L. Utley, who had served in the legislature as a Free Soiler and a Republican, but was now a Greenback.

He was not a candidate for renomination in 1884, since he was running for mayor of Janesville. He was succeeded in Congress by Republican Lucien Caswell.

== After Congress ==
He was elected mayor of Janesville in April 1885 for a two-year term, over Republican Charles Valentine. He was elected to the Assembly as a Democrat again in 1886, after being defeated in a run for the United States Senate by incumbent Republican Philetus Sawyer, who won the votes of 82 legislators, to 37 for Winans and six for Populist John Cochrane. For the Assembly, he received 1,132 votes to 1,047 for Republican Oscar Nowland (Republican incumbent Pliny Norcross was not a candidate) and 91 for Prohibitionist James Harris. When the Assembly session opened, he was the Democratic candidate for Speaker, losing to Republican Thomas B. Mills in what turned out to be a six-man race. He once more returned to the judiciary committee, and to the committee on bills on the third reading. He was not a candidate for re-election in 1888, and was succeeded by Republican Cyrus Miner.

He was elected to the Assembly (as a Democrat) for the final time in 1890; the 2nd district no longer included the Town of Rock, but did include those of Center and Harmony. He received 1487 votes to 1308 for Nowland and 67 for Prohibitionist C. W. Cook. He again became chair of the judiciary committee; and was also on the joint committees on charitable and penal institutions, and on apportionment (serving as Assembly co-chair of the latter committee). After the redistricting of 1891, most of his district was put in the new 3rd Rock County Assembly district; Winans did not run for re-election, and was succeeded by fellow Democrat Agesilaus Wilson.

== Out of office again ==
He ran for Assembly again in 1896, but was defeated by William G. Wheeler, who had apprenticed in his law offices as a young man.

He continue to engage in the practice of law in Janesville, until his death on January 17, 1907. He was interred in Oak Hill Cemetery.

== Electoral history ==
=== U.S. House, Wisconsin's 2nd district (1868) ===
Wisconsin's 2nd Congressional District Election, 1868
Party	Candidate	Votes	%	±%
General Election, November 3, 1868
Republican	Benjamin F. Hopkins (incumbent)	18,333	46.66%	−2.38pp
Democratic	John Winans	12,659	44.94%	
Plurality		5,674	18.31%	-4.76pp
Total votes		30,992	100.0%	+34.97%
Republican hold				

=== Wisconsin Assembly (1873, 1881) ===
Wisconsin Assembly, Rock 5th District Election, 1873
Party	Candidate	Votes	%	±%
General Election, November 4, 1873
Democratic	John Winans	741	53.93%	+13.08%
Republican	Henry A. Patterson	633	46.07%	
Total votes		1,374	100.0%	-7.22%
Democratic gain from Republican				

Wisconsin Assembly, Rock 2nd District Election, 1881
Party	Candidate	Votes	%	±%
General Election, November 8, 1881
Democratic	John Winans	896	53.24%	+15.12%
Republican	O. F. Nowlan	618	36.72%	−25.16%
Prohibition	G. W. Lawrence	169	10.04%	
Total votes		1,683	100.0%	-25.13%
Democratic gain from Republican				

=== U.S. House, Wisconsin's 1st district (1882) ===
Wisconsin's 1st Congressional District Election, 1882
Party	Candidate	Votes	%	±%
General Election, November 7, 1882
Democratic	John Winans	12,307	46.66%	+8.40pp
Republican	Charles G. Williams (incumbent)	11,853	44.94%	−16.80pp
Prohibition	C. M. Blackman	2,207	8.37%	
Greenback	William L. Utley	10	0.04%	
Plurality		454	1.72%	-21.76pp
Total votes		26,377	100.0%	-14.35%
Democratic gain from Republican				

=== Wisconsin Assembly (1886, 1890, 1896) ===
Wisconsin Assembly, Rock 2nd District Election, 1886
Party	Candidate	Votes	%	±%
General Election, November 2, 1886
Democratic	John Winans	1,132	49.87%	+5.97%
Republican	Oscar F. Nowlan	1,047	46.12%	−9.98%
Prohibition	G. W. Lawrence	91	4.01%	
Total votes		2,270	100.0%	-16.61%
Democratic gain from Republican				

Wisconsin Assembly, Rock 2nd District Election, 1890
Party	Candidate	Votes	%	±%
General Election, November 4, 1890
Democratic	John Winans	1,487	51.96%	+6.42%
Republican	Oscar F. Nowlan	1,308	45.70%	−6.70%
Prohibition	C. W. Cook	67	2.34%	
Total votes		2,862	100.0%	-7.71%
Democratic gain from Republican				

Wisconsin Assembly, Rock 1st District Election, 1896
Party	Candidate	Votes	%	±%
General Election, November 3, 1896
Republican	William G. Wheeler	2,235	59.86%	
Democratic	John Winans	1,499	40.14%	
Total votes		3,734	100.0%	
Republican hold				

== Sources ==
- United States Congress. "John Winans (id: W000627)". Biographical Directory of the United States Congress.

Wisconsin State Assembly
Preceded by Henry A. Patterson	Member of the Wisconsin State Assembly from the Rock 5th district January 5, 1874 – January 4, 1875	Succeeded by Hiram Merrill
Preceded by Franklin S. Lawrence	Member of the Wisconsin State Assembly from the Rock 2nd district January 2, 1882 – January 1, 1883	Succeeded by William B. Britton
Preceded by Pliny Norcross	Member of the Wisconsin State Assembly from the Rock 2nd district January 3, 1887 – January 7, 1889	Succeeded by Cyrus Miner
Preceded by Cyrus Miner	Member of the Wisconsin State Assembly from the Rock 2nd district January 5, 1891 – January 2, 1893	Succeeded by Paul M. Green
U.S. House of Representatives
Preceded by Charles Grandison Williams	Member of the U.S. House of Representatives from Wisconsin's 1st congressional district March 4, 1883 – March 3, 1885	Succeeded by Lucien B. Caswell
Political offices
Preceded by Alexander Richardson	Mayor of Janesville, Wisconsin; April 1885 – April 1889	Succeeded by James W. St. John
