= Senator Burdick =

Senator Burdick may refer to:

== Members of the United States Senate ==
- Jocelyn Burdick (1922–2019), U.S. Senator from North Dakota in 1992
- Quentin Burdick (1908–1992), U.S. Senator from North Dakota from 1960 to 1992

== United States state senate members ==
- Clark Burdick (1868–1948), Rhode Island State Senate
- Ginny Burdick (born 1947), Oregon State Senate
- Theodore Weld Burdick (1836–1898), Iowa State Senate
- Zebulon P. Burdick (1806–1892), Wisconsin State Senate
