= Senator Woodman =

Senator Woodman may refer to:

- Edwin E. Woodman (1838–1912), Wisconsin State Senate
- William W. Woodman (1818–1901), Wisconsin State Senate
