= Senator Randall =

Senator Randall may refer to:

- Archibald N. Randall (1830–1916), Wisconsin State Senate
- Benjamin Randall (Maine politician) (1789–1859), Maine State Senate
- Charles S. Randall (1824–1904), Massachusetts State Senate
- Emily Randall (fl. 2010s), Washington State Senate
- Samuel J. Randall (1828–1890), Pennsylvania State Senate

== See also ==
- Rodger Randle (born 1943), Oklahoma State Senate
