= Ezra Foot =

American politician (1809–1885)

1st Mayor of La Cygne, Kansas
- In office August 1870 – April 1871
- Succeeded by: Henry Dellinger

Member of the Wisconsin Senate from the 17th district
- In office January 7, 1861 – January 5, 1863
- Preceded by: Zebulon P. Burdick
- Succeeded by: William A. Lawrence

Member of the Wisconsin State Assembly from the Rock 4th district
- In office January 5, 1857 – January 4, 1858
- Preceded by: John M. Evans
- Succeeded by: Zebulon P. Burdick

Personal details
- Born: Ezra Albert Foot; February 6, 1809 Goshen, Connecticut, U.S.
- Died: December 21, 1885 (aged 76) Footville, Wisconsin, U.S.
- Resting place: Grove Cemetery, Footville, Wisconsin, U.S.
- Party: Republican; Whig (before 1854)
- Spouse: Clarissa Beach (m. 1829)
- Children: 3
- Occupation: Farmer; politician

Ezra Albert Foot (February 6, 1809 – December 21, 1885) was an American farmer, warehouse operator, Republican politician, and Wisconsin pioneer. He was the founder and namesake of the village of Footville, in Rock County; he served two years in the Wisconsin Senate (1861, 1862), and one year in the Wisconsin State Assembly (1857), representing western Rock County. Before Wisconsin statehood, he also represented Rock County as a delegate to Wisconsin's second constitutional convention—which produced the Constitution of Wisconsin. He also briefly resided in Kansas in the early 1870s, and was elected the first mayor of La Cygne, Kansas.

== Early life ==
Ezra Albert Foot was born on February 6, 1809, in Goshen, Connecticut, as the sixth of at least seven children born to Abigail (née Baldwin) and Joseph Foote Jr. The Foot family were descendants of the English colonist Nathaniel Foote Sr. (1592–1644), one of the original settlers of Wethersfield, Connecticut.

== Career ==
In 1843 or 1845, Foot moved to Bachelor's Grove (later Footville) in Rock County, Wisconsin. In 1846, he ran for the first constitutional convention for the Constitution of Wisconsin, but lost. In 1847, he was elected to the second constitutional convention in Wisconsin. Foot was a member of the Wisconsin State Assembly in 1857. He was a member of the Wisconsin Senate, representing Wisconsin's 17th Senate district, as a Republican for the 1861 and 1862 terms. He was a trustee of the State Hospital for the Insane for several years. He was the founder and namesake of Footville. He was instrumental in having a railroad built in Footville and he was president of the board of trustees of the Evansville Cemetery.

He began operating warehouses along the railroad line, at one time maintaining seven warehouses between Wisconsin and Kansas. In 1869, he sold most of his warehouses and moved to La Cygne, Kansas. La Cygne was incorporated as a city the following year, and Foot was elected the first mayor of the city in August 1870; he also served as probate judge. In March 1876, he returned to Footville, Wisconsin. He was a member of the county board of supervisors in Rock County and served as chair of the body for three years. In 1885 and at the time of his death, he was justice of the peace in Footville.

== Personal life ==
Foot married Clarissa Beach in 1829 in Connecticut; they had three children together, Ruth Roxana, Mrs. E. H. Egerton, and Joseph I. In 1847, his family moved into a grout house in Footville. During the American Civil War, their son Joseph was chaplain of the 13th Wisconsin Infantry Regiment.

Foot died on December 21, 1885, at his home in Footville. He was buried at Grove Cemetery in Footville.
