= 8th Wisconsin Infantry Regiment =

Union Army infantry regiment

- Flag of Wisconsin
- Active: September 13, 1861 – September 5, 1865
- Country: United States
- Allegiance: Union
- Branch: Infantry
- Size: Regiment
- Engagements: Battle of Iuka; Second Battle of Corinth; Siege of Vicksburg; Red River Campaign; Battle of Nashville

Commanders
- Colonel: Robert C. Murphy
- Colonel: George W. Robbins
- Colonel: John W. Jefferson
- Colonel: William B. Britton

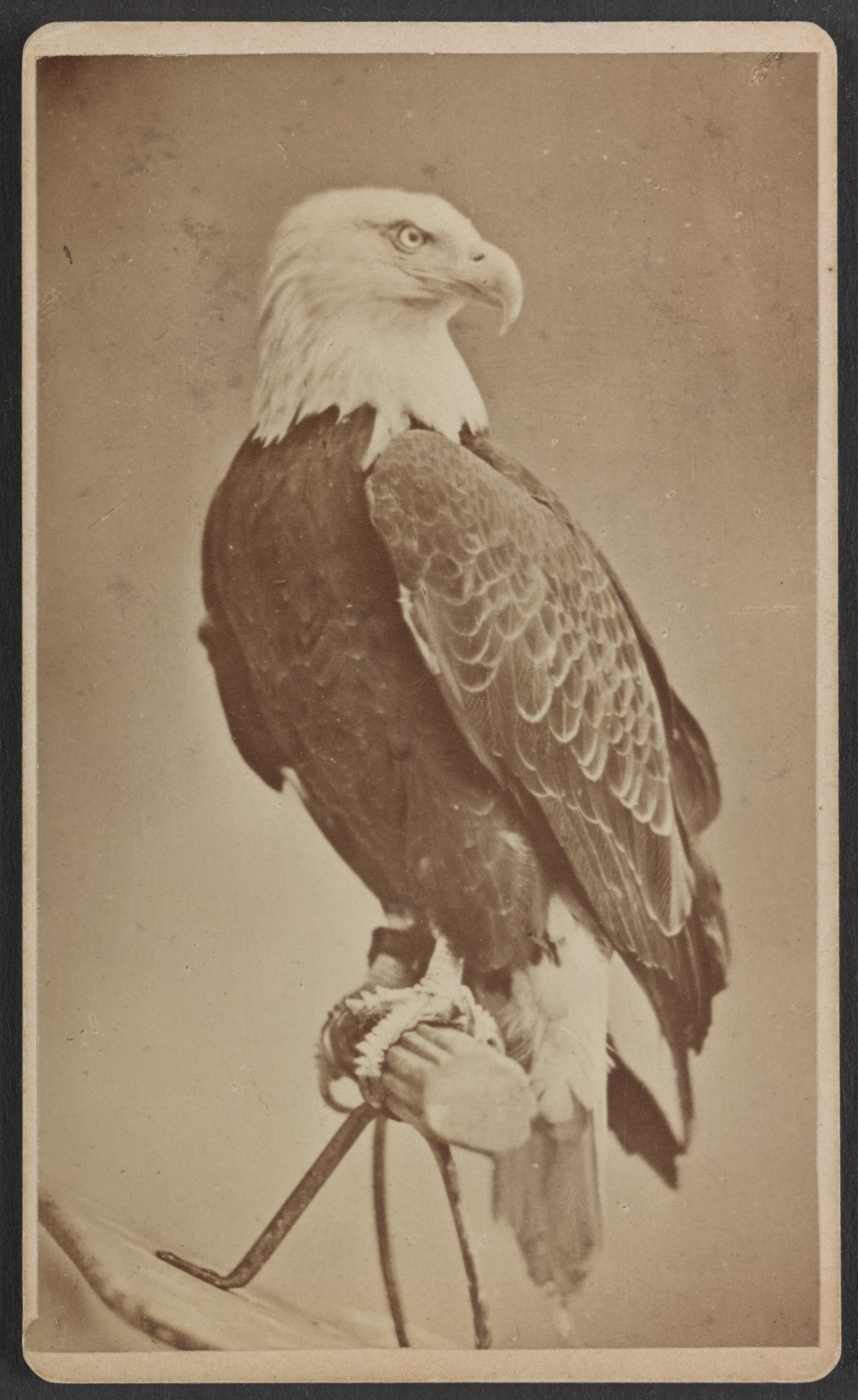
Old Abe, the live war eagle of Wisconsin, 1876. From the Liljenquist Family Collection of Civil War Photographs, Prints and Photographs Division, Library of Congress

The 8th Wisconsin Infantry Regiment was a volunteer infantry regiment that served in the Union Army during the American Civil War. They served in the western theater of the war, most notably in the Vicksburg campaign. The 8th Wisconsin Infantry was probably most famous for their military mascot, Old Abe, a bald eagle that accompanied the regiment into battle; Old Abe's legacy lives on through its likeness utilized in the 101st Airborne Division unit patch.

== Service ==
The 8th Wisconsin was raised at Madison, Wisconsin, and mustered into Federal service September 13, 1861.

The regiment was mustered out on September 5, 1865, at Demopolis, Alabama.

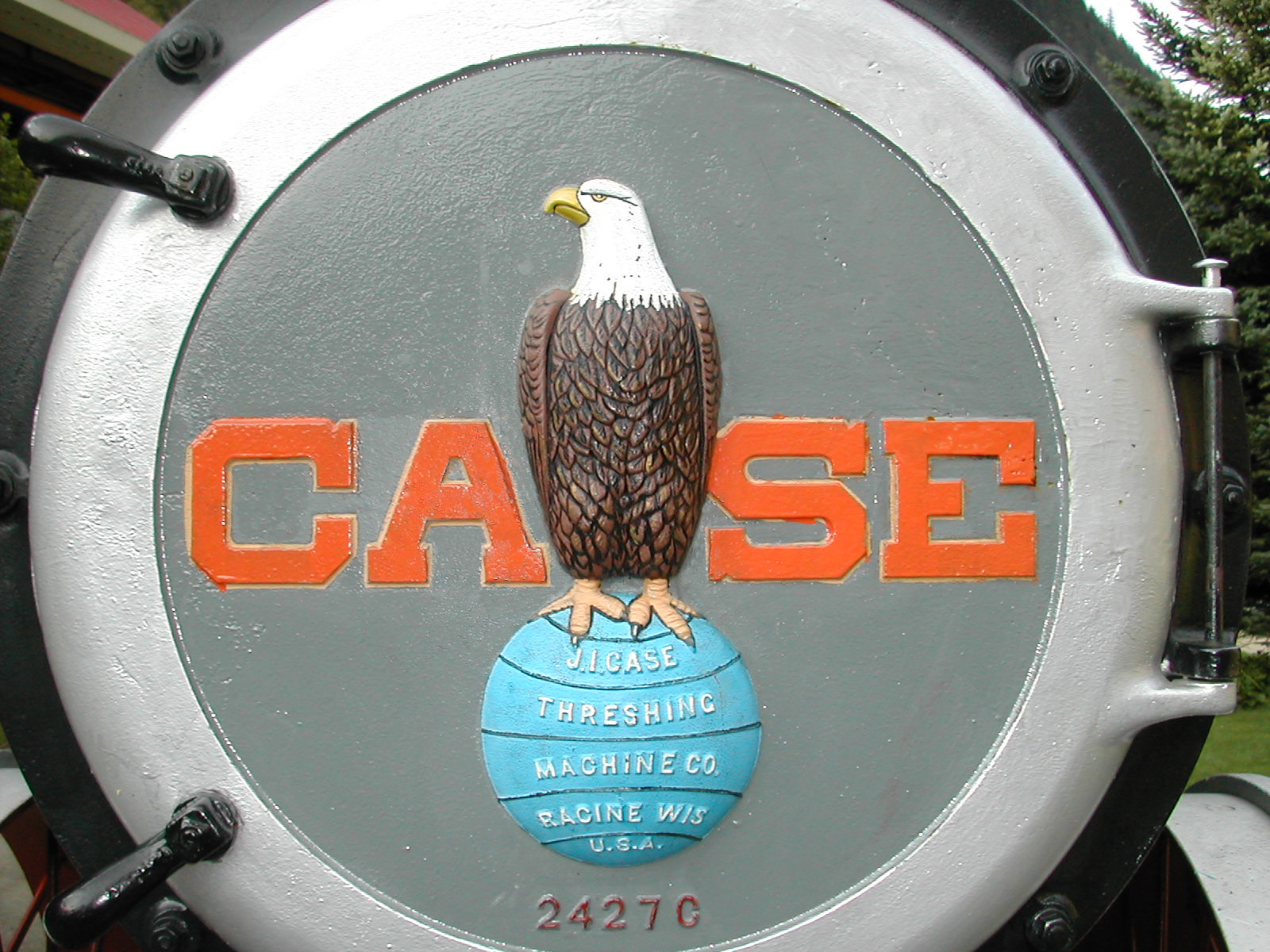
Jerome Case chose the eagle mascot as the trademark of Case Corporation

=== Battles ===
The 8th Wisconsin Infantry along with their mascot Old Abe The War Eagle attended numerous battles and lesser engagements during the war:

- Fredericktown, Missouri - 21 October 1861
- New Madrid and *Island #10 - March & April 1862 Union General John Pope captures Point Pleasant, Missouri, and provokes Confederates to evacuate New Madrid. The Confederates abandon arms and provisions, valued at one million dollars, during their escape across the Mississippi River to the eastern bank and to Island No. 10.
- Point Pleasant, Missouri - 20 March 1862
- Farmington, Mississippi. - 9 May 1862
- Corinth, Mississippi. - 28 May 1862
- Iuka, Mississippi. - 12 September 1862
- Burnsville, Mississippi. - 13 September 1862
- Iuka, Mississippi. - 16–18 September 1862
- Corinth, Mississippi. - 3–4 October 1862
- Tallahatchie, Mississippi. - 2 December 1862
- Mississippi Springs, Mississippi. - 13 May 1863
- Jackson, Mississippi. - 14 May 1863
- Assault on Vicksburg, Mississippi. - 22 May 1863
- Mechanicsburg, Mississippi. - 4 June 1863
- Richmond, Louisiana. - 15 June 1863
- Vicksburg, Mississippi. - 24 June 1863
- Surrender of Vicksburg- 4 July 1863
- Brownsville, Mississippi. - 14 October 1863
- Meridian campaign, Mississippi. - February 3 - March 6, 1864
- Fort Scurry, Louisiana. - 13 March 1864
- Fort DeRussy, Louisiana. - 15 March 1864
- Henderson's Hill, Louisiana. - 21 March 1864
- Grand Ecore, Louisiana. - 2 April 1864
- Pleasant Hill, Louisiana. - 8–9 April 1864
- Natchitoches, Louisiana. - 20 April 1864
- Kane River, Louisiana. - 22 April 1864
- Clouterville and Crane Hill, Louisiana. - 23 April 1864
- Bayou Rapids, Louisiana. - 2 May 1864
- Bayou La Monre, Louisiana. - 3 May 1864
- Bayou Roberts, Louisiana. - 4–6 May 1864
- Moore's Plantation, Louisiana. - 8–12 May 1864
- Mansura, Louisiana. - 16 May 1864
- Battle of Maysville, Louisiana. - 17 May 1864
- Calhoun's Plantation, Louisiana. - 18 May 1864
- Bayou De Glaise, Louisiana. - 18 May 1864
- Lake Chicot, Arkansas. - 6 June 1864
- Hurricane Creek, Mississippi. - 13 August 1864
- Pursuit of Price, Jackass Cavalry September - October 1864
- Nashville, Tennessee. - 15–16 December 1864
- The Mobile Campaign March - April 1865

== Commanders ==
- Colonel Robert C. Murphy (July 11, 1861 – January 10, 1863) was dismissed after failing to properly safeguard supplies on two separate occasions.
- Colonel George W. Robbins (December 20, 1862 – September 1, 1863) was previously lieutenant colonel of the regiment. He was wounded at the Second Battle of Corinth
- Colonel John W. Jefferson (September 1, 1863 – October 11, 1864) was a grandson of U.S. President Thomas Jefferson and Sally Hemings. He began the war as major of the regiment and was promoted to lieutenant colonel before becoming officially promoted to colonel on June 7, 1864. He was wounded twice and mustered out at the end of his three years of service.
- Colonel William B. Britton (October 11, 1864 – September 5, 1865) began the war as captain of Co. G, and was then promoted to major and lieutenant colonel. He was officially promoted to colonel on March 8, 1865. Wounded at the Battle of Nashville, he mustered out with the regiment. After the war he served in the Wisconsin State Assembly.

== Total enlistments and casualties ==
The 8th Wisconsin initially mustered 870 men and later recruited an additional 333 men, for a total of 1,203 men. The regiment lost 2 officers and 53 enlisted men killed in action or who later died of their wounds, plus another 2 officers and 219 enlisted men who died of disease, for a total of 280 fatalities.

8th Wisconsin Infantry, Company Organization
Company	Original Moniker	Primary Place of Recruitment	Captain(s)
A	Waupuca Union Rifles	Waupaca County	Josiah B. Redfield (wounded–mustered out); Charles Christiansen (mustered out)
B	Sheboygan County Indepdendents	Sheboygan County	David B. Conger (resigned); Albert E. Smith (mustered out); Charles P. Stewart (mustered out)
C	Eau Claire Eagles	Eau Claire County	John E. Perkins (DOW); Victor Wolf (discharged); Thomas G. Butler (acting–mustered out)
D	Fox Lake Volunteer Rifles	Columbia County, Dodge County, and Pierce County	William J. Dawes (POW–discharged); Benjamin S. Williams (mustered out)
E	Rough and Ready Guards	Dane County	William C. Young (promoted); Jacob Leffler (mustered out)
F	Carwford County Volunteers	Crawford County, Vernon County, and Sheboygan County	James H. Green (mustered out); John W. Greenman (acting–mustered out)
G	Janesville Fire Zouaves	Rock County	William B. Britton (promoted); Charles P. King (wounded–mustered out); Milton H. Doty (acting–mustered out)
H	Sugar River Rifles	Dane County and Green County	Stephen Estee (KIA); Peter B. Willoughby (mustered out)
I	La Crosse County Rifles	Washington County, La Crosse County, and Trempealeau County	Milo M. Baker (resigned); Alonzo D. Hickok (resigned); Duncan A. Kennedy (mustered out); Samuel J. Sargent (acting–mustered out)
K	Racine County Volunteers	Racine County and Dane County	William P. Lyon (transferred); James O. Bartlett (promoted); Theodore A. Fellows (mustered out)

== Notable members ==
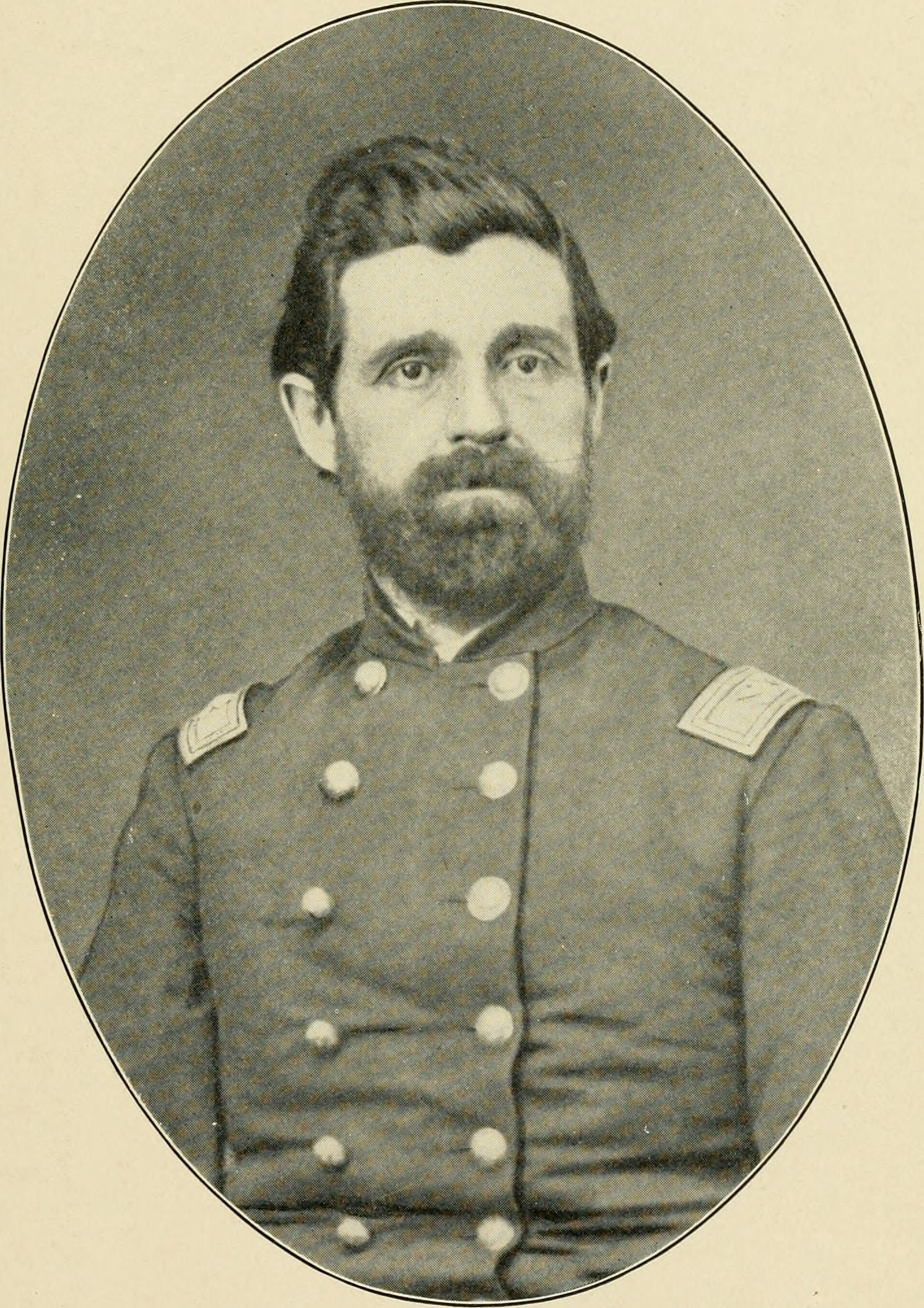
William P. Lyon
- Thomas J. Bowles was a private in Co. D in 1864 and 1865. After the war he served in the Wisconsin State Assembly.
- Augustus G. Weissert was enlisted in Co. K and was promoted to sergeant major of the regiment. After the war he became the 21st Commander-in-Chief of the Grand Army of the Republic (1892–1893).
- William P. Lyon was captain of Co. K for the first year, and was then promoted to colonel of the 13th Wisconsin Infantry Regiment. He received an honorary brevet to brigadier general and after the war became the 12th Speaker of the Wisconsin State Assembly and the 7th Chief Justice of the Wisconsin Supreme Court.
- George Washington Glover Jr., the only son of Mary Baker Eddy, was a private in Co. I through nearly the entire war. He was wounded at Corinth.
- Ezra T. Sprague was adjutant of the regiment for nearly three years. Prior to joining the 8th Wisconsin, he was enlisted in Co. K of the 1st Wisconsin Infantry Regiment. Afterward, he was colonel of the 42nd Wisconsin Infantry Regiment. He received an honorary brevet to brigadier general and later served as a Wisconsin circuit judge.

== See also ==
- List of Wisconsin Civil War units
- Wisconsin in the American Civil War
