= Pliny Norcross =

American politician (1838-1915)

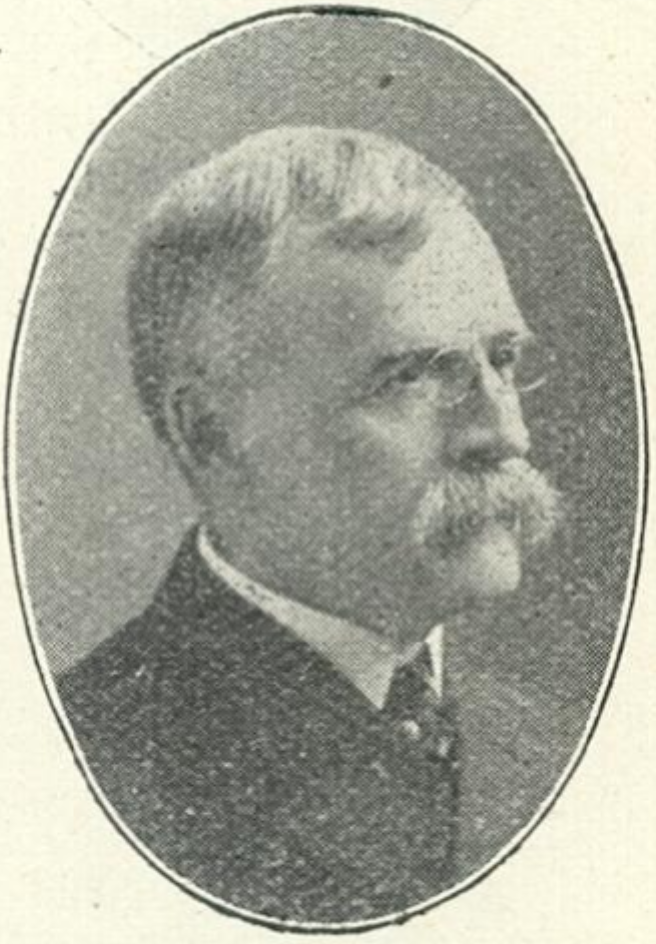
- Portrait from the 1907 Wisconsin Blue Book

Member of the Wisconsin State Assembly from the Rock 2nd district
- In office January 2, 1905 – January 4, 1909
- Preceded by: Charles L. Valentine
- Succeeded by: Grant U. Fisher
- In office January 5, 1885 – January 3, 1887
- Preceded by: William B. Britton
- Succeeded by: John Winans

20th Mayor of Janesville, Wisconsin
- In office April 1877 – April 1879
- Preceded by: James W. St. John
- Succeeded by: Samuel C. Cobb

District Attorney of Rock County, Wisconsin
- In office January 1, 1871 – January 1, 1875
- Preceded by: Henry A. Patterson
- Succeeded by: John W. Sale

Member of the Wisconsin State Assembly from the Rock 5th district
- In office January 7, 1867 – January 6, 1868
- Preceded by: Allen C. Bates
- Succeeded by: Alexander M. Thomson

Personal details
- Born: November 16, 1838 Templeton, Mass., U.S.
- Died: July 11, 1915 (aged 76) Janesville, Wisconsin, U.S.
- Cause of death: Drowning
- Resting place: Oak Hill Cemetery, Janesville
- Party: Republican; Natl. Union (1860s)
- Spouses: Phoebe Akin Poole (m. 1865; died 1900); Frances E. Spaulding (m. 1902–1915)
- Children: Frederick Franklin Norcross^{(b. 1865; died 1938)}; John Vanderpoole Norcross^{(b. 1867; died 1940)}; Elizabeth Leavitt (Mason)^{(b. 1875; died 1952)}; Edward Powers Norcross^{(b. 1878; died 1942)}
- Education: University of Wisconsin
- Profession: Lawyer

Military service
- Allegiance: United States
- Branch/service: United States Volunteers; Union Army
- Rank: Captain, USV
- Unit: 1st Reg. Wis. Vol. Infantry; 13th Reg. Wis. Vol. Infantry
- Battles/wars: American Civil War

Pliny Norcross (November 16, 1838 – July 11, 1915) was an American lawyer, businessman, and Republican politician from Janesville, Wisconsin. He was the 20th mayor of Janesville, and an important character in the development of the city—responsible for the first electric power-generating plants in the city. He represented Rock County in the Wisconsin State Assembly for four terms spread across the 1860s, 1880s, and 1900s, and served four years as district attorney. Earlier in life, he served as an officer in the Union Army through most of the American Civil War and was described as the first University of Wisconsin student to volunteer for the war.

== Early life and war service ==
Pliny Norcross was born in Templeton, Massachusetts. He moved west with his parents in 1852, settling on a farm in the town of La Grange, Walworth County, Wisconsin. In Wisconsin, he attended the Milton Academy for two years, then went to the University of Wisconsin.

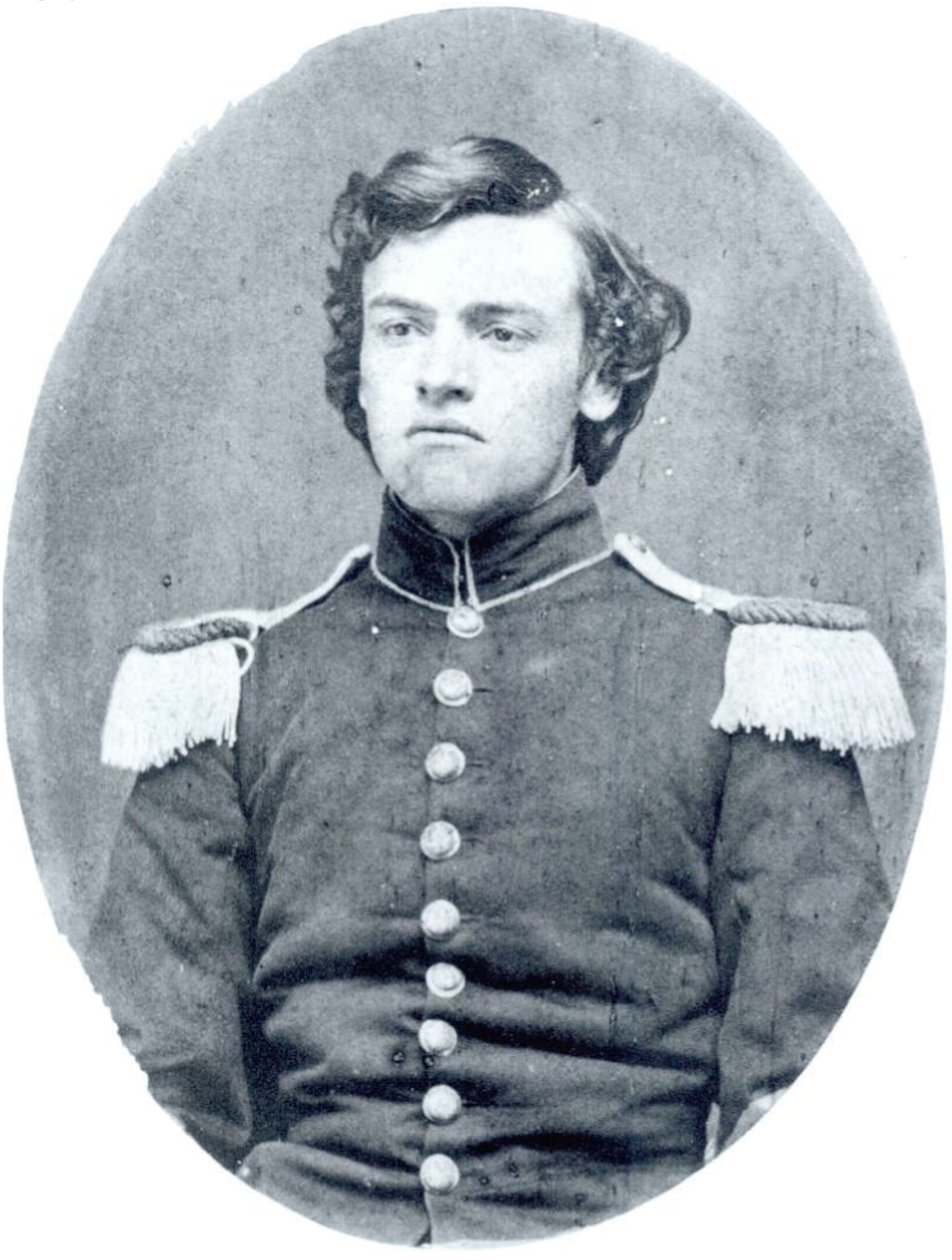
Photo ca. 1861

He left school due to the outbreak of the American Civil War and joined up with the "Governor's Guard"—a Madison-based militia company headed by captain Lucius Fairchild. He was described as the first University of Wisconsin student to volunteer for the war.

The "Governor's Guard" was enrolled as Company K in the 1st Wisconsin Infantry Regiment, and went to the front in Virginia. They participated in the Battle of Hoke's Run in July 1861, and Norcross was promoted to corporal, but their three-month enlistment expired a short time later.

Norcross chose to re-enlist for a three-year term, and was commissioned captain of Company K in the 13th Wisconsin Infantry Regiment. He served the full three years as captain of his company and did not re-enlist again as a veteran in 1864. With the 13th Wisconsin Infantry, he participated in many of the important battles of the western theater of the war, including the Iuka–Corinth campaign and the critical Vicksburg campaign.

== Legal and political career ==
After returning from the war, Norcross settled in Janesville, Wisconsin, and became a junior law partner to Judge John R. Bennett. He subsequently partnered with A. A. Jackson, and then Benjamin F. Dunwiddie.

Shortly after moving to Janesville, he became active in the Republican Party of Wisconsin, which was then styling itself as the National Union Party, due to the politics of the Civil War. He was elected to his first term in the Wisconsin State Assembly in 1866. He represented Rock County's 5th Assembly district, which then comprised just the city of Janesville.

Running on the Republican ticket, he was elected district attorney of Rock County in 1870 and 1872, and was then elected city attorney of Janesville in 1875 and 1876, and mayor in 1877 and 1878.

Norcross retired from the profession of law in 1883 and switched to commercial pursuits. He went east to Brooklyn, New York, where he became a founder of International Tile Co. After constructing the factory, however, he quickly sold his stake in the company and returned to Janesville.

Back in Janesville, he was elected to his second term in the Wisconsin State Assembly in 1884, then representing Rock County's 2nd Assembly district, comprising Janesville and two neighboring towns.

Around this same time, he purchased land and erected two large buildings, known as the Norcross Block and the Phoebus Block. He also purchased a mill located in the city and moved it to a different location on the river, where he leased it out. In place of that mill, he built the first electric lighting plant in Janesville, utilizing water power. He went on to convert another three such mills to providing electrical power, which were utilized to power street lamps in Janesville and Edgerton. Ultimately, Norcross sold all of his power-generating plants to the Janesville Electric Company in 1899.

In 1904, he was elected commander of the Wisconsin department of the Grand Army of the Republic veterans organization. Later that year, he was elected again to the Assembly, again representing Rock County's 2nd Assembly district, which by then comprised Janesville and a swathe of the eastern half of the county. He was re-elected with only 3rd party opposition in 1906. During the 1907 session of the Legislature, Norcross was appointed to the University of Wisconsin Board of Regents by Governor James O. Davidson. He served three years on the board of regents before resigning in 1910, when he largely retired from public life.

== Personal life and legacy ==
Pliny Norcross was the second of five children born to Franklin and Lydia (née Powers) Norcross. His older brother, Lanson, and younger brother, Frederick, both served with him in the 13th Wisconsin Infantry Regiment; Frederick died of disease during the last months of the war. His paternal grandfather was Daniel Norcross, who served as a corporal in a minutemen company during the American Revolutionary War. The Norcross family were descended from Jeremiah Norcross, a pioneer settler who came to the Massachusetts Bay Colony from England in 1636.

On January 4, 1865, Norcross married Phoebe Akin Poole of Beloit, Wisconsin. They had four children and were married for 35 years before her death in 1900. Two years later, Norcross married Frances E. Reddington (née Spaulding), a widow who grew up in Janesville, but had lived for several years in Troy, Pennsylvania, during her previous marriage. Norcross' two eldest sons became lawyers, his daughter married a lawyer, and his youngest son became a medical doctor.

Norcross was also noteworthy for the part he played in the career of Lavinia Goodell, the first woman admitted to the State Bar of Wisconsin. Norcross had encouraged her studies and then sponsored her application to take the bar exam in 1874.

In his later years, Norcross lived most of the year in a home he owned in Orlando, Florida, but made frequent visits back to Wisconsin. During one such visit, in Summer 1915, he went missing after dinner and was found to have fallen into the Rock River and drowned.

Norcross's Phoebus Block in Janesville is still standing and operating as a commercial property; its current address is 23–25 West Milwaukee Street.

== Electoral history ==
=== Wisconsin Assembly (1884) ===
Wisconsin Assembly, Rock 2nd District Election, 1884
Party	Candidate	Votes	%	±%
General Election, November 4, 1884
Republican	Pliny Norcross	1,527	56.10%	+7.71%
Democratic	Alexander Richardson	1,195	43.90%	−3.13%
Plurality		586	12.20%	+10.84%
Total votes		2,722	100.0%	+23.45%
Republican hold				

=== Wisconsin Assembly (1904, 1906) ===
Wisconsin Assembly, Rock 2nd District Election, 1904
Party	Candidate	Votes	%	±%
General Election, November 8, 1904
Republican	Pliny Norcross	1,687	53.35%	−3.29%
Democratic	James W. St. John	1,296	40.99%	+0.49%
Social Democratic	T. J. McKligne	179	5.66%	
Plurality		391	12.37%	-3.77%
Total votes		3,162	100.0%	+17.59%
Republican hold				

Wisconsin Assembly, Rock 2nd District Election, 1906
Party	Candidate	Votes	%	±%
General Election, November 2, 1906
Republican	Pliny Norcross (incumbent)	1,069	94.94%	
Social Democratic	John R. Horn	57	5.06%	
Plurality		1,012	89.88%	+77.51%
Total votes		1,126	100.0%	-64.39%
Republican hold				

Wisconsin State Assembly
Preceded by Allen C. Bates	Member of the Wisconsin State Assembly from the Rock 5th district January 7, 1867 – January 6, 1868	Succeeded by Alexander M. Thomson
Preceded by William B. Britton	Member of the Wisconsin State Assembly from the Rock 2nd district January 5, 1885 – January 3, 1887	Succeeded by John Winans
Preceded by Charles L. Valentine	Member of the Wisconsin State Assembly from the Rock 2nd district January 2, 1905 – January 4, 1909	Succeeded by Grant U. Fisher
Political offices
Preceded by James W. St. John	Mayor of Janesville, Wisconsin; April 1877 – April 1879	Succeeded by Samuel C. Cobb
Legal offices
Preceded by Henry A. Patterson	District Attorney of Rock County, Wisconsin; January 1, 1871 – January 1, 1875	Succeeded by John W. Sale
