= S. J. Todd =

American politician (1821–1902)

Member of the Wisconsin Senate from the 17th district
- In office January 7, 1867 – January 4, 1869
- Preceded by: William A. Lawrence
- Succeeded by: Charles G. Williams

3rd Mayor of Beloit, Wisconsin
- In office April 1859 – April 1860
- Preceded by: Anson P. Waterman
- Succeeded by: John Bannister

Personal details
- Born: Samuel J. Todd; January 19, 1821 Preble, New York, U.S.
- Died: January 9, 1902 (aged 80) Beloit, Wisconsin, U.S.
- Cause of death: Stroke
- Resting place: Oakwood Cemetery, Beloit, Wisconsin
- Party: Republican; Natl. Union (1865–1868)
- Spouse: Mary E. Hazard (m. 1853)
- Children: Mary A. Todd^{(b. 1859; died 1861)}; Robert H. Todd^{(b. 1862; died 1907)}; Alice C. Todd^{(b. 1863; died 1898)}; Anne C. Todd^{(b. 1867; died 1897)}; Elizabeth (Eldred)^{(b. 1869; died 1925)}
- Relatives: Samuel Taggart (grandfather)
- Occupation: lawyer, politician

Samuel James Todd (January 19, 1821 – January 9, 1902) was an American lawyer, Republican politician, and Wisconsin pioneer. He was an early settler of Beloit, Wisconsin, and was the 3rd mayor of Beloit. He also represented Rock County in the Wisconsin Senate for the 1867 and 1868 sessions. His name is often abbreviated as S. J. Todd in historical documents.

== Biography ==
Todd was born on January 19, 1821, in Preble, New York, his father died when he was about five years old. He studied law at Batavia, New York, and was admitted to the bar.

In 1850, he moved west and settled at Beloit, Wisconsin—then a small village. He formed a law partnership with John M. Keep, which continued until Keep was appointed a Wisconsin circuit court judge in 1857. Todd was one of the leading lawyers of Beloit for 30 years.

In 1857, Todd was one of three respected lawyers chosen by Governor Coles Bashford for a commission to revise and compile the statutes of Wisconsin, based on changes in the law since the previous edition. He was partnered with David Taylor and Frederick S. Lovell. The revised statutes were published in 1858, and later that year Todd was elected to a one-year term as Mayor of Beloit.

In 1866, Todd was elected to the Wisconsin State Senate, representing all of Rock County in what was then the 17th State Senate district. He ran on the National Union Party ticket, but was identified with the Radical Republican faction of the time. In the Senate, he served on the committee on incorporations in 1867, and served on judiciary, state affairs, and military affairs in 1868.

After leaving the Senate, he served as city attorney of Beloit from 1870 to 1874, and was a member of the school board from 1875 through 1885.

He suffered a stroke on January 7, 1902, and died two days later at his home in Beloit.

== Personal life and family ==
Samuel Todd was the only known child of Daniel Todd and his wife Mary (née Taggart). After his father's death, in 1826, his mother remarried with Daniel's younger brother John Todd and had two more children. Todd's ancestors were Scotch-Irish Americans, but both parents were born in America. His maternal grandfather was Samuel Taggart, who represented Massachusetts in the U.S. House of Representatives for seven terms, from 1803 to 1817.

He married Ms. Mary (or May) E. Hazard, of Essex County, New York, on December 21, 1853. They had five children together, though one daughter died in infancy. At the time of his death, only two of his children were still living.

Wisconsin Senate
Preceded by William A. Lawrence	Member of the Wisconsin Senate from the 17th district January 7, 1867 – January 4, 1869	Succeeded by Charles G. Williams
Political offices
Preceded by Anson P. Waterman	Mayor of Beloit, Wisconsin; April 1859 – April 1860	Succeeded by John Bannister
