= 1st Wisconsin Infantry Regiment =

Union Army infantry regiment

- Flag of Wisconsin
- Active: April 16, 1861 – August 22, 1861; October 19, 1861 – October 13, 1864
- Country: United States
- Allegiance: Union
- Branch: Infantry
- Size: Regiment
- Engagements: American Civil War: Battle of Hoke's Run; Battle of Perryville; Battle of Stone's River; Tullahoma Campaign; Battle of Chickamauga; Siege of Chattanooga; Atlanta campaign; Battle of Kennesaw Mountain

Commanders
- Colonel: John C. Starkweather
- Lt. Colonel: George B. Bingham

The 1st Wisconsin Infantry Regiment was a volunteer infantry regiment in the Union Army during the American Civil War. The regiment was originally raised as for a three-month term under President Lincoln's April 1861 call for 75,000 volunteers, and served briefly in the eastern theater during that enlistment. After the three-month term expired, however, the regiment was re-established for a three-year term and spent most of the remainder of its service in the western theater of the war, serving in many of the major battles in Tennessee, Kentucky, and Georgia.

== Service ==
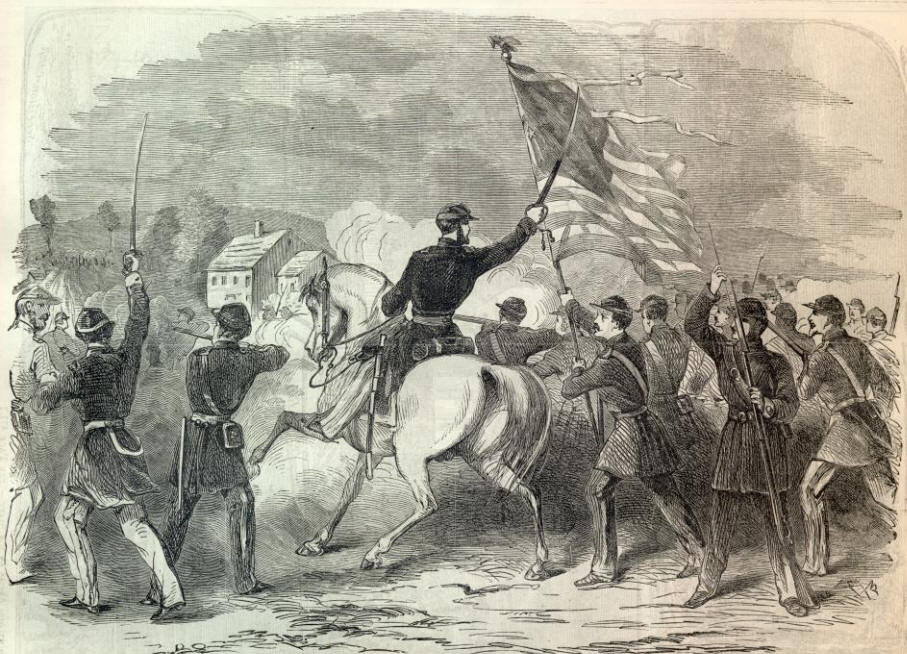
Sketch of Col. John C. Starkweather leading the 1st Wisconsin Infantry at the Battle of Hoke's Run, July 1861.

The original 1st Regiment Wisconsin was raised at Milwaukee, Wisconsin, on April 16, 1861, and mustered into Federal service May 17, 1861. The regiment was moved to Harrisburg, Pennsylvania, on June 9. It was assigned to Abercrombie's 6th Brigade of Negley's 2nd Division, Patterson's Army. It spent its service guarding the upper Potomac River crossings. Its only engagement was at the Hoke's Run on July 2. The regiment was mustered out on August 22, 1861.

The regiment was reorganized with new 3-year enlistees by Colonel Starkweather at Milwaukee and was mustered into federal service on October 19, 1861. The regiment was mustered out on October 13, 1864.

== Total enlistments and casualties ==
The 1st Wisconsin Infantry initially mustered 810 men and added no recruits. In its initial 3 months of service, it lost 2 men killed in action or mortally wounded, and one killed accidentally for a total of three fatalities, a death rate of 0.37 percent. One of the fatalities was Second Sergeant of Company B, Warren M Graham, 18 years old, of Milwaukee, Wisconsin.

When reorganized for 3 years of service, the regiment mustered 945 men and later recruited an additional 563 men, for a total of 1508 men. The regiment suffered 6 officers and 151 enlisted men killed in action or who later died of their wounds, plus another 1 officer and 142 enlisted men who died of disease, for a total of 300 fatalities.

1st Wisconsin Infantry, 3-Month Company Organization
Company	Original Moniker	Primary Place of Recruitment	Captain(s)
A	Milwaukee Light Guards	Milwaukee and Milwaukee County	George B. Bingham (mustered out)
B	Milwaukee Union Rifles	Milwaukee and Milwaukee County	Henry A. Mitchell (mustered out)
C	Horicon Guards	Horicon and Dodge County	Orestes B. Twogood (mustered out)
D	Black Yagers (Jäger)	Milwaukee and Milwaukee County	Pius Dreher (mustered out)
E	Madison Guards	Madison and Dane County	George E. Bryant (mustered out)
F	Beloit City Guards	Beloit and Rock County	William M. Clark (mustered out)
G	Park City Greys	Kenosha and Kenosha County	Donald C. McVean (mustered out)
H	Milwaukee Riflemen	Milwaukee and Milwaukee County	Willhelm Georg (mustered out)
I	Fond du Lac Badgers	Fond du Lac and Fond du Lac County	James V. McCall (mustered out)
K	Governor's Guards	Madison and Dane County	Lucius Fairchild (transferred)

1st Wisconsin Infantry, 3-Year Company Organization
Company	Captain(s)
A	John C. Goodrich (mustered out)
B	Henry A. Mitchell (promoted); John M. Cosgrove (mustered out)
C	Robert Hill (resigned); Hiram A. Sheldon (mustered out)
D	Henry A. Starr (transferred); William S. Mitchell (KIA); Charles H. Messenger (mustered out)
E	Donald C. McVean (wounded–POW); Benjamin F. Teets (mustered out)
F	Maurice M. Samuels (mustered out)
G	Edward Bloodgood (resigned); William H. Wilson (mustered out)
H	Eugene Cary (resigned); John McMullen (mustered out)
I	Oran Rogers (resigned); Abner O. Heald (KIA); George W. Buffum (acting–mustered out)
K	Thomas H. Green (promoted); Christian Klock (mustered out)

== Commanders ==
- Colonel John C. Starkweather (April 16, 1861 – July 17, 1863) was wounded at Chickamauga then promoted to brigadier general and assigned to command a series of outposts in the western theater. During that time, he served on the court martial that tried U.S. Army Surgeon General William A. Hammond.
- Lt. Colonel George B. Bingham (December 18, 1863 – October 13, 1864) began the war as captain of Co. A, 1st Wisconsin Infantry, and was promoted to major when the regiment was re-established. He was designated for promotion to colonel, but was never mustered at that rank. He mustered out with the regiment in October 1864.

== Notable people ==
- George E. Bryant was captain of Co. E and later colonel of the 12th Wisconsin Infantry Regiment. After the war he served as a brigadier general in the Wisconsin National Guard and served as a Wisconsin state legislator.
- Seth W. Button was a sergeant in Co. F and was later promoted to sergeant major and 2nd lieutenant. He was wounded at Chickamauga and resigned. After the war he became a Wisconsin state legislator, judge, and district attorney.
- Eugene Cary was captain of Co. H. Before the war, he was a judge in Sheboygan County; after the war he served as a judge and state senator in Tennessee, and later was a member of the Chicago city council and candidate for mayor of Chicago.
- Lucius Fairchild was captain of Co. K. He was later colonel of the 2nd Wisconsin Infantry Regiment and brigadier general. After the war he became the 10th Governor of Wisconsin.
- Charles L. Harris was lieutenant colonel of the regiment and was later appointed colonel of the 11th Wisconsin Infantry Regiment. He received an honorary brevet to brigadier general. After the war he served as a Nebraska state senator.
- Judson G. Hart was enlisted in Co. B and later served in the 7th Independent Battery Wisconsin Light Artillery. After the war he became a Wisconsin state legislator.
- Charles H. Larrabee was ensign of Co. C, but was commissioned major of the 5th Wisconsin Infantry Regiment after one month. Later he became colonel of the 24th Wisconsin Infantry Regiment. Before the war, he had served as a U.S. congressman and Wisconsin Supreme Court justice.
- Charles Henry Morgan was a private in Co. I, then sergeant in Co. K, and finally sergeant major in 1862. He was then commissioned second lieutenant of Co. F in the 21st Wisconsin Infantry Regiment. After the war he became a U.S. congressman.
- Pliny Norcross was a corporal in Co. K and later became captain of Co. K in the 13th Wisconsin Infantry Regiment. After the war he became a Wisconsin state legislator and the 20th mayor of Janesville, Wisconsin.
- James Kerr Proudfit was 2nd lieutenant of Co. K and later became colonel of the 12th Wisconsin Infantry Regiment. He received an honorary brevet to brigadier general. After the war he became a Wisconsin state senator.
- John Day Putnam was enlisted in Co. F and later promoted to commissary sergeant for the regiment. After the war he became a Wisconsin state legislator and mayor of River Falls, Wisconsin.
- Florian J. Ries was enlisted in Co. D and later enlisted in the 17th Wisconsin Infantry Regiment, rising to the rank of 1st lieutenant. After the war he became a Wisconsin state legislator.
- Christian Sarnow was 2nd lieutenant of Co. H and later served as a 1st lieutenant in the 26th Wisconsin Infantry Regiment. After the war he became a Wisconsin state legislator.
- Ezra T. Sprague was a sergeant in Co. K during the three months regiment. He went on to serve as adjutant of the 8th Wisconsin Infantry Regiment and was then colonel of the 42nd Wisconsin Infantry Regiment. He received an honorary brevet to brigadier general and later served as a Wisconsin circuit judge.
- Lyman M. Ward was 1st sergeant in Co. I and later became colonel of the 14th Wisconsin Infantry Regiment. He received an honorary brevet to brigadier general. After the war he became a Michigan state legislator.

== See also ==
- List of Wisconsin Civil War units
- Wisconsin in the American Civil War
