= Footville, Wisconsin =

- Village
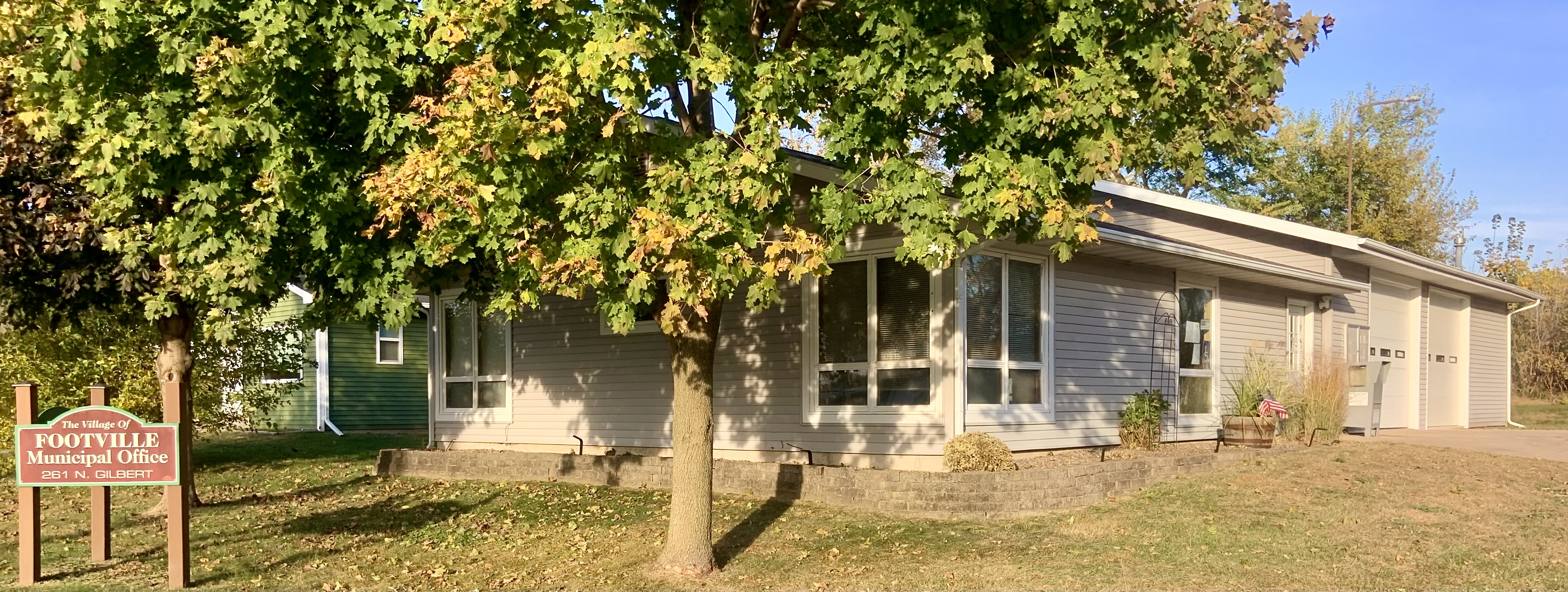
- Village hall

- Location of Footville in Rock County, Wisconsin.
- Coordinates: 42°40′12″N 89°12′32″W
- Country: United States
- State: Wisconsin
- County: Rock

Area
  - Total: 1.12 sq mi (2.91 km^{2})
  - Land: 1.12 sq mi (2.91 km^{2})
  - Water: 0 sq mi (0.00 km^{2})
- Elevation: 830 ft (250 m)

Population (2020)
  - Total: 772
  - Density: 740.5/sq mi (285.91/km^{2})
- Time zone: UTC-6 (Central (CST))
  - Summer (DST): UTC-5 (CDT)
- ZIP Code: 53537
- Area code: 608
- FIPS code: 55-26400
- GNIS feature ID: 1565103
- Website: footvillewi.gov

Footville is a village in Rock County, Wisconsin, United States. The population was 772 at the 2020 census.

== History ==
Footville was originally called Bachelor's Grove. The present name is for Ezra A. Foot, the original owner of the townsite. A post office was established as Bachelor's Grove in 1846 and renamed Footville in 1855.

== Geography ==
According to the United States Census Bureau, the village has a total area of 1.12 square miles (2.90 km^{2}), all land.

== Demographics ==
Historical population
Census	Pop.	Note	%±
1920	351		—
1930	358		2.0%
1940	459		28.2%
1950	562		22.4%
1960	675		20.1%
1970	698		3.4%
1980	794		13.8%
1990	764		−3.8%
2000	788		3.1%
2010	808		2.5%
2020	772		−4.5%
U.S. Decennial Census

=== 2010 census ===
As of the census of 2010, there were 808 people, 299 households, and 208 families living in the village. The population density was 721.4 inhabitants per square mile (278.5/km^{2}). There were 326 housing units at an average density of 291.1 per square mile (112.4/km^{2}). The racial makeup of the village was 98.4% White, 0.1% African American, 0.1% Asian, 0.2% Pacific Islander, 0.5% from other races, and 0.6% from two or more races. Hispanic or Latino of any race were 1.0% of the population.

There were 299 households, of which 33.1% had children under the age of 18 living with them, 51.5% were married couples living together, 12.7% had a female householder with no husband present, 5.4% had a male householder with no wife present, and 30.4% were non-families. 25.8% of all households were made up of individuals, and 7.7% had someone living alone who was 65 years of age or older. The average household size was 2.51 and the average family size was 2.98.

The median age in the village was 42.1 years. 23.1% of residents were under the age of 18; 7.8% were between the ages of 18 and 24; 23.7% were from 25 to 44; 27.5% were from 45 to 64, and 17.9% were 65 years of age or older. The gender makeup of the village was 47.5% male and 52.5% female.

=== 2000 census ===
As of the census of 2000, there were 788 people, 310 households, and 222 families living in the village. The population density was 799.5 people per square mile (307.3/km^{2}). There were 326 housing units at an average density of 330.7 per square mile (127.1/km^{2}). The racial makeup of the village was 98.48% White, 0.25% African American, 0.13% Native American, and 1.14% from two or more races. Hispanic or Latino of any race were 0.13% of the population.

There were 310 households, out of which 33.9% had children under the age of 18 living with them, 55.8% were married couples living together, 11.9% had a female householder with no husband present, and 28.1% were non-families. 23.5% of all households were made up of individuals, and 10.6% had someone living alone who was 65 years of age or older. The average household size was 2.52 and the average family size was 2.97.

In the village, the population was spread out, with 25.0% under the age of 18, 8.9% from 18 to 24, 28.7% from 25 to 44, 23.5% from 45 to 64, and 14.0% who were 65 years of age or older. The median age was 38 years. For every 100 females, there were 94.1 males. For every 100 females age 18 and over, there were 92.5 males.

The median income for a household in the village was $47,768, and the median income for a family was $55,833. Males had a median income of $37,344 versus $26,985 for females. The per capita income for the village was $21,688. About 2.9% of families and 3.5% of the population were below the poverty line, including 3.4% of those under age 18 and 3.3% of those aged 65 or over.

== Notable people ==
- Lynda Barry, award-winning cartoonist, author, and teacher.
- Ezra Foot (1809–1885), Wisconsin state politician and founder of Footville
