= Simon Lord =

American politician

Simon Locke Lord (first name sometimes Simeon; March 8, 1826 – February 17, 1893) was a member of the Wisconsin State Assembly and the Wisconsin State Senate.

== Biography ==
Lord was born in Limington, Maine, in 1826. After graduating from the Jefferson Medical College, Lord moved to Edgerton, Wisconsin, in 1858. During the American Civil War, Lord served with the 13th Wisconsin Volunteer Infantry Regiment and the 32nd Wisconsin Volunteer Infantry Regiment. He served as postmaster of Edgerton. Lord died on February 17, 1893, in Edgerton.

== Political career ==
Lord was elected to the Assembly in 1879. From 1883 to 1886, he represented the 17th district of the Senate as a Republican.
