= La Prairie, Wisconsin =

Town of La Prairie
- Town
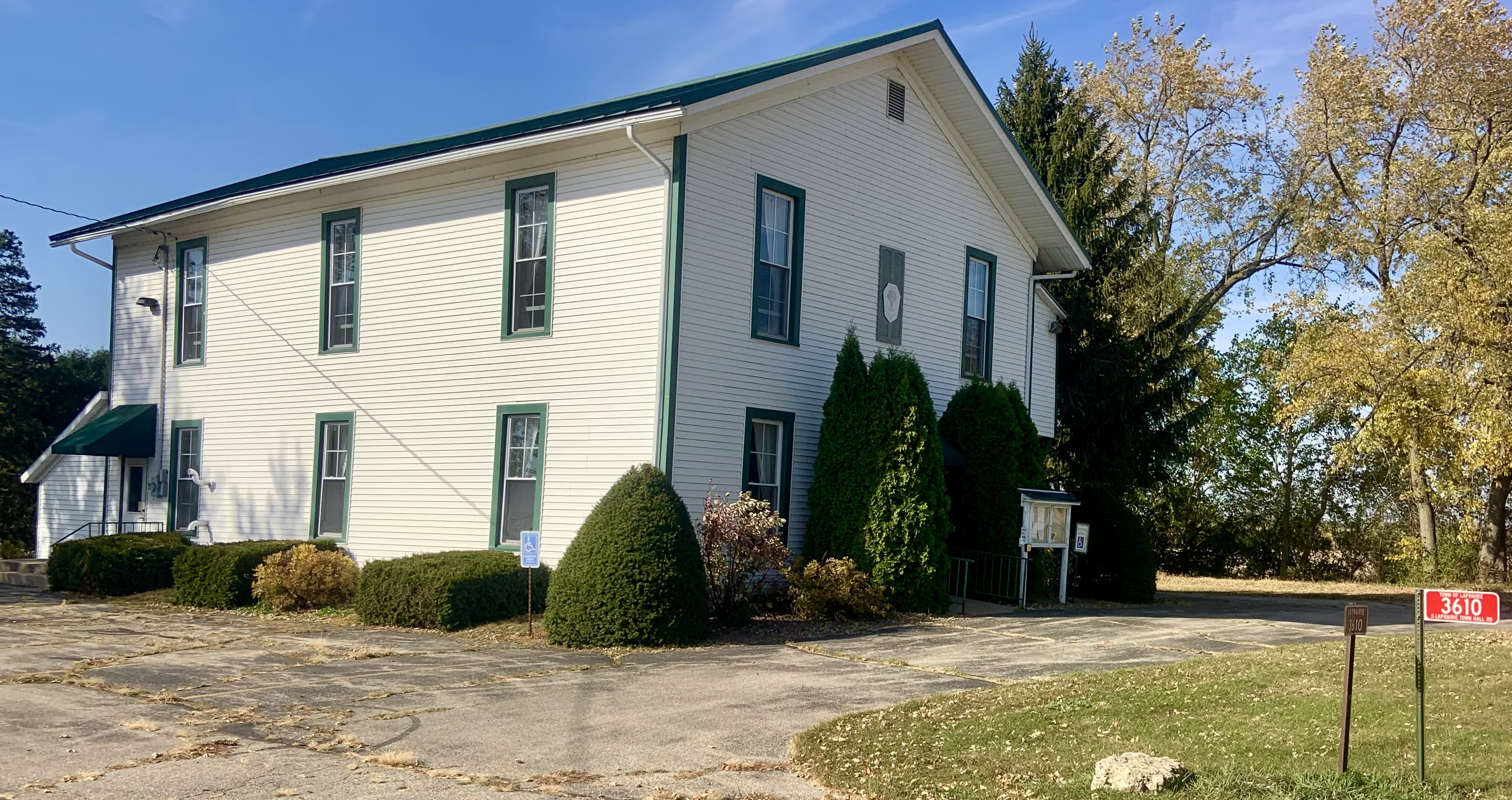
- Town hall

- Location of the Town of La Prairie in Rock County and the state of Wisconsin
- Coordinates: 42°37′38″N 88°57′47″W
- Country: United States
- State: Wisconsin
- County: Rock

Area
  - Total: 34.6 sq mi (89.7 km^{2})
  - Land: 34.6 sq mi (89.7 km^{2})
  - Water: 0 sq mi (0 km^{2})
- Elevation: 899 ft (274 m)

Population (2020)
  - Total: 784
  - Density: 27/sq mi (10.4/km^{2})
- Time zone: UTC-6 (Central (CST))
  - Summer (DST): UTC-5 (CDT)
- Area code: 608
- FIPS code: 55-42575
- GNIS feature ID: 1583530
- Website: https://laprairiewi.gov

The Town of La Prairie is a town in Rock County, Wisconsin, United States. The population was 784 at the 2020 census. The unincorporated community of Tiffany is located partially in the town.

== Geography ==
According to the United States Census Bureau, the town has a total area of 34.6 square miles (89.7 km^{2}), all land.

== Demographics ==
As of the census of 2000, there were 929 people, 342 households, and 266 families residing in the town. The population density was 26.8 people per square mile (10.4/km^{2}). There were 352 housing units at an average density of 10.2 per square mile (3.9/km^{2}). The racial makeup of the town was 98.71% White, 0.32% African American, 0.32% Native American, 0.32% Asian, and 0.32% from two or more races. Hispanic or Latino people of any race were 0.22% of the population.

There were 342 households, out of which 33% had children under the age of 18 living with them, 66.7% were married couples living together, 6.1% had a female householder with no husband present, and 22.2% were non-families. 16.7% of all households were made up of individuals, and 6.1% had someone living alone who was 65 years of age or older. The average household size was 2.72 and the average family size was 3.04.

In the town, the population was spread out, with 27.2% under the age of 18, 5.5% from 18 to 24, 27.9% from 25 to 44, 27.3% from 45 to 64, and 12.1% who were 65 years of age or older. The median age was 40 years. For every 100 females, there were 107.8 males. For every 100 females age 18 and over, there were 106.7 males.

The median income for a household in the town was $52,813, and the median income for a family was $59,625. Males had a median income of $38,250 versus $22,344 for females. The per capita income for the town was $22,108. About 4.8% of families and 8.7% of the population were below the poverty line, including 16.2% of those under age 18 and 1.7% of those age 65 or over.

== Notable people ==
- Adelmorn Sherman, Wisconsin legislator, lived in the town
- Henry Tarrant, Wisconsin legislator, lived in the town
- William G. Wheeler, Wisconsin legislator and U.S. Attorney, born in the town

== See also ==
- List of towns in Wisconsin
