= Seth W. Button =

19th century American politician

S. W. Button

County Judge of Monroe County, Wisconsin
- In office January 1890 – January 1898
- Preceded by: William M. Graham
- Succeeded by: Robert B. McCoy

District Attorney of Trempealeau County, Wisconsin
- In office May 1876 – January 1879
- Appointed by: Harrison Ludington
- Preceded by: Alfred W. Newman
- Succeeded by: Michael Milligan

Member of the Wisconsin State Assembly from the Trempealeau district
- In office January 6, 1873 – January 5, 1874
- Preceded by: Noah D. Comstock
- Succeeded by: Noah D. Comstock

County Judge of Trempealeau County, Wisconsin
- In office January 1867 – January 1, 1874
- Appointed by: Lucius Fairchild
- Preceded by: Alfred W. Newman
- Succeeded by: Charles E. Perkins

Personal details
- Born: May 23, 1836 Pontiac, Michigan, U.S.
- Died: November 18, 1913 (aged 77) Sparta, Wisconsin, U.S.
- Resting place: Woodlawn Cemetery, Sparta, Wisconsin
- Party: Republican
- Spouse: Martha A. Wheaton (m. 1858–1913)
- Children: Julius DeVere Button; (b. 1865; died 1922)
- Profession: Lawyer

Military service
- Allegiance: United States
- Branch/service: United States Volunteers; Union Army
- Years of service: 1861–1864
- Rank: 1st Lieutenant, USV
- Unit: 1st Reg. Wis. Vol. Infantry
- Battles/wars: American Civil War

Seth Windsor Button (May 23, 1836 – November 18, 1913) was an American lawyer, Republican politician, and Wisconsin pioneer. He was a member of the Wisconsin State Assembly, representing Trempealeau County during the 1873 session. He also served as a district attorney and county judge in Trempealeau and Monroe County, Wisconsin.

== Early life ==
Seth Windsor Button was born in Pontiac, Michigan, in May 1836. As a child, he came with his parents to Illinois and then to the Wisconsin Territory in 1842, where they settled in Decatur, Green County. Soon after settling in Green County, his father died, and Button then resided with an older brother and worked on his farm. He had little formal education in his early years, and at age 16 he walked to the area of Whitewater, Wisconsin, and joined a work crew constructing the first state railroad from Milwaukee to Prairie du Chien.

Throughout the next few years he worked a number of odd jobs, traveling as far as Minnesota for work. He brought his earnings back to Decatur and pooled it with other young men to hire a teacher. Through this education and a course at Beloit College, he was sufficiently educated to work as a teacher, which he used to sustain himself while studying law. He was admitted to the bar in 1860, and opened a law firm in Prescott, Wisconsin.

== Civil War service ==
After the outbreak of the American Civil War, Button shut down his law practice to volunteer for service in the Union Army. He was enrolled as a sergeant in Co. F in the 1st Wisconsin Infantry Regiment as it was being re-organized as a three-year enlistment regiment. The regiment proceeded to Kentucky, in October 1861 and remained in that area into the winter.

They entered Tennessee in February 1862, where they were engaged in guard duty through the Spring and Summer. In the Fall of 1862, they joined the movement against Braxton Bragg, culminating in the Battle of Perryville. At Perryville and the subsequent Battle of Stones River, Button had command of his company. He was wounded slightly by a ricochet at Perryville, but didn't leave the field. After Stones River, the regiment remained on guard duty near Murfreesboro, Tennessee, for six months; in January 1863, Button was promoted to sergeant major of the regiment, and in May he was commissioned second lieutenant and returned to his old company.

In the Summer of 1863, they set out on the Tullahoma campaign, to try to end the Confederate threat to Middle Tennessee. In the Fall, they ventured into northern Alabama and Georgia in the ill-fated Chickamauga campaign. During the campaign, Button was chosen to lead a forced crossing of the Elk River under enemy fire, after the Confederates had burned the bridges. Button was the first to read the far shore and organized his men on the far shore to begin clearing away the Confederate sharp shooters. Button then returned to the river and helped eight men who were in danger of drowning. But in the subsequent Battle of Chickamauga, in September 1863, Button was severely wounded and was never able to return to the front. Nevertheless he was promoted to first lieutenant and worked as a quartermaster at Johnsonville, Tennessee, until that store was destroyed in a raid by Nathan Bedford Forrest.

== Legal and political career ==
After his war service, Button returned to Wisconsin and opened a new law office in Galesville, in Trempealeau County, in partnership with Alfred W. Newman, who was then serving as county judge. Shortly after his arrival, Newman was elected district attorney, and Button was appointed as to finish his term as county judge. Button went on to win re-election as judge and served until January 1874.

While serving as judge, Button was the Republican nominee for Wisconsin State Assembly in Trempealeau County's Assembly district in 1872. He narrowly defeated his Liberal Republican opponent, Ole A. Hegg, and served in the 26th Wisconsin Legislature. He did not run for re-election in 1873, but in 1875 he was appointed district attorney, again filling the job vacated by his partner, Alfred W. Newman.

He served as district attorney until 1879, but suffered a nervous breakdown due to stress from his work. He left his law practice in the hands of his brother and went south to Texas to recuperate his health. He purchased a ranch near Mobeetie, Texas, where he drove cattle about northern Texas and Kansas for the next four years.

Rather than resuming his work in Trempealeau County, on his return to Wisconsin, Button moved to Tomah, Wisconsin, in Monroe County. He found himself left behind by recent laws and court decisions, so spent some time studying recent changes, and then opened a law practice in Tomah, and later Sparta, Wisconsin. In Monroe County, he was again elected county judge, serving from 1890 through 1898.

Button died at his home in Sparta on November 18, 1913, after a long illness.

== Personal life and family ==
Seth W. Button was one of fourteen children born to Charles Button and his wife Cynthia (née Watson). Seth Button's older brother, Julius C. Button, also served as a district attorney in Polk and Trempealeau counties.

Seth W. Button married Martha A. Wheaton in 1858. They had at least one son.

Button was an avid hunter and participated in an annual deer hunt in the northern woods for more than 25 years.

== Electoral history ==
=== Wisconsin Assembly (1872) ===
Wisconsin Assembly, Trempealeau District Election, 1872
Party	Candidate	Votes	%	±%
General Election, November 4, 1872
Republican	Seth W. Button	941	50.65%	−17.78%
Liberal Republican	Ole A. Hegg	917	49.35%	
Plurality		24	1.29%	-35.56%
Total votes		1,858	100.0%	+46.30%
Republican hold				

Wisconsin State Assembly
Preceded by Noah D. Comstock	Member of the Wisconsin State Assembly from the Trempealeau district January 6, 1873 – January 5, 1874	Succeeded by Noah D. Comstock
Legal offices
Preceded by Alfred W. Newman	County Judge of Trempealeau County, Wisconsin; January 1867 – January 1, 1874	Succeeded by Charles E. Perkins
Preceded by Alfred W. Newman	District Attorney of Trempealeau County, Wisconsin; May 1876 – January 1879	Succeeded by Michael Milligan
Preceded by William M. Graham	County Judge of Monroe County, Wisconsin; January 1, 1890 – January 1, 1898	Succeeded by Robert B. McCoy
