= 13th Wisconsin Infantry Regiment =

Union Army infantry regiment

- Flag of Wisconsin
- Active: October 17, 1861 – November 24, 1865
- Country: United States
- Allegiance: Union
- Branch: Infantry
- Size: Regiment
- Engagements: American Civil War

Commanders
- Colonel: Maurice Maloney
- Colonel: William P. Lyon

The 13th Wisconsin Infantry Regiment was an infantry regiment that served in the Union Army during the American Civil War.

== Service ==
The 13th Wisconsin was raised at Janesville, Wisconsin, and mustered into federal service October 17, 1861.

March to Fort Scott, Kansas, March 1–7, 1862, and duty there till March 26. Ordered to Lawrence, Kansas, March 26, thence to Fort Riley April 20 and to Fort Leavenworth May 27. Moved to St. Louis, Mo., thence to Columbus, Ky., May 29-June 2. Guard duty along Mobile & Ohio Railroad from Columbus, Ky., to Corinth, Miss., till August. Moved to Fort Henry, Tenn., thence to Fort Donelson, Tenn., September 2 and garrison duty there till November 11. Expedition to Clarksville September 5–10. Action at Rickett's Hill, Clarksville, September 7. Hopkinsville, Ky., November 6. Moved to Fort Henry November 11, and duty there as garrison and guarding supply steamers between the Fort and Hamburg Landing till February 3, 1863. Moved to relief of Fort Donelson February 3. Duty at Fort Donelson till August 27. March to Stevenson, Ala., August 27-September 14 and duty there guarding supplies till October. Moved to Nashville, Tenn., and duty there till February, 1864. Veterans on furlough February–March. Return to Nashville March 28. Garrison duty and guarding railroad trains from Louisville to Chattanooga till April 26. Guard duty along Tennessee River between Stevenson and Decatur till June. Moved to Claysville, Ala., June 4. Picket and patrol duty along Tennessee River till September. Scout from Gunter's Landing to Warrenton July 11 (Co. "C"). March to Woodville, thence to Huntsville, Ala., and guard Memphis & Charleston Railroad from Huntsville to Stevenson, Ala., with headquarters at Brownsboro till November. Repulse of Hood's attack on Decatur, October 26–29. At Stevenson till December. At Huntsville till March, 1865. Paint Rock Ridge December 31, 1864 (Co. "G"). Operations in East Tennessee March 15-April 22. At Nashville, Tenn., till June. Ordered to New Orleans June 16, thence to Indianola, Texas, July 12. Duty at Green Lake and San Antonio, Texas, till November.

The regiment was mustered out on November 24, 1865, at San Antonio, Texas.

13th Wisconsin Company Organization<
Company	Earliest Moniker	Primary Place of Recruitment	Company Commanders
A	Ruger Guards	Cities of Janesville and Plymouth, Rock County, and Sheboygan County	Edward Ruger (promoted to Adjutant); Samuel C. Cobb
B	Janesville City Zouaves	Rock County and Vernon County	Edwin E. Woodman; Jason W. Hall
C	State Line Rifles	Walworth County and Boone, Illinois	Augustus H. Kummel (promoted to Ordinance Officer); John T. Fish
D	Union Light Guards	Rock County	Edgar W. Blake; Cyrus E. Patchin
E	Green County Guards	Green County, Rock County and Milwaukee County	Robert H. Hewitt; Lemuel Parker
F	Janesville Rangers	Rock County	Fenton F. Stevens; Samuel S. Hart - Jerome W. Briggs
G	Orfordville Volunteers	Pierce County, Rock County, Green County, and Green Lake County	Thomas O. Bigney; Archibald N. Randall
H	Lander Guards	Jefferson County and Rock County	Joseph L. Pratt; Charles S. Noyes - Edgard J. Pratt
I	Walworth County Plow Boys	Walworth County and Jefferson County	Julius H. Lauderdale; Newton H. Kingman
K	Tredway Rifles	Rock County and Milwaukee County	Pliny Norcross; George W. Steel

== Casualties ==
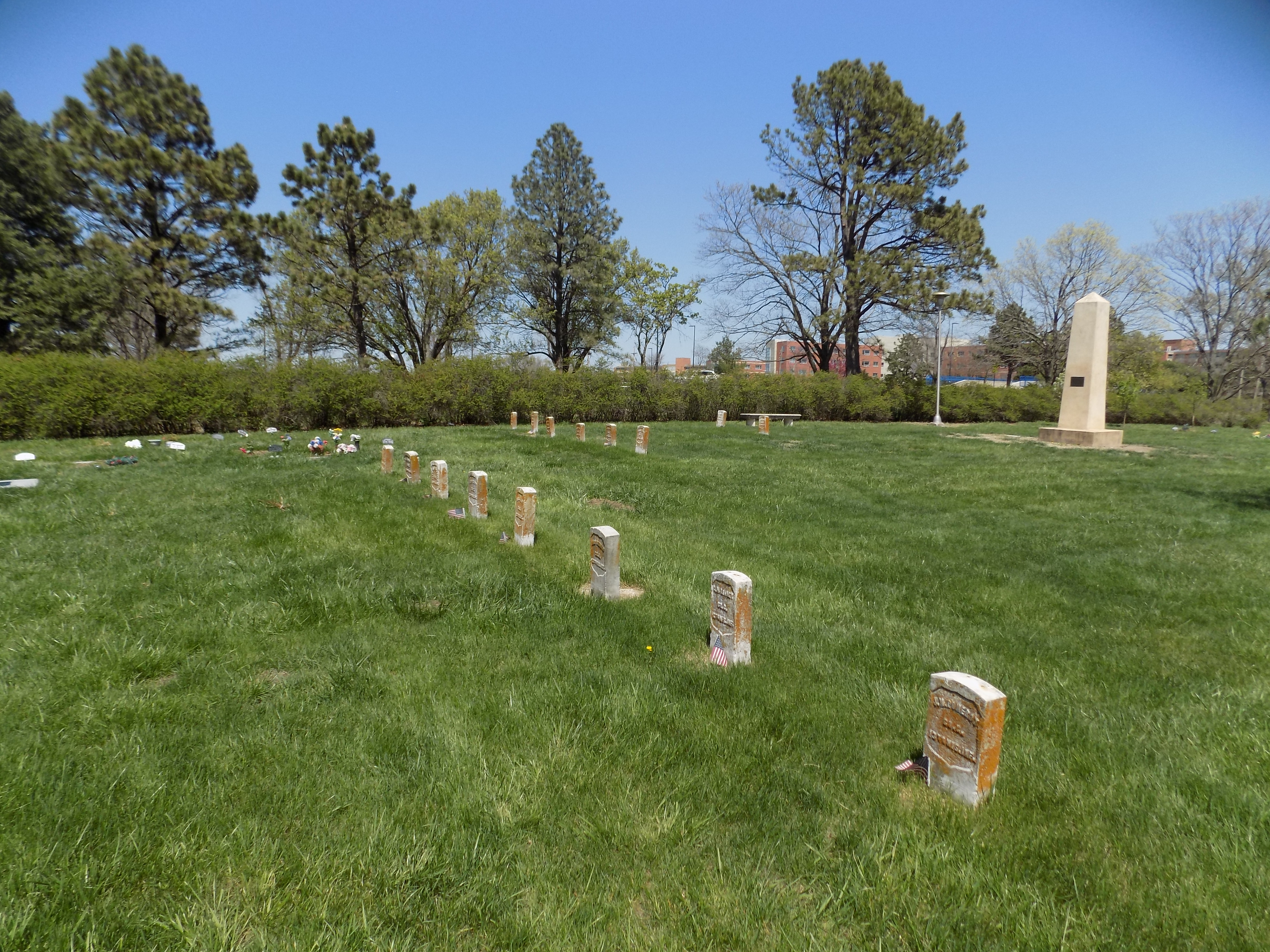
Graves markers for over a dozen members of the 13th Wisconsin Volunteer Infantry who died of typhoid in 1862, at Pioneer Cemetery in Lawrence, KS (2018).

The 13th Wisconsin suffered 5 enlisted men killed in action or who later died of their wounds, plus another 188 enlisted men who died of disease, for a total of 193 fatalities.

== Colonels ==
- Colonel Maurice Maloney (October 15, 1861 – August 1, 1862) was a U.S. Army captain in the 4th U.S. Infantry and retired in August 1862.
- Colonel William P. Lyon (August 6, 1862 – November 24, 1865) began the war as captain of Co. K in the 8th Wisconsin Infantry Regiment. He received an honorary brevet to brigadier general at the end of the war. After the war he became the 12th speaker of the Wisconsin State Assembly and the 7th chief justice of the Wisconsin Supreme Court.

== Notable members ==
- Ira Barnes Dutton, also known as Joseph Dutton, was quartermaster sergeant and was later commissioned 2nd lieutenant and promoted to 1st lieutenant in Co. I, finally promoted to quartermaster near the end of the war. After the war he became a Catholic missionary in Hawaii, ministering to the leper colony on Molokai until his death. He is a candidate for sainthood.
- John M. Evans was the regiment surgeon. After the war he served as a Wisconsin legislator and was the first mayor of Evansville, Wisconsin.
- John Fish, was the 2nd lieutenant of Company C until he was promoted to Captain in 1865. His son, Irving Fish later became a Major General in charge of the 32nd Infantry Division of the Wisconsin National Guard.
- Joseph I. Foot, son of Ezra Foot, was chaplain of the regiment near the end of the war.
- Edward Lee Greene was a private in Co. K. After the war he wrote an extensive botanical record of the plant species of the American west.
- Simon Lord was the 2nd assistant surgeon until 1863, when he was promoted out of the regiment to become surgeon of the 32nd Wisconsin Infantry Regiment. After the war he served as a Wisconsin state senator.
- Frederick F. Norcross, brother of Pliny Norcross, was a corporal in Co. K and died of disease at Nashville, in May 1865.
- Lanson P. Norcross, brother of Pliny Norcross, was a private in Co. K and served through the whole war with the regiment.
- Pliny Norcross was captain of Co. K for three years. Earlier in the war, he served as a corporal in Co. K of the 1st Wisconsin Infantry Regiment. After the war he became a Wisconsin state legislator and the 20th mayor of Janesville, Wisconsin.
- Archibald N. Randall was captain of Co. G. After the war he became a Wisconsin state senator.
- Hezekiah C. Tilton was chaplain of the regiment. After the war he served as a Wisconsin legislator.
- Edwin E. Woodman was captain of Co. B, but was detailed for much of the war as an engineering aide on the brigade and division staff. After the war he served as a Wisconsin state senator.

== See also ==
- List of Wisconsin Civil War units
- Wisconsin in the American Civil War
