= Tiffany, Rock County, Wisconsin =

Tiffany, Wisconsin
- Unincorporated community
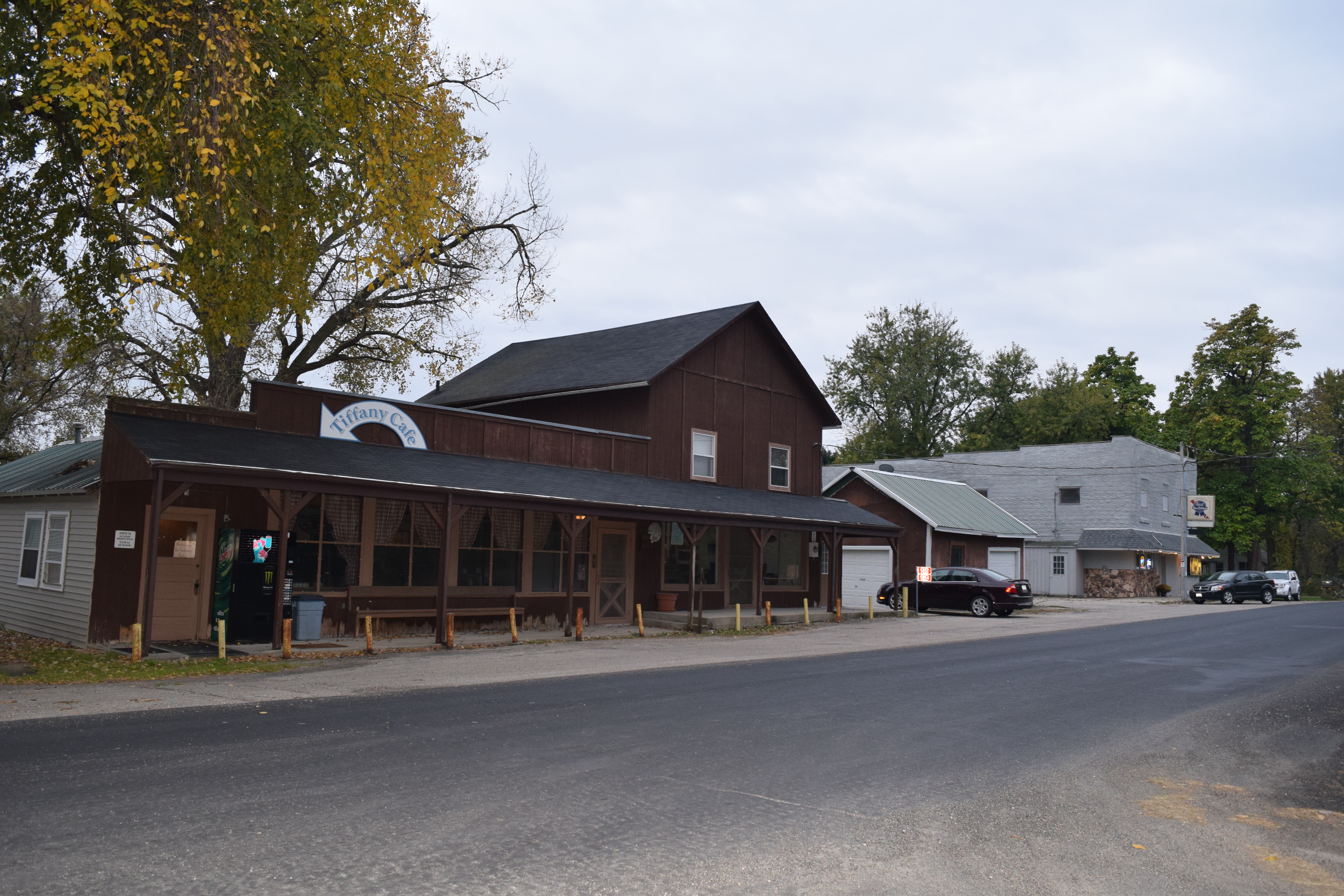

- Location within Wisconsin Location within the United States
- Coordinates: 42°34′57″N 88°55′37″W
- Country: United States
- State: Wisconsin
- County: Rock
- Elevation: 850 ft (260 m)
- Time zone: UTC-6 (Central (CST))
  - Summer (DST): UTC-5 (CDT)
- Area code: 608
- GNIS feature ID: 1575441

Tiffany (also Shopiere Depot or Shopiere Station) is an unincorporated community located in the towns of La Prairie and Turtle, Rock County, Wisconsin, United States.
