= Alexander McDonald Thomson =

American politician

Alexander M. Thomson
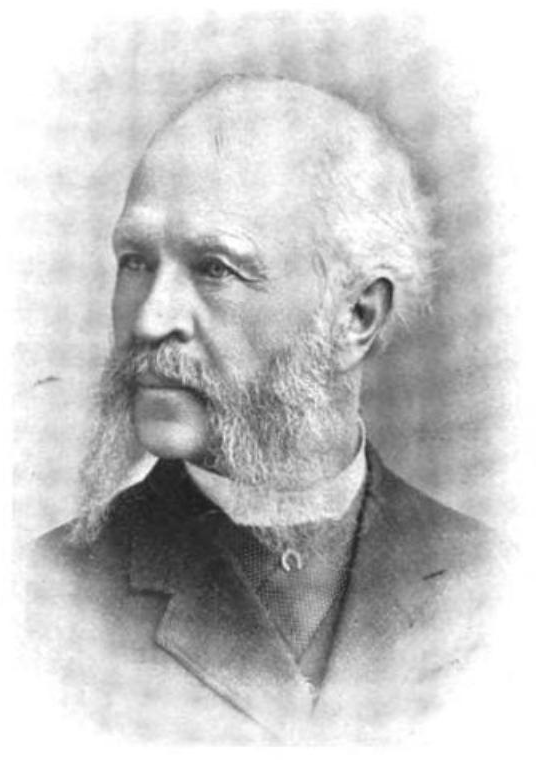
- Portrait which appeared in his work A Political History of Wisconsin (1900)

19th Speaker of the Wisconsin Assembly
- In office January 6, 1868 – January 3, 1870
- Preceded by: Angus Cameron
- Succeeded by: James M. Bingham

Member of the Wisconsin State Assembly from the Rock 5th district
- In office January 6, 1868 – January 3, 1870
- Preceded by: Pliny Norcross
- Succeeded by: Alexander Graham

Personal details
- Born: May 20, 1822 Pittsburgh, Pennsylvania, U.S.
- Died: June 9, 1898 (aged 76) Milwaukee, Wisconsin, U.S.
- Resting place: Union Cemetery, Hartford, Wisconsin
- Party: Republican
- Spouse: Emeline L. Thomson (died 1892)

Alexander McDonald Thomson (May 20, 1822 – June 9, 1898) was an American journalist, historian, and Republican politician. He served as the 19th Speaker of the Wisconsin State Assembly (1868–1870). In historical documents, he is sometimes referred to as A. M. Thomson or A. McD. Thomson.

== Biography ==
Thomson was born in Pittsburgh, Pennsylvania, in 1822 to immigrants from Scotland and Holland. His family moved to Ohio when he was a child. He moved to Hartford, Wisconsin, in 1848 and to Janesville, Wisconsin, in 1864. From 1870 to 1873, he was editor of the Milwaukee Sentinel. Thomson also authored A Political History of Wisconsin. He died in Milwaukee in 1898.

== Political career ==
Thomson was speaker of the Assembly from 1868 to 1869. In addition, he was sergeant at arms of the Assembly from 1864 to 1870. He was a Republican.

== Works ==
- Thomson, Alexander McDonald (1900). A Political History of Wisconsin. Milwaukee: E. C. Williams.

Wisconsin State Assembly
Preceded by Pliny Norcross	Member of the Wisconsin State Assembly from the Rock 5th district January 6, 1868 – January 3, 1870	Succeeded by Alexander Graham
Preceded by Angus Cameron	Speaker of the Wisconsin State Assembly; January 6, 1868 – January 3, 1870	Succeeded by James M. Bingham
