= Charles L. Valentine =

American politician (1846–1925)

37th Mayor of Janesville, Wisconsin
- In office April 1918 – April 15, 1919
- Preceded by: James A. Fathers
- Succeeded by: Thomas E. Welsh

Member of the Wisconsin State Assembly
- In office January 5, 1903 – January 2, 1905
- Preceded by: Almeron Eager
- Succeeded by: Pliny Norcross
- Constituency: Rock 2nd district
- In office January 7, 1901 – January 5, 1903
- Preceded by: William G. Wheeler
- Succeeded by: Alexander White
- Constituency: Rock 1st district

Personal details
- Born: October 16, 1846 Genesee County, New York, U.S.
- Died: April 13, 1925 (aged 78) Janesville, Wisconsin, U.S.
- Resting place: Oak Hill Cemetery, Janesville
- Party: Republican
- Spouse: Mary E. Gage (m. 1871; died 1921)

Military service
- Allegiance: United States
- Branch/service: United States Volunteers; Union Army
- Years of service: 1864
- Rank: Private, USV
- Unit: 5th Reg. Wis. Vol. Infantry
- Battles/wars: American Civil War

Charles L. Valentine (October 16, 1846 – April 13, 1925) was an American government administrator and Republican politician. He was the 37th mayor of Janesville, Wisconsin, and represented Janesville in the Wisconsin State Assembly during the 1901 and 1903 sessions.

== Biography ==
He was born on October 16, 1846, in Genesee County, New York. As a child, he moved to Wisconsin with his family in 1849, settling in Janesville, Wisconsin. During the American Civil War, Valentine enlisted in the Union Army and served with the 5th Wisconsin Infantry Regiment. He was severely wounded in the Battle of Spotsylvania Court House, which resulted in the loss of his right foot. Valentine was elected to the Wisconsin State Assembly in 1900 and was re-elected in 1902. Additionally, he was Clerk and Postmaster of Janesville and Register of Deeds of Rock County, Wisconsin. In 1918, Valentine served as mayor of Janesville. He was a Republican. Valentine died in Janesville, Wisconsin, after being ill for two years.
