= James Sutherland (Wisconsin politician) =

American educator and politician (1820–1905)

17th Mayor of Janesville, Wisconsin
- In office April 1872 – April 1874
- Preceded by: Anson Rogers
- Succeeded by: Hiram Merrill

Member of the Wisconsin Senate from the 17th district
- In office January 1, 1855 – January 3, 1859
- Preceded by: Ezra Miller
- Succeeded by: Zebulon P. Burdick

Personal details
- Born: March 20, 1820 Smithfield, Ohio, U.S.
- Died: October 30, 1905 (aged 85) Janesville, Wisconsin, U.S.
- Resting place: Oak Hill Cemetery, Janesville, Wisconsin
- Party: Republican; Free Soil (before 1854)
- Spouse: Elizabeth Withington (m. 1846; died 1899)
- Children: James A. Sutherland^{(b. 1847; died 1918)}; Orion Sutherland^{(b. 1849; died 1937)}; Arcturus Sutherland^{(b. 1852; died 1925)}; Leverrier Sutherland^{(b. 1854; died 1892)}; Araby Sutherland^{(b. 1858; died 1934)}; Charles L. Sutherland^{(b. 1858; died 1949)}; Lily Imogene (Percival)^{(b. 1861)}
- Education: Norwalk Seminary

James Sutherland (March 20, 1820 – October 30, 1905) was an American educator, historian, and Republican politician. He was the 17th mayor of Janesville, Wisconsin, (1872–1874) and was an important leader in the development of the city's school system. Earlier, he represented Rock County in the Wisconsin Senate (1855–1859), where he led the effort to create the Wisconsin normal schools.

== Biography ==
Sutherland was born on March 20, 1820, in Smithfield, Ohio. In December 1846, he married Elizabeth Withington. They had seven children. Sutherland moved to Janesville, Wisconsin in 1847. He was a member of the American Bible Society and Vice President of the Wisconsin Historical Society. He died in Janesville in 1905.

== Career ==
Sutherland was a delegate to the Free Soil Party National Convention in 1852. In 1854, he took part in organizing the Republican Party of Wisconsin.

In 1848, Sutherland became Janesville's first Superintendent of Schools. He then went on to serve three terms in the Senate representing the 17th district. Later, he was elected Mayor of Janesville in 1872 and re-elected in 1873.

Wisconsin Senate
Preceded by Ezra Miller	Member of the Wisconsin Senate from the 17th district January 1, 1855 – January 3, 1859	Succeeded by Zebulon P. Burdick
Political offices
Preceded by Anson Rogers	Mayor of Janesville, Wisconsin; April 1872 – April 1874	Succeeded by Hiram Merrill
