= Charles G. Williams =

American lawyer and politician (1829–1892)

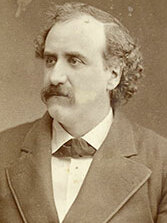

Chair of the House Foreign Affairs Committee
- In office March 4, 1881 – March 3, 1883
- Preceded by: Samuel S. Cox
- Succeeded by: Andrew Gregg Curtin

Member of the U.S. House of Representatives from Wisconsin's 1st district
- In office March 4, 1873 – March 3, 1883
- Preceded by: Alexander Mitchell
- Succeeded by: John Winans

President pro tempore of the Wisconsin Senate
- In office January 1, 1871 – January 1, 1873
- Preceded by: David Taylor
- Succeeded by: Henry L. Eaton

Member of the Wisconsin Senate from the 17th district
- In office January 1, 1869 – January 1, 1873
- Preceded by: S. J. Todd
- Succeeded by: Horatio N. Davis

Personal details
- Born: October 18, 1829 Royalton, New York, U.S.
- Died: March 30, 1892 (aged 62) Watertown, South Dakota, U.S.
- Resting place: Oak Hill Cemetery, Janesville, Wisconsin
- Party: Republican
- Spouses: Harriet Gregg (m. 1855; died 1856); Mary Anna Noggle (m. 1856–1892)
- Children: with Mary Anna Noggle; Kate Anna (Campbell)^{(b. 1861; died 1924)}; Ward David Williams^{(b. 1864; died 1926)}
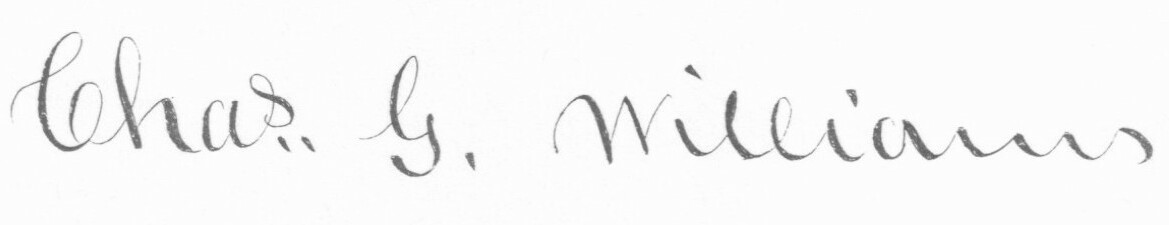
- Signature

Charles Grandison Williams (October 18, 1829 – March 30, 1892) was an American lawyer and Republican politician from Janesville, Wisconsin. He served 10 years in the U.S. House of Representatives, representing Wisconsin's 1st congressional district from 1873 to 1883. He was chairman of the House Foreign Affairs Committee for the 47th Congress. Before his election to Congress, he represented Rock County for four years in the Wisconsin Senate, and was president pro tempore of the Senate for the 1871 and 1872 terms.

== Biography ==
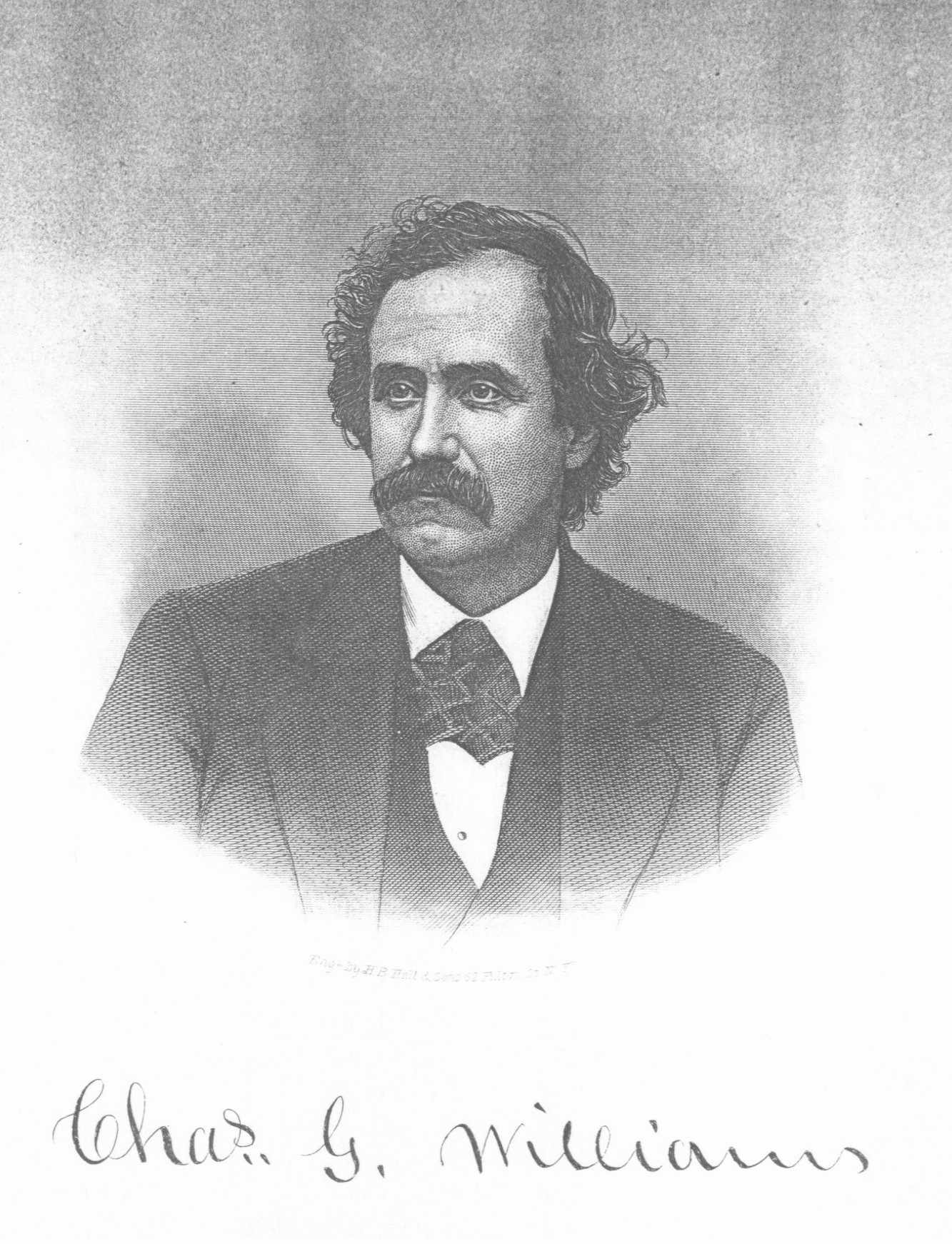
Charles G. Williams c.1870

Born in Royalton, New York, Williams pursued an academic course and studied law in Rochester, New York. He moved to Wisconsin in 1856, after the death of his first wife, and settled in Janesville, in Rock County. He was admitted to the bar and commenced practice in Janesville, where he would form a law partnership with David Noggle and Henry A. Patterson.

He was elected to the Wisconsin Senate in 1868 and re-elected in 1870. He was chosen as President pro tempore of the Senate for the 1871 and 1872 sessions. He was also a presidential elector for Ulysses S. Grant in the 1868 United States presidential election.

In 1872, Williams was elected to represent Wisconsin's 1st congressional district, and was subsequently re-elected four times, serving from March 4, 1873, until March 3, 1883. In the 47th Congress (1881-1883), he served as chairman of the Committee on Foreign Affairs.

He was defeated in the 1882 election while seeking a sixth term in Congress. After his defeat, he was appointed register of the land office for the Dakota Territory, and moved to Watertown, Dakota Territory, where he remained for the rest of his life. He died there on March 30, 1892.

He was interred at Oak Hill Cemetery in Janesville, Wisconsin.

== Personal life and family ==
His first wife, Harriet Gregg, died in 1856.

His second wife was Mary Anna Noggle, daughter Judge David Noggle, his early law partner and one of the founding fathers of Janesville. They had a daughter, Kate Anna Williams (1861–1924), and a son, Ward David Williams (1864–1926).

== Electoral history ==
=== Wisconsin Senate (1868, 1870) ===
Wisconsin Senate, 17th District Election, 1870
Party	Candidate	Votes	%	±%
General Election, November 8, 1870
Republican	Charles G. Williams	3,402	75.05%	
Independent Republican	E. P. King	1,131	24.95%	
Plurality		2,271	50.10%	
Total votes		4,533	100.0%	
Republican hold				

=== U.S. House of Representatives (1872, 1874, 1876) ===
Wisconsin's 1st Congressional District Election, 1872
Party	Candidate	Votes	%	±%
General Election, November 5, 1872
Republican	Charles G. Williams	15,666	62.55%	+20.03%
Liberal Republican	Ithamar Sloan	9,380	37.45%	
Plurality		6,286	25.10%	+10.14%
Total votes		25,046	100.0%	-13.06%
Republican gain from Democratic				

Wisconsin's 1st Congressional District Election, 1874
Party	Candidate	Votes	%	±%
General Election, November 3, 1874
Republican	Charles G. Williams (incumbent)	12,568	56.87%	−5.68%
Democratic	Nicholas D. Fratt	9,532	43.13%	
Plurality		3,036	13.74%	-11.36%
Total votes		22,100	100.0%	-11.76%
Republican hold				

Wisconsin's 1st Congressional District Election, 1876
Party	Candidate	Votes	%	±%
General Election, November 7, 1876
Republican	Charles G. Williams (incumbent)	18,206	59.33%	+2.47%
Democratic	H. G. Winslow	12,478	40.67%	
Plurality		5,728	18.67%	+4.93%
Total votes		30,684	100.0%	+38.84%
Republican hold				

=== U.S. House of Representatives (1878, 1880, 1882) ===
Wisconsin's 1st Congressional District Election, 1878
Party	Candidate	Votes	%	±%
General Election, November 5, 1878
Republican	Charles G. Williams (incumbent)	14,629	59.52%	+0.19%
Greenback	Charles H. Parker	9,949	40.48%	
Plurality		4,680	19.04%	+0.37%
Total votes		30,684	100.0%	-19.90%
Republican hold				

Wisconsin's 1st Congressional District Election, 1880
Party	Candidate	Votes	%	±%
General Election, November 2, 1880
Republican	Charles G. Williams (incumbent)	19,014	61.74%	+2.22%
Democratic	Clinton Babbitt	11,782	38.26%	
Plurality		7,232	23.48%	+4.44%
Total votes		30,796	100.0%	+25.30%
Republican hold				

Wisconsin's 1st Congressional District Election, 1882
Party	Candidate	Votes	%	±%
General Election, November 7, 1882
Democratic	John Winans	12,307	46.66%	+8.40%
Republican	Charles G. Williams (incumbent)	11,853	44.94%	−16.81%
Prohibition	Charles M. Blackman	2,207	8.37%	
Greenback	William L. Utley	10	0.04%	
	Scattering	1	0.00%	
Plurality		454	1.72%	-21.76%
Total votes		26,378	100.0%	-14.35%
Democratic gain from Republican		Swing	25.20%	

Wisconsin Senate
Preceded by S. J. Todd	Member of the Wisconsin Senate from the 17th district 1869 – 1873	Succeeded by Horatio N. Davis
Preceded by David Taylor	President pro tempore of the Wisconsin Senate; 1871 – 1873	Succeeded by Henry L. Eaton
U.S. House of Representatives
Preceded by Alexander Mitchell	Member of the U.S. House of Representatives from Wisconsin's 1st congressional district March 4, 1873 – March 3, 1883	Succeeded by John Winans
Preceded by Samuel S. Cox	Chair of the House Foreign Affairs Committee; March 4, 1881 – March 3, 1883	Succeeded by Andrew Gregg Curtin
