= Henry Tarrant =

American politician

Henry Tarrant was a member of the Wisconsin State Assembly.

== Biography ==
Tarrant was born on May 23, 1833, at Woolhampton in Berkshire in England. In 1850, he moved to Janesville, Wisconsin. After moving to Vernon County, Wisconsin, and returning to Janesville, he settled in La Prairie, Wisconsin.

On December 26, 1857, he married Margaret Jane Arnold. Both Tarrant and his wife were members of the Methodist Episcopal Church. They had ten children. He died on September 2, 1903, at his home in Janesville, Wisconsin from a heart ailment.

== Career ==
Tarrant was a member of the Assembly from 1889 to 1893. Other positions he held include town clerk of La Prairie and county treasurer and chairman of the county board of supervisors of Rock County, Wisconsin. He was a Republican.
