= Hiram Merrill =

American politician (1829–1908)

18th Mayor of Janesville, Wisconsin
- In office April 1874 – April 1875
- Preceded by: James Sutherland
- Succeeded by: James W. St. John

Member of the Wisconsin State Assembly from the Rock 5th district
- In office January 4, 1875 – January 3, 1876
- Preceded by: John Winans
- Succeeded by: Jere A. Blount

Personal details
- Born: January 14, 1829 Adams, New York, U.S.
- Died: September 5, 1908 (aged 79) Janesville, Wisconsin, U.S.
- Resting place: Oak Hill Cemetery, Janesville, Wisconsin
- Party: Republican
- Spouse: Louise Merrill (died 1921)
- Children: Harry Merrill^{(b. 1859; died 1893)}; Louise Adele (Wiggin)^{(b. 1868; died 1954)}; Jessie Eugenia (Nowlan)^{(b. 1870; died 1931)}

Hiram Merrill (January 14, 1829 – September 5, 1908) was an American businessman and Wisconsin pioneer. He was the 18th mayor of Janesville, Wisconsin, and a member of the Wisconsin State Assembly.

== Biography ==
Merrill was born on January 14, 1829, in Adams, New York, and came to what is now Milwaukee, Wisconsin, in 1837, where his father ran the Traveler's Inn at Walker's Point. Hiram worked in his father's shipyard, then headed west in 1849 for the California gold rush, where he sold water for hydraulic mining. On October 20, 1856, he married Louise Ballard. Merrill and his wife were Episcopalians. They had four children. He died on June 9, 1893.

== Career ==
In 1866 the Merrills settled in Janesville, Wisconsin, where Hiram gained control of the New Gas Light Company. He was elected to the Assembly in 1874, defeating incumbent John Winans, who later became a member of the United States House of Representatives. Other positions Merrill held include Mayor of Janesville. He was an Independent Republican.
