= Agesilaus Wilson =

American politician

Agesilaus O. Wilson was a member of the Wisconsin State Assembly. He was elected to the Assembly in 1892, succeeding John Winans. Other positions he held include Clerk of the Board of Education of Janesville, Wisconsin. Wilson was a Democrat. He was born on May 2, 1842, in Bradford, Maine. He served as editor for the Janesville Times and the James Daily Recorder. He also served as postmaster for Janesville, Wisconsin. Wilson also served as mayor of Janesville from 1903 until his death. Wilson died on April 28, 1904, in Janesville, Wisconsin.
