= William B. Britton =

19th century American politician

Member of the Wisconsin State Assembly from the Rock 2nd district
- In office January 1, 1883 – January 5, 1885
- Preceded by: John Winans
- Succeeded by: Pliny Norcross

Personal details
- Born: January 8, 1829 Monmouth County, New Jersey, U.S.
- Died: December 19, 1910 (aged 81) Janesville, Wisconsin, U.S.
- Resting place: Oak Hill Cemetery, Janesville
- Party: Republican
- Spouse: Elizabeth Combs (died 1912)
- Children: Irene (Lane); (b. 1853; died 1925)

Military service
- Allegiance: United States
- Branch/service: United States Volunteers; Union Army
- Years of service: 1861–1865
- Rank: Colonel, USV
- Commands: 8th Reg. Wis. Vol. Infantry
- Battles/wars: American Civil War

William Buckman Britton (January 8, 1829 – December 19, 1910) was an American merchant, Republican politician, and Wisconsin pioneer. He served one term in the Wisconsin State Assembly, representing Rock County during the 1883 term. Earlier, he served two years as a member of the city council of Janesville, Wisconsin (1874–1876), and served as a Union Army officer throughout the American Civil War.

== Early life ==
William Britton was born on January 8, 1829, in Monmouth County, New Jersey. He was raised and educated in that region, then traveled west as a young man, settling in Janesville, Wisconsin, in 1855.

== Civil War service ==
At the outbreak of the American Civil War, Britton helped to organize the "Janesville Fire Zouaves" volunteer company for service in the Union Army. The Janesville Fire Department provided a significant number of volunteers to the company and gave the company its name. Britton, who was at the time the chief engineer of the fire department, was elected captain of the company, which was then incorporated into the 8th Wisconsin Infantry Regiment and organized as Company G in that regiment. The 8th Wisconsin Infantry mustered into federal service in September 1861, and Britton mustered in as captain of Co. G.

Britton eventually achieved the rank of colonel and assumed command of the regiment. Engagements he participated in include the Battle of Jackson, Mississippi, the Red River Campaign and the Battle of Nashville.

== Postbellum career ==
After the war, Britton became co-owner of a successful furniture factory for several years known as Britton & Kimball.

He also remained involved in Wisconsin military affairs in the Wisconsin Army National Guard, and served as colonel of the 1st regiment of the Wisconsin National Guard for several years.

In 1874 and 1875, he was elected to serve on the Janesvile Common Council. In 1882, he was elected to the Wisconsin State Assembly from Rock County's 2nd Assembly district. His district comprised all of the city and town of Janesville and the neighboring town of Rock. He ran on the Republican Party ticket and narrowly defeated Democrat C. B. Conrad; Britton received 1067 votes to Conrad's 1037, with 101 votes cast for a Prohibition candidate. Britton served in the Republican minority in the 36th Wisconsin Legislature, and was a member of the Assembly Committee on Cities.

== Personal life and family ==
William Britton was one of at least three children born to Nicholas Britton and his wife Margaret (née Mount).

From around 1904, Britton used a wheelchair as his health gradually declined. He died in his sleep on December 19, 1910, at his home in Janesville. He was survived by his wife and daughter, and five grandchildren.

Military offices
Preceded by Col. John Wayles Jefferson	Command of the 8th Wisconsin Infantry Regiment; October 11, 1864 – September 5, 1865	Regiment disbanded
Wisconsin State Assembly
Preceded by John Winans	Member of the Wisconsin State Assembly from the Rock 2nd district January 1, 1883 – January 5, 1885	Succeeded by Pliny Norcross
