= Frank Matteson Bostwick =

United States Navy commodore

- Born: April 13, 1857; Janesville, Wisconsin, US
- Died: December 20, 1945 (aged 88)
- Burial place: Arlington National Cemetery
- Military career
- Allegiance: United States
- Branch: United States Navy
- Service years: 1877–1910
- Rank: Commodore
- Commands: Nipsic; Philadelphia; Eagle; Buffalo
- Conflicts: Spanish–American War; Philippine–American War

Frank Matteson Bostwick (April 13, 1857 – December 20, 1945) was a Commodore in the United States Navy.

== Biography ==
Bostwick was born on April 13, 1857, in Janesville, Wisconsin. He married Elvira Gregg Hartwell on August 14, 1879. Bostwick and Elvira (1850–1912) are buried at Arlington National Cemetery.

== Career ==
After graduating from the United States Naval Academy in 1877 Bostwick served on the Pacific Station, at Mare Island Navy Yard, California, and on the Asiatic Station, until 1898. He served aboard the protected cruiser Charleston during the Spanish–American War in 1898, and in Charleston, and on the gunboats Bennington and Marietta during the Philippine–American War in 1898–1901.

Bostwick was navigator and later First Lieutenant of the battleship Oregon from March–October 1901, before taking command of the gunboat Nipsic in October 1901, then the cruiser Philadelphia from May 1904, and the yacht Eagle from September 1904 until September 1906.

He was a Lighthouse Inspector in the 10th District between September 1906 and June 1908, then the commander of the auxiliary cruiser Buffalo from June 1908 until April 1909. From June 1909 to July 1910 he commanded the Portsmouth Naval Shipyard, receiving promotion to Captain in 1909, and retired at his own request, with the rank of Commodore, on June 30, 1910.

== Awards ==
Awards he received include the Spanish Campaign Medal and the Philippine Campaign Medal.
