= Archibald N. Randall =

American lawyer and politician

Archibald N. Randall (August 22, 1830 – July 16, 1916) was an American lawyer and politician.

Born in Sardinia, Erie County, New York, Randall attended Brockport Collegiate Institute. In 1847, Randall moved to the town of Avon, Wisconsin Territory. He served in the 13th Wisconsin Infantry Regiment during the American Civil War and was commissioned a captain. In 1869, he moved to Brodhead, Wisconsin. In 1873, Randall was admitted to the Wisconsin bar. Randall served on the Board of Supervisors in Rock and Green Counties. In 1882 and 1883, Randall served in the Wisconsin State Senate and was a Republican. Randall died at his home in Brodhead, Wisconsin due to injuries from tripping over a croquet arch.
