= Henry A. Patterson =

American politician

Henry A. Patterson was a member of the Wisconsin State Assembly.

== Biography ==
Patterson was born on June 8, 1829, in Lindley, New York. He attended Genesee Wesleyan Seminary. In 1855, Patterson moved to Janesville, Wisconsin. There he formed a law partnership with David Noggle and Charles G. Williams. He died on September 26, 1901.

== Political career ==
Patterson was a member of the Wisconsin State Assembly during the 1873 session. He was defeated for re-election by John Winans. Patterson was District Attorney of Rock County, Wisconsin, Postmaster of Janesville, a municipal court judge, and a justice of the peace. He was a Republican.
