= Zebulon P. Burdick =

American politician (1806–1892)

Member of the Wisconsin Senate from the 17th district
- In office January 3, 1859 – January 7, 1861
- Preceded by: James Sutherland
- Succeeded by: Ezra Foot

Member of the Wisconsin State Assembly from Rock County
- In office 1858, 1872, 1875
Assembly terms detail
In office January 4, 1875 – January 3, 1876
Preceded by	Solomon C. Carr
Succeeded by	George Gleason
Constituency	Rock 2nd district
In office January 1, 1872 – January 6, 1873
Preceded by	Townshend Powell
Succeeded by	David F. Sayre
Constituency	Rock 2nd district
In office January 4, 1858 – January 3, 1859
Preceded by	Ezra Foot
Succeeded by	Joseph K. P. Porter
Constituency	Rock 4th district

Chairman of the Board of Supervisors of Rock County, Wisconsin
- In office April 1853 – April 1858

Personal details
- Born: June 10, 1806 Grafton, New York, U.S.
- Died: April 3, 1892 (aged 85) Rock County, Wisconsin, U.S.
- Resting place: Oak Hill Cemetery, Janesville, Wisconsin
- Party: Republican
- Spouses: Amanda DeMoray (m. 1828; died 1834); Philena Brock (m. 1838; died 1891)
- Children: with Amanda DeMoray; Sullivan Rush Burdick^{(b. 1830; died 1850)}; Anna Rachel (Knox)^{(b. 1831; died 1907)}; with Philena Brock; Edson A. Burdick^{(b. 1839; died 1916)}; Emma Ophelia Burdick^{(b. 1844; died 1848)}; Emmett E. Burdick^{(b. 1848; died 1927)}
- Occupation: Farmer, politician

Zebulon Palmer Burdick (June 10, 1806 – April 3, 1892) was an American farmer, Republican politician, and Wisconsin pioneer. He served two years in the Wisconsin Senate (1859, 1860) and three years in the Wisconsin State Assembly (1858, 1872, 1875), representing western Rock County. He also served 14 years as chairman of the town of Janesville, and served five years as chairman of the Board of Supervisors of Rock County.

== Biography ==
Zebulon Burdick was born on June 10, 1806, in Grafton, New York, the fourth of twelve children born to Joseph and Betsey Burdick. In 1828, he married Amanda M. Demoray. They had two children. In 1838, he married Philena Brock. They had three children. Burdick and his family moved to Wisconsin in 1849, settling in Rock County, Wisconsin. In 1852, they moved to the town of Janesville. Burdick died on April 3, 1892. He and his family were members of the Methodist Episcopal Church.

== Career ==
Running on the Republican Party ticket, Burdick was an unsuccessful candidate for Assembly in 1856, before winning election in 1857 and serving in the 1858 term. In 1858, he was elected to a two year term in the Wisconsin Senate, representing Wisconsin's 17th Senate district, which then comprised the western half of Rock County. Later, he served two more terms in the Assembly, in the 1872 and 1875 terms.

He served at least 14 years as chairman of the Board of Supervisors of the town of Janesville, and served at least five years as chairman of the Board of Supervisors of Rock County (1853–1857).
