= Edwin E. Woodman =

American politician

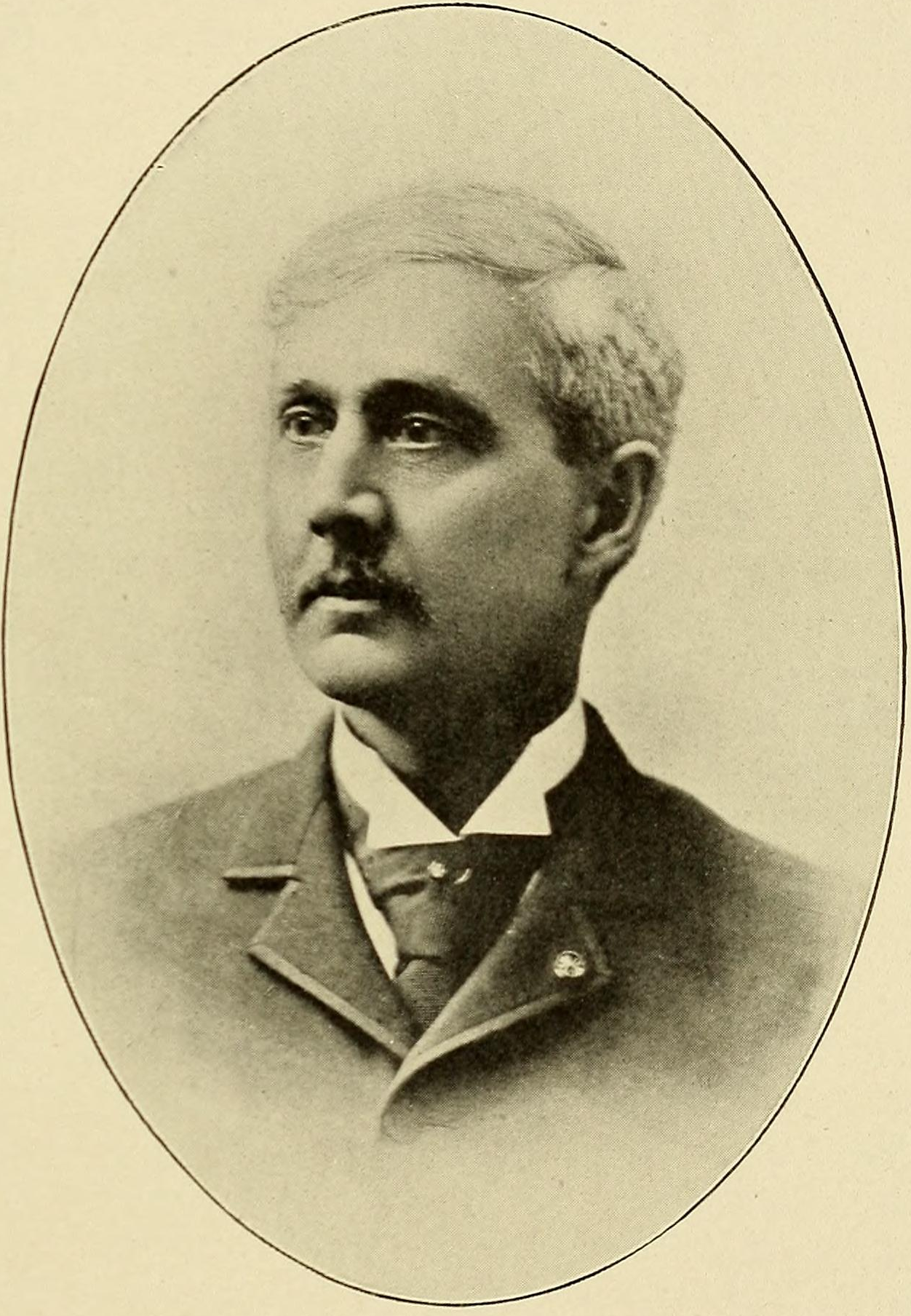
- Likeness from Journal of the Association of Engineering Societies Vol. 50

Member of the Wisconsin Senate from the 14th district
- In office January 5, 1880 – January 2, 1882
- Preceded by: David E. Welch
- Succeeded by: John T. Kingston

Personal details
- Born: June 1, 1838 St. Louis, Missouri, U.S.
- Died: August 29, 1912 (aged 74) Shell Lake, Wisconsin, U.S.
- Resting place: Greenwood Cemetery, Monroe, Wisconsin
- Party: Republican
- Spouse: Elizabeth Keziah Churchill (died 1926)

Military service
- Allegiance: United States
- Branch/service: United States Volunteers; Union Army
- Years of service: 1861–1864
- Rank: Captain, USV
- Unit: 13th Reg. Wis. Vol. Infantry
- Battles/wars: American Civil War

Edwin Ellis Woodman (June 1, 1838 – August 29, 1912) was an American engineer and Republican politician. He was a member of the Wisconsin State Senate, representing Juneau and Sauk counties in the 1880 and 1881 sessions.

== Biography ==
Edwin Woodman was born in St. Louis, Missouri, on June 1, 1838. He was raised and educated in St. Louis until the death of his father in 1853. He and his mother then moved to Monroe, Wisconsin, where he completed his education and began his interest in engineering, studying under Joseph Thompson Dodge. He briefly attended the University of Wisconsin to improve his understanding of higher mathematics, but could not afford to continue his studies. He took up teaching in order to finance his further education, but his work was interrupted by the outbreak of the American Civil War.

He helped raise a company of volunteers for service in the Union Army and was elected their captain. His company was enrolled as Company B in the 13th Wisconsin Infantry Regiment. He served a full three year enlistment, but for much of the time he was detailed as an engineering aide on the staff of Brigadier General Robert S. Granger and later Major General Lovell Rousseau.

After leaving federal service, he returned to Monroe, where he was employed as principal of the high school. He was soon hired as an engineer on railroad projects, but the work mostly dried up in the Panic of 1873. At that time, he went to work as an editor for a weekly newspaper—the Baraboo Republic. He was publisher of the paper for six years, during which time he was granted an honorary engineering degree from the University of Wisconsin.

In 1879, he was elected to the Wisconsin State Senate, running on the Republican Party ticket. He represented the 14th State Senate district, which then comprised Juneau and Sauk counties.

At the end of his two year term, he returned to the railroad industry, working on the Chicago & North Western Railway Company. In 1884, he was elected secretary of the Chicago, St. Paul, Minneapolis and Omaha Railway. He worked in that role until he was compelled to retire in 1907 due to poor health.

His health never fully recovered and he died at his summer home in Shell Lake, Wisconsin, in August 1912.

Near the end of his life, he published a narrative called Damien and Dutton which focused on the story of Joseph Dutton, who had served with Woodman in the 13th Wisconsin Infantry and spent the rest of his life working as a Catholic missionary with Father Damien in Hawaii, ministering to the leper colony on Molokai.

== Electoral history ==
=== Wisconsin Senate (1879) ===
Wisconsin Senate, 14th District Election, 1879
Party	Candidate	Votes	%	±%
General Election, November 4, 1879
Republican	Edwin E. Woodman	4,469	52.52%	−1.14%
Democratic	J. W. Lusk	3,273	38.47%	+5.74%
Greenback	J. B. Potter	767	9.01%	−4.60%
Plurality		1,196	14.06%	-6.88%
Total votes		8,509	100.0%	+47.80%
Republican hold				

== Published works ==
- Woodman, Edwin E. (1912). Damien and Dutton. St. Paul: Pioneer Co.
