= Alexander Graham (politician) =

American politician and businessman

Alexander Graham (April 6, 1816 – May 1, 1895) was an American politician and businessman.

Born in Utica, New York, Graham was educated in Homer, New York. Graham was in the banking and real estate business. He served as superintendent of schools in Chemung County, New York and then in Tompkins County, New York. In 1851, he served in the New York State Assembly, as a Whig, from Tompkins County, New York. In 1858, he settled in Janesville, Wisconsin. He served as school commissioner in Janesville and served on the Janesville Common Council in 1864. In 1869, 1871, and 1872, Graham served in the Wisconsin State Assembly as a Republican.

New York State Assembly
Preceded by Henry Brewer	New York State Assembly; Tompkins County, 1st District; 1851	Succeeded by Alvah Hurlbut
