= Cyrus Miner =

American businessman and politician from Wisconsin (1827–1899)

Cyrus Miner (July 24, 1827 – October 2, 1899) was an American businessman and politician.

Born in Danville, Vermont, Miner moved to Wisconsin in 1848 and settled in Janesville, Wisconsin. He was involved in the mercantile business and was also with the Wisconsin Agricultural Society and the Rock Island Agricultural Society. Miner served on the Rock County, Wisconsin Board of Supervisors and the Janesville Board of Education and was a Republican. He was on the board of trustees of the Wisconsin School for the Deaf. In 1889, Miner served in the Wisconsin State Assembly. He died in Janesville, Wisconsin, in 1899.
