= William G. Wheeler =

American lawyer and politician (1861–1936)

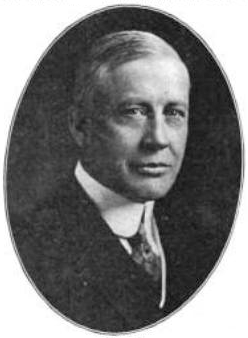

United States Attorney for the Western District of Wisconsin
- In office 1901–1909
- President: Theodore Roosevelt
- Preceded by: David F. Jones
- Succeeded by: George H. Gordon

Member of the Wisconsin State Assembly from the Rock 1st district
- In office January 1, 1897 – January 1, 1901
- Preceded by: Edward F. Hansen
- Succeeded by: Franklin Johnson

District Attorney of Rock County
- In office January 1, 1891 – January 1, 1895
- Preceded by: B. M. Malone
- Succeeded by: William A. Jackson

Personal details
- Born: William Guy Wheeler; November 11, 1861 La Prairie, Wisconsin
- Died: July 3, 1936 (aged 74) Chicago, Illinois
- Resting place: Oak Hill Cemetery; Janesville, Wisconsin
- Party: Republican
- Spouses: Jessie Jackman; (died 1953)
- Parents: Guy Wheeler (father); Ann L. (Snell) Wheeler (mother)

William Guy Wheeler (November 11, 1861 – July 3, 1936) was an American lawyer and politician. He was United States Attorney for the Western District of Wisconsin during the presidency of Theodore Roosevelt and served four years in the Wisconsin State Assembly, representing Rock County, Wisconsin.

== Biography ==
Wheeler was born on November 11, 1861, in La Prairie, Wisconsin. He graduated from Janesville High School in Janesville, Wisconsin, in 1881. In December 1881, he began studying law at the law office of Winans & Fethers and read law for three years, and, in 1884, was admitted to the State Bar of Wisconsin. That same year he was hired as deputy clerk of the Wisconsin circuit court for Rock County, and, a year later, he took over as clerk. He left office in 1887 and went into private practice, but was elected District attorney of Rock County in 1890 and served in that role until 1895. He was elected to the Wisconsin State Assembly in 1896 to represent the Janesville-based Rock County 1st district, and was re-elected in 1898. In 1901, he was appointed United States Attorney for the Western District of Wisconsin by President Theodore Roosevelt and served through all of Roosevelt's eight years, leaving office in 1909.

He died on July 3, 1936, in Chicago, Illinois.

== Electoral history ==
Wisconsin Assembly, Rock 1st District Election, 1896
Party	Candidate	Votes	%	±%
General Election, November 3, 1896
Republican	William G. Wheeler	2,235	59.86%	
Democratic	John Winans	1,499	40.14%	
Total votes		'3,734'	'100.0%'	
Republican hold				

Wisconsin Assembly, Rock 1st District Election, 1898
Party	Candidate	Votes	%	±%
General Election, November 8, 1898
Republican	William G. Wheeler	1,616	55.32%	−4.53%
Democratic	Charles C. Russell	1,305	44.68%	
Total votes		'2,921'	'100.0%'	-21.77%
Republican hold				
