= Uptown Janesville =

- Location: Janesville, Wisconsin, United States
- Coordinates: 42°42′42″N 88°59′55″W
- Opened: September 1973
- Developer: M. H. Hausman Co.
- Manager: RockStep Capital
- Owner: RockStep Capital
- Num. of stores: 68 (+ kiosks)
- Num. of anchor tenants: 6 (3 open, 2 vacant)
- Floor area: 627,128 square feet (58,262 m^{2})
- Floors: 1
- Parking: 2,700 spaces
- Public transit: Janesville Transit System
- Website: uptownjanesville.com

Uptown Janesville (formerly Janesville Mall) is an enclosed shopping mall located in Janesville, Wisconsin, United States. Opened in 1973, the mall has nearly 30 tenants (out of a possible 70). The anchor stores are Dick's Sporting Goods (which occupies a portion of the former JCPenney anchor), Ulta Beauty, and Kohl's. The former Boston Store anchor is vacant, while the former Sears anchor was demolished in favor of the new Woodman's Sports & Convention Center.

== Origins ==
In 1970, developer Roger Benjamin began scouting a site to construct a strip mall featuring Welles, a Midwestern discount department store chain. Flying over southern Wisconsin, he identified acres of open land in the Town of Harmony along Milton Avenue, between the main downtown streets and Interstate 90. Benjamin determined that with nearly 200,000 people, the Janesville trading area had a large enough population and sufficient financial resources to support a mall. Montgomery Ward had already begun to build a store on one of the sites he was considering.

Benjamin and two partners created Janesville Properties Company, which purchased 40 acres (160,000 m^{2}) of land adjoining the Montgomery Ward site, and began planning the development. With the agreement of Montgomery Ward management, Benjamin modified his original plan for a strip mall in favor of an enclosed mall where Welles and Montgomery Ward would serve as anchor stores. Within a year, Rockford-based department store Charles V. Weise (owned by Bergner's) signed on to become a third anchor; its store was located midway between the other department stores, and a prominent central courtyard was planned outside its entrance. Plans to construct the $10 million enclosed mall were announced in November 1970 with groundbreaking set for spring 1971.

The parent company of Welles filed for bankruptcy while the mall was still being built. Their anchor was then taken by J. C. Penney and extended into the mall at their request.

Janesville Mall opened in September 1973, featuring the three anchor stores and 12 other tenants. Unlike nearby Beloit Plaza in Beloit, the newer mall was enclosed, and thus considered more desirable in Wisconsin's often cold climate. The remaining interior spaces of the mall soon filled up with national chain tenants.

== 1980s ==
In 1985, Illinois-based Bergner's acquired the Boston Store chain and then re-branded the Charles V. Weise stores as Bergner's. Also in 1985, the Montgomery Ward anchor closed and was replaced later that same year by Kohl's. Mall management undertook a multimillion-dollar remodeling in 1986, refinishing the mall courts with new flooring, new benches, and live fig trees.

== 1990s ==
The nearby Beloit Plaza began losing stores because of competition from the upgraded Janesville Mall. When Bergner's declared Chapter 11 bankruptcy in 1991, its store at Beloit Plaza was closed, and the Bergner's anchor at Janesville Mall was re-branded to Boston Store. The mall was remodeled again in 1991, this time featuring a brighter, pastel-based color scheme; the fig trees were removed.

Janesville Mall's management approached the Sears chain in 1996 in a second attempt to bring a Sears anchor to the mall. This time, Sears was offered the opportunity to shutter its Beloit Plaza store in favor of a new store at Janesville Mall, with an Auto Center on an outparcel; various financial incentives, including tax breaks, were also part of this deal. Sears accepted the offer and, by 1997, a new 110,000-square-foot (10,000 m^{2}), two-story Sears was built onto Janesville Mall as a fourth anchor, while the older Beloit Plaza Sears was closed. With the addition of the Sears anchor, the mall grew to 627,128 square feet (58,262 m^{2}) in size.

In 1998, the mall was acquired by CBL & Associates Properties, Inc., a real estate trust based in Tennessee. That same year, Kohl's expanded its store into what had previously been smaller mall shops. The mall's movie theater closed, with Chuck E. Cheese's taking its place.

== 2010s ==
On May 3, 2014, the Janesville Mall J. C. Penney anchor closed, one of 33 closures nationwide by that chain. In December, 2014, CBL announced plans for a multimillion-dollar renovation of Janesville Mall. On October 2, 2015, Dick's Sporting Goods opened in 40,000 square feet of the former J. C. Penney space. On July 27, 2018, CBL sold Janesville Mall to Houston-based RockStep Capital for $18 million, after paying $33 million to buy the mall in 1998.

The Boston Store anchor closed in August 2018 as part of the closure of the entire Bon-Ton department store group. On November 8, 2018, Sears Holdings announced that the Sears anchor and the Sears Auto Center would be closing in February 2019 which left Dick's Sporting Goods and Kohl's as the only anchors left. Unlike the J. C. Penney and Boston Store anchors, Sears owns both the mall anchor and the Auto Center.

== 2020s ==
Janesville Mall was renamed to Uptown Janesville in July 2020.

In 2022, Janesville-based Woodman's Markets proposed adding a 140,000 square feet (13,006 m^{2}) convention center and ice arena to Uptown Janesville in place of the Sears anchor. This building would be known as the Woodman's Sports & Convention Center, abbreviated as the Woodman's Center. Funding for this $50.3 million project came from a variety of sources, including $15 million in American Rescue Plan Act funds, $9 million in private fundraising (including the sale of naming rights), a $5 million federal grant, a $390,000 pledge from the Janesville Jets hockey team, and both $2 million for planning and a construction commitment for $17.3 million from the city of Janesville. After naming rights were sold, the ice arena portion was named the Mercyhealth Arena, while the conference center was named the Robert and Delores Kennedy Conference Center; naming rights to a multipurpose arena space remain available. Woodman's Center officially opened with a ribbon cutting on September 19, 2025. The facility will be managed by Florida-based Sports Facility Management, with a goal to have the facility's calendar 90% booked before it opens.
