= South Main Street Historic District (Janesville, Wisconsin) =

Historic district in Wisconsin, United States

- U.S. National Register of Historic Places
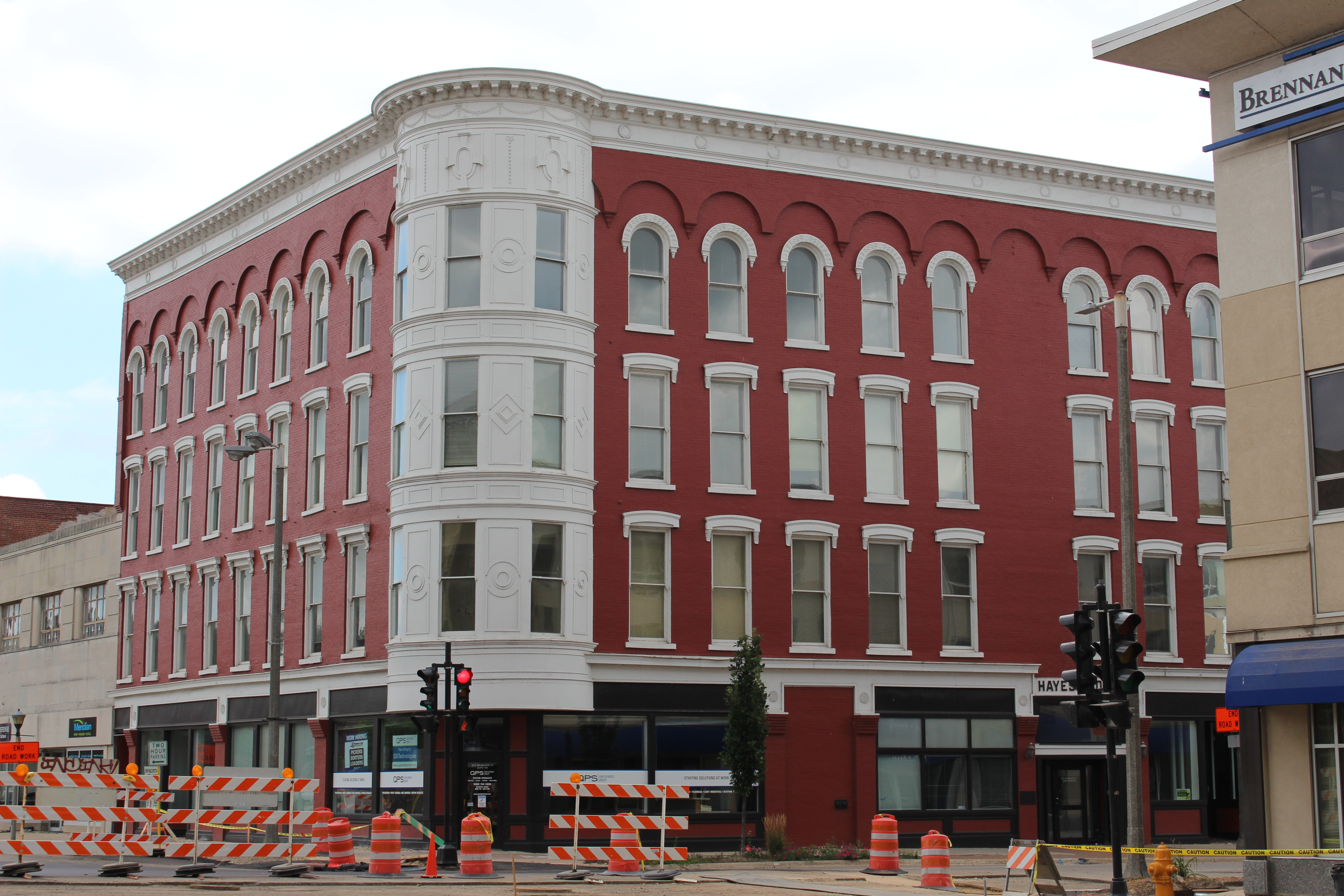
- Lappin-Hayes Block, built 1855 and remodeled in 1899
- Location: Roughly S. Main St. from Milwaukee St. to Rock Co. Courthouse grounds and E. Court St. from Parker Dr. to Rock R., Janesville, Wisconsin
- Area: 3 acres (1.2 ha)
- NRHP reference No.: 90000820
- Added to NRHP: June 1, 1990

The South Main Street Historic District a fairly intact remnant of Janesville, Wisconsin's old downtown east of the Rock River, built in the 19th and early 20th centuries. In 1990 the district was added to the National Register of Historic Places.

== Description ==
Commerce in Janesville began in Henry Janes' cabin, built in 1836, where the Lappin-Hayes block now stands at the intersection of East Milwaukee and Main Streets. From that cabin Janes operated a rustic inn, general store, post office, and a ferry across the Rock River. In 1840 Thomas Lappin built a frame general store on the same site, and in 1855 he built part of the Lappin block that stands today. Over time, other buildings were added around it - some of them in trendy architectural styles.

Many of those stores from the 1800s and early 1900s still remain. Many of the street-level storefronts have been extensively remodeled, but the upper stories often remain very much as built. Here are some good examples of the different styles, in roughly the order built:

- The Bennett-Clapp Block at 12-16 S. Main St is a simple commercial building built in 1851 that suggests the Greek Revival style popular at that time with its regularly-spaced windows with simple lintels and sills. The block was built by Ensign H. Bennett and New Yorker J.F. Clapp. It initially housed Bennett and Bostwick Dry Goods, Tallman and Collins Drug Store, and John I. Spafford Dry Goods. By 1860 Treat and Gregory had a doctors' office upstairs. The Janesville Sack Co. #1 was another occupant.
- The Lappin-Hayes Block block at 2 S. Main St is a 4-story business block built in 1855 in Italianate style, with stores at ground level, a saloon in the basement, and above offices and an 800-seat auditorium called Lappin Hall. In 1899 new owners remodeled the building, adding the central lightwell and making over the exterior in the Queen Anne style that was by then popular.

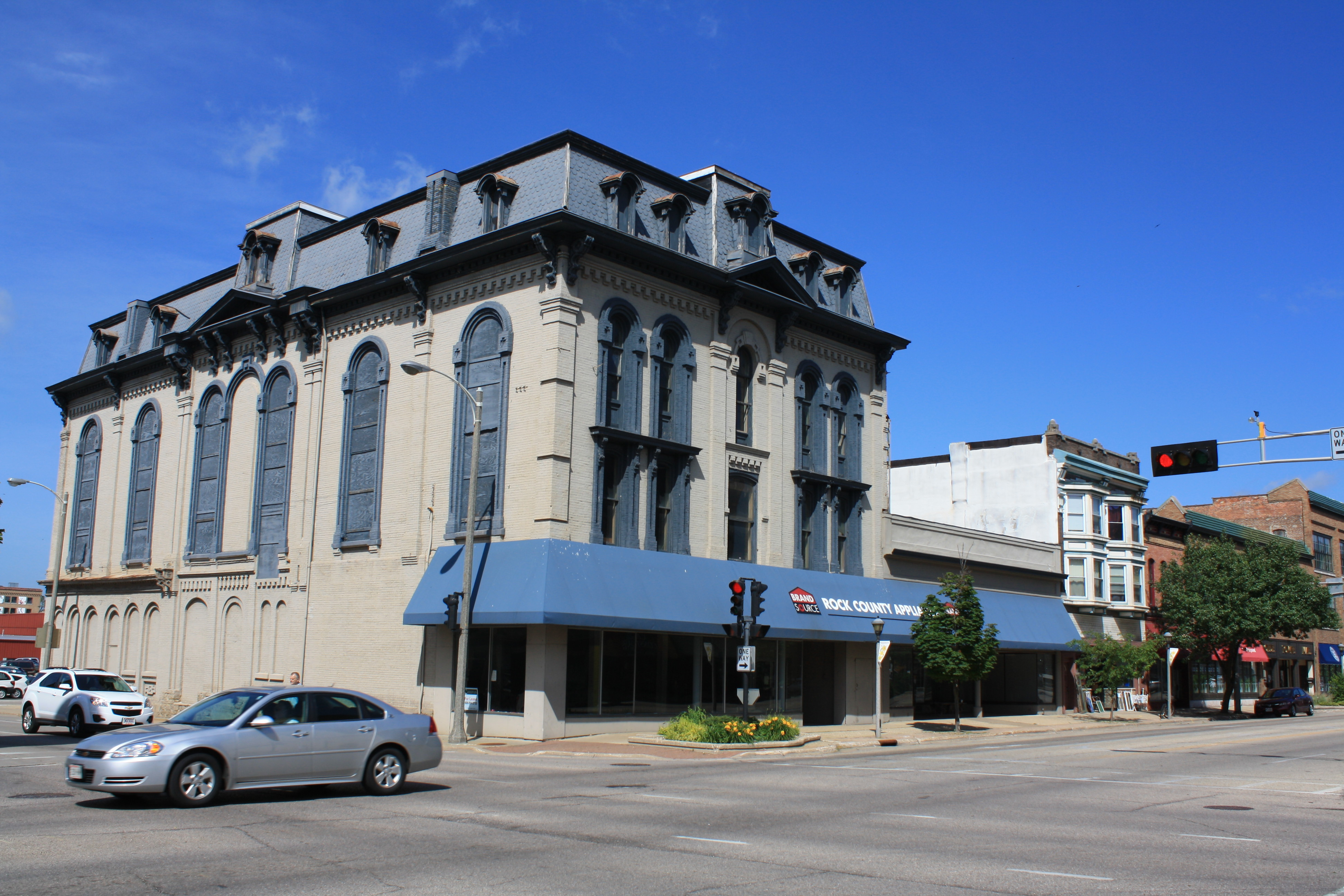
Court Street Methodist Church, Second Empire-style, built 1868

- The Court Street Methodist Church at 38 S Main St was constructed in 1868 by a pragmatic Methodist congregation who designed the street level for commercial tenants while the congregation worshiped above. In 1905 the congregation sold the building to the Masonic Western Star lodge, which stayed there until 1965. J.C. Penney ran a department store in the building from 1920 to 1974. The architectural style of the building is Second Empire, signaled by the mansard roof of the building. The style was popular in the 1860s when the church was built, but is now rather uncommon in Janesville.

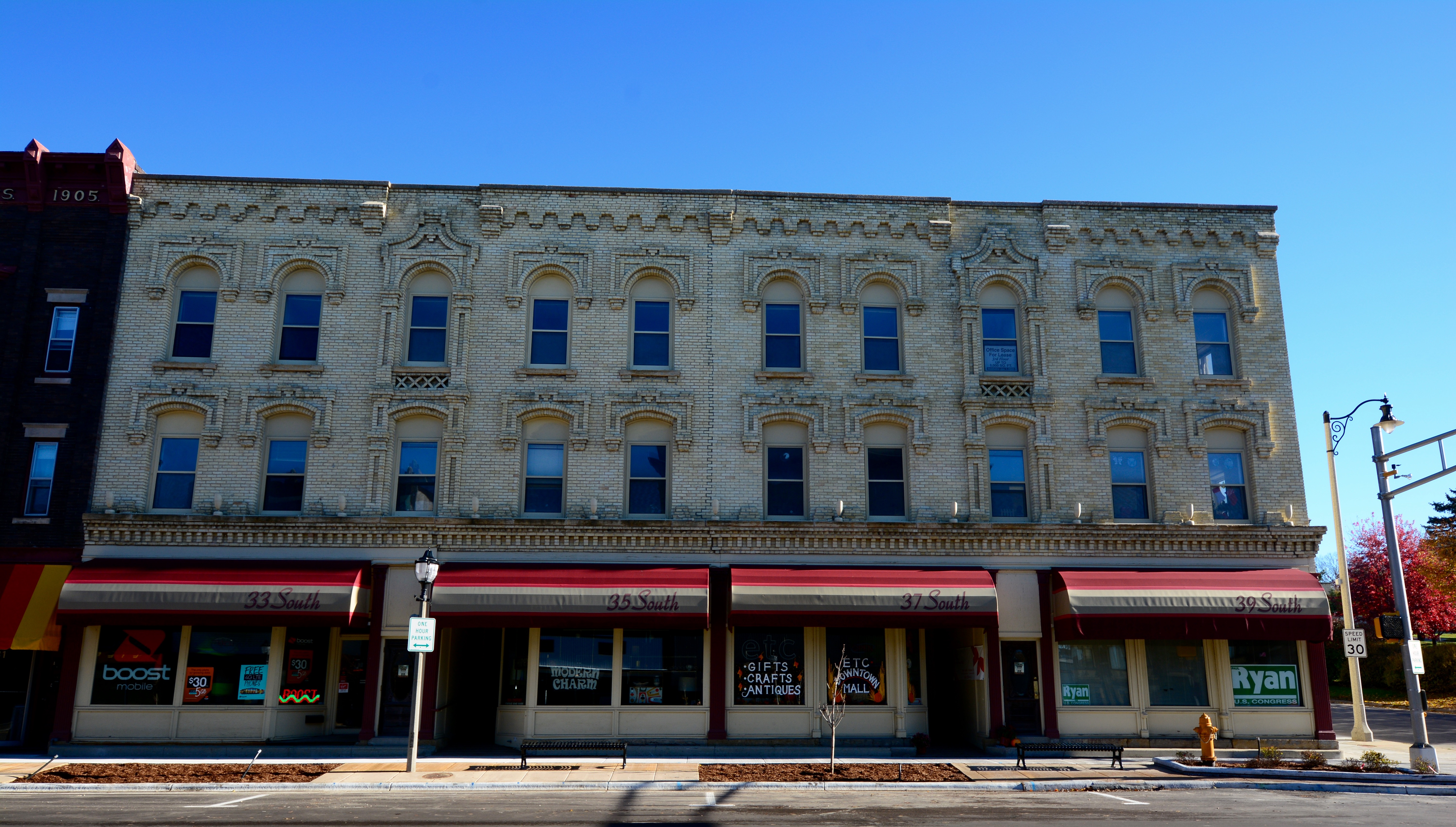
Fredendall Block, Italianate style, built 1868-69

- The Fredendall Block at 33-39 S Main St is a 3-story cream brick commercial-apartment block designed by George F. Schultze and built in 1868-69, after a fire destroyed previous buildings on the site. Hiram J. Baker had one side built and John C. Fredendall the other side. The building's architectural style is Italianate, with the elaborate window hood moulds and cornice typical of that style. The block has housed "harness makers, grocery stores, meat markets, a bike shop, a bakery, ...clothing stores," and the Ryan Funeral Home.
- The Kent Block at 52 S Main St is a 3-story brick commercial block built in 1895. Queen Anne style was the architectural rage then and this building is very much in that style for a commercial building, with the corner turret with pressed metal dome, bay windows, and various surface textures. Over the years the building housed grocery stores and the Janesville Floral Company.

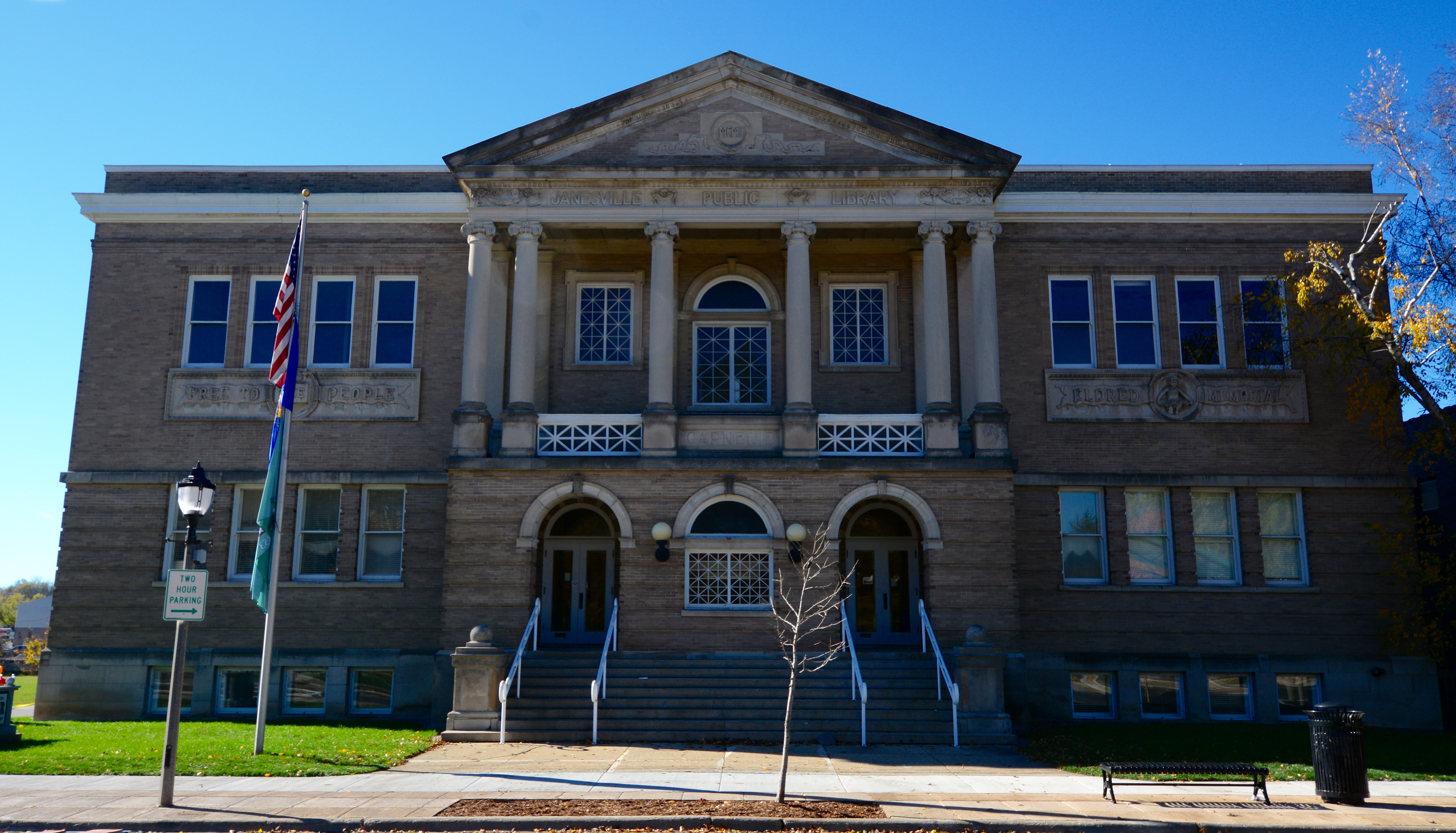
Janesville Public Library, Neoclassical style, built 1902

- The Janesville Public Library at 64 S Main St is a Carnegie library built in 1902. The Neoclassical design is by J. T. W. Jennings, with the raised second-story portico having the columns and pediment of a Greek temple.
- The Schaller Block at 58 S Main St is a 2-story brown brick store built in 1913 in 20 Century Commercial style, with an arched parapet façade, an oriel bay window, and square block decorations which draw from Prairie Style. It has housed a shoe repair shop, a tire shop, a grocery store, and medical offices. The 1911 Woods-Thorne Block at 60 S. Main St is similar.
