= Janesville Public Library (Janesville, Wisconsin) =

- U.S. National Register of Historic Places
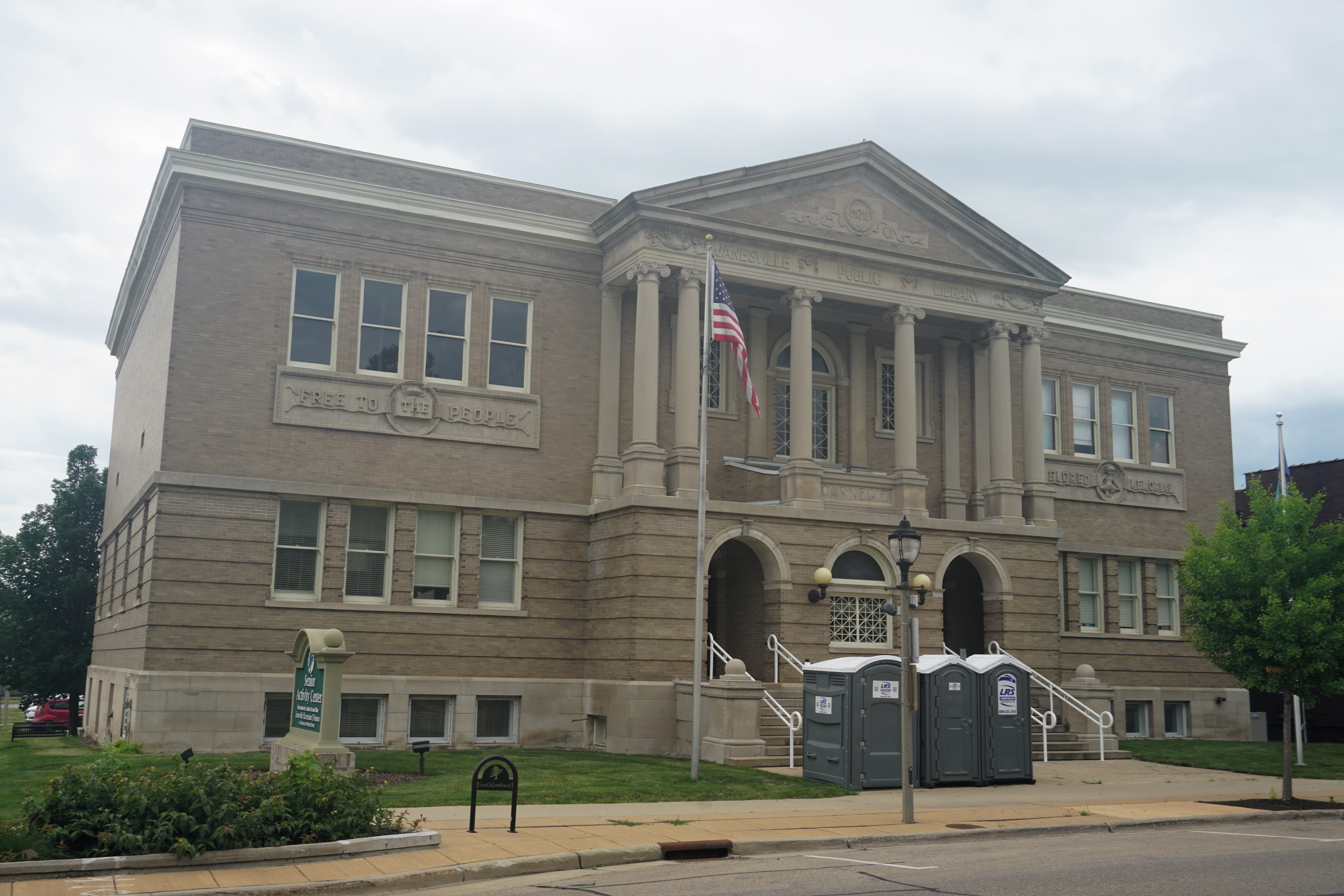
- Janesville Public Library
- Location: 64 S. Main St., Janesville, Wisconsin
- Coordinates: 42°40′53″N 89°01′15″W
- Area: less than one acre
- Built: 1902–1903
- Architect: J. T. W. Jennings
- Architectural style: Neoclassical
- NRHP reference No.: 81000057
- Added to NRHP: July 1, 1981

The Janesville Public Library in Janesville, Wisconsin is a large Neoclassical-styled structure built in 1902. It was one of the first Carnegie libraries in the state, while also supported by local businessman F.S. Eldred. In 1981 the building was added to the National Register of Historic Places.

== History ==
Andrew Carnegie was a Pittsburgh industrialist who made a fortune from his huge Carnegie Steel Company in the late 1800s, but who also wrote that the "man who dies rich dies disgraced." One of his philanthropic ventures was the support of public libraries. Initially he helped fund them in places where he had a connection, but starting in 1898 he began helping fund new libraries nationwide, if the local community would provide the building site and ten percent of the operating costs.

This library was built in 1901 to a Neoclassical design by John T.W. Jennings, who also designed the Dairy Barn and several academic buildings for UW-Madison. Jennings designed a 3-story structure, with the first story clad in rusticated brick, and the second in brick. The front entrance protrudes from the rest of the building, with two round-arched doorways at the first story and Ionic columns and a pediment at the second story, like a Greek temple up in the air. Inside, the library occupied the main floor, with reading room, a research alcove, and a children's room which was finished with a $10,000 donation from local businessman F.S. Eldred in memory of his daughter Ada. The second story housed the assembly hall of the Apollo Club, a local musical group.

In 1932 the second-story auditorium became the home to the Janesville Little Theatre. A stage with classical proscenium was added and the first production was Shakespeare's Twelfth Night, in December of 1932.

The library moved to new quarters in 1968. It has since been used as an auditorium and a senior center. Located in the South Main Street Historic District, it was added to the National Register of Historic Places in 1981.
