= Lincoln–Tallman House =

Historic house in Wisconsin, United States

- Tallman House
- U.S. National Register of Historic Places
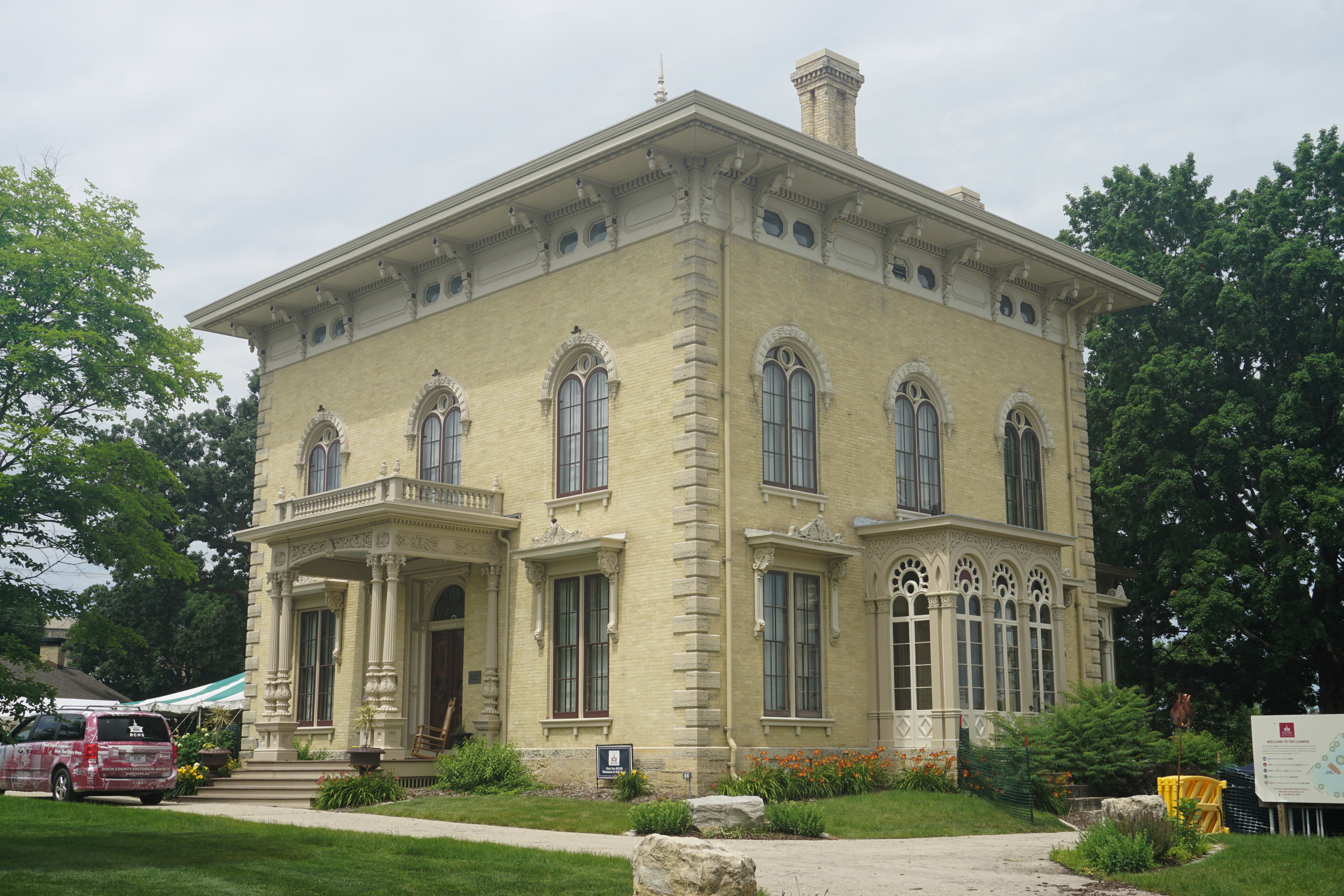

- Location within Wisconsin Location within the United States
- Location: 440 N. Jackson St., Janesville, Wisconsin
- Coordinates: 42°41′10″N 89°1′53″W
- Area: 1.6 acres (0.65 ha)
- Built: 1857
- Architectural style: Italian Villa
- NRHP reference No.: 70000085
- Added to NRHP: October 15, 1970

The Lincoln–Tallman House is a historic Italianate-style house in Janesville, Wisconsin. Built and constructed in 1857 by the Tallman family, the house once hosted overnight guest Abraham Lincoln before he became U.S. president.

== History ==
William Tallman was a lawyer working in the East when he bought 4,476 acres (1,811 ha) of land in Wisconsin Territory in the late 1840s. He was also an abolitionist who had lectured against slavery out east and whose house in Rome, New York had been a station on the Underground Railroad.

Tallman moved his family to Janesville to keep a closer watch on his holdings. Local builder George Barnes began constructing the home in 1855 on a 3-acre (1.2 ha) bluff overlooking the Rock River on what was then the north edge of Janesville. It was designed in the Italianate style. High-quality materials included Cream City brick, cast iron on the windows and black walnut doors with hand-carved panels. It contained many modern conveniences of the time, such as central heating, gas piping installed for lights, running water, walk-in closets with built-in storage drawers and an indoor privy. The original cost was $33,000. Additional work finished in 1870 brought the total to $42,000. The 60 feet (18 m) house has six floors and 20 rooms.

Tallman continued to advocate the abolition of slavery after moving to Janesville. He may have established this house as a station on the Underground Railroad, but it's unclear if any escaped slaves ever passed through it. The Tallman family resided in the house from 1857 to 1915. They donated the house to the city in 1950 on the condition that it be operated as a public museum.

Lincoln visited Janesville October 1–3, 1859, a year before he was elected president. He had come to Rock County from Milwaukee, where he had spoken at the Wisconsin State Fair. William Tallman drove to Beloit to convince Lincoln to visit Janesville and stay at the Tallman house for the evening after a speech in Beloit. Lincoln then gave a speech in Janesville on Saturday, October 1, 1859. He left his boots outside his room at William Tallman's house at night, as was the custom, and didn't find them there in the morning. Because he was embarrassed to leave his room in stocking feet, he missed his train, so Tallman invited him to attend services at First Congregational Church with the family. Lincoln then stayed overnight and caught a train to Chicago on Monday, October 3, 1859. Lincoln's stay at the Tallman house is the only recorded time he stayed in a Wisconsin home.

The house was placed on the National Register of Historic Places on October 15, 1970. It received a Preservation Award from the Victorian Society in America in 1995. It is now owned by the city of Janesville. Operated by the Rock County Historical Society as a museum, it depicts upper class life in the latter half of the 19th century. More than 75% of its furnishings are original to the home.

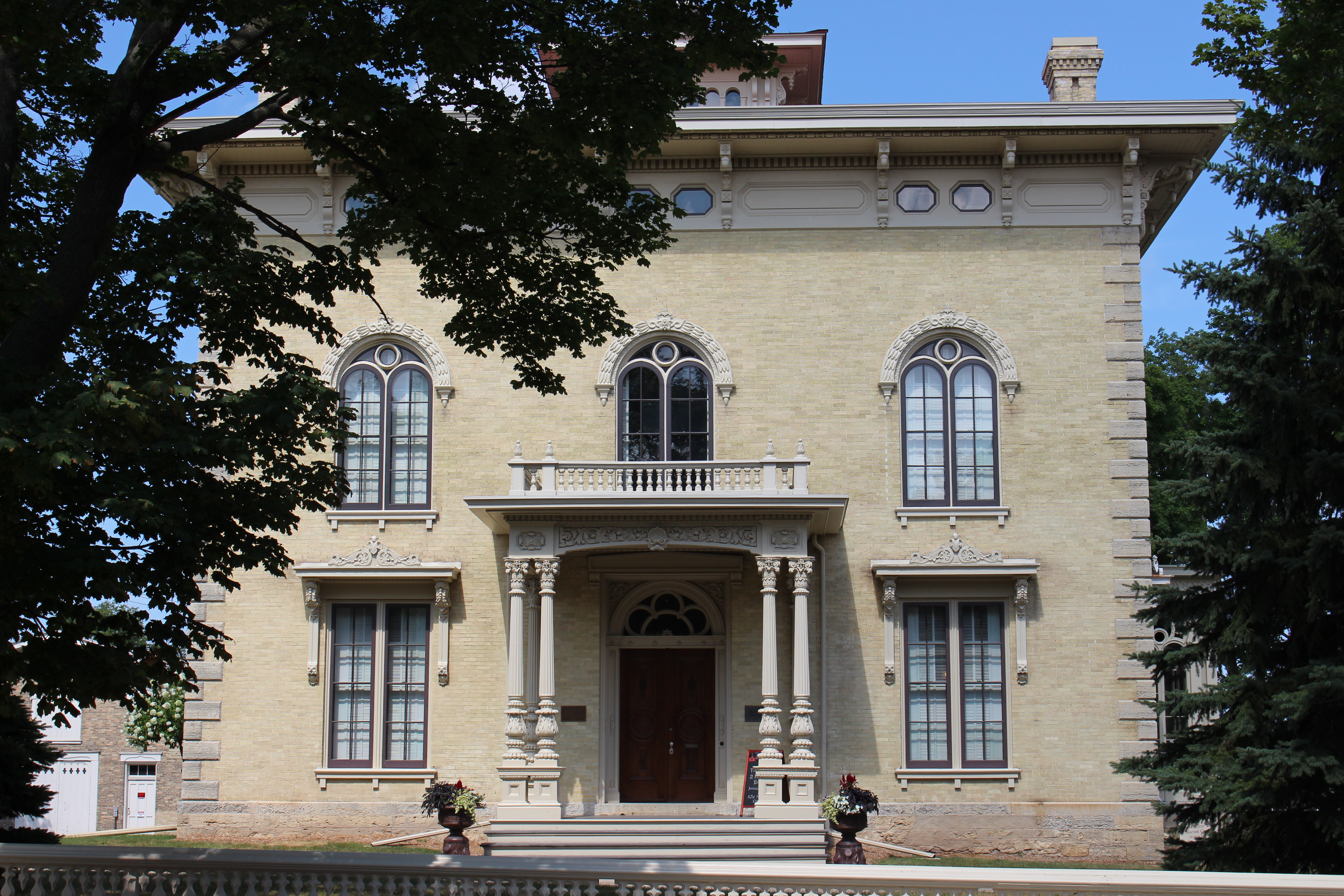

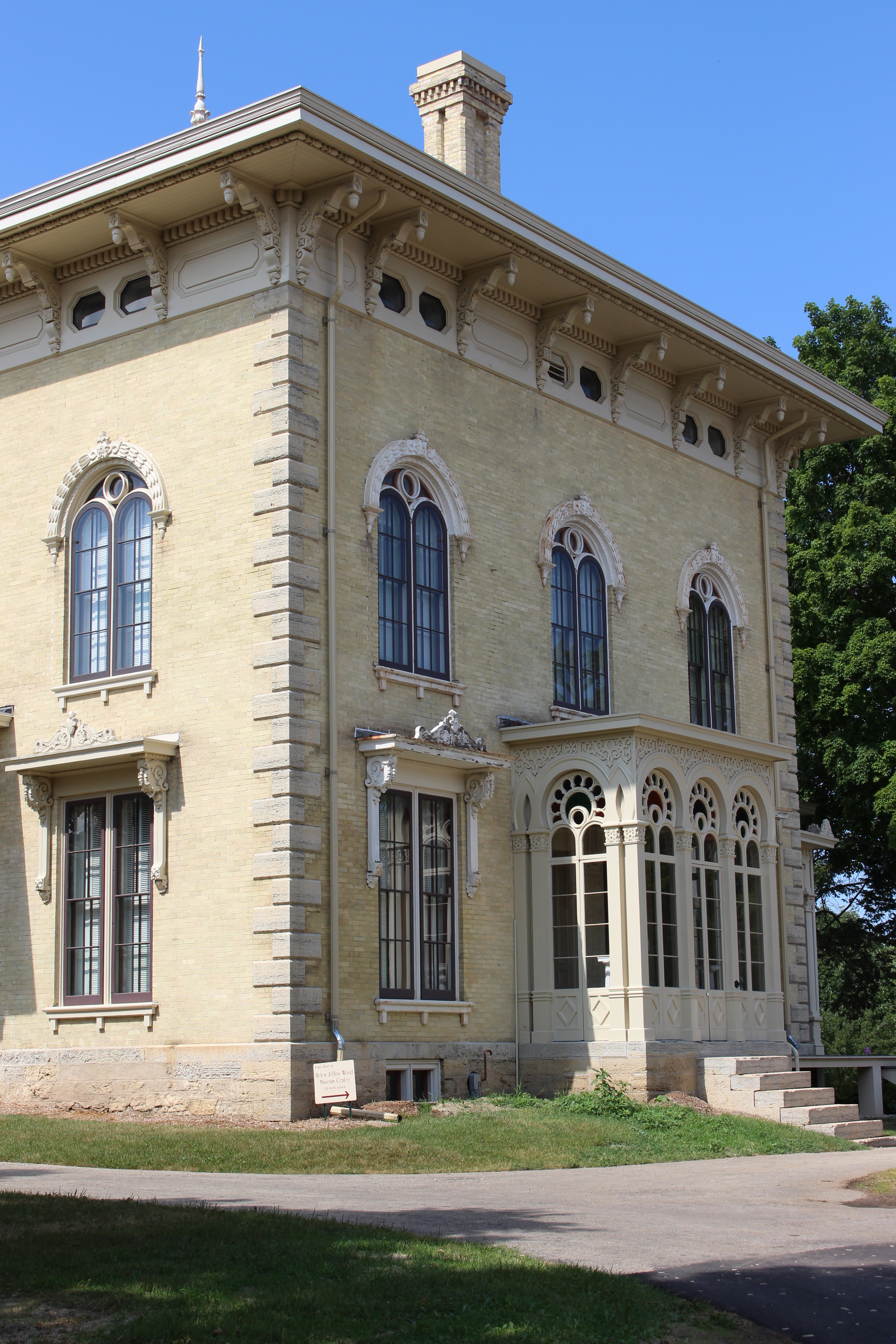

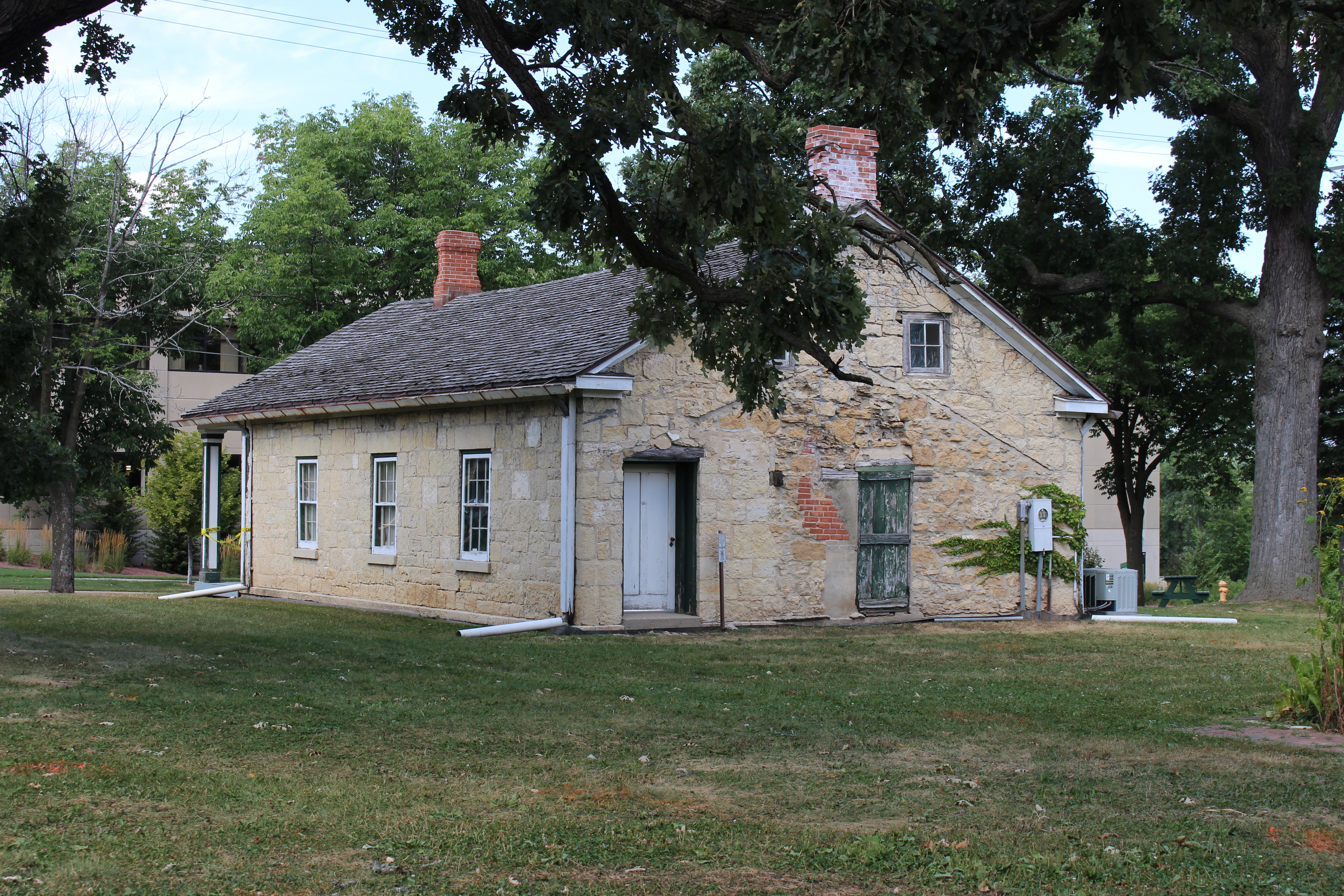
