= Janesville, Wisconsin =

- City
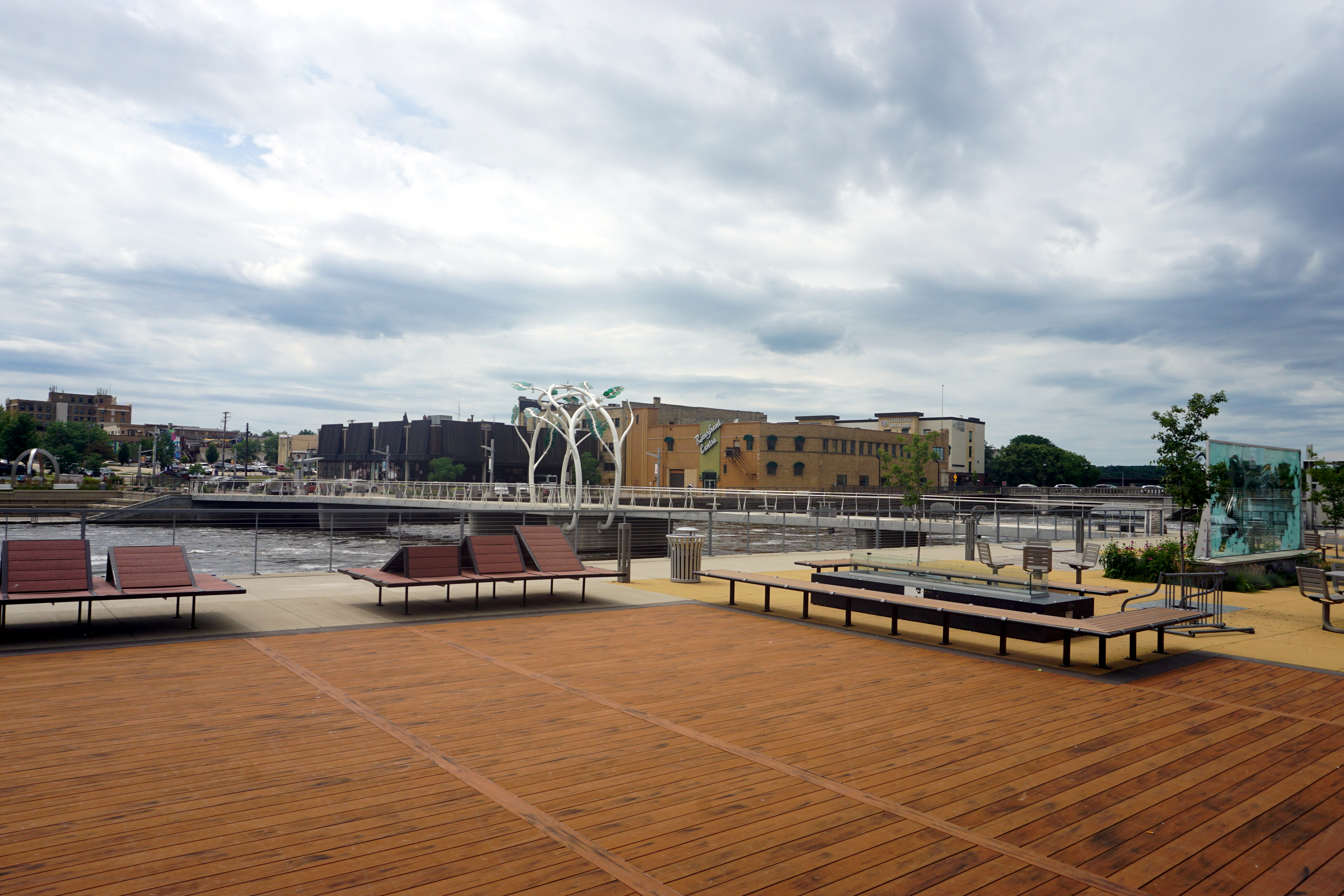
- Town Square in downtown Janesville

- Flag
- Nickname(s): Wisconsin's Park Place, Bower City
- Interactive map of Janesville, Wisconsin
- Location within Wisconsin Location within the United States
- Coordinates: 42.684698°N 89.013170°W
- Country: United States
- State: Wisconsin
- County: Rock
- Established: 1835
- Incorporated: April 12, 1853
- Founder: Henry Janes

Government
  - City Manager: Kevin Lahner
  - Presidents: Aaron Burdick; Larry Squire
  - Councilmembers: Michael Cass; Joshua Erdman; Heather Miller; Richard Neeno; Paul Williams

Area
  - City: 35.246 sq mi (91.287 km^{2})
  - Land: 34.645 sq mi (89.729 km^{2})
  - Water: 0.602 sq mi (1.558 km^{2}) 1.71%
- Elevation: 850 ft (259 m)

Population (2020)
  - City: 65,615
  - Estimate (2024): 66,428
  - Rank: US: 592nd WI: 10th
  - Density: 1,893.9/sq mi (731.26/km^{2})
  - Urban: 72,285 (US: 392nd)
  - Urban density: 1,972/sq mi (761.5/km^{2})
  - Metro: 165,461 (US: 265th)
  - Combined: 939,553 (US: 64th)
- Demonym: Janesvilleites
- Time zone: UTC–6 (Central (CST))
  - Summer (DST): UTC–5 (CDT)
- ZIP Codes: 53545, 53546, 53547, 53548
- Area codes: 608 and 353
- FIPS code: 55-37825
- GNIS feature ID: 1583448
- Website: janesvillewi.gov

Janesville is a city in, and the county seat of Rock County, Wisconsin, United States. The population was 65,615 at the 2020 census, and was estimated at 66,428 in 2024, making it the tenth-most populous city in Wisconsin. The Janesville–Beloit Metropolitan statistical area, consisting solely of Rock County, has an estimated 165,461 residents in the 2024 estimate. It is located along the Rock River in southern Wisconsin.

== History ==
The area that became Janesville was the site of a Ho-Chunk village named Įnį poroporo (Round Rock) up to the time of Euro-American settlement. In the 1825 Treaty of Prairie du Chien, the United States recognized the portion of the present city that lies west of the Rock River as Ho-Chunk territory, while the area east of the river was recognized as Potawatomi land. Following the Indian Removal Act of 1830 and the Black Hawk War of 1832, both nations were forced to surrender this land to the United States.

American settlers John Inman, George Follmer, Joshua Holmes, and William Holmes Jr. built a crude log cabin in the region in 1835. Later that year, one key settler, Henry F. Janes, a native of Virginia who was a self-proclaimed woodsman and early city planner, arrived in what is now Rock County. Janes initially wanted to name the budding village "Blackhawk," after the famous Sauk leader, Chief Black Hawk, but was turned down by Post Office officials. After some discussion, it was settled that the town would be named after Janes himself and thus, in 1835, Janesville was founded.

Despite being named after a Virginian, Janesville was founded by old stock Yankee immigrants, descended from the English Puritans who settled New England in the 1600s. The completion of the Erie Canal caused a surge in New Englander immigration to what was then the Northwest Territory. Some of them were from upstate New York, and had parents who had moved to that region from New England shortly after the Revolutionary War. New Englanders, and New England transplants from upstate New York, were the vast majority of Janesville's inhabitants during the first several decades of its history. Land surveys encouraged pioneers to settle in the area among the abundance of fertile farmland and woodlands. Many of these early settlers established farms and began cultivating wheat and other grains.

Some of the key settlers hailed from the burned-over district of western New York State, (an area notable for being a part of the Christian revival movement known as the Second Great Awakening). Some of those in that revival movement were also active in the abolitionist and women's rights movements. One of the settlers in Janesville was William Tallman, who hailed from Rome, New York. Tallman came to the area in 1850 and bought up large tracts of land in hopes of inspiring his fellow New Yorkers to settle in the fertile Rock County. He established himself as one of the most influential and affluent members of the budding Janesville populace. He was passionate about the call for abolition and became a supporter of the Republican Party. One of the crowning moments in Tallman's life was when he convinced the up-and-coming Illinois Republican, Abraham Lincoln, to speak in Janesville in 1859. The Tallman house is now a historical landmark, and best known as "The place where Abraham Lincoln slept." As the population grew in the Janesville area, several new industries began cropping up along the Rock River, including flour and lumber mills. The first dam was built in 1844.

Janesville was very active during the Civil War. Local farms sold grains to the Union army, and Rock County was one of the counties in Wisconsin with the highest number of men enlisted. Thomas H. Ruger, of Janesville, served in the war, along with his brothers, Edward, William, and Henry, and he rose to the rank of brigadier general. Ruger later served as military governor of Georgia, and commandant of West Point. He is memorialized at Fort Ruger in Diamond Head, Hawaii.

After the Civil War, Janesville's agriculture continued to surge and a greater demand for new farming technology led to the development of several foundries and farm machine manufacturers in the area, including the Janesville Machine Company, and the Rock River Iron Works. With the boom in the farm service sector and establishment of a rail system, Janesville soon began to ship goods to and from prominent eastern cities, including New York, Boston, and Philadelphia. After decades of rigorous grain farming, the soil quality around Janesville began to degrade. Farmers responded to this by planting tobacco, which became one of the most profitable and prolific crops grown in Wisconsin during the late 19th century.

Another development during the mid-19th century was the establishment of a women's rights movement in Janesville. The movement was founded in the 1850s and continued after the Civil War. One of the key focuses of the group during the 1870s was the Temperance movement.

In the late 1880s, German immigrants began to arrive in Janesville in large numbers (making up less than 5% of the town before this time). They were the largest non-English-speaking group to settle there. Unlike in some other areas, in Janesville, they experienced virtually no hostility or xenophobia. Janesville's founding English-Puritan-descended Yankee population welcomed them with open arms, with many writing back to relatives in Germany enthusiastically. This led to chain migration which increased the German population of the town. Only one German-language newspaper was founded in the town; it was known as The Janesville Journal, and began in 1889, printing for only a few years.

In the late 19th and early 20th centuries, the Milwaukee Road and Chicago and North Western railroads had freight and passenger rail connections to the city. Passenger rail service continued until 1971.

One of the key developments in Janesville's history was the establishment of a General Motors plant in 1919. The plant was initially established to produce Samson tractors, a company acquired by GM co-founder William C. Durant. Durant was encouraged by Joseph Craig, the president of Janesville Machine, to build a plant to produce the Samson tractors in Janesville, to which Durant agreed. In the years following World War I, the demand for tractors plummeted and the plant shifted its focus to the production of automobiles.

One of the most prominent turns of the century figures in Janesville was George Parker, who developed new pen technologies and styles and eventually established the Parker Pen Company. His developments included the "lucky curve" ink feed system and the "trench pen"—a pen commissioned by the U.S. Army for use in World War I. Parker designed and established a headquarters and factory in downtown Janesville. The Parker Pen Company was handed down to George's son, Ken, who developed the revolutionary "Parker 51" in the 1940s. A Parker pen was used by Dwight D. Eisenhower to sign Germany's Armistice agreement to end World War II in Europe, and subsequently General Douglas MacArthur used his 20-year-old Parker Duofold in the signing of Japan's surrender at the end of the War in the Pacific. The Parker Pen Company was one of the top employers in the area for over 70 years. The company was eventually sold off in a leveraged buyout in the 1980s.

Another important figure in Janesville's history was John Nolen, who was hired by the city in 1919. Nolen was a city planner who saw the Rock River as a focal point for community and park development. His park planning established Janesville as the "City of Parks."

Janesville was the site of the first Wisconsin State Fair in 1851, attended by approximately 10,000 people.

A tree that once stood in downtown Courthouse Park was the site of a lynch mob that, on their second attempt, having been rebuffed by an opposing crowd the day before, hanged a convicted murderer in 1859. Janesville had a "Peace Park" with a playground and a peace pole, which when constructed was the tallest in the world and is now the second tallest.

Janesville developed its first flag in 2015 in a design contest held in Janesville's schools. The flag represents the community's past, present, and future, with 1853 representing the year Janesville was incorporated, four stars symbolizing the city's four original wards, a green background standing for the community's agricultural industry, and black representing both the rich soil for which Janesville is known, and the smoke that billowed from smokestacks as the community developed a manufacturing economy. The tree in the center is the city's logo, representing Janesville's slogan, "Wisconsin's Park Place."

== Geography ==
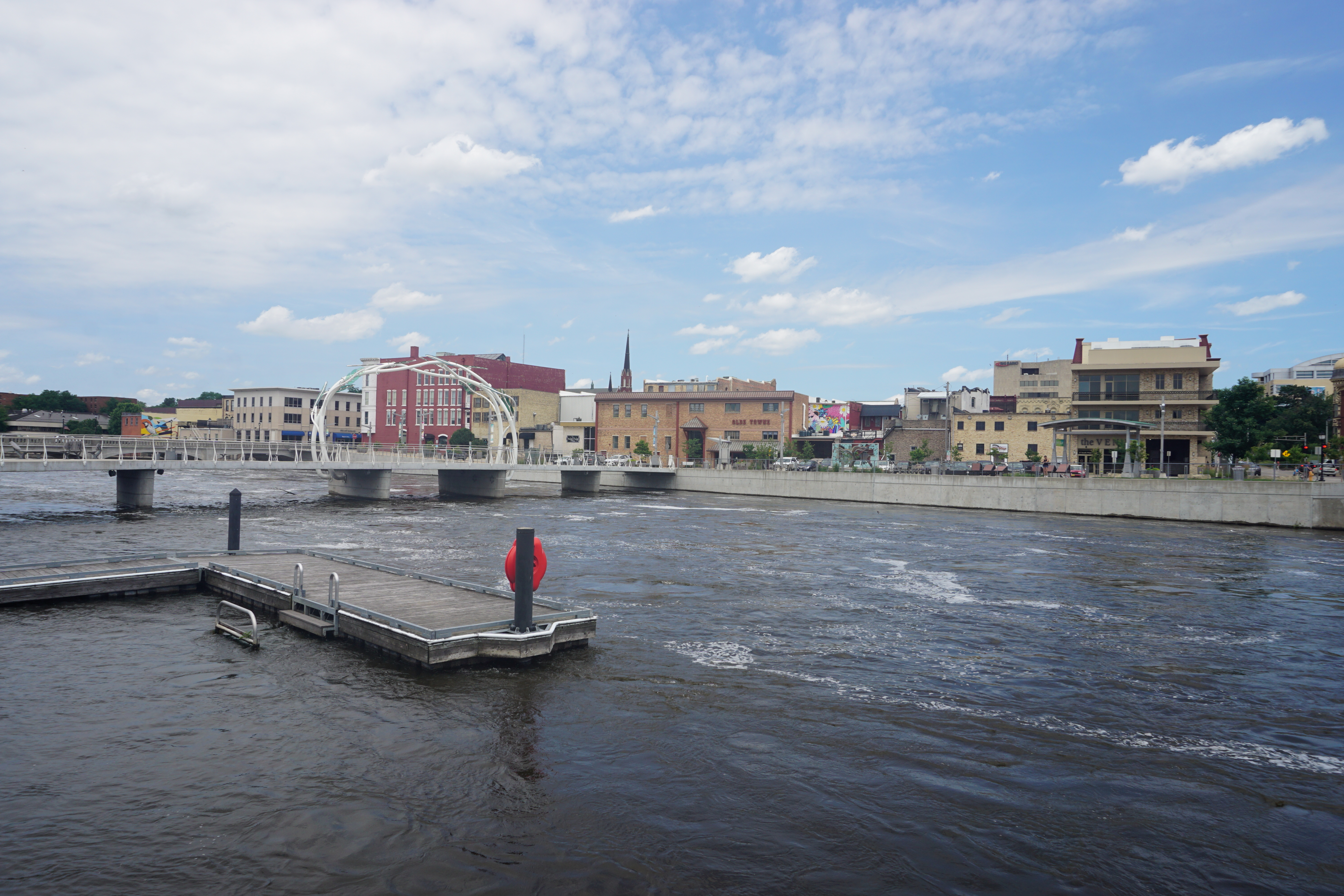
Rock River in downtown Janesville

According to the United States Census Bureau, the city has a total area of 35.246 square miles (91.29 km^{2}), of which 34.644 square miles (89.73 km^{2}) is land and 0.602 square miles (1.56 km^{2}) (1.71%) is water. The city is divided by the Rock River.

=== Climate ===
Like the rest of Wisconsin, the climate is humid continental, but its location is in the transition from warm to warm summers in the eastern and northern part of Wisconsin. Nowadays, the city is the first choice, i.e. Dfa for Köppen classification where the hot season may not be so comfortable at times, although surges in the outskirts without UHI are in the Dfb zone. The city is at 5a / 5b in the USDA Plant Hardiness Zone.

Climate data for Janesville, Wisconsin, 1991–2020 normals, extremes 1893–present
| Month | Jan | Feb | Mar | Apr | May | Jun | Jul | Aug | Sep | Oct | Nov | Dec | Year |
|---|---|---|---|---|---|---|---|---|---|---|---|---|---|
| Record high °F (°C) | 60 (16) | 74 (23) | 83 (28) | 91 (33) | 96 (36) | 101 (38) | 103 (39) | 102 (39) | 101 (38) | 89 (32) | 78 (26) | 67 (19) | 103 (39) |
| Mean maximum °F (°C) | 48.7 (9.3) | 53.0 (11.7) | 68.1 (20.1) | 79.1 (26.2) | 86.9 (30.5) | 92.0 (33.3) | 93.0 (33.9) | 92.1 (33.4) | 89.3 (31.8) | 81.8 (27.7) | 66.1 (18.9) | 52.2 (11.2) | 95.2 (35.1) |
| Mean daily maximum °F (°C) | 28.3 (−2.1) | 32.4 (0.2) | 44.6 (7.0) | 57.9 (14.4) | 69.9 (21.1) | 79.9 (26.6) | 83.4 (28.6) | 81.7 (27.6) | 75.1 (23.9) | 61.7 (16.5) | 46.3 (7.9) | 33.5 (0.8) | 57.9 (14.4) |
| Daily mean °F (°C) | 19.9 (−6.7) | 23.5 (−4.7) | 35.0 (1.7) | 47.0 (8.3) | 58.9 (14.9) | 68.9 (20.5) | 72.6 (22.6) | 70.6 (21.4) | 63.0 (17.2) | 50.6 (10.3) | 37.4 (3.0) | 25.8 (−3.4) | 47.8 (8.8) |
| Mean daily minimum °F (°C) | 11.6 (−11.3) | 14.7 (−9.6) | 25.7 (−3.5) | 36.1 (2.3) | 48.0 (8.9) | 58.0 (14.4) | 61.7 (16.5) | 59.5 (15.3) | 51.0 (10.6) | 39.5 (4.2) | 28.5 (−1.9) | 18.1 (−7.7) | 37.7 (3.2) |
| Mean minimum °F (°C) | −10.4 (−23.6) | −6.3 (−21.3) | 5.9 (−14.5) | 22.9 (−5.1) | 34.1 (1.2) | 45.0 (7.2) | 51.6 (10.9) | 49.7 (9.8) | 37.5 (3.1) | 26.4 (−3.1) | 13.3 (−10.4) | −2.6 (−19.2) | −14.7 (−25.9) |
| Record low °F (°C) | −30 (−34) | −31 (−35) | −13 (−25) | 5 (−15) | 17 (−8) | 32 (0) | 41 (5) | 40 (4) | 27 (−3) | 11 (−12) | −17 (−27) | −25 (−32) | −31 (−35) |
| Average precipitation inches (mm) | 1.63 (41) | 1.61 (41) | 2.06 (52) | 3.57 (91) | 4.09 (104) | 4.99 (127) | 4.19 (106) | 4.34 (110) | 3.73 (95) | 2.99 (76) | 2.33 (59) | 1.90 (48) | 37.43 (950) |
| Average snowfall inches (cm) | 10.8 (27) | 10.1 (26) | 4.1 (10) | 1.3 (3.3) | 0.0 (0.0) | 0.0 (0.0) | 0.0 (0.0) | 0.0 (0.0) | 0.0 (0.0) | 0.2 (0.51) | 2.4 (6.1) | 7.7 (20) | 36.6 (92.91) |
| Average precipitation days (≥ 0.01 in) | 10.1 | 8.7 | 9.7 | 12.4 | 13.2 | 12.7 | 10.4 | 10.2 | 10.1 | 10.2 | 9.3 | 9.7 | 126.7 |
| Average snowy days (≥ 0.1 in) | 6.6 | 5.1 | 2.8 | 0.7 | 0.0 | 0.0 | 0.0 | 0.0 | 0.0 | 0.1 | 1.2 | 5.1 | 21.6 |
Source 1: NOAA
Source 2: National Weather Service

== Demographics ==
Historical population
| Census | Pop. | Note | %± |
|---|---|---|---|
| 1860 | 7,703 | | — |
| 1870 | 8,789 | | 14.1% |
| 1880 | 9,018 | | 2.6% |
| 1890 | 10,836 | | 20.2% |
| 1900 | 13,185 | | 21.7% |
| 1910 | 13,894 | | 5.4% |
| 1920 | 18,293 | | 31.7% |
| 1930 | 21,628 | | 18.2% |
| 1940 | 22,992 | | 6.3% |
| 1950 | 24,899 | | 8.3% |
| 1960 | 35,164 | | 41.2% |
| 1970 | 46,426 | | 32.0% |
| 1980 | 51,071 | | 10.0% |
| 1990 | 52,133 | | 2.1% |
| 2000 | 59,498 | | 14.1% |
| 2010 | 63,575 | | 6.9% |
| 2020 | 65,615 | | 3.2% |
| 2024 (est.) | 66,428 | | 1.2% |
U.S. Decennial Census; 2020 Census

According to realtor website Zillow, the average price of a home as of November 30, 2025, in Janesville is $278,849.

As of the 2024 American Community Survey, there are 29,204 estimated households in Janesville with an average of 2.25 persons per household. The city has a median household income of $66,853. Approximately 7.2% of the city's population lives at or below the poverty line. Janesville has an estimated 65.5% employment rate, with 26.6% of the population holding a bachelor's degree or higher and 92.3% holding a high school diploma. There were 30,223 housing units at an average density of 872.39 per square mile (336.8/km^{2}).

The median age in the city was 41.1 years.

=== Racial and ethnic composition ===
Janesville, Wisconsin – racial and ethnic composition Note: the US Census treats Hispanic/Latino as an ethnic category. This table excludes Latinos from the racial categories and assigns them to a separate category. Hispanics/Latinos may be of any race.
| Race / ethnicity (NH = non-Hispanic) | Pop 1990 | Pop 2000 | Pop 2010 | Pop 2020 | % 1990 | % 2000 | % 2010 | % 2020 |
|---|---|---|---|---|---|---|---|---|
| White alone (NH) | 50,729 | 55,840 | 56,465 | 54,455 | 97.31% | 93.85% | 88.82% | 82.99% |
| Black or African American alone (NH) | 282 | 726 | 1,574 | 2,150 | 0.54% | 1.22% | 2.48% | 3.28% |
| Native American or Alaska Native alone (NH) | 108 | 134 | 149 | 143 | 0.21% | 0.23% | 0.23% | 0.22% |
| Asian alone (NH) | 400 | 570 | 846 | 1,060 | 0.77% | 0.96% | 1.33% | 1.62% |
| Native Hawaiian or Pacific Islander alone (NH) | — | 17 | 21 | 18 | — | 0.03% | 0.03% | 0.03% |
| Other race alone (NH) | 17 | 45 | 39 | 167 | 0.03% | 0.08% | 0.06% | 0.25% |
| Mixed race or multiracial (NH) | — | 597 | 1,060 | 2,896 | — | 1.00% | 1.67% | 4.41% |
| Hispanic or Latino (any race) | 597 | 1,569 | 3,421 | 4,726 | 1.15% | 2.64% | 5.38% | 7.20% |
| Total | 52,133 | 59,498 | 63,575 | 65,615 | 100.00% | 100.00% | 100.00% | 100.00% |

=== 2024 estimate ===
As of the 2024 estimate, there were 66,428 people, 29,204 households, and _ families residing in the city. The population density was 1,917.45 inhabitants per square mile (740.3/km^{2}). There were 30,223 housing units at an average density of 872.39 per square mile (336.8/km^{2}). The racial makeup of the city was 86.8% White (85.3% NH White), 3.2% African American, 0.4% Native American, 1.6% Asian, 0.0% Pacific Islander, _% from some other races and 5.6% from two or more races. Hispanic or Latino people of any race were 6.2% of the population.

=== 2020 census ===
As of the 2020 census, there were 65,615 people, 27,170 households, and 16,979 families in Janesville, with a population density of 1,920.81 inhabitants per square mile (741.6/km^{2}). The median age was 39.8 years; 22.5% of residents were under the age of 18 and 17.7% were 65 years of age or older. For every 100 females there were 96.5 males, and for every 100 females age 18 and over there were 93.3 males age 18 and over.

98.8% of residents lived in urban areas, while 1.2% lived in rural areas.

Among households, 28.7% had children under the age of 18 living in them. Of all households, 43.7% were married-couple households, 18.8% were households with a male householder and no spouse or partner present, and 28.1% were households with a female householder and no spouse or partner present. About 30.2% of all households were made up of individuals and 12.4% had someone living alone who was 65 years of age or older.

There were 28,430 housing units at an average density of 832.26 per square mile (321.3/km^{2}), of which 4.4% were vacant. The homeowner vacancy rate was 0.8% and the rental vacancy rate was 4.7%.

Racial composition as of the 2020 census
| Race | Number | Percent |
|---|---|---|
| White | 55,645 | 84.8% |
| Black or African American | 2,190 | 3.3% |
| American Indian and Alaska Native | 274 | 0.4% |
| Asian | 1,083 | 1.7% |
| Native Hawaiian and Other Pacific Islander | 35 | 0.1% |
| Some other race | 1,927 | 2.9% |
| Two or more races | 4,461 | 6.8% |
| Hispanic or Latino (of any race) | 4,726 | 7.2% |

According to the American Community Survey estimates for 2016–2020, the median income for a household in the city was $55,914, and the median income for a family was $70,805. Male full-time workers had a median income of $50,034 versus $41,998 for female workers. The per capita income for the city was $30,041. About 8.1% of families and 11.3% of the population were below the poverty line, including 14.9% of those under age 18 and 13.3% of those age 65 or over. Of the population age 25 and over, 93.1% were high school graduates or higher and 25.2% had a bachelor's degree or higher.

=== 2010 census ===
As of the 2010 census, there were 63,575 people, 25,828 households, and 16,718 families residing in the city. The population density was 1,877.58 inhabitants per square mile (724.9/km^{2}). There were 27,996 housing units at an average density of 826.82 per square mile (319.2/km^{2}). The racial makeup of the city was 91.70% White, 2.57% African American, 0.29% Native American, 1.35% Asian, 0.03% Pacific Islander, 1.96% from some other races and 2.09% from two or more races. Hispanic or Latino people of any race were 5.38% of the population.

There were 25,828 households, 30.4% had children under the age of 18 living in them, 46.6% were married couples living together, 12.7% had a female householder with no husband present, and 35.3% were non-families. 28.2% of all households were made up of individuals, with 10.6% individuals aged 65 years or older. The average household size was 2.43 and the average family size was 2.95.

In the city, the population was spread out, with 21.8% under the age of 18, and 13.9% who were 65 years of age or older. The median age was 37.1 years.

=== Religion ===
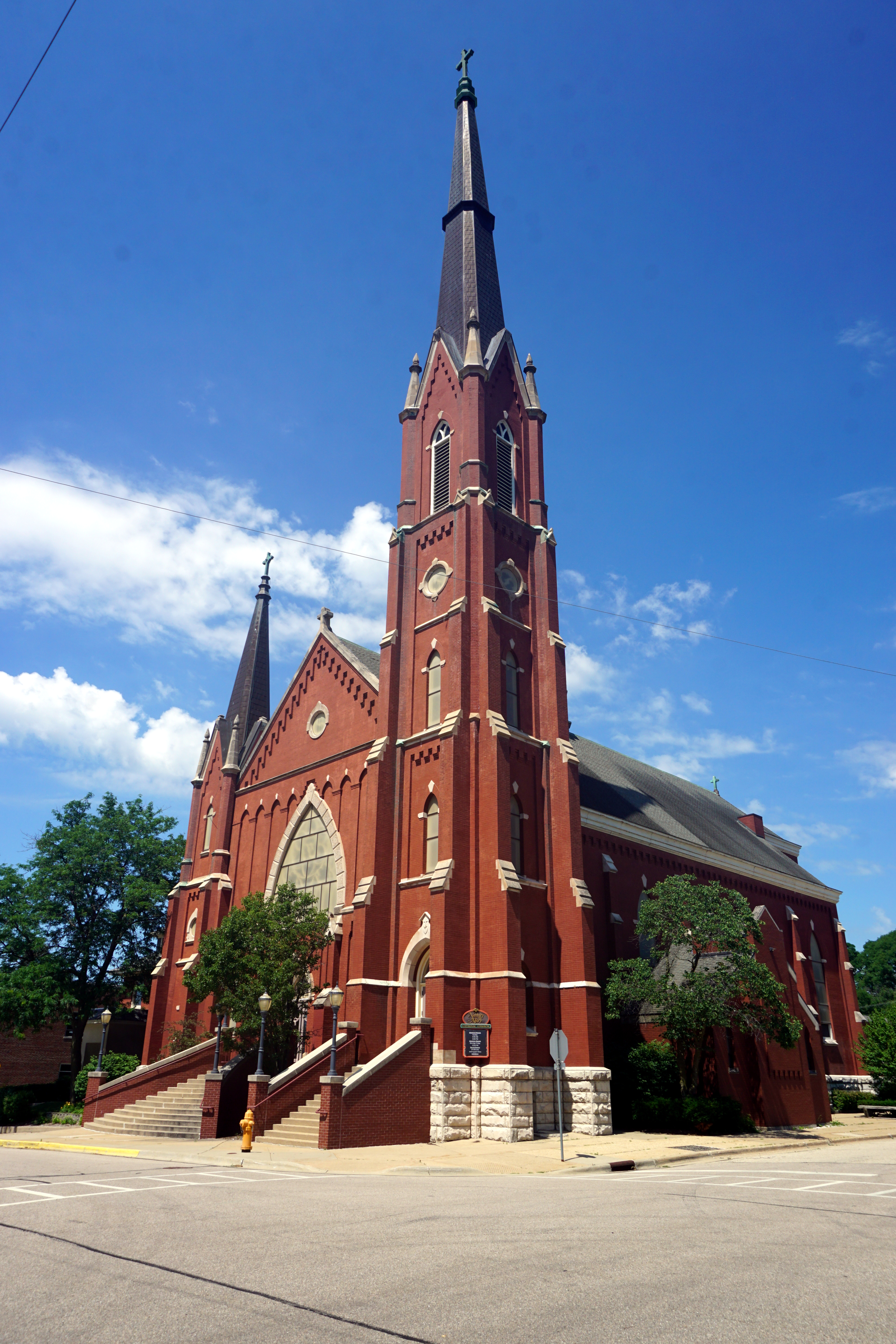
Nativity of Mary Parish

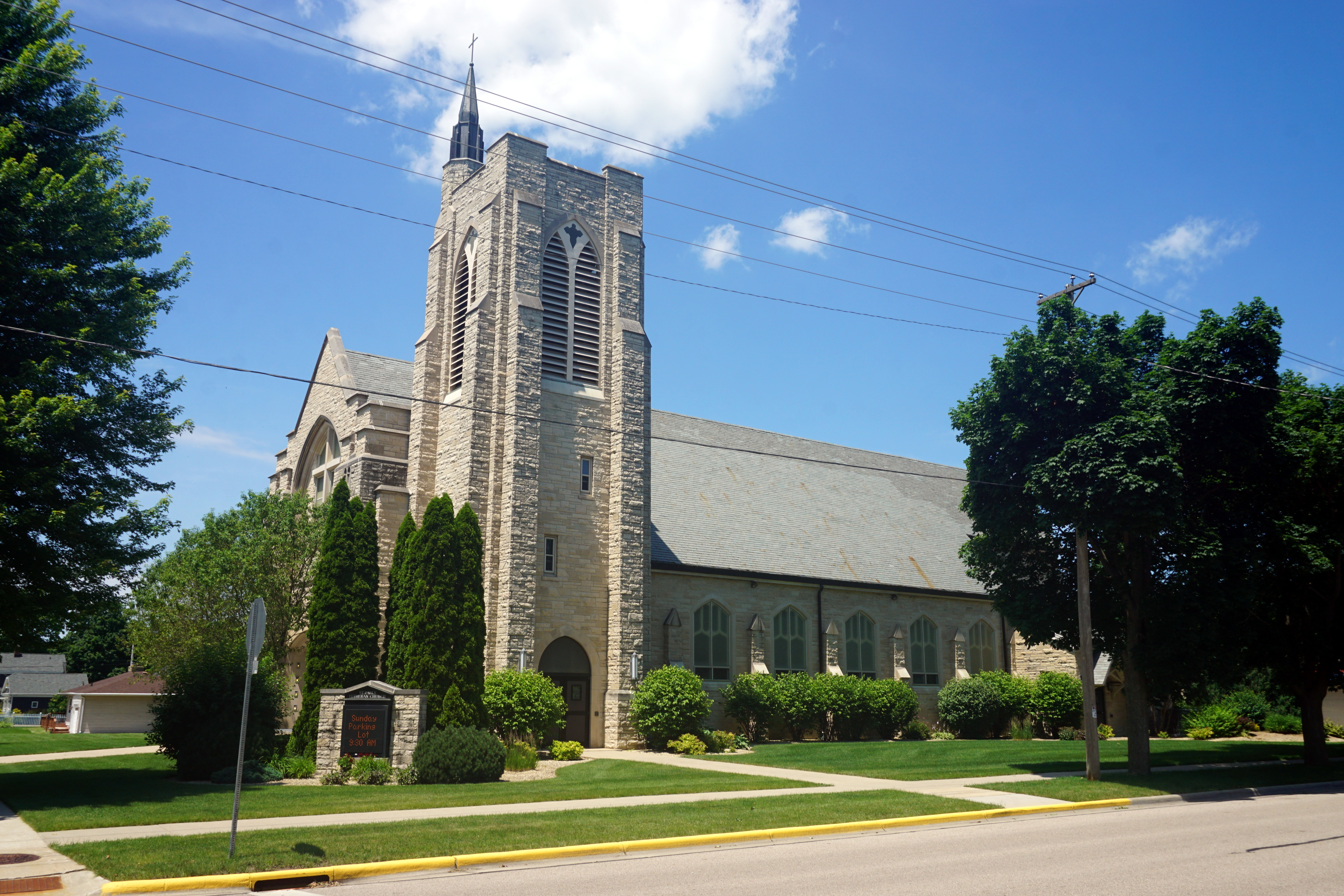
St. Paul's Lutheran Church

There are four Roman Catholic parishes in Janesville, all part of the Diocese of Madison. The oldest is St. Patrick's, established in a log chapel in 1844 when there were only six Catholic families in Janesville. A priest arrived in March 1845 and celebrated Mass. St. Patrick's present church was built of cream-colored brick in 1863 and is located at 315 Cherry Street. Located on a hill near the center of town, the architecturally prominent Nativity of Mary church (St. Mary's) was organized in 1876 by German immigrants who wanted a parish of their own. The present red brick structure was completed in 1902. The remaining two Janesville parishes are St. John Vianney, located on East Racine Street, and St. William on the near west side.

The city is also home to other Christian churches including Lutheran, Methodist, Episcopalian, Baptist, and others. The First Baptist Church of Janesville was organized October 13, 1844, and founded by the Rev. Jeremiah Murphy. The Seventh Day Baptist General Conference has its offices in Janesville; the denomination's nearest church is in nearby Milton. All Saints Anglican Catholic Church a part of the continuing Anglican movement, is located in a historic church near downtown that was built by German Lutherans in the 1880s.

There are four cemeteries in Janesville: Oakhill, a municipal cemetery, Mount Olivet, a Roman Catholic cemetery, Dillenbeck Cemetery, and Milton Lawns, a non-demominational private cemetery.

The Gideon Bible organization was founded at the Janesville YMCA in 1899 by Janesville resident John H. Nicholson and a Beloit man after they had shared a Boscobel hotel room.

Janesville has a mosque.

== Economy ==
Businesses headquartered in Janesville include Impact Confections, a candy maker; Blain's Farm & Fleet, a four-state retail chain; Woodman's Markets, a regional supermarket chain that built its first store in Janesville; Swing'n'Slide, a maker of wood-and-plastic playground equipment; Hufcor (formerly Hough Shade Company), a manufacturer of room dividers that markets internationally; and Gray's Brewing, maker of boutique beers and soft drinks.

From 1919 until 2008, Janesville was the site of the Janesville Assembly Plant. Founded in 1919, when General Motors bought the Janesville Machine Company and merged it with the Samson Tractor Company, the Janesville plant was the oldest General Motors plant in North America prior to its closing. It assembled light-duty trucks and sport utility vehicles, which declined in popularity as gasoline prices increased. The plant closed in December 2008. Production of General Motors sport-utility vehicles ended on December 23 and the remaining medium-duty Isuzu assembly line ended operations on April 23, 2009.

The Parker Pen Company was founded in Janesville. At one time its factory was the largest writing instrument plant in the world. The company later purchased ManpowerGroup, but eventually sold the pen business to Gillette, which closed the factory in 2000. Northwestern Mutual was founded in Janesville in 1857 but moved to Milwaukee two years later.

The Janesville Mall redeveloped in the late 1990s, and in 1998 Pine Tree Plaza opened. In November 2006, a Walmart Supercenter and a Sam's Club opened after a period of controversy.

The site of the former Janesville Oasis, known for Bessie, a large fiberglass cow at its entrance, began redevelopment in 2007; the anchor tenant is a Super Menards. Bessie the cow was spared by popular demand.

=== Largest employers ===
As of 2015, the largest employers in the city were:

- Mercy Health System
- Janesville School District
- Rock County
- Blackhawk Technical College
- Data Dimensions Corporation
- Seneca Foods
- City of Janesville
- Prent Corporation
- Blain Supply/Blain's Farm & Fleet
- SSI Technologies
- JP Cullen & Sons
- Dean Clinic – Janesville East
- Lemans Corporation
- St Mary's Janesville Hospital
- Bliss Communications
- Chambers & Owen
- Simmons
- Hufcor
- Amtec Corporation
- Grainger

== Arts and culture ==
=== National Register of Historic Places ===
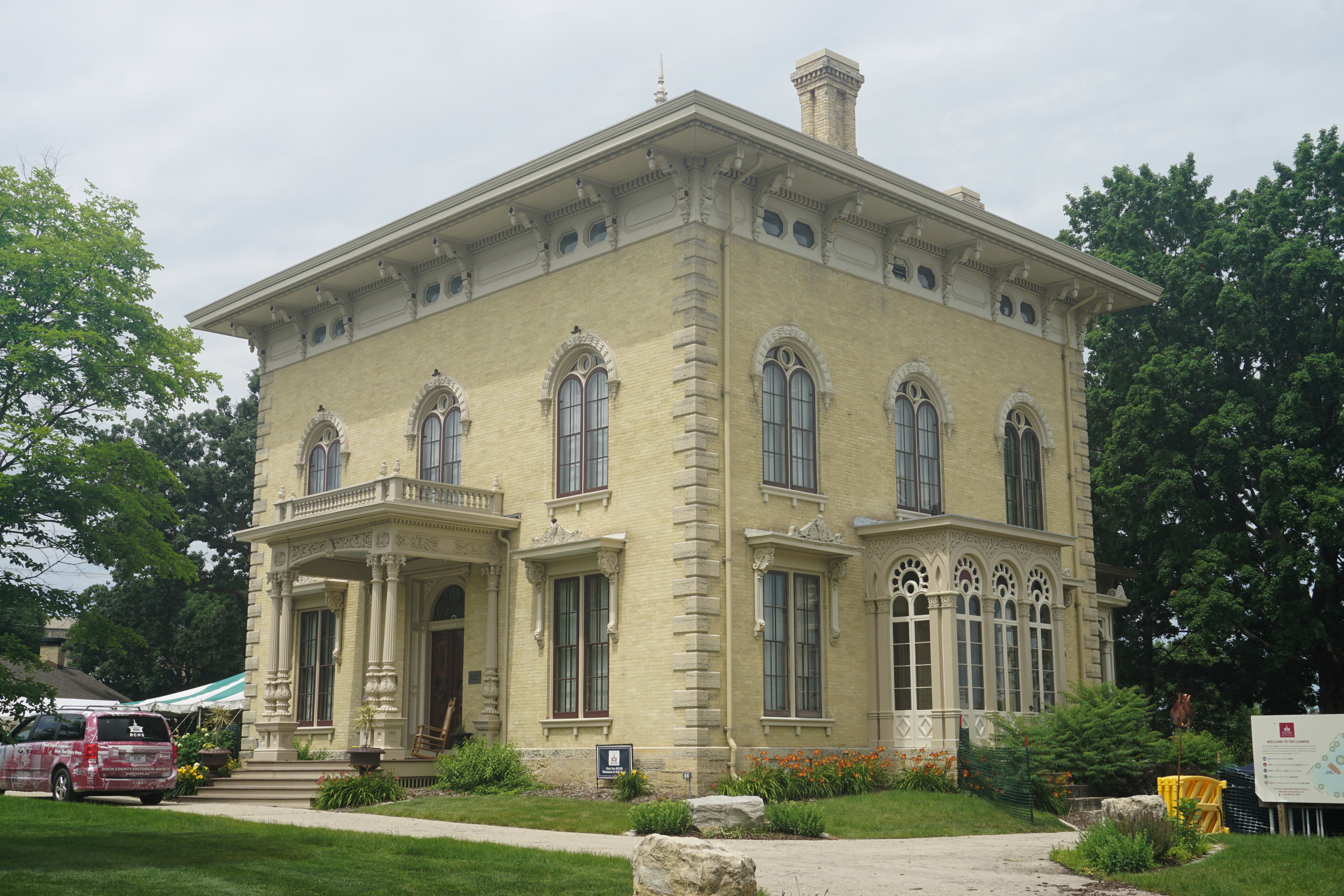
Lincoln-Tallman House, currently the Rock County Historical Society

The 1857 Lincoln-Tallman House, which models the Italian Villa-style architecture, is one of 34 sites on the Register. Abraham Lincoln slept there for two nights. The Columbus Circle neighborhood became Janesville's tenth historic district in 2005.

The old Janesville Public Library, located at 64 S. Main Street, was designed by J.T.W. Jennings, and opened to the public in 1903. It is described, in the NRHP Nominating Form, as "among the best Neoclassical Carnegie libraries in the state." The Courthouse Hill Historic District was added in 1986. In 1976, the Lappin-Hayes Block, once the site of the cabin belonging to Henry Janes, was added. The Lovejoy and Merrill-Nowlan Houses, the residences of two Janesville Mayors, including Allen P. Lovejoy, were added in 1980. During the following year, the Janesville Public Library building became part of the list. The Frances Willard Schoolhouse, partially built by Josiah Willard and named after his daughter, Frances, was added in 1977. The South Main Street Historic District joined the list in 1990 and the Jefferson Avenue Historic District was included in 2006. In 2008, the John H. Jones House was listed.

=== Hedberg Public Library ===
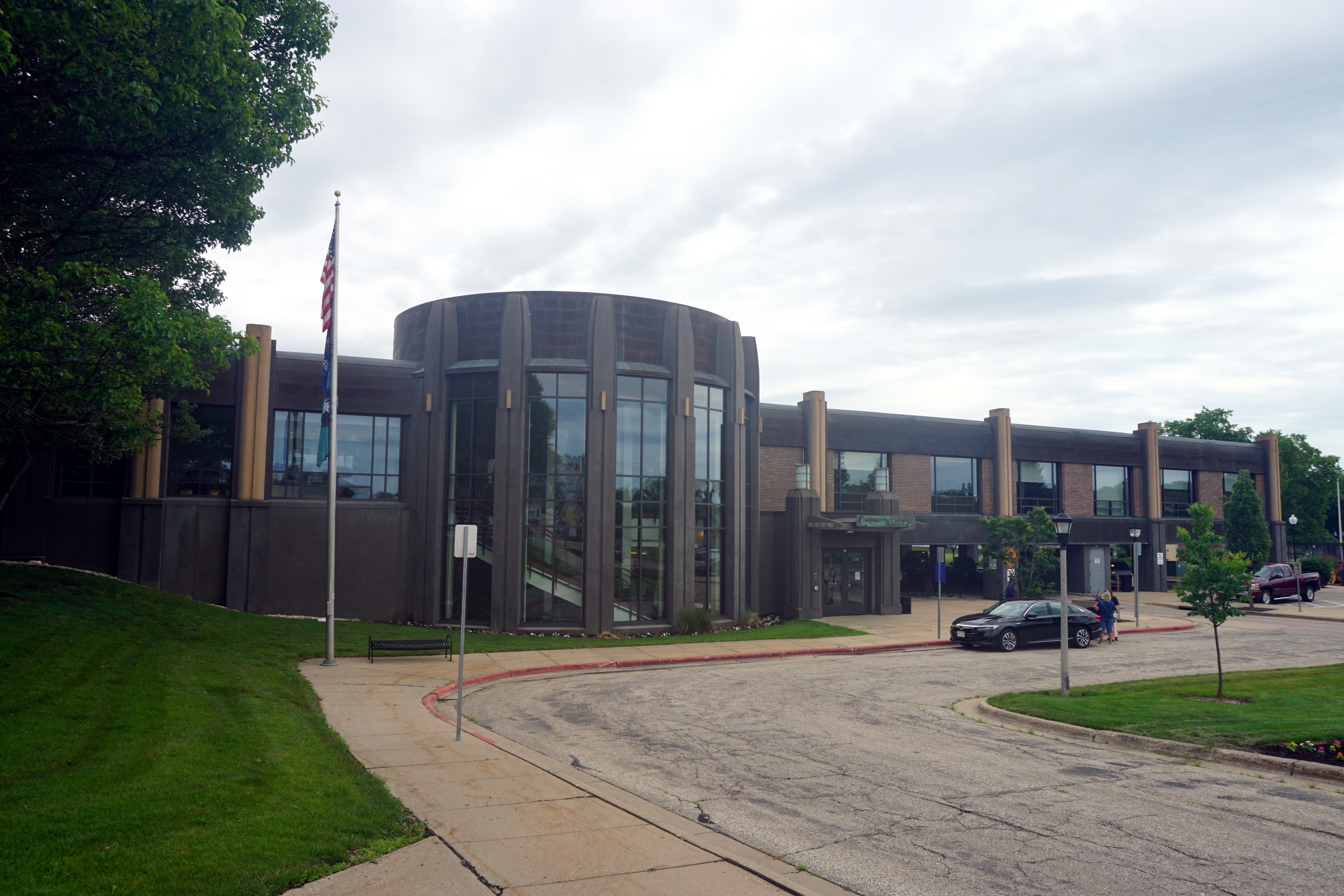
Hedberg Public Library

The library began in 1865 as a privately supported reading room for the Young Men's Library Association. It became a public library in 1884, and was housed in rented quarters. In 1903, a new building was constructed with $30,000 from Andrew Carnegie and other donors, and $3,000 from the city. In 1968, a new library was built. In 1996, it was renovated and renamed Hedberg Public Library. The library is part of the Arrowhead Library System.

== Sports ==
In fall 2009, Janesville became home to the Janesville Jets, an expansion team in the North American Hockey League, with games played at the Mercy Health Arena located in the Woodman's Center. Prior to 2025, the team played at the Janesville Ice Arena. The Janesville Cubs, a minor league baseball team affiliated with the Chicago Cubs, was based in Janesville from 1941 to 1942 and 1946 to 1953. They were called the Bears in 1946.

== Parks and recreation ==
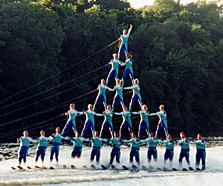
Rock Aqua Jays

Janesville is known as "Wisconsin's Park Place". Its 2,590-acre (10.5 km^{2}) park system includes 64 improved parks, as well as boat launches, golf courses, and nature trails. This is one of the highest acreages per capita in Wisconsin.

Janesville has a public, internationally themed botanical garden, Rotary Gardens, that was created from an abandoned sand pit.

Other major parks include Riverside Park, a recreational park along the Rock River including a golf course and a segment of the Ice Age Trail; Rockport Park, largely undeveloped, including the municipal swimming pool and Peace Park; Monterey Park, including the Big Rock, an early natural landmark signaling a good ford of the Rock River (and the namesake of the county, but not the river), as well as a sports stadium used by the school system; Lustig Park, used for a disc golf course; and Palmer Park, which includes a 9-hole golf course and CAMDEN Playground (an accessible play area, considered the largest accessible/integrated playground in the world and the most accessible/integrated playground). Most of the hiking and biking trails in the city are connected to the Ice Age Trail, which will eventually connect to the west with the Sugar River State Trail, north to Milton and Fort Atkinson and east to the Kettle Moraine State Forest.

Janesville also has a nearly 500-acre greenbelt system to provide areas for surface water runoff and habitat for a diversity of plants and animals.

== Government ==
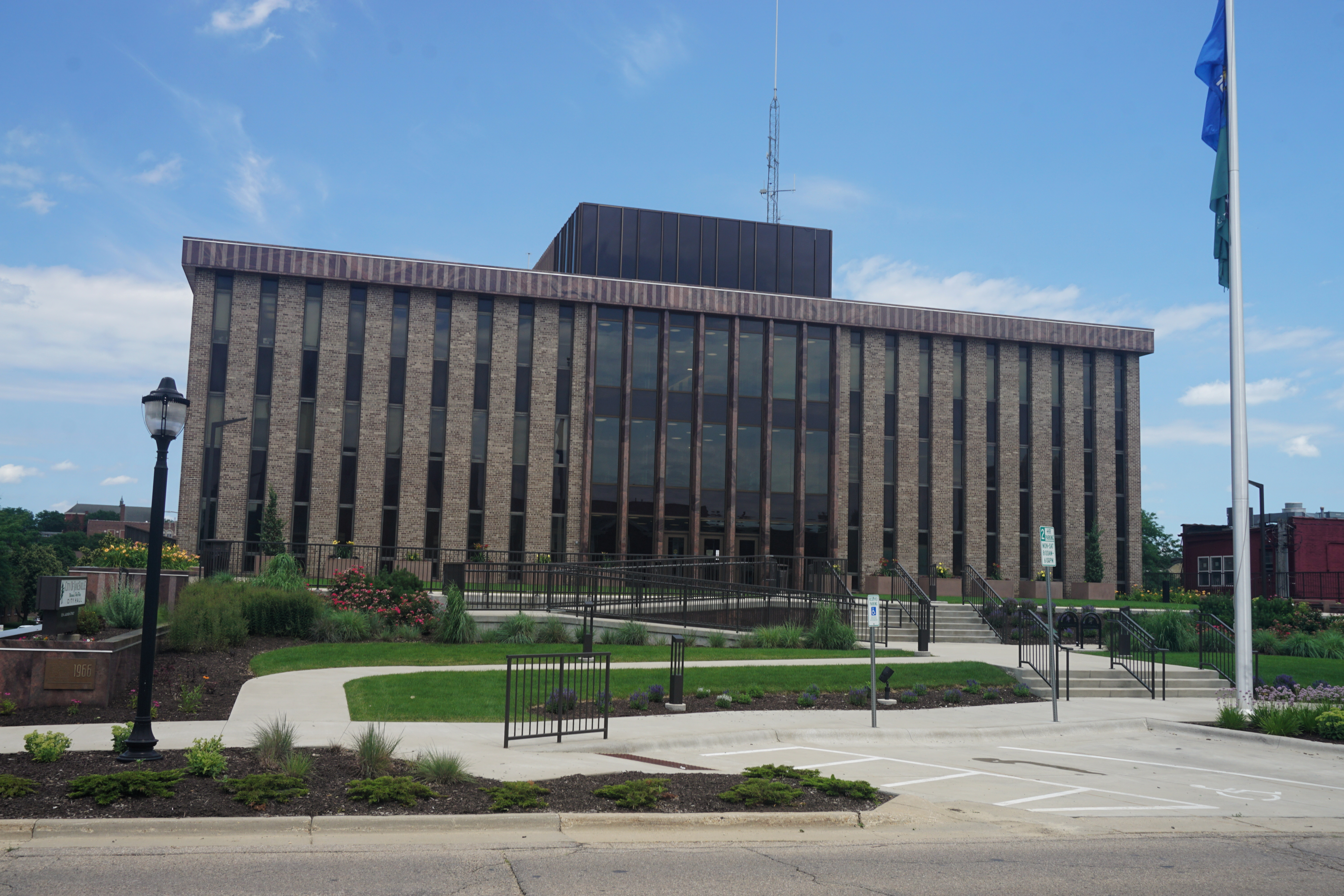
Janesville City Hall

Janesville has had a city manager-council form of government since 1923. The city council consists of seven members, elected at large for two-year terms. The current city council is composed of Paul Benson (president), David Marshick (vice president), Paul Williams, Aaron Burdick, Michael Jackson, Richard Neeno and Heather Miller.

Janesville is represented by Stephen Nass (R) and Janis Ringhand (D) in the Wisconsin State Senate, and Amy Loudenbeck (R) and Sue Conley (D) in the Wisconsin State Assembly. Bryan Steil (R) represents the city in the United States House of Representatives, and Ron Johnson (R) and Tammy Baldwin (D) in the United States Senate.

== Education ==
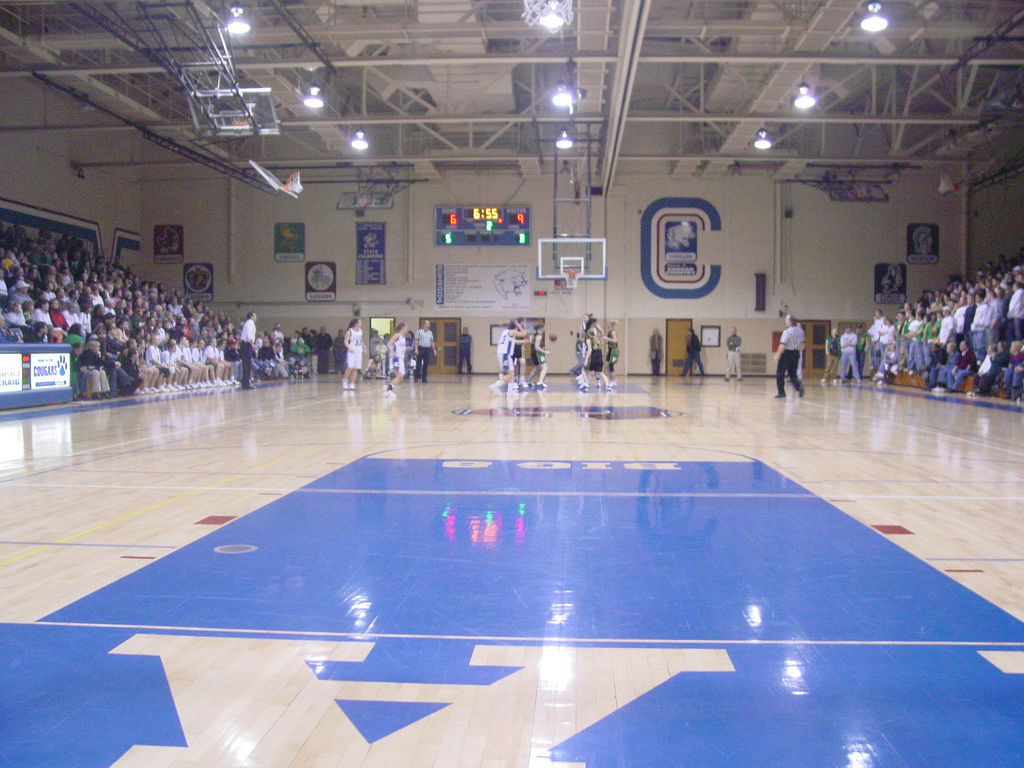
A basketball game between cross-town rivals, Joseph A. Craig High School and George S. Parker High School

The School District of Janesville has twelve elementary schools, three middle schools, two high schools, and five charter schools. In addition, there are seven parochial elementary and middle schools and one parochial high school.

The Wisconsin School for the Blind and Visually Impaired

has been located in Janesville since 1849 and state-run since 1850. A two-year community college, the University of Wisconsin–Rock County, located on the southwest side of Janesville, is part of the University of Wisconsin System. A two-year technical college, Blackhawk Technical College, is located midway between Janesville and Beloit; Blackhawk also offers degree programs through Upper Iowa University.

== Media ==
The Janesville Gazette, owned by Adams Publishing Group, is one of two daily newspapers in Rock County, Wisconsin, (the Beloit Daily News is the other), and serves a regional market stretching into Walworth County. Delavan-based Community Shoppers, Inc. publishes the bi-weekly Janesville Messenger.

Janesville has two television stations licensed to the city: Ion Television-affiliated WIFS (channel 57), which has its offices and transmitter in Madison and serves all of south-central Wisconsin, and W65EE (channel 65), a low-power translator station of the Trinity Broadcasting Network. Janesville is part of the Madison television market. Television stations from the Rockford market are also available on cable and over the air.

Janesville is home to three radio stations: news/talk WCLO (1230 AM), country WJVL (99.9 FM) and mainstream rock WWHG (105.9 FM), the latter of which is licensed to nearby Evansville and has studios in Janesville. All stations are owned by Big Radio. Variety WADR-LP (103.5 FM), a low-power station, also broadcasts to the city. Other radio stations serving the Janesville area include WFAW (940 AM), WBEL (1380 AM), WGEZ (1490 AM), WBKY (95.9 FM), WSLD (104.5 FM), and WSJY (107.3 FM). Janesville is also covered by radio stations from the Madison and Rockford markets.

== Transportation ==
=== Buses ===
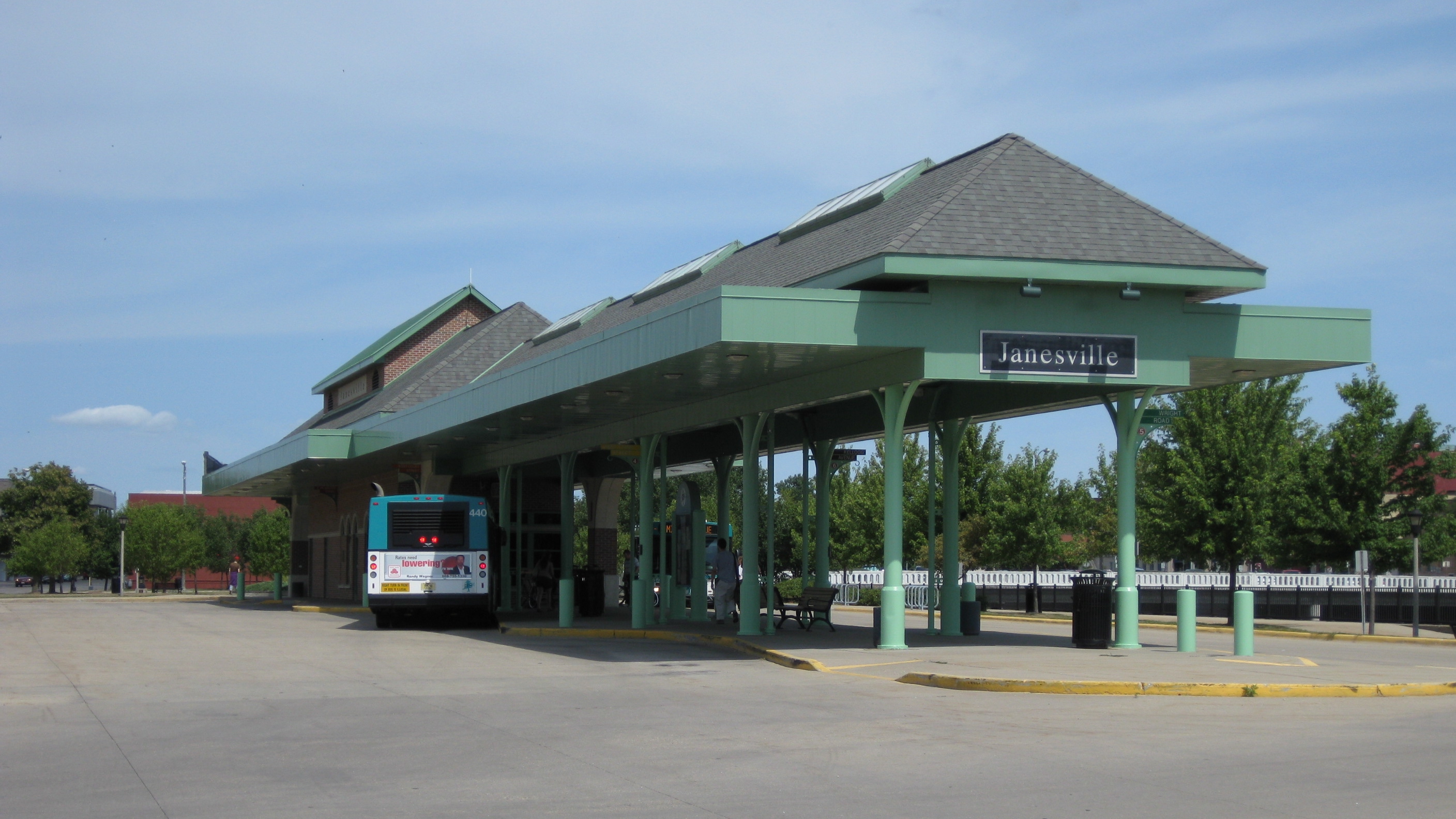
Janesville Bus Station

Janesville operates a bus system, the Janesville Transit System (JTS), which also connects with neighboring Beloit and Beloit Transit. Van Galder Bus Company (a Coach USA company), based in Janesville, operates a regional bus service between Madison and downtown Chicago and Chicago O'Hare Airport. Additional services to Minneapolis, Milwaukee and Wausau are operated by Megabus and Wisconsin Coach Lines.

=== Major highways ===
Interstate 90/39 passes through Janesville, as does U.S. Hwy 14 and 51 and state Hwy 26 and 11.

=== Air ===
Janesville is served by Southern Wisconsin Regional Airport (KJVL), which provides general aviation and air cargo services. The closest airports with commercial air service are Dane County Regional Airport in Madison and Chicago Rockford International Airport in Rockford, Illinois.

=== Rail ===
The city is served by three freight railroads: Union Pacific, which has two daily freight trains between Janesville and Chicago; the Wisconsin and Southern Railroad, a regional carrier that provides freight service to cities throughout southern Wisconsin; and the Iowa, Chicago and Eastern Railroad, a subsidiary of the Canadian Pacific Railway, that operates a weekly train to Chicago.

Janesville was previously served by Amtrak via the Lake Country Limited route in the early 2000s. The nearest passenger rail is available via the Metra Union Pacific Northwest Line at Harvard, IL 30 miles to the southeast with commuter rail service to Chicago's Ogilvie Transportation Center.
