= Woodman's Markets =

American supermarket chain

Woodman's Food Markets, Inc.

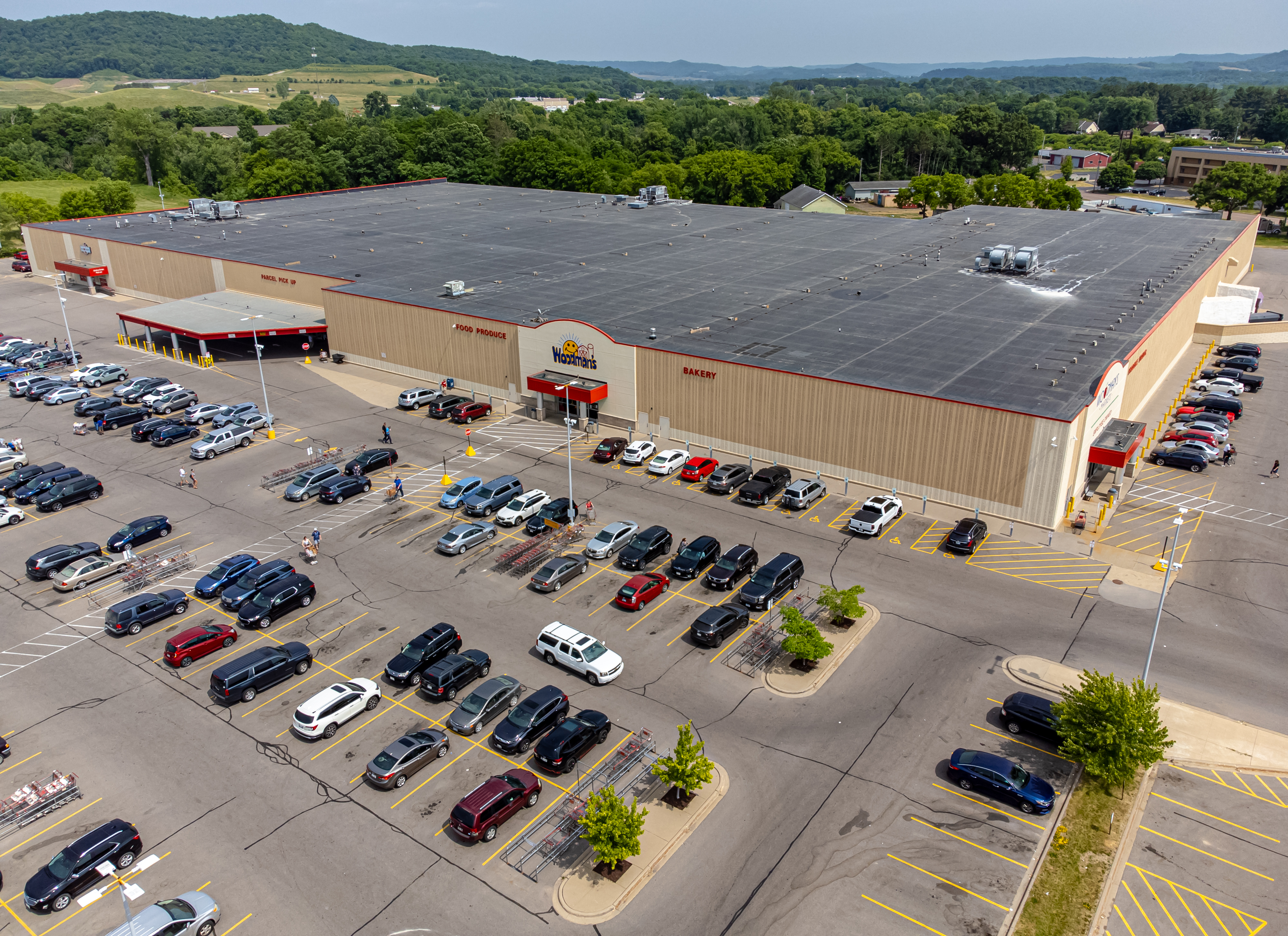
- Woodman's in Onalaska, Wisconsin
- Type: Private; employee-owned
- Industry: Retail
- Founded: 1919; 107 years ago in Janesville, Wisconsin, U.S.
- Founder: John Woodman
- Headquarters: Janesville, Wisconsin, U.S.
- Number of locations: 20 (2025)
- Area served: Wisconsin and Illinois
- Key people: Phil Woodman (President)
- Products: Bakery, delicatessen, dairy, grocery, frozen foods, organic foods, bulk foods, sushi, meat, produce, seafood, wine, beer, spirits, floral products, pet supplies, general merchandise, fuel
- Services: Supermarket; Convenience store; Gas station; Car wash; Online shopping
- Revenue: ▲$2 billion
- Number of employees: 3,800 (2021)
- Website: www.woodmans-food.com

Woodman's Markets or simply Woodman's is an employee-owned American regional supermarket chain based in Janesville, Wisconsin. Founded in 1919 as a produce stand, Woodman's has grown to operate twenty stores in Wisconsin and northern Illinois. Woodman's appeared on Supermarket News Top 50 Small Chains & Independents list since 2010. Most Woodman's locations are open 24 hours a day and have a gas station/convenience store close to the main building.

== History ==
Woodman's Markets was started in 1919 by John Woodman as a produce stand on the corner of Milton and Sherman Avenues in Janesville. John's son, Willard, later joined his father and in 1921 they built an indoor location on the original produce stand corner. The company continued to grow throughout the middle of the 20th century and in 1956 opened a second Janesville location. The original two stores eventually closed and were replaced by one larger store in 1973. Willard's son, Phil, joined him in managing the company in the 1960s, and remains president today. In 1971 Woodman's opened its first location outside Janesville, in neighboring Beloit. In 1975 Woodman's became the first Wisconsin-based grocery store to begin using UPC scanners.

Since the late 1970s, Woodman's has opened 20 stores throughout Wisconsin and Illinois. The Kenosha location, which opened in 1997, was the largest grocery store in the United States at the time. The 2001 opening of the Rockford, Illinois, store marked the first Woodman's store outside Wisconsin. Woodman's was privately owned by the Woodman family until 1998, when it became a 100 percent employee-owned company. In March 2008, Woodman's hit $1 billion in annual sales.

The company previously owned a stake in Roundy's, now a key regional competitor.

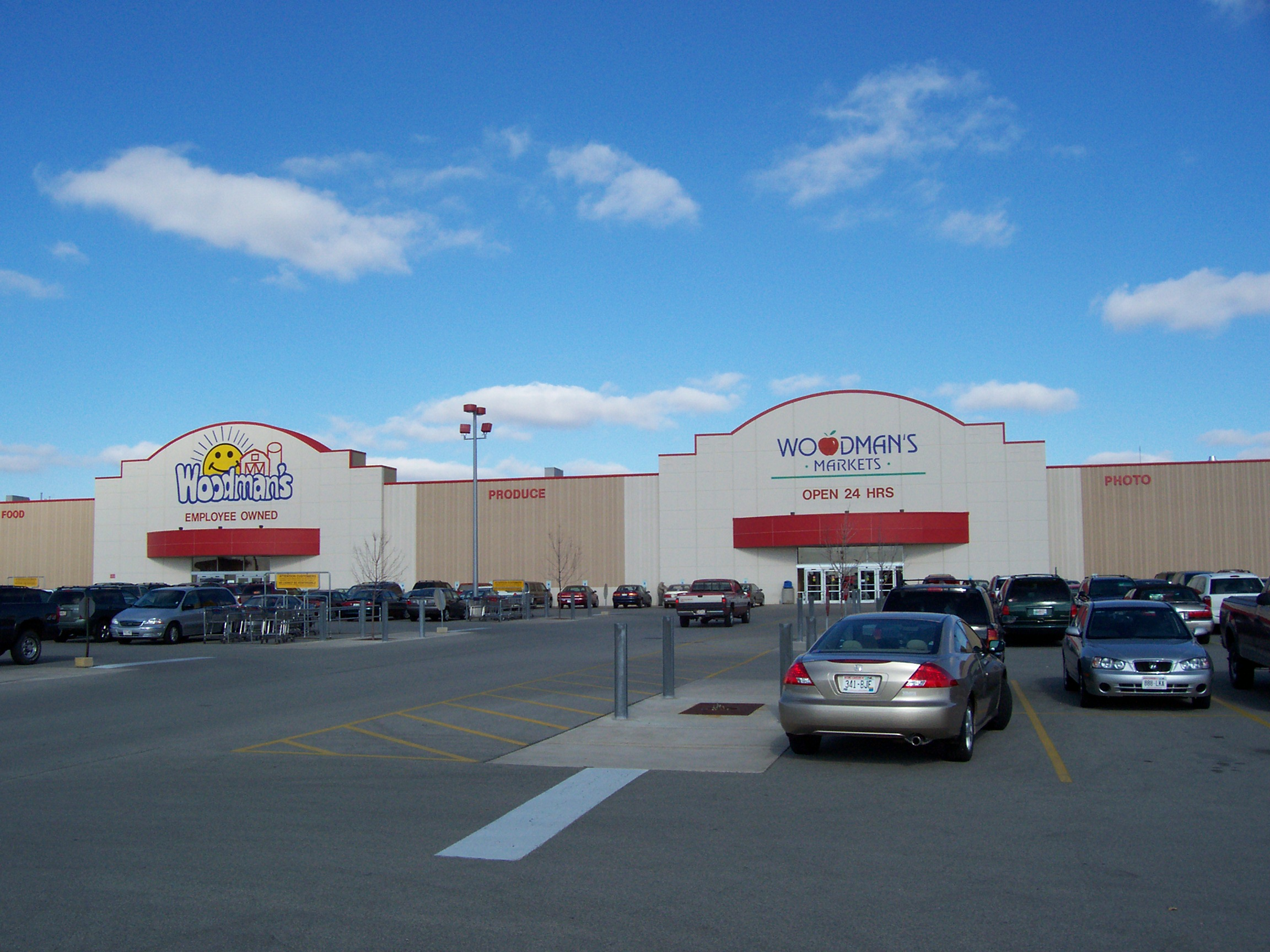
Appleton, Wisconsin location

== Store layout and sales model ==
Woodman's stores are based on a modified warehouse model, with stores in the 200–250,000-plus-square-foot range. Most new locations are built as an anchor store with several smaller outlets surrounding the store. The company prefers not to take on debt so it opens new stores only every two to three years, and remodels existing stores in between opening new stores.

Prices at Woodman's are lower than at many large grocery store chains because of their bulk purchasing model. Most items are stocked on the shelves by employees, but special bulk purchases and other items are sometimes shelved in their shipping cases or stacked in the aisles.

The store brands are those of the Elk Grove Village, Illinois–based private label co-op Topco Associates including, amongst others, Food Club, Full Circle Market, and That's Smart.

Woodman's allows payment by cash, check, Discover Card, PIN-based debit cards and EBT. Discover Card is the exclusive credit of Woodman's. Most Woodman's locations are open 24 hours and have 24-hour gas stations in close proximity to the main store. While the pumps themselves are 24 hours, each station has a convenience store that operates from 7:15 a.m. to 6:45 p.m. A car wash and fast multi-bay oil change operations are often attached to the convenience stores and operate with slightly reduced hours compared to the convenience stores. Shopping carts are varied, offering electric carts, oversized carts, carts that allow children to be strapped in, and carts for adults with special needs.

All Woodman's stores contain a large liquor store within the same building as the grocery store, but with a separate entrance, hours of operation, and check-lanes. Store policy mandates that shoppers pay for all food and non-alcoholic beverage items separately from any alcohol.

== Employee benefits ==
Despite the company being employee-owned, Phil Woodman created controversy in December 2009 by eliminating the company's mental health coverage, complaining that patients could rack up uncontrolled costs for the company.

== Locations ==
Woodman's has twenty locations:

=== Illinois ===
- Bloomingdale
- Buffalo Grove
- Carpentersville
- Lakemoor
- North Aurora
- Plainfield
- Rockford
- Carpentersville

=== Wisconsin ===
- Altoona
- Appleton
- Beloit
- Green Bay
- Janesville
- Kenosha
- Madison (East)
- Madison (West)
- Menomonee Falls
- Oak Creek
- Onalaska
- Racine
- Sun Prairie
- Waukesha
