= Mercyhealth =

Hospital system serving Wisconsin and Illinois

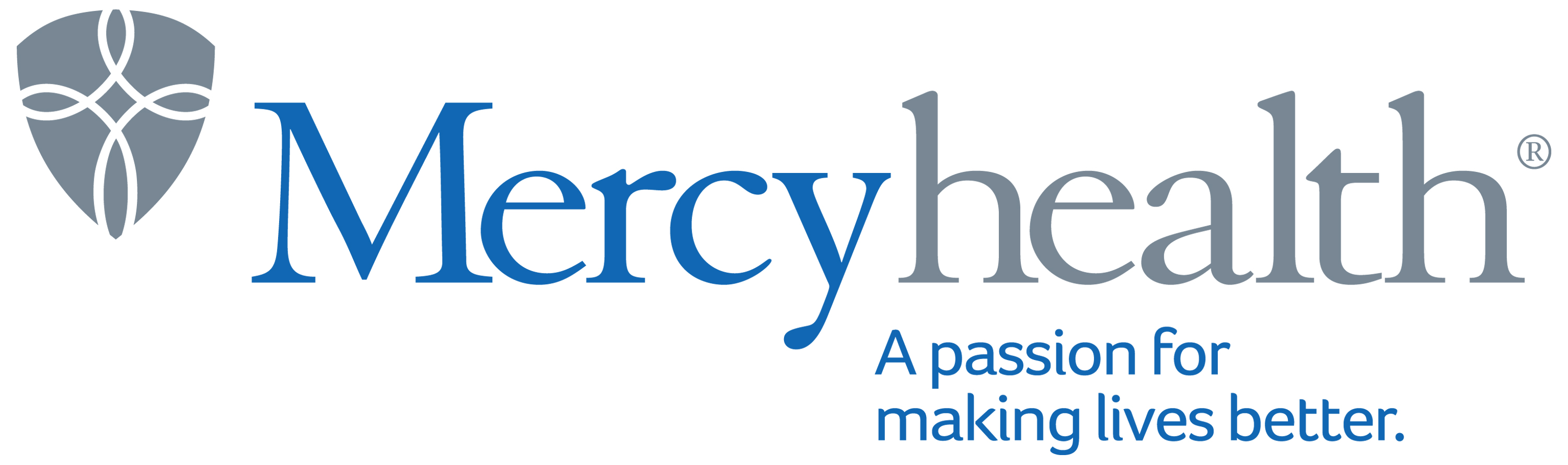
- Type: Non-profit organization
- Industry: Health care
- Founded: 1883 in Janesville, Wisconsin, United States
- Founder: Henry Palmer
- Headquarters: Rockford, IL
- Number of locations: 85
- Area served: Southern Wisconsin, Northern Illinois
- Key people: Javon R. Bea, CEO; Henry Palmer, Founder
- Revenue: $1.3 billion
- Number of employees: 6,750
- Website: www.mercyhealthsystem.org

Mercyhealth is a non-profit health care system based in Rockford, Illinois. It is a regional health care system with over 85 facilities serving a total of 55 communities throughout southern Wisconsin and northern Illinois. As part of its diversified, vertically integrated system, Mercyhealth operates over four core service areas: hospital-based services; clinic-based services; post-acute care and retail services; and a wholly owned and operated insurance company.

== History ==
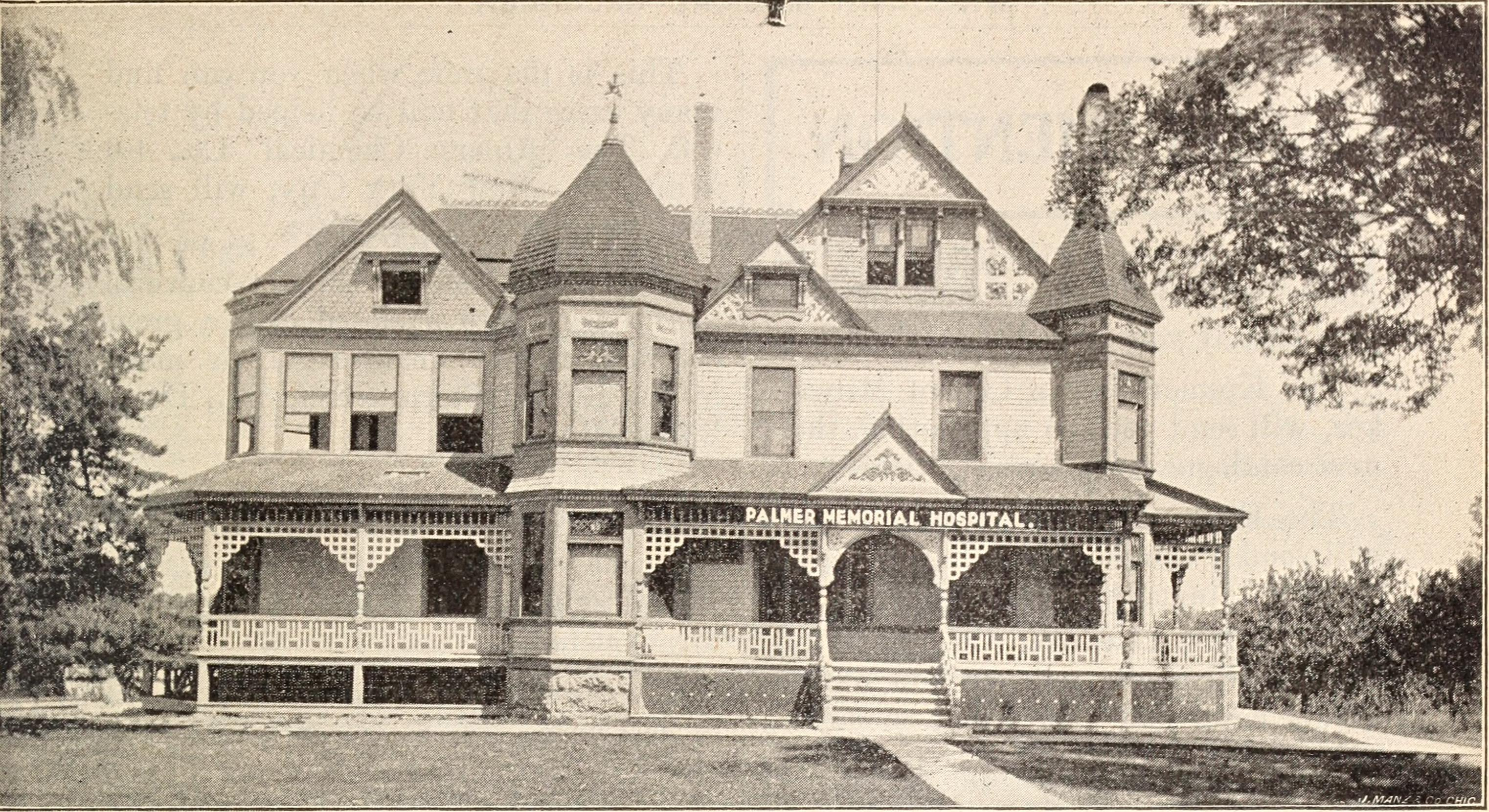
The Palmer Memorial Hospital in 1905

The original Janesville City Hospital was founded in 1883 by Dr. Henry Palmer, a Civil War surgeon general who had trained Daniel Hale Williams, an African American surgeon who, in 1893, was the first physician to successfully perform an open heart surgery. Dr. Williams spent two years as an apprentice to Dr. Henry Palmer. The hospital was later renamed Palmer Memorial Hospital and was operated by his son Dr. William Palmer. Soon after it was bought by the Sisters of Mercy of Chicago who renamed it Palmer Memorial Mercy Hospital. The Mercy Sisters worked as trained nurses during the Civil War, and after the war they took on the work of public health care. Need for expansion led to the Sisters of Mercy opening a 50-bed Mercy Hospital facility in Janesville in 1913, which eventually grew through renovation into a 150-bed facility by 1920.

In the second half of the 20th century the Sisters of Mercy began to divest itself of its health care holdings, including the Janesville hospital, and Mercy became an independent organization. At that same time, Mercyhealth grew out of their old hospital and built a 275-bed facility in downtown Janesville, WI. This facility is the current site of Mercyhealth Hospital and Trauma Center.

In 1989, Mercyhealth's volunteer board of directors selected Javon R. Bea as its president and CEO. When Bea became CEO, Mercyhealth could only claim $33 million in annual revenue, had only 589 total employees in a single hospital location, and only saw an estimated 89,000 patients yearly. As of 2020, Mercyhealth sees an average of 1.2 million patients every year, employs over 6,750 people across 85 locations, and can claim $1.3 billion in annual revenue.

Rockford Hospital opened in 1855 and was the city's first hospital. By 1913, the hospital outgrew its 11-patient capacity in a made-over home at South Court and Chestnut streets, and a 30-patient hospital was built, with the hospital's name being changed to Rockford Memorial Hospital in 1942. The Court-Chestnut location would serve the area until July 1954, when a new building was constructed on North Rockton Avenue.

On October 23, 2014, the boards of Rockford Health System and Mercy Health System agreed to a merger.

The merged system includes six hospitals, more than 515 physicians, 6,475 employees and 85 outpatient and specialty care clinics in Illinois and Wisconsin. In January 2019, they opened a $505 million hospital and physician clinic in Rockford called Mercyhealth's Javon Bea Hospital and Physician Clinic–Riverside. In addition, the hospital on the Mercyhealth Rockton Avenue campus (formerly Rockford Memorial) was renamed to Javon Bea Hospital.

== Recent events ==
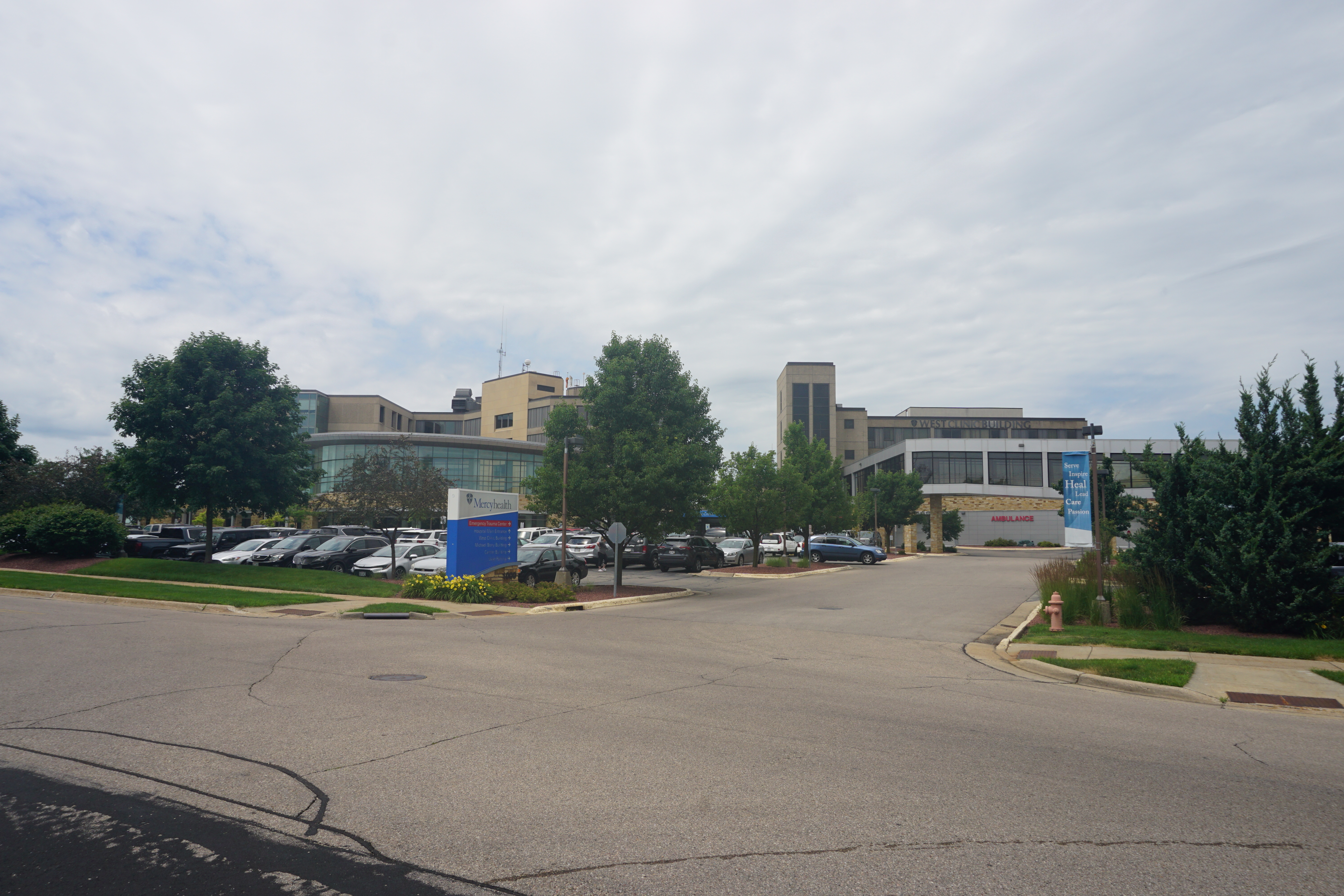
Mercyhealth Hospital and Trauma Center in Janesville, Wisconsin

On December 31, 2025, Mercyhealth acquired FHN.

In 2025, Mercyhealth opened a New Cancer Institute at Javon Bea Hospital–Riverside.

In 2025, Mercyhealth opened a new facility at 1400 Inman Parkway in Beloit, offering behavioral health services, occupational health and a pharmacy.

In 2024, Mercyhealth opened Mercyhealth Urgent Care–Dixon in Dixon, IL.

In 2023, Mercyhealth opened the Mercyhealth Hospital and Physician Clinic–Crystal Lake, a $105 million new facility.

In 2023, Mercyhealth opened a 12,000-square-foot Kidney Care and Dialysis Center in Janesville.

In 2022, Mercyhealth announced a partnership with Blackhawk Technical College in Janesville, WI to assist students going into health care by offering five full-ride scholarships.

In 2021, Mercyhealth Javon Bea Hospital–Rockton transitioned to a standby emergency department. The decision came after extensive evaluation of the needs and utilization of the Rockton Avenue campus. The review showed the majority of patients accessing the emergency department did not need emergency care and could be treated at an urgent care facility.

In June 2020, Mercyhealth announced the closure of the Pediatric Intensive Care Unit, which was only lightly used. The following month, the inpatient acute mental illness closed for similar reasons. Outpatient mental health services continue to be offered.

On April 22, 2020, Mercyhealth announced that the health system was terminating contracts with IlliniCare, Meridian, Molina, and Blue Cross Blue Shield Medicaid due financial difficulties from the COVID pandemic and a reduction in income from Medicaid and other health insurance providers.

On March 23, 2020, Mercyhealth announced unpaid furloughs to an undisclosed number of employees due to the COVID pandemic. Mercyhealth then reduced salaries for employees in leadership positions and physicians system-wide. This included the president and CEO, Javon Bea. In 2018, Javon Bea's salary was $9.36 million.

In 2019, Mercyhealth opened Javon Bea Hospital and Physician Clinic–Riverside, a $505 million new facility.

== Recognition ==
Mercyhealth has received awards for health care, work place culture, organizational leadership, community outreach and more including:

- The Mercyhealth Care Center was named among the “Best Nursing Homes” in the country by US News & World Report.
