= Lappin-Hayes Block =

- U.S. National Register of Historic Places
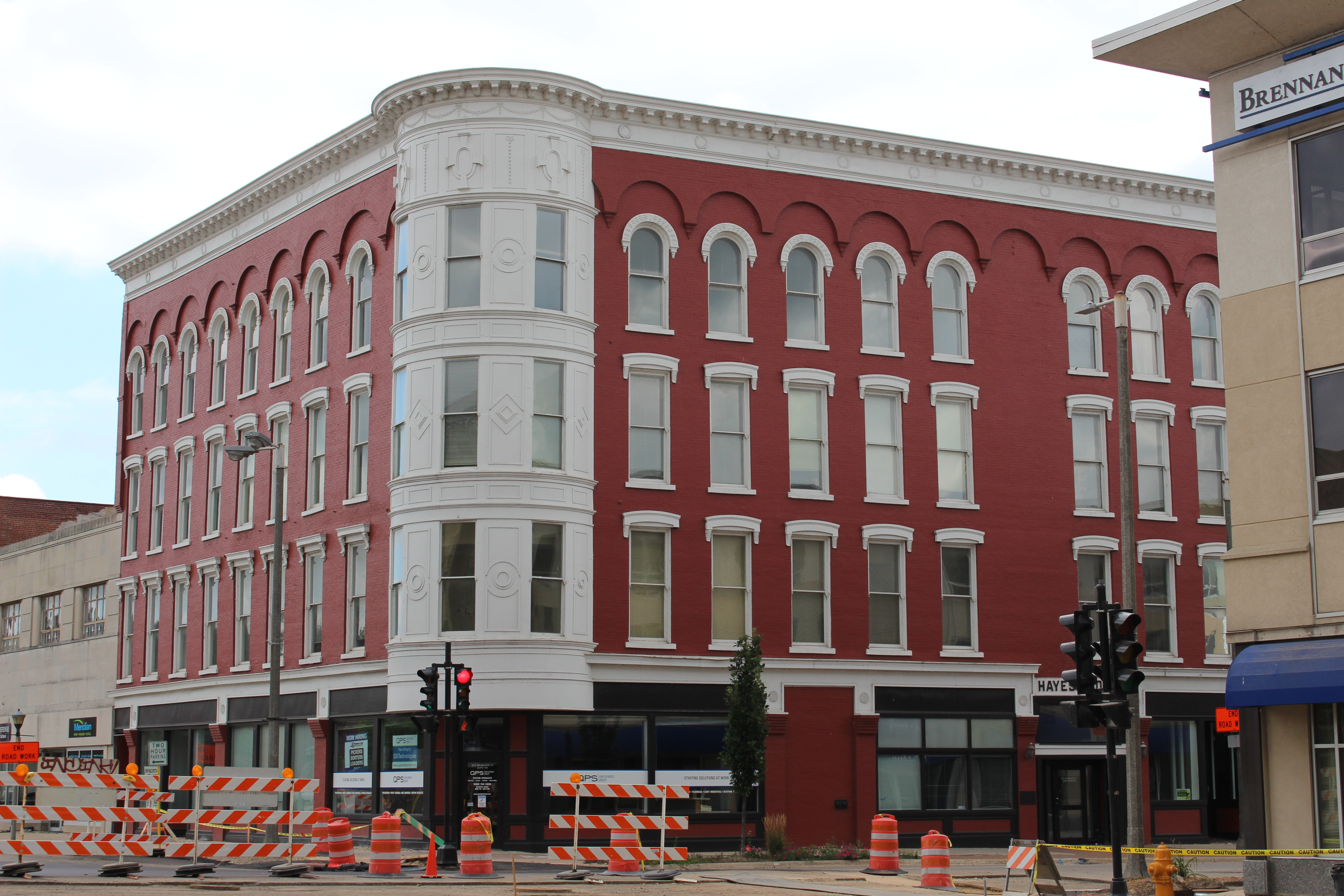
- Location: 20 E. Milwaukee St. Janesville, Wisconsin
- Coordinates: 42.68275°N 89.02269°W
- Built: 1855
- Architect: Peabody & Beauley
- Architectural style: Italianate
- NRHP reference No.: 76000224
- Added to NRHP: November 7, 1976

The Lappin-Hayes Block is a 4-story commercial building in Janesville, Wisconsin, started in 1855 and expanded in 1899. It housed a public hall called Lappin's Hall and the early offices of Northwestern Mutual Life. In 1976 it was added to the National Register of Historic Places.

== History ==
In 1836 Henry F. Janes, for whom Janesville was named, built a wooden house in the wilds where this block would end up - one of the first houses in Rock County. As the community grew, he ran a ferry across the Rock River, ran a tavern, and established the first post office in Rock County.

Thomas Lappin arrived in 1839, a few years later, and started the first store in Janesville, on Main Street. In 1842 he built a wooden 2-story store on the site of the current Lappin-Hayes Block. He prospered, and in 1855 replaced that store with a grand new $36,000 brick business block. The red brick upper stories and their windows are largely unchanged from 1855, but that original building had a different cornice and did not have the round towers on the corners. The hood moulds above the windows are a surviving element of the building's original Italianate style. Inside, Lappin's New Block housed at least five stores at street level. The second floor held offices: attorneys, at least one doctor, Lappin's own real estate office, and others. The third and fourth floors held an 800-seat auditorium called Lappin's Hall. Some part of those floors held an architect's office, a photographer, and an Odd Fellows Hall. The basement may have held a saloon.

Northwestern Mutual Life Insurance was one of the most important tenants, moving offices to the building in 1858. Lappin's Hall was the main public hall in the city until Myer's Opera House opened in 1870.

Thomas Lappin died in 1899. He had specified in his will that his other real estate holdings could be sold, but "in no event sell my four story Block unless my said Executors are unable to mortgage the same." Yet that same year the executors sold it to Dennis and Michael Hayes, Janesville contractors. They renovated the structure, engaging Arthur Peabody and William J. Beauley of Chicago to design updates to the building. The changes included the unusual round towers on the two corners, covered with sheet metal and decorated more in step with the Queen Anne style that was popular in the 1890s than the original Italianate. The original cornice (probably wood) was replaced with a projecting sheet metal cornice decorated with modillions. Hood moulds of windows which were replaced by the corner towers were moved to other locations, and fire escapes were added. Much of the interior was remodeled, aiming to produce Janesville's "first modern office building." An early elevator was installed and the central lightwell was created.

The building housed doctors, lawyers, insurance agents and others. The street-level facades were updated as stores moved out and in, so the originals are gone, but the upper exterior remains largely intact as it was after its 1899 update. Over the years the interior became more and more dated, and in 1974 the upper floors and elevator were closed.

The NRHP nomination considers the building significant for both its 1855 and 1899 architecture, for its association with Thomas Lappin and Arthur Peabody, for its association with Northwestern Mutual Life, and for the social importance of Lappin's Hall.
