= Solon Pierce =

American politician (1831–1903)

Solon W. Pierce

Member of the Wisconsin State Assembly from the Adams–Marquette district
- In office January 4, 1897 – January 2, 1899
- Preceded by: Sophronius S. Landt
- Succeeded by: Charles E. Kempley

Member of the Wisconsin State Assembly from the Adams district
- In office January 5, 1880 – January 1, 1883
- Preceded by: Charles A. Cady
- Succeeded by: Samuel Tanner (Adams–Marquette)
- In office January 1, 1877 – January 6, 1879
- Preceded by: G. M. Marshall (Adams–Wood)
- Succeeded by: Charles A. Cady
- In office January 3, 1870 – January 2, 1871
- Preceded by: Otis B. Lapham
- Succeeded by: Anson Rood

Personal details
- Born: March 7, 1831 Yorkshire, New York, U.S.
- Died: September 23, 1903 (aged 72) Adams County, Wisconsin, U.S.
- Resting place: Mount Repose Cemetery, Friendship, Wisconsin
- Party: Republican
- Spouses: Hester Ann Mosher (died 1865); Harriet E. Waterman (died 1900)

Military service
- Allegiance: United States
- Branch/service: United States Volunteers; Union Army
- Years of service: 1864–1865
- Rank: 1st Lieutenant, USV
- Unit: 38th Reg. Wis. Vol. Infantry
- Battles/wars: American Civil War: Siege of Petersburg

Solon Wesley Pierce (March 7, 1831 – September 23, 1903) was an American lawyer, newspaper publisher, and Republican politician. He served seven terms in the Wisconsin State Assembly between 1870 and 1897, representing Adams County. He also operated one of the first newspapers in Adams County, the Adams County Press.

== Biography ==
Pierce was born in Yorkshire in Cattaraugus County, New York, in 1831. He studied at the Mendon Academy in Monroe County, New York, and settled in Adams County, Wisconsin, in 1854. He was admitted to the bar in 1858 and started a law practice in the county seat—Friendship. He was first elected district attorney of Adams County in 1861, and the same year (with several associates) founded the Adams County Press, just a few weeks after the outbreak of the American Civil War. Pierce remained as editor and publisher of this newspaper (one of the first published in Adams County) for the majority of the next 40 years until his death in 1903.

In 1864 Pierce enlisted in the Union army, was commissioned a first lieutenant, and saw action (with the regiments that made up the 9th Army Corps, Army of the Potomac) at the Siege of Petersburg, among other battles toward the end of the Civil War. These experiences formed the basis of his 1866 book Battle Fields and Camp Fires of the 38th Regiment, published by the Daily Wisconsin Printing House of Milwaukee.

After his honorable discharge in 1865, Pierce resumed his law practice and newspaper duties, serving several years as county judge, and beginning in 1870 was elected as a legislator to the Wisconsin Assembly, being re-elected to the same body in 1877, 1878, 1880, 1881, 1882, and 1897. He served as chairman of the Assembly's judiciary committee in 1880, 1881, and 1882. As Adams County district attorney in 1892, he instituted the first successful gerrymander suit in the state of Wisconsin. He is also credited with being the author of an 1882 amendment to the Wisconsin state constitution which provided for biennial elections of legislators.

Pierce died at his home in Friendship.

== Published works ==
- Pierce, S. W. (1866). Battle Fields and Camp Fires of the Thirty-Eighth Wisconsin Volunteers. Milwaukee: Daily Wisconsin Printing House.

Wisconsin State Assembly
Preceded by Otis B. Lapham	Member of the Wisconsin State Assembly from the Adams district January 3, 1870 – January 2, 1871	Succeeded by Anson Rood
Preceded by G. M. Marshall (Adams–Wood)	Member of the Wisconsin State Assembly from the Adams district January 1, 1877 – January 6, 1879	Succeeded by Charles A. Cady
Preceded by Charles A. Cady	Member of the Wisconsin State Assembly from the Adams district January 5, 1880 – January 1, 1883	Succeeded by Samuel Tanner (Adams–Marquette)
Preceded by Sophronius S. Landt	Member of the Wisconsin State Assembly from the Adams–Marquette district January 4, 1897 – January 2, 1899	Succeeded by Charles E. Kempley
