= James Woodbury Perkins =

19th century American politician

James W. Perkins

Member of the Wisconsin State Assembly from the Adams–Marquette district
- In office January 5, 1885 – January 7, 1889
- Preceded by: Samuel Tanner
- Succeeded by: John W. Gunning

Personal details
- Born: September 16, 1840 Warner, New Hampshire, U.S.
- Died: August 18, 1892 (aged 51) Westfield, Wisconsin, U.S.
- Resting place: Newchester Cemetery, Grand Marsh, Wisconsin
- Party: Republican
- Spouses: Mary A. Atkins (m. 1866; died 1874); Martha M. Keller (m. 1874)
- Children: with Mary Atkins; James Frank Perkins^{(b. 1866; died 1947)}; Fred H. Perkins^{(b. 1868)}; Leon R. Perkins^{(b. 1870; died 1928)}; George Perkins^{(b. 1872)}; with Martha Keller; Bertie Perkins^{(died 1876)}; Claude B. Perkins^{(b. 1877)}; Charles E. Perkins^{(b. 1880; died 1880)}; Edith M. Perkins^{(b. 1880; died 1880)}; Olive F. (Bjornson)^{(b. 1891; died 1981)}

Military service
- Allegiance: United States
- Branch/service: United States Volunteers; Union Army
- Years of service: 1861–1865
- Rank: Sergeant, USV
- Unit: 11th Reg. Wis. Vol. Infantry
- Battles/wars: American Civil War

James Woodbury Perkins, Jr., (September 16, 1840 – August 18, 1892) was an American businessman and Republican politician. He was a member of the Wisconsin State Assembly, representing Adams and Marquette counties in the 1885 and 1887 sessions. As a young man, he served in the Union Army through the entire American Civil War.

== Biography ==
James W. Perkins, Jr., was born in Warner, New Hampshire, on September 16, 1840. He received an academic education and moved to Wisconsin in 1857, settling at New Chester, in Adams County.

At the outbreak of the American Civil War, Perkins volunteered for service in the Union Army. On September 6, 1861, he was enrolled as a private in Company H of the 11th Wisconsin Infantry Regiment. With the 11th Wisconsin Infantry, he participated in the fighting in the western theater of the war, and was involved in several of the important battles of the Vicksburg campaign. He was promoted to corporal, and later to sergeant. At the expiration of his three year enlistment in 1864, he re-enlisted as a veteran and continued with his regiment until the end of the war. He mustered out with his regiment on September 4, 1865.

After returning from the war, he worked as a dealer of agricultural equipment. He became involved in local politics and served as justice of the peace, town clerk, postmaster, and town chairman. He also served four years as chairman of the board of supervisors of Adams County.

He was elected to the Wisconsin State Assembly in 1884, running on the Republican Party ticket and defeating Democratic incumbent Samuel Tanner. He was re-elected in 1886, but did not run for a third term in 1888 and left office in January 1889. During the 1887 session, he served as chairman of the committee on charitable and penal institutions.

He relocated to Westfield, Wisconsin, in neighboring Marquette County, after his term in the Assembly. He died at his home in Westfield on August 18, 1892.

== Personal life and family ==
James Perkins' father, James Woodbury Perkins, Sr., was a physician and Christian minister. The Perkins family were direct descendants of John Perkins, a British colonist from Gloucestershire who settled in the Massachusetts Bay Colony in 1631.

James Perkins, Jr., married twice. His first wife was Mary A. Atkins of Milton, Wisconsin. They married on January 1, 1866, and had at least four children before her death in 1874. Perkins then married Martha M. Keller of Philadelphia on November 8, 1874, and had at least three more children, though two of those (twins) died in infancy.

== Electoral history ==
=== Wisconsin Assembly (1884, 1886) ===
Wisconsin Assembly, Adams–Marquette District Election, 1884
Party	Candidate	Votes	%	±%
General Election, November 8, 1884
Republican	James W. Perkins	2,949	59.00%	+19.71%
Democratic	Samuel Tanner (incumbent)	2,049	41.00%	
Plurality		900	18.01%	-3.41%
Total votes		4,998	100.0%	+80.82%
Republican gain from Democratic				

Wisconsin Assembly, Adams–Marquette District Election, 1886
Party	Candidate	Votes	%	±%
General Election, November 2, 1886
Republican	James W. Perkins (incumbent)	2,096	62.40%	+3.40%
Democratic	Hugh Donnelly	1,263	37.60%	
Plurality		833	24.80%	+6.79%
Total votes		4,998	100.0%	-32.79%
Republican hold				

Wisconsin State Assembly
Preceded by Samuel Tanner	Member of the Wisconsin State Assembly from the Adams–Marquette district January 5, 1885 – January 7, 1889	Succeeded by John W. Gunning
