= Anson Rood =

19th century American politician

Member of the Wisconsin State Assembly from the Adams district
- In office January 2, 1871 – January 1, 1872
- Preceded by: Solon Pierce
- Succeeded by: George Allen Neeves (Adams–Wood)
- In office January 4, 1864 – March 16, 1864
- Preceded by: Otis B. Lapham
- Succeeded by: Revel K. Fay

Member of the Wisconsin State Assembly from the Marathon–Portage–Wood district
- In office January 5, 1857 – January 4, 1858
- Preceded by: Joseph Wood (Marathon–Portage)
- Succeeded by: Burton Millard

Personal details
- Born: September 23, 1827 Vermont, U.S.
- Died: January 17, 1898 (aged 70) Randolph, Iowa, U.S.
- Resting place: Randolph Cemetery, Randolph, Iowa
- Party: Republican; Natl. Union (1863–1867)
- Spouse: Clarissa Allen Sylvester (died 1901)
- Children: Edwin Sylvester Rood^{(b. 1852; died 1917)}; Albert Rood^{(b. 1855; died 1892)}; Clara Ellen Rood^{(b. 1858; died 1859)}; William O. Rood^{(b. 1865; died 1942)}; Cora Abigal Rood^{(b. 1866; died 1937)}

Military service
- Allegiance: United States
- Branch/service: United States Volunteers; Union Army
- Years of service: 1864–1865
- Rank: Captain, USV
- Unit: 38th Reg. Wis. Vol. Infantry
- Battles/wars: American Civil War

Anson Rood (September 23, 1827 – January 17, 1898) was an American businessman, farmer, Republican politician, and Wisconsin pioneer. He served three non-consecutive terms in the Wisconsin State Assembly between 1857 and 1872.

== Biography ==
Born in Jericho, Vermont, Rood moved with his parents to Chicago, Illinois, in 1837, and then to Joliet, Illinois. In 1841, Rood moved to Wisconsin Territory. He served in the 38th Wisconsin Infantry Regiment during the American Civil War and was a quartermaster. Rood served on the Stevens Point, Wisconsin, Common Council and was president of the council from 1850 to 1860. Rood served in the Wisconsin State Assembly in 1857, 1864, and 1871. Sometime after 1871, Rood moved to Randolph, Iowa, to a farm and was President of the Nebraska City, Sidney and North Eastern Railroad. He died in Randolph, Iowa.

Wisconsin State Assembly
Preceded by Joseph Wood (Marathon–Portage)	Member of the Wisconsin State Assembly from the Marathon–Portage–Wood district January 5, 1857 – January 4, 1858	Succeeded by Burton Millard
Preceded by Otis B. Lapham	Member of the Wisconsin State Assembly from the Adams district January 4, 1864 – March 16, 1864	Succeeded by Revel K. Fay
Preceded by Solon Pierce	Member of the Wisconsin State Assembly from the Adams district January 2, 1871 – January 1, 1872	Succeeded by George Allen Neeves (Adams–Wood)
