= Bintliff =

Bintliff is a surname. Notable people with the surname include:

- Barbara A. Bintliff, American lawyer
- James Bintliff (1824–1901), American Civil War colonel
