= Oak Hill Cemetery (Janesville, Wisconsin) =

Cemetery in Janesville, Wisconsin

- Interactive map of Oak Hill Cemetery

Details
- Established: 1851
- Location: 1725 N Washington St, Janesville, Wisconsin
- Country: US
- Coordinates: 42.703429°N 89.045515°W
- Size: 85 acres (34 ha)
- No. of interments: >24,000
- Find a Grave: Oak Hill Cemetery

Oak Hill Cemetery is an 85-acre burial site located in the city of Janesville, Wisconsin. The cemetery was established in 1851 by the Oak Hill Cemetery Association, which was organized under an act of the Legislature to create and maintain a cemetery in Janesville; it is now the final resting place for over 24,000 people, including many of the most prominent citizens from the history of Janesville. The land sits adjacent to Mount Olivet Cemetery, Janesville's historic Catholic cemetery.

== History ==
The Oak Hill Cemetery Association was founded on January 8, 1851. The cemetery association was formed under an act of the Wisconsin Legislature that enabled such associations to purchase land to establish cemeteries, and would exempt that land from taxation and other obligations. The association originally purchased 20 acres, but gradually expanded, comprising 56 acres by the 1870s, and eventually growing to 85 acres. The first interments at Oak Hill Cemetery were actually re-interred remains from the old pioneer cemetery—that old cemetery land was at the time repurposed for the construction of a high school.

== Notable interments ==
- Josiah D. Arnold (1820–1903) Wisconsin state legislator, 16th mayor of Portage, Wisconsin
- Leslie Allen Bellrichard (1941–1967) U.S. Army Medal of Honor recipient
- James Bintliff (1824–1901) Union Army general, co-founder of Northwestern Mutual
- Stephen Bolles (1866–1941) U.S. representative
- William B. Britton (1829–1910) Wisconsin state legislator, Union Army colonel
- Delia Collins (1830–1896) American educator, philanthropist, temperance advocate
- Harmon S. Conger (1816–1882) U.S. representative and Wisconsin circuit judge
- William H. Ebbets (1825–1890) Wisconsin state legislator
- Franklin S. Lawrence (1824–1897) Wisconsin state legislator
- William A. Lawrence (1822–1890) 6th mayor of Janesville, Wisconsin state senator
- Allen P. Lovejoy (1825–1904) 22nd mayor of Janesvile, Wisconsin state senator
- Hiram Merrill (1829–1908) 18th mayor of Janesville, Wisconsin state legislator
- Marion Juliet Mitchell (1836–1917) American poet
- David Noggle (1809–1878) chief justice of the Idaho Territory Supreme Court, Wisconsin circuit judge, Wisconsin state legislator
- Pliny Norcross (1838–1915) 20th mayor of Janesville, Wisconsin state legislator, Union Army captain
- Otis Norton (1809–1889) Wisconsin state senator
- Henry Palmer (1827–1895) 12th mayor of Janesville, surgeon general of Wisconsin
- George Morton Randall (1841–1918) U.S. Army general
- William B. Sheldon (1805–1847) Wisconsin Territory legislator, Janesville pioneer
- Ithamar Sloan (1822–1898) U.S. representative
- A. Hyatt Smith (1814–1892) 1st & 5th mayor of Janesville, 5th attorney general of the Wisconsin Territory
- Erastus C. Smith (1810–1891) Wisconsin state legislator and mill owner.
- James Sutherland (1820–1905) 17th mayor of Janesville, Wisconsin state senator
- Charles L. Valentine (1846–1925) 37th mayor of Janesville, Wisconsin state legislator
- John Holden Warren (1825–1901) Wisconsin state senator
- William G. Wheeler (1861–1936) Wisconsin state legislator, U.S. attorney
- John Meek Whitehead (1852–1924) Wisconsin state senator
- Edward V. Whiton (1805–1859) 1st elected chief justice (3rd overall) of the Wisconsin Supreme Court
- Charles G. Williams (1829–1892) U.S. representative
- John Winans (1831–1907) U.S. representative, 25th mayor of Janesville
