= List of city managers of Janesville, Wisconsin =

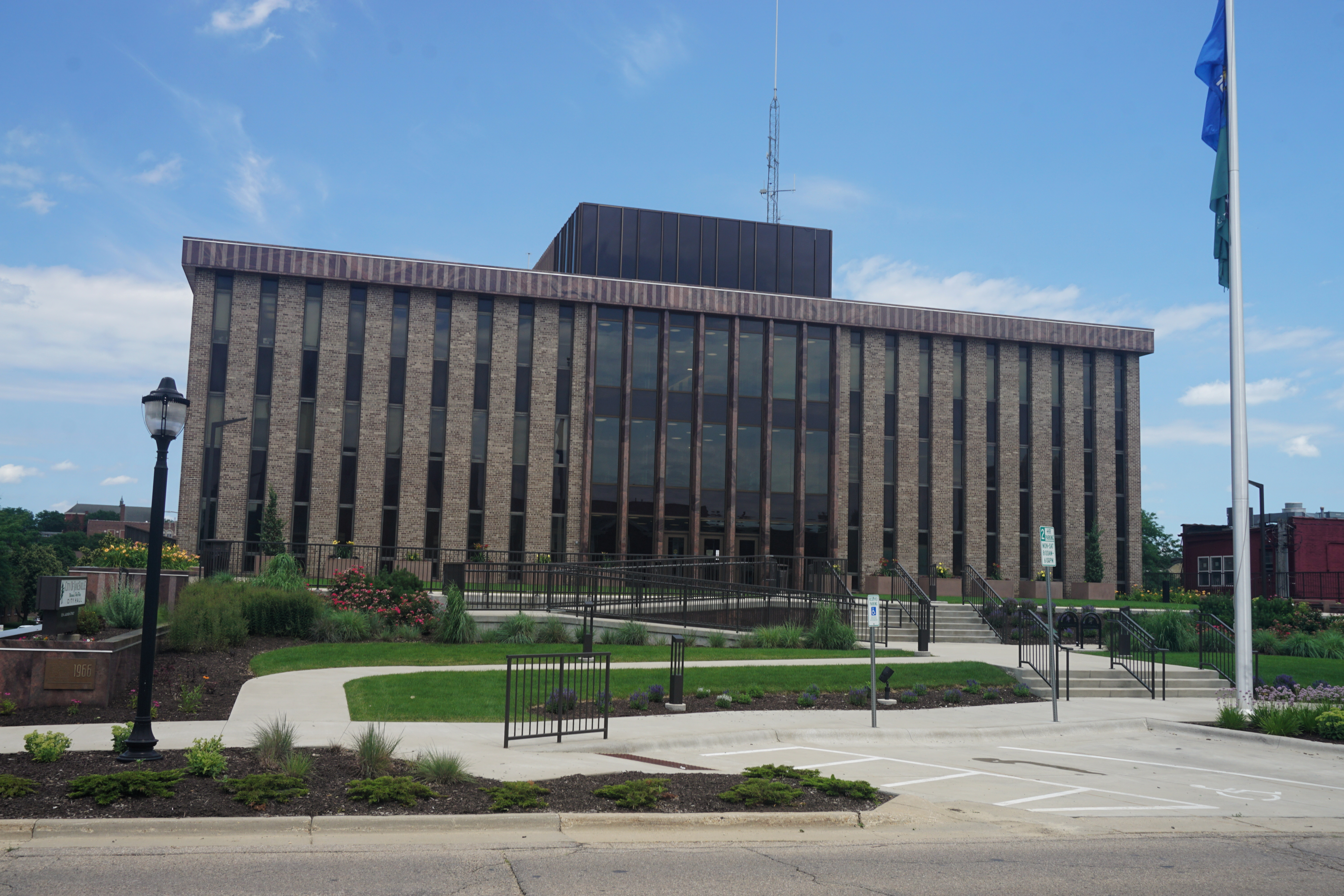
Janesville City Hall

This is a list of city managers and mayors of Janesville, Wisconsin, United States. Janesville was incorporated as a city in 1853, with a mayor-council form of government. In 1923, Janesville adopted the council-manager form of government, and has retained that form of government ever since.

The first mayor of Janesville was A. Hyatt Smith, a pioneer lawyer who was Wisconsin's second U.S. attorney. The first city manager was Henry Traxler, a civil engineer who had previously served as the city manager of Clarinda, Iowa. Traxler was also the longest-serving city manager, serving nearly 28 years. Kevin Lahner has been the city manager since 2023.

== Mayors (1853–1923) ==
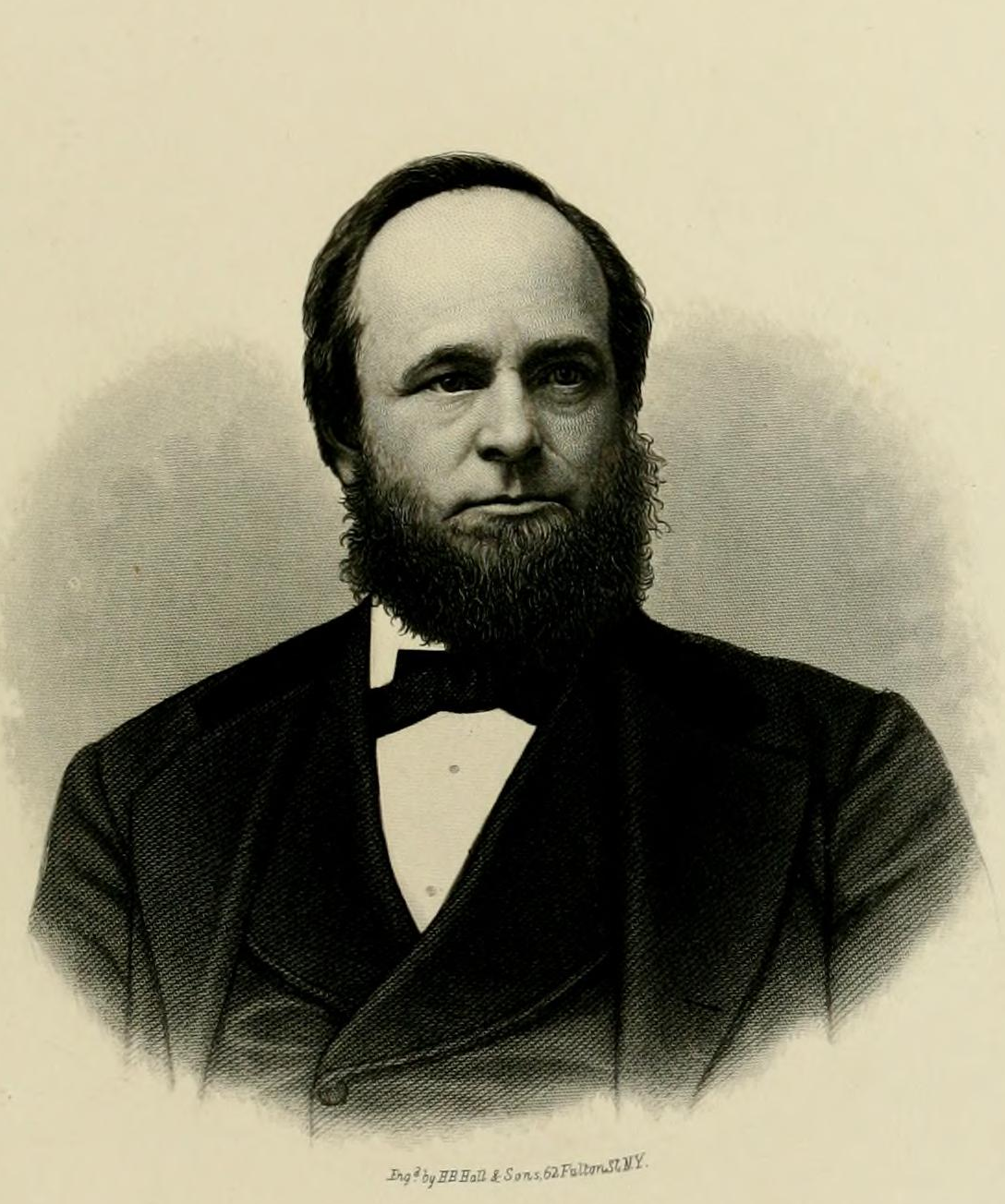
Dr. Henry Palmer, 12th mayor of Janesville and later surgeon general of Wisconsin.

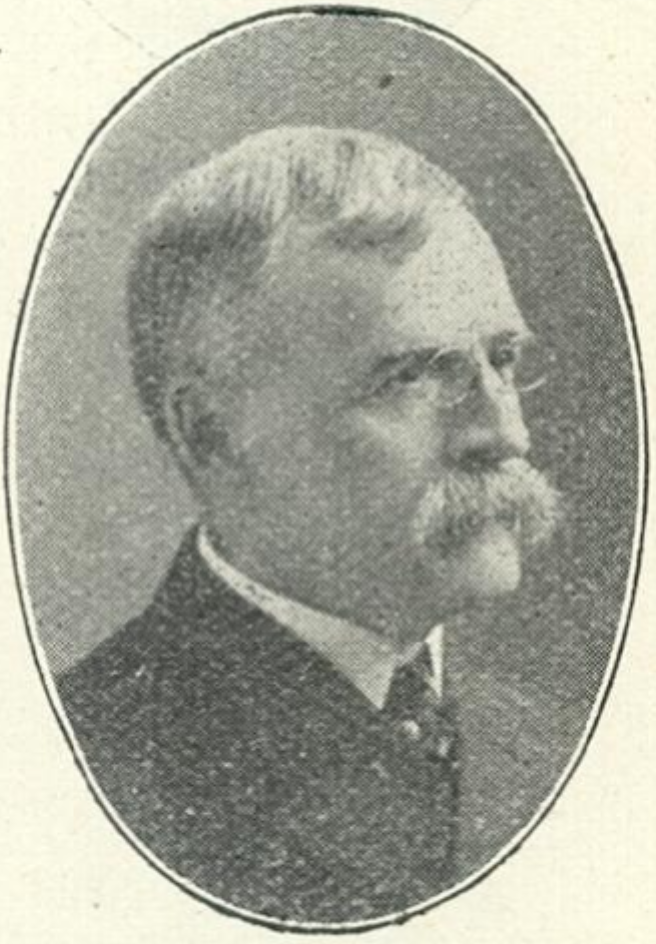
Pliny Norcross, 20th mayor of Janesville.

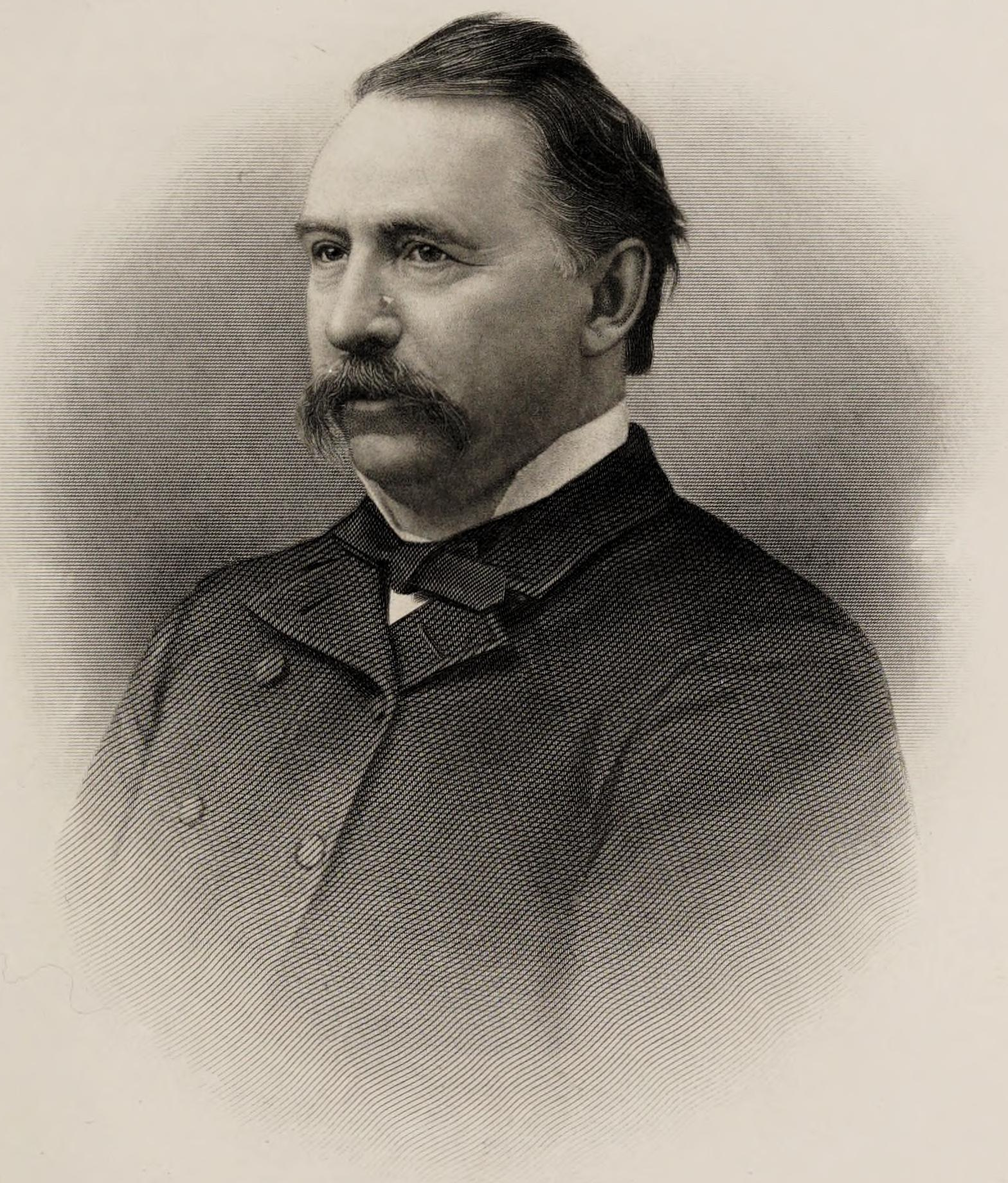
John Winans, 25th mayor of Janesville, earlier a U.S. representative.

Order	Mayor	Term start	Term end	Notes
1	A. Hyatt Smith	1853	1854	
2	J. Bodwell Doe	1854	1855	
3	Edward L. Dimock	1855	1856	
4	John J. R. Pease	1856	1857	
5	A. Hyatt Smith	1857	1858	First mayor to serve two terms.
6	William A. Lawrence	1858	1859	
7	Sanford Amos Hudson	1859	1860	
8	Robert Byron Treat	1860	1861	
9	J. Bodwell Doe	1861	1863	First mayor to serve three terms.
10	Robert Byron Treat	1863	1864	
11	John Mitchell	1864	1866	
12	Henry Palmer	1866	1868	
13	Alfred Augustus Jackson	1868	1869	
14	R. A. Loveland	1869	1870	
15	J. Bodwell Doe	1870	1871	First mayor to serve four terms.
16	Anson Rogers	1871	1872	
17	James Sutherland	1872	1874	
18	Hiram Merrill	1874	1875	
19	James W. St. John	1875	1877	
20	Pliny Norcross	1877	1879	
21	Samuel C. Cobb	1879	1881	
22	Allen P. Lovejoy	1881	1883	
23	James W. St. John	1883	1884	
24	Alexander Richardson	1884	1885	
25	John Winans	1885	1889	Resigned May 1887 then withdrew resignation.
26	James W. St. John	1889	1892	
27	Oscar D. Rowe	1892	1893	
28	John Thoroughgood	1893	1895	
29	Frank S. Baines	1895	1897	
30	John Thoroughgood	1897	1899	
31	Victor Pease Richardson	1899	1903	
32	Agesilaus Wilson	1903	1904	Died April 28, 1904.
33	James F. Hutchinson	1904	1907	Won May 1904 special election.
34	Stewart B. Heddles	1907	1909	
35	Wilbur F. Carle	1909	1911	
36	John C. Nichols	1911	1912	
37	James A. Fathers	1912	1918	First mayor to serve six terms.
38	Charles L. Valentine	1918	1919	
39	Thomas E. Welsh	1919	1923	Last mayor.

== City managers (1923–present) ==
Janesville voted in a 1922 city referendum to change their form of government to adopt the council-manager form of government, abolishing the office of mayor.

Order	Manager	Term start	Term end	Notes
1	Henry Traxler	1923	1951	Selected by city council August 1923. Resigned May 1, 1951. Longest-serving city manager.
-	Joseph Lustig	1951	1951	Interim manager.
2	Warren C. Hyde	1951	1955	Selected by city council July 1951. Resigned May 1, 1955.
-	Joseph Lustig	1955	1955	Interim manager.
3	George J. Forster	1955	1957	Selected by city council August 1955. Resigned January 1, 1957.
4	Joseph Lustig	1957	1967	Interim manager until selected by city council April 1957. Retired March 1, 1967.
5	Karl A. Samek	1967	1970	Interim manager until selected by city council September 1967. Asked to be replaced then continued as assistant city manager after 1970.
6	Robert O. Bailey	1970	1975	Selected by city council December 1970. Resigned October 1975.
-	Karl A. Samek	1975	1976	Interim manager.
7	Philip Deaton	1976	1986	Selected by city council January 1976. Resigned October 1986.
-	Jerold P. Franke	1986	1987	Interim manager.
8	Steven E.Sheiffer	1987	2008	Selected by city council March 1987. Resigned September 2008.
-	Jacob J. Winzenz	2008	2008	Interim manager.
9	Eric Levitt	2008	2013	Selected by city council October 2008. Resigned May 2013.
-	Jacob J. Winzenz	2013	2013	Interim manager.
10	Mark Freitag	2013	2022	Selected by city council December 2013.
-	David J. Moore	2022	2023	Interim manager.
11	Kevin Lahner	2023	present	Selected by city council March 2023.

== See also ==
- Rock County, Wisconsin
- Political subdivisions of Wisconsin
