= Charles A. Cady =

American politician

Member of the Wisconsin State Assembly from the Adams and Wood Counties district
- In office January 6, 1873 – January 4, 1875
- Preceded by: George Allen Neeves
- Succeeded by: G. M. Marshall

Personal details
- Born: September 7, 1829 Duanesburg, New York, United States
- Died: September 23, 1912 (aged 83) Kilbourn, Wisconsin
- Party: Republican

Charles A. Cady (September 7, 1829 – c. September 23, 1912) was a member of the Wisconsin State Assembly.

== Biography ==
Cady was born on September 7, 1829, in Duanesburg, New York. In 1851 he married Hellen Blood (1832–1912). They moved to Newport, Wisconsin in 1852, to Dell Prairie, Wisconsin in 1862, and to Kilbourn, Wisconsin (now Wisconsin Dells) in 1889. Cady died at his home in Kilbourn on or before September 23, 1912.

== Career ==
Cady was first a member of the Assembly from 1872 to 1873. He was elected to the Assembly again in 1879. In addition, Cady was chairman of the Dell Prairie Board of Supervisors. He was a Republican.
