= Gen. James Bintliff House =

Historic house in Wisconsin, United States

- U.S. National Register of Historic Places
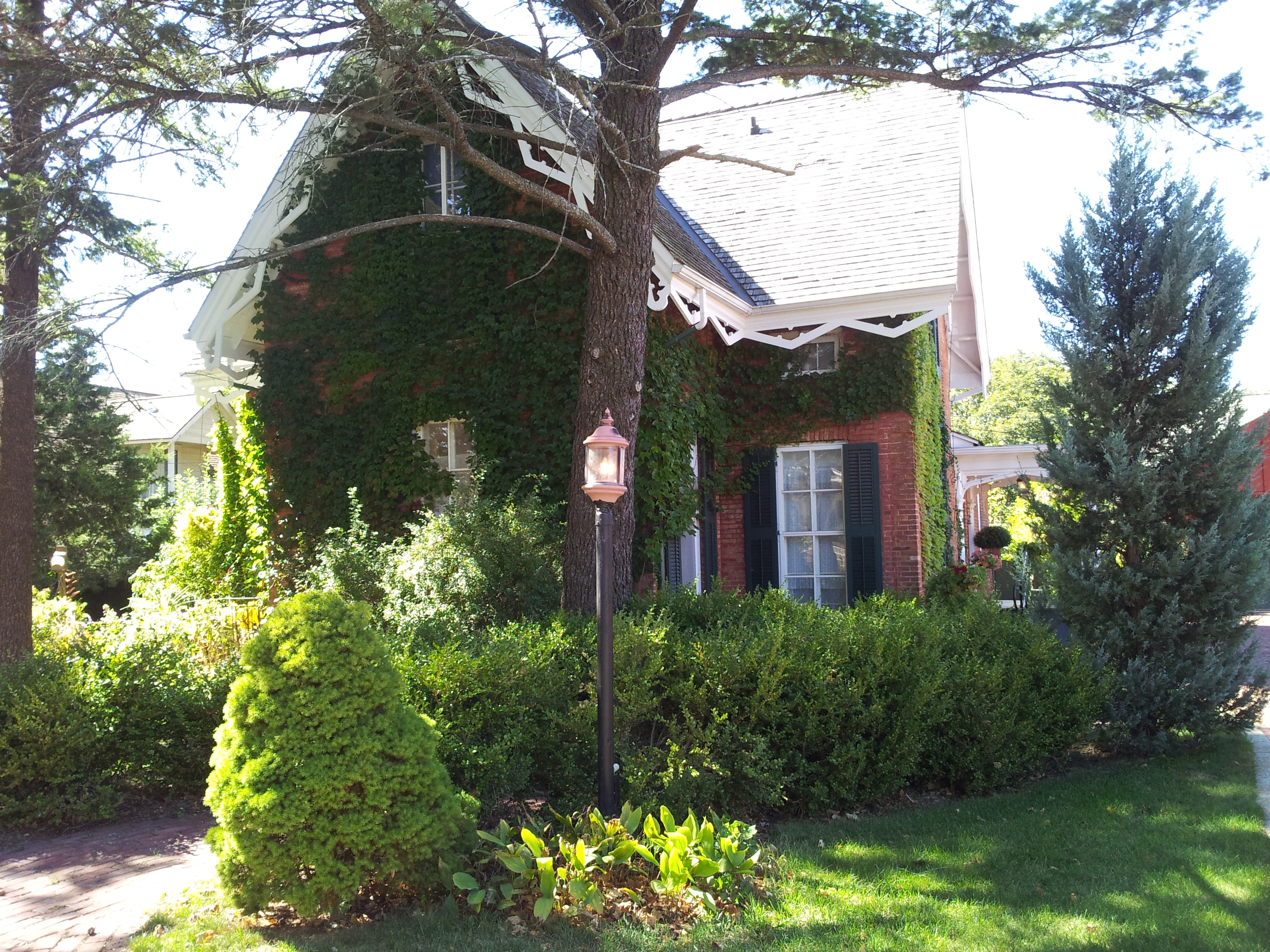

- Location within Wisconsin Location within the United States
- Location: 723 18th Ave. Monroe, Wisconsin
- Coordinates: 42°36′15″N 89°38′15″W
- Area: 0.33 acres (0.13 ha)
- Built: 1858
- Architectural style: Gothic Revival
- NRHP reference No.: 79000080
- Added to NRHP: May 14, 1979

The Gen. James Bintliff House was built in 1858 in Monroe, Wisconsin, United States. It was added to the National Register of Historic Places in 1979.

== Description and history ==
James Bintliff had immigrated from England around 1841, worked in wool factories in New York, and moved to Monroe in 1853. There he worked as a bookkeeper in a dry goods store, as a bank cashier, and as register of deeds. In 1859, he began practice as a lawyer. In 1860 he and a partner bought the Monroe Sentinel. Bintliff helped organize the Republican Party, he was against slavery, and in 1862 he raised an infantry company which was captured in the Battle of Thompson's Station in Tennessee. After release from imprisonment, Bintliff recruited the 38th Wisconsin Volunteer Infantry Regiment and commanded three regiments in the Third Battle of Petersburg. For distinguished service there, Bintliff was nominated by President Andrew Johnson on January 13, 1866, and confirmed by the U.S. Senate on March 12, 1866, for appointment to the rank of brevet brigadier general of volunteers, to rank from April 2, 1865.

Bintliff's house in Monroe is in Gothic Revival style, characterized by the steep roof, the tall windows, and the elaborate bargeboards on the gables. The walls are brick, on a brick foundation. Parts of the house are lit by 9-foot French windows. Inside are a fireplace, a porcelain and glass chandelier in the dining room, and a spiral staircase.

Bintliff lived in the house until around 1870. After him, N. C. Twining, the head of local schools lived there, then the Henry Pick family. In 1960 the Hamiltons of the Monroe Evening Times bought the house, and in this house E.C. Hamilton wrote about the history and architecture of Monroe.

The NRHP nomination describes the Bintliff house as "Monroe's best domestic example of Gothic Revival style."
