= Erastus C. Smith =

American politician

E. C. Smith

Treasurer of Rock County, Wisconsin
- In office January 1, 1857 – January 1, 1859
- Preceded by: Moses T. Walker
- Succeeded by: James M. Burgess

Member of the Wisconsin State Assembly from the Rock 5th district
- In office January 7, 1850 – January 6, 1851
- Preceded by: Josiah Willard
- Succeeded by: Joseph Kinney Jr.

Personal details
- Born: 1810 New York, U.S.
- Died: January 26, 1891 (aged 80–81) Janesville, Wisconsin, U.S.
- Resting place: Oak Hill Cemetery, Janesville
- Party: Republican; Free Soil (before 1854)
- Spouses: Mary E. Blakeslee (m. 1839; died 1879); Fannie (Wood) Stratberger (m. 1880–1891)
- Children: with Mary Blakeslee; Ora M. (Fredendall)^{(b. 1841; died 1904)}; George W. Smith^{(b. 1843; died 1865)}

Erastus C. Smith (1810 – January 26, 1891) was an American businessman, politician, and pioneer of Rock County, Wisconsin. He served one term in the Wisconsin State Assembly, representing the southwest quadrant of Rock County during the 3rd Wisconsin Legislature (1850). He was elected to the Assembly on the Free Soil Party ticket, and became a Republican when that party was established in 1854. He was one of the earliest American settlers in what is now the town of Spring Valley, Wisconsin. His name was often abbreviated as E. C. Smith.

== Biography ==
Erastus C. Smith was born in 1810 in New York state. He resided in Clinton County, New York, and Oneida County, New York, before moving west to the new state of Wisconsin. He was one of the earliest settlers in the newly-established township of Spring Valley, Rock County, Wisconsin, arriving in 1846.

He served three years as postmaster at Spring Valley, and was elected to the Wisconsin State Assembly in 1849, running on the Free Soil Party ticket. He served the district that included the towns of Avon, Center, Newark, Rock, and Spring Valley in Rock County, Wisconsin. In the 3rd Wisconsin Legislature, he was assigned to the standing committees on privileges and elections; and on expiration and enactment of laws.

In 1854, the Republican Party was created from a fusion of Whigs and Free Soil Democrats, and Smith became a member of the new Republican Party. He was elected treasurer of Rock County in 1856, running on the Republican ticket, and served a two year term.

In the late 1850s, Smith moved into the city of Janesville, Wisconsin. In 1860, he was appointed a city assessor in Janesville. In 1866 he purchased a grocery store and operated it for several years, and built a large storehouse in the city. In 1882, he became a shareholder in a boot factory in Janesville.

Smith died at his home in Janesville on January 26, 1891, after suffering from stroke paralysis for two years. His body was interred at Janesville's Oak Hill Cemetery.

Wisconsin State Assembly
Preceded by Josiah Willard	Member of the Wisconsin State Assembly from the Rock 5th district January 7, 1850 – January 6, 1851	Succeeded by Joseph Kinney Jr.
Political offices
Preceded by Moses T. Walker	Treasurer of Rock County, Wisconsin; January 1, 1857 – January 1, 1859	Succeeded by James M. Burgess
