= Allen P. Lovejoy =

American politician

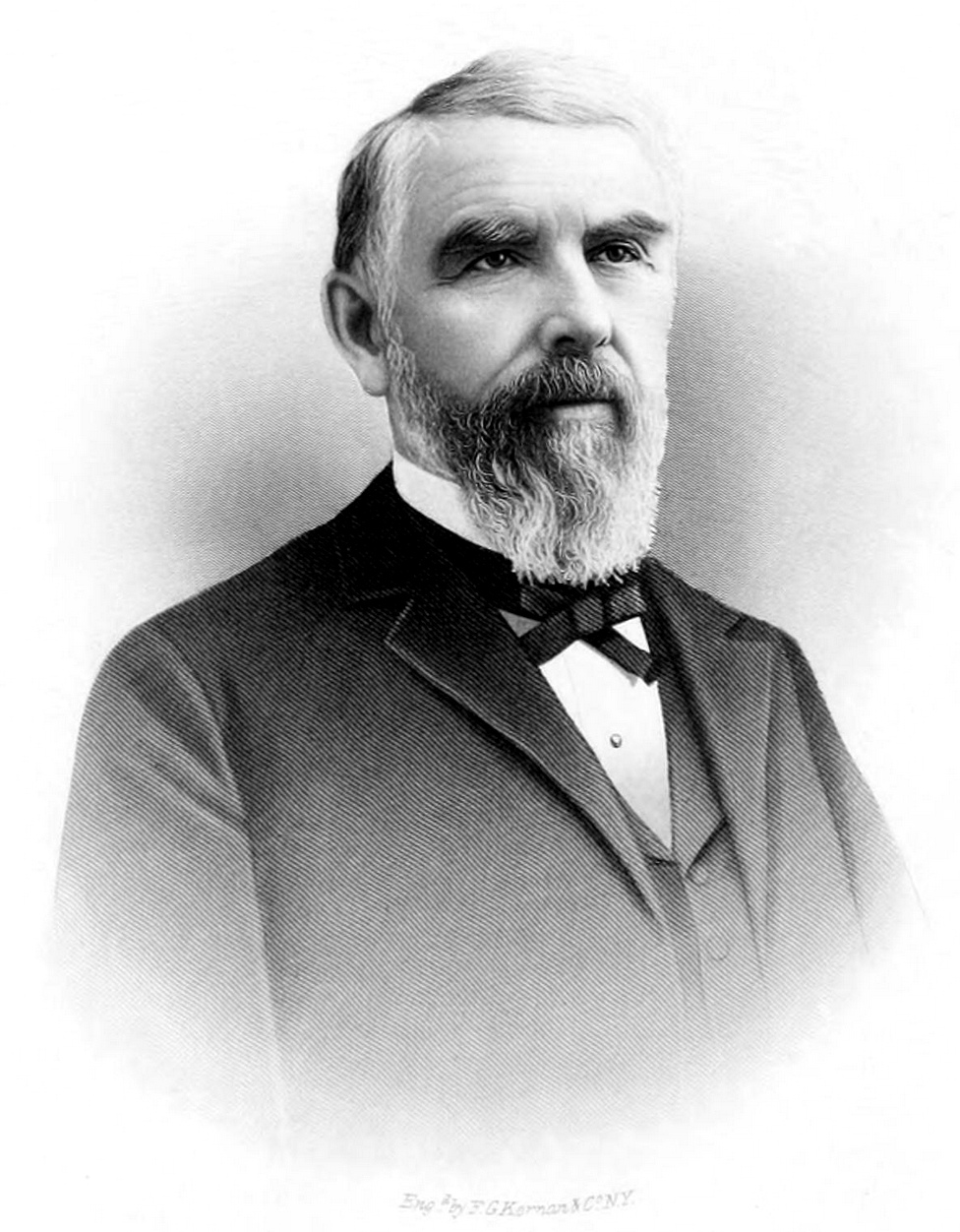

Member of the Wisconsin Senate from the 17th district
- In office January 3, 1887 – January 5, 1891
- Preceded by: Simon Lord
- Succeeded by: Richard Burdge

22nd Mayor of Janesville, Wisconsin
- In office April 1881 – April 1883
- Preceded by: Samuel C. Cobb
- Succeeded by: James W. St. John

Member of the Wisconsin State Assembly from the Rock 2nd district
- In office January 6, 1879 – January 5, 1880
- Preceded by: Fenner Kimball
- Succeeded by: Franklin S. Lawrence

Personal details
- Born: March 21, 1825 Wayne, Maine, U.S.
- Died: March 18, 1904 (aged 78) Janesville, Wisconsin, U.S.
- Resting place: Oak Hill Cemetery, Janesville
- Party: Republican
- Spouse: Julia Isbell Stow
- Children: Henry Stow Lovejoy^{(b. 1885; died 1960)}; Julia Susan (Cuniberti)^{(b. 1888; died 1987)}; Webster Ellis Lovejoy^{(b. 1891; died 1892)}; Allen Perry Lovejoy Jr.^{(b. 1892; died 1918)}
- Occupation: Lumber merchant and manufacturer

Allen Perry Lovejoy Sr. (March 21, 1825 – March 18, 1904) was an American lumber merchant, manufacturer, Republican politician, and Wisconsin pioneer. He served as the 22nd mayor of Janesville, Wisconsin, elected in 1881, and represented Rock County for four years in the Wisconsin Senate (1887–1891) and for one term in the Wisconsin State Assembly (1879).

== Biography ==
Allen Perry Lovejoy was born on March 20, 1825, in Wayne, Maine, and raised on the family farm. He attended Wesleyan Seminary, now Kents Hill School, and for a year at the age of eighteen he taught school. In 1844 he took up an apprenticeship in the carpenter and building trade, and in 1850 he moved to Janesville, eventually expanding his contractor business into lumber retailing and manufacturing, with extensive raw timber holdings in Wisconsin and Michigan. Among the business leadership positions he held were president of the Harris Manufacturing Company, vice-president of the Janesville Machine Company, president of the New McLean Manufacturing Company, director of the First National Bank, director of the State Lumber Company, and vice-president of the Merrill Lumber Company.

On May 29, 1880, he married Julia Stow of New Haven, Connecticut. They had four children: Allen, Henry, Julia and Webster (who died as an infant). Julia Lovejoy was a well-known citizen of Janesville and lived to 103. She founded the first kindergarten in Janesville, helped found the city's first hospital, and was active in the movement for women's suffrage. Allen Lovejoy was the second cousin of Owen Lovejoy and Elijah Parish Lovejoy, the famous abolitionists from Illinois. They shared the same great-grandfather, Hezekiah Lovejoy.

His former home, now part of what are known as the Lovejoy and Merrill-Nowlan Houses, is listed on the National Register of Historic Places.

== Political career ==
Lovejoy was a Republican. He served in the Wisconsin State Assembly in 1879. In 1881 he was elected mayor of Janesville. From 1887 to 1890, he served in the Wisconsin State Senate.
