= George W. Lakin =

19th century American lawyer, U.S. Attorney for Wisconsin, Member of the Wisconsin Senate

United States Attorney for the District of Wisconsin
- In office August 1849 – April 1853
- President: Zachary Taylor; Millard Fillmore
- Preceded by: A. Hyatt Smith
- Succeeded by: John R. Sharpstein

Member of the Wisconsin Senate from the 6th district
- In office June 5, 1848 – January 1, 1850
- Preceded by: Moses M. Strong
- Succeeded by: William Pitt Lynde

Personal details
- Born: March 29, 1816 Harrison, Maine, U.S.
- Died: September 13, 1884 (aged 68) Milwaukee, Wisconsin, U.S.
- Cause of death: Tuberculosis
- Resting place: Forest Home Cemetery, Milwaukee, Wisconsin
- Party: Whig
- Spouse: Statira C. Clark (m. 1847–1884)
- Children: Frances C. (Huntington)^{(b. 1846; died 1871)}; Charles W. Lakin^{(b. 1851; died 1886)}; Mildred M. Lakin^{(b. 1858; died 1936)}
- Education: Maine Wesleyan Seminary
- Profession: lawyer

George W. Lakin (March 29, 1816 – September 13, 1884) was an American schoolteacher and lawyer, originally from Maine, who became a pioneer leader of Wisconsin. He was a member of the second Wisconsin Constitutional Convention, a member of the 1st Wisconsin Legislature, and United States Attorney for the District of Wisconsin.

== Early life and education ==
George W. Lakin was born in Harrison, in Cumberland County, Maine, in March 1816. He attended public schools until about 14 years old, then went to Bridgton Academy in North Bridgton, Maine, then to the Maine Wesleyan Seminary in Readfield, from which he graduated in June 1837.

He tutored or taught school during his five years at Wesleyan; after graduating, his schoolmate of Elihu B. Washburne invited him to come teach school in East Livermore, Maine, where he lived for some time at the home of Washburn's father, Israel Washburn. Lakin was well compensated by the Washburns and, in May 1838, he began to read law while continuing to teach school at a number of schools in various towns around Maine.

In the Fall of 1839 he went west, eventually ending up teaching school in the Cook Settlement of southeastern St. Francois County, Missouri. He moved to Ste. Genevieve, Missouri, in 1840 and was invited to live and study law with the former congressman John Scott, who was then living there. In the Summer of 1841, Lakin was admitted to the bar in Missouri. That Fall, he went north to the Wisconsin Territory and set up a legal practice in Platteville.

== Public office ==
In 1846, Wisconsin began the process of becoming a U.S. state. The first constitution they devised was rejected by voters in an April 1847 referendum, and a second constitutional convention was called for the following Winter. Lakin was elected on the Whig Party ticket to serve as a delegate from Grant County to that second constitutional convention. The constitution they produced was approved by voters in 1848. The following February, he was elected to serve in the first session of the Wisconsin State Senate, representing all of Grant County.

In the Fall of 1849, he was named United States Attorney for Wisconsin by President Zachary Taylor. He served in the office through to the end of the term of Millard Fillmore.

== After public office ==
He moved to Milwaukee in 1854, and derived a significant proportion of his business from the lawyers in the western part of Wisconsin and in the Galena, Illinois, and Dubuque, Iowa, regions who had contended with him in the past.

In January 1855, Lakin was one of the defense attorneys involved in the defense of John Ryecraft (one of the people who helped free runaway slave Joshua Glover), arguing that the defendant, in freeing a slave, acted in accord with the higher law.

He died of Tuberculosis at his home in Milwaukee on September 13, 1884.

== Personal life ==
Lakin was a Freemason, and served as secretary of the December 1843 Masonic convention which led to the creation of the Grand Lodge of Wisconsin. On June 2, 1847, he married Statira C. Clark, "late of Danville, Me." in Potosi. They had three children, Fannie, Mildred and Charles.

Wisconsin Senate
Preceded by Moses M. Strong	Member of the Wisconsin Senate from the 6th district June 5, 1848 – January 1, 1850	Succeeded by William Pitt Lynde
Legal offices
Preceded by A. Hyatt Smith	United States Attorney for the District of Wisconsin; August 1849 – April 1853	Succeeded by John R. Sharpstein
