= Oxford, Wisconsin =

- Village
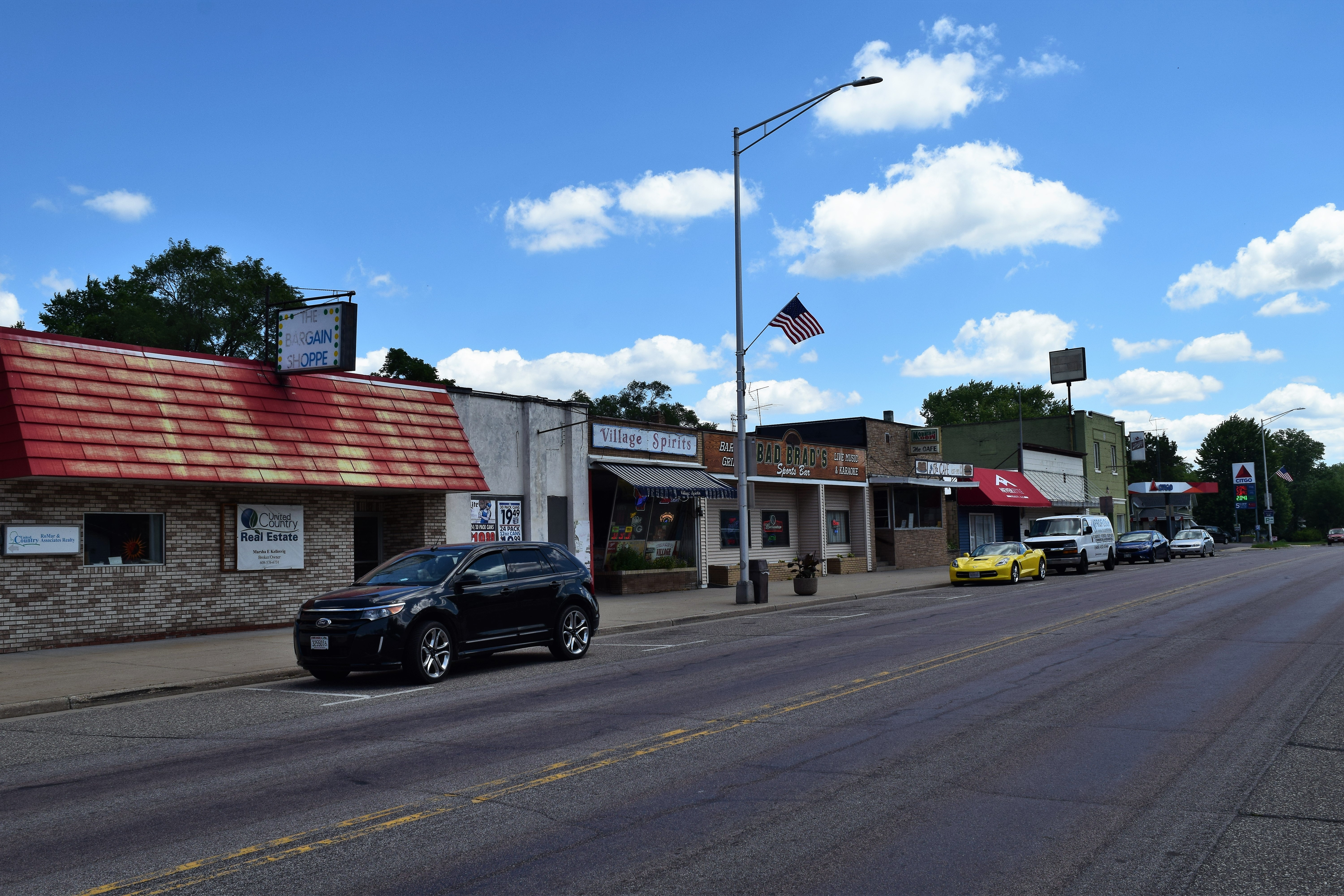
- Businesses on WIS 82 in downtown Oxford

- Location of Oxford in Marquette County, Wisconsin
- Coordinates: 43°46′21″N 89°32′43″W
- Country: United States
- State: Wisconsin
- County: Marquette
- Incorporated: September 4, 1912

Area
  - Total: 0.86 sq mi (2.23 km^{2})
  - Land: 0.84 sq mi (2.17 km^{2})
  - Water: 0.023 sq mi (0.06 km^{2})
- Elevation: 869 ft (265 m)

Population (2020)
  - Total: 537
  - Density: 719/sq mi (277.7/km^{2})
- Time zone: UTC-6 (Central (CST))
  - Summer (DST): UTC-5 (CDT)
- Area code: 608
- FIPS code: 55-60900
- GNIS feature ID: 1570978
- Website: https://villageofoxfordwi.com/

Oxford is a village in Marquette County, Wisconsin, United States. The population was 537 at the 2020 census. The village is located within the Town of Oxford. The Union Pacific Railroad runs through the town and over Neenah Lake to the northwest.

== Geography ==
Oxford is located at 43°46′47″N 89°34′11″W (43.77999, -89.569947).

According to the United States Census Bureau, the village has a total area of 1.04 square miles (2.69 km^{2}), of which 1.01 square miles (2.62 km^{2}) is land and 0.03 square miles (0.08 km^{2}) is water.

The village lies on Wisconsin Highway 82 between two small lakes: Oxford Lake and Neenah Lake. It is approximately five miles west of Interstate 39.

== Demographics ==
Historical population
Census	Pop.	Note	%±
1920	416		—
1930	397		−4.6%
1940	404		1.8%
1950	509		26.0%
1960	548		7.7%
1970	453		−17.3%
1980	432		−4.6%
1990	499		15.5%
2000	536		7.4%
2010	607		13.2%
2020	537		−11.5%
U.S. Decennial Census

=== 2010 census ===
As of the census of 2010, there were 608 people, 248 households, and 155 families living in the village. The population density was 601.0 inhabitants per square mile (232.0/km^{2}). There were 283 housing units at an average density of 280.2 per square mile (108.2/km^{2}). The racial makeup of the village was 93.9% White, 0.5% African American, 0.3% Native American, 1.3% Asian, 3.1% from other races, and 0.8% from two or more races. Hispanic or Latino people of any race were 4.8% of the population.

There were 248 households, of which 31.9% had children under the age of 18 living with them, 44.4% were married couples living together, 11.7% had a female householder with no husband present, 6.5% had a male householder with no wife present, and 37.5% were non-families. 30.6% of all households were made up of individuals, and 13.3% had someone living alone who was 65 years of age or older. The average household size was 2.45 and the average family size was 2.99.

The median age in the village was 37.5 years. 25.4% of residents were under the age of 18; 9.8% were between the ages of 18 and 24; 25.3% were from 25 to 44; 26.7% were from 45 to 64; and 12.7% were 65 years of age or older. The gender makeup of the village was 49.9% male and 50.1% female.

=== 2000 census ===
As of the census of 2000, there were 536 people, 223 households, and 136 families living in the village. The population density was 536.3 people per square mile (207.0/km^{2}). There were 259 housing units at an average density of 259.1 per square mile (100.0/km^{2}). The racial makeup of the village was 96.64% White, 1.49% Black or African American, 0.19% Native American, 0.56% Asian, 0.56% from other races, and 0.56% from two or more races. 1.87% of the population were Hispanic or Latino of any race.

There were 223 households, out of which 30.9% had children under the age of 18 living with them, 48.0% were married couples living together, 9.4% had a female householder with no husband present, and 38.6% were non-families. 33.6% of all households were made up of individuals, and 20.6% had someone living alone who was 65 years of age or older. The average household size was 2.40 and the average family size was 3.10.

In the village, the population was spread out, with 27.8% under the age of 18, 8.8% from 18 to 24, 27.1% from 25 to 44, 18.3% from 45 to 64, and 18.1% who were 65 years of age or older. The median age was 36 years. For every 100 females, there were 88.1 males. For every 100 females age 18 and over, there were 94.5 males.

The median income for a household in the village was $35,481, and the median income for a family was $42,292. Males had a median income of $29,792 versus $22,083 for females. The per capita income for the village was $16,103. About 11.5% of families and 14.3% of the population were below the poverty line, including 17.4% of those under age 18 and 18.5% of those age 65 or over.

== Economy ==
The nearby Oxford Federal Correctional Institution is located on Hwy G in Brooks, an unincorporated community in Adams County.

== Education ==
It is in the Westfield School District.

== Notable people ==
- J.A. Hines, Wisconsin legislator

== Images ==
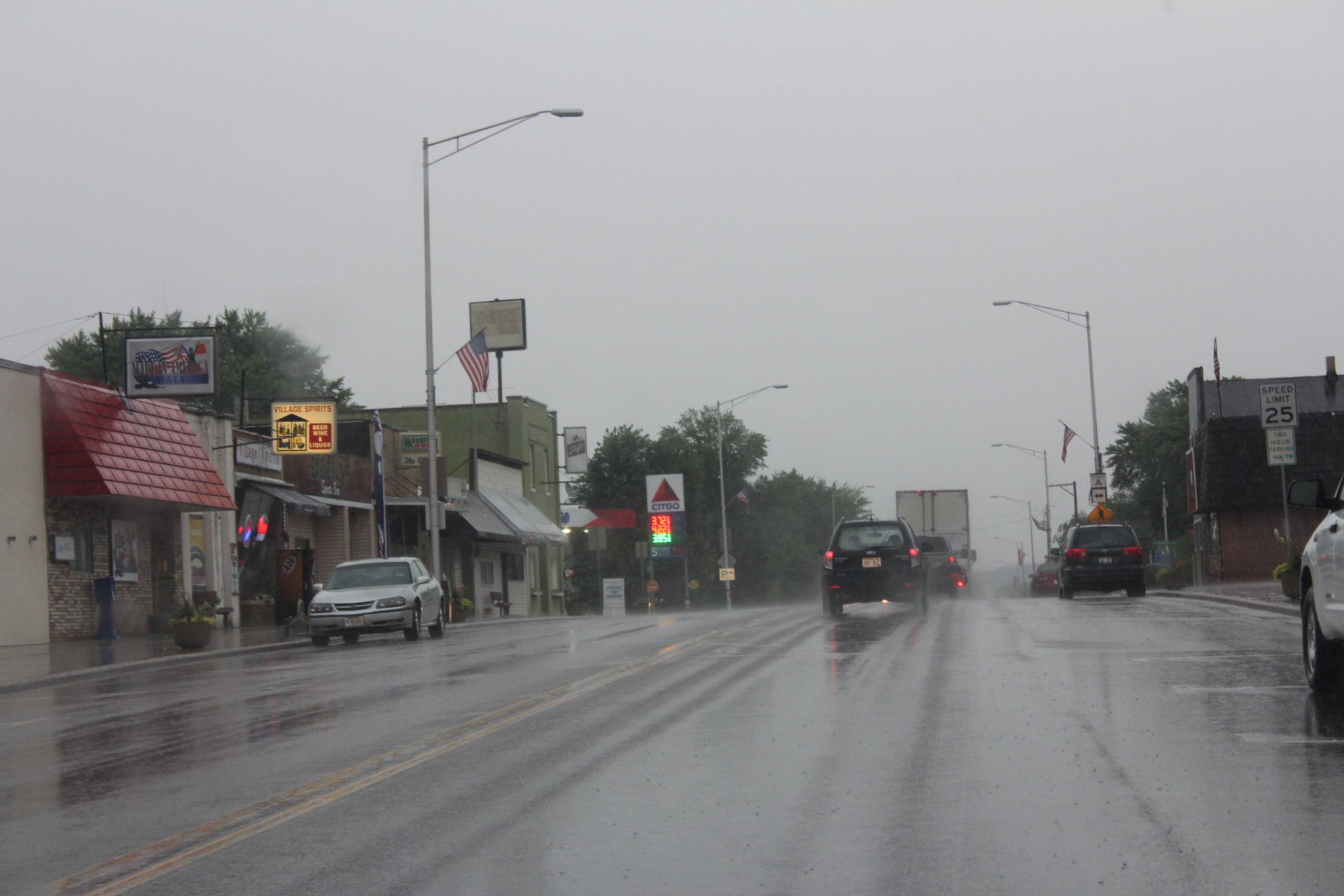
Looking east at Oxford on WIS 82

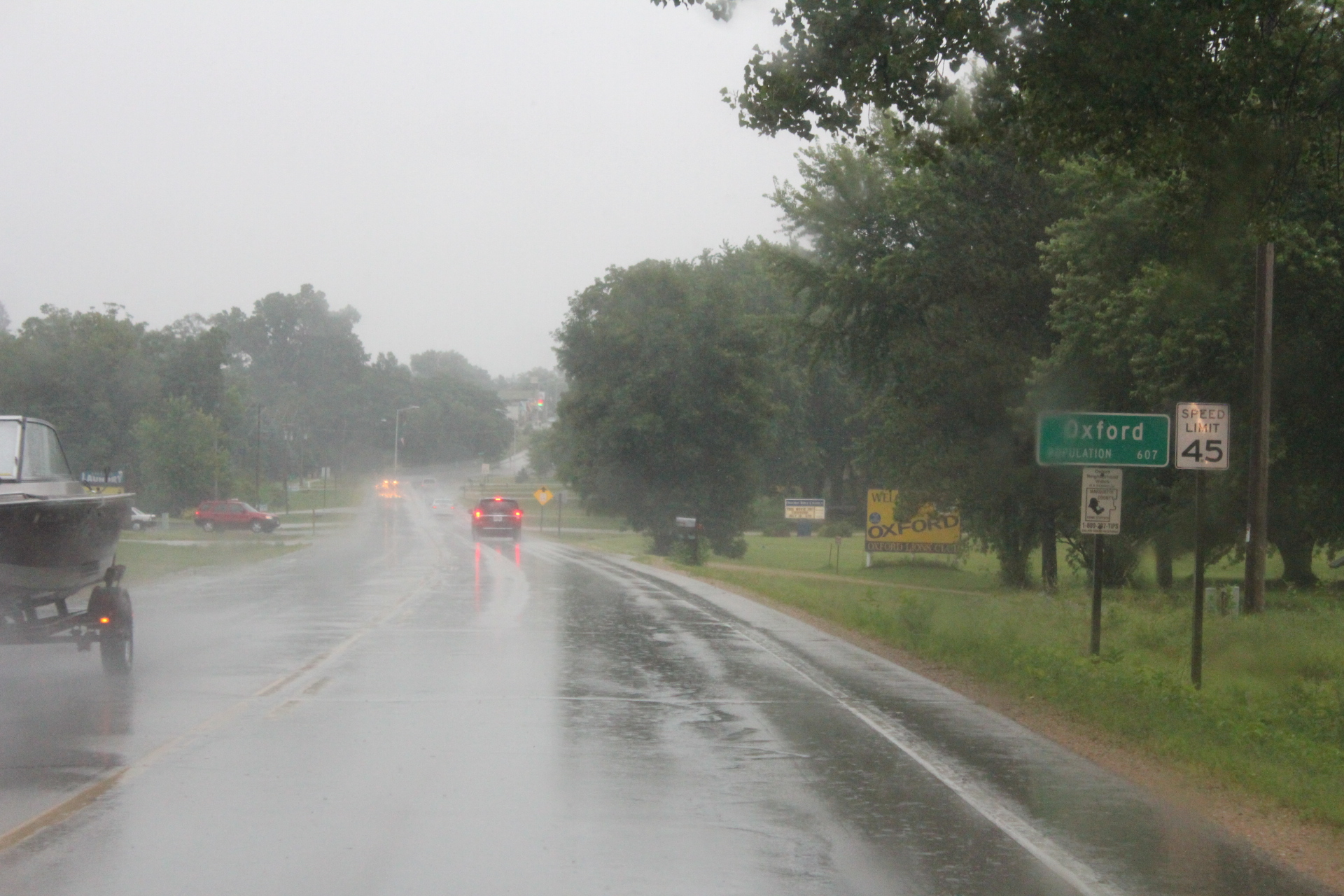
Sign for Oxford on WIS 82

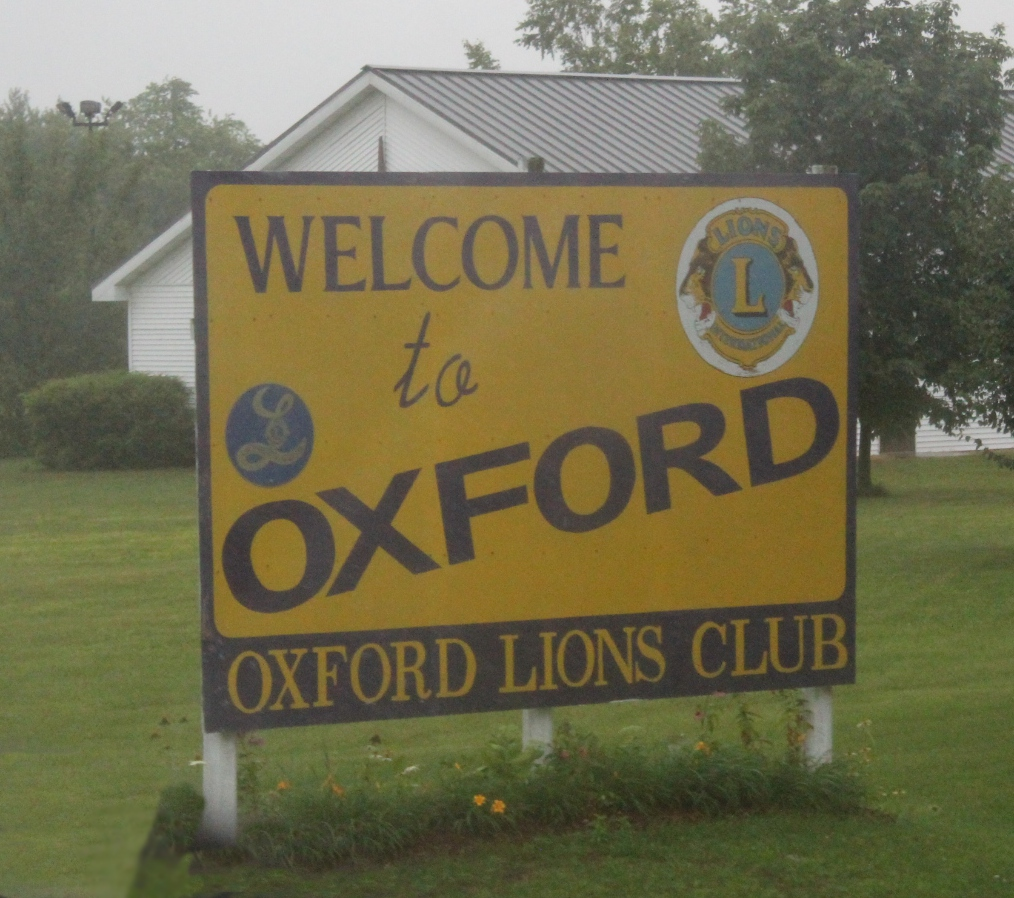
Welcome sign

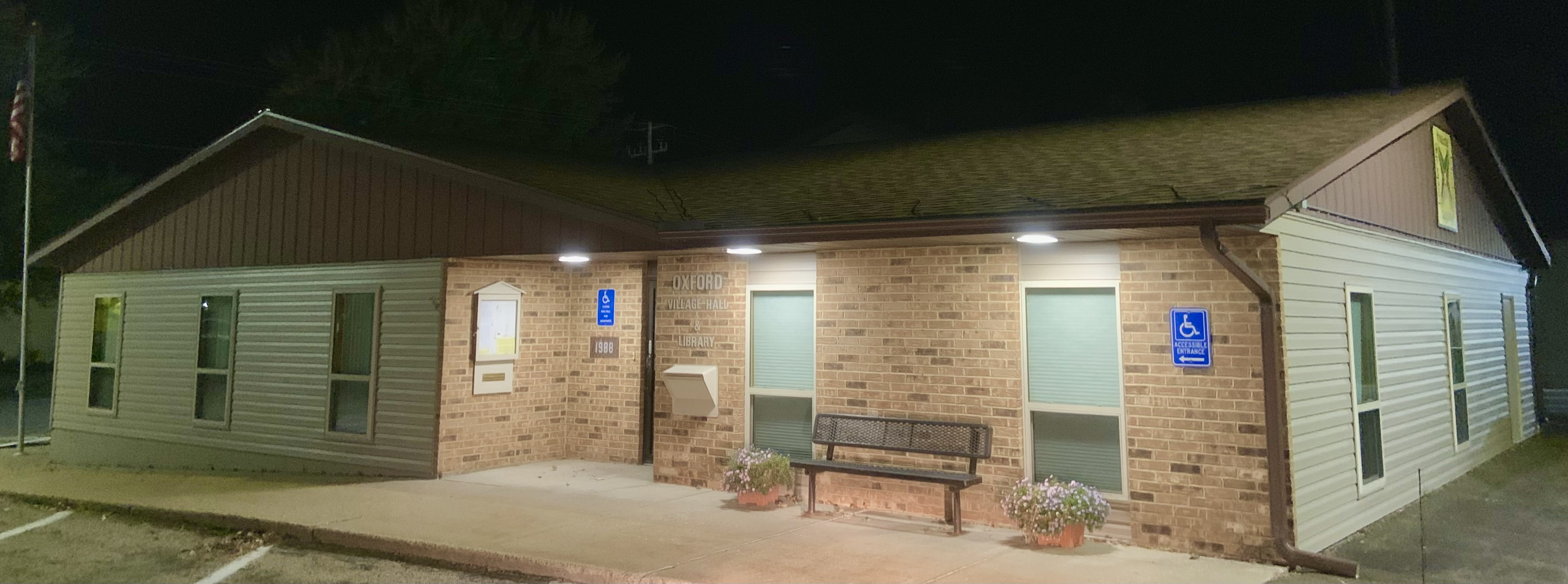
Oxford Village Hall
