= Halvor H. Peterson =

American politician

Halvor Halvorson Haugan Peterson (March 21, 1831 – July 24, 1917) was an American farmer and politician.

Peterson was born in Numedal, Norway. He emigrated with his parents to the United States in 1839 and eventually settled in the town of Spring Valley, Rock County, Wisconsin Territory in 1844. Peterson was a farmer. He served on the Spring Valley Town Board and was chairman of the town board. In 1871, Peterson served in the Wisconsin Assembly and was a Republican. In 1878, Peterson moved with his wife to a farm in Elk Township, Buena Vista County, Iowa. They then moved to Alta, Iowa in 1888. Peterson died in Alta, Iowa.
