= Spring Valley (town), Wisconsin =

Town in Rock County, Wisconsin

Spring Valley, Wisconsin
- Town
- Town of Spring Valley
- Location within Rock County, Wisconsin

- Location of Rock County, Wisconsin
- Coordinates: 42°37′30″N 89°18′33″W
- Country: United States
- State: Wisconsin
- County: Rock

Area
  - Total: 34.86 sq mi (90.3 km^{2})
  - Land: 34.83 sq mi (90.2 km^{2})
  - Water: 0.03 sq mi (0.078 km^{2})

Population (2020)
  - Total: 728
  - Density: 20.9/sq mi (8.07/km^{2})
- Time zone: UTC-6 (Central (CST))
  - Summer (DST): UTC-5 (CDT)
- Area code(s): 608 and 353
- GNIS feature ID: 1584204

The town of Spring Valley is located in Rock County, in the U.S. state of Wisconsin. The population was 728 at the 2020 census. The only incorporated municipality in the town is the village of Orfordville.

== Geography ==
According to the United States Census Bureau, the town has a total area of 35.1 square miles (90.9 km^{2}), all land.

== Demographics ==
As of the census of 2000, there were 813 people, 282 households, and 227 families residing in the town. The population density was 23.2 people per square mile (8.9/km^{2}). There were 291 housing units at an average density of 8.3 per square mile (3.2/km^{2}). The racial makeup of the town was 98.52% White, 0.12% Asian, 0.62% from other races, and 0.74% from two or more races. Hispanic or Latino of any race were 0.86% of the population.

There were 282 households, out of which 37.9% had children under the age of 18 living with them, 70.9% were married couples living together, 5.7% had a female householder with no husband present, and 19.5% were non-families. 16.7% of all households were made up of individuals, and 7.1% had someone living alone who was 65 years of age or older. The average household size was 2.88 and the average family size was 3.22.

In the town, the population was spread out, with 28.3% under the age of 18, 7.3% from 18 to 24, 27.7% from 25 to 44, 27.7% from 45 to 64, and 9.1% who were 65 years of age or older. The median age was 39 years. For every 100 females, there were 105.3 males. For every 100 females age 18 and over, there were 104.6 males.

The median income for a household in the town was $54,375, and the median income for a family was $57,031. Males had a median income of $45,000 versus $23,000 for females. The per capita income for the town was $21,098. About 2.6% of families and 4.2% of the population were below the poverty line, including 8.0% of those under age 18 and 4.3% of those age 65 or over.

== Notable people ==
- Halvor H. Peterson, member of the Wisconsin State Assembly and farmer
- E. C. Smith, Free Soil Party member of the Wisconsin State Assembly
