= Burton Millard =

19th century American politician

Member of the Wisconsin State Assembly from the Marathon–Portage–Wood district
- In office January 4, 1858 – January 3, 1859
- Preceded by: Anson Rood
- Succeeded by: James S. Young

Personal details
- Born: 1828 Scio, New York, U.S.
- Died: April 7, 1862 (aged 33–34) Lee's Mill Earthworks, Virginia
- Resting place: Yorktown National Cemetery, Yorktown, Virginia
- Party: Republican
- Spouse: Harriet Crown (died 1922)
- Children: Arthur Burton Millard^{(b. 1857; died 1915)}; Paul Juneau Millard^{(b. 1859; died 1947)}

Military service
- Allegiance: United States
- Branch/service: United States Volunteers; Union Army
- Years of service: 1861–1862
- Rank: Commissary Sergeant
- Unit: 5th Reg. Wis. Vol. Infantry
- Battles/wars: American Civil War: Peninsula campaign; Siege of Yorktown

Burton Millard (1828 – April 7, 1862) was an American machinist and Republican politician. He served one term in the Wisconsin State Assembly. He died at the Siege of Yorktown during the American Civil War.

== Biography ==
Born in Scio, New York, Millard moved to Wausau, Wisconsin. He owned a machine shop. In 1855, he served as Sheriff of Marathon County, Wisconsin, and coroner of the county. In 1858, Millard served in the Wisconsin State Assembly. He served as a commissary sergeant in the 5th Wisconsin Infantry Regiment during the American Civil War and was killed while on duty in Lee's Mill Earthworks, Virginia.
