= Tom Morrissey (baseball) =

American baseball player (1860–1941)

- Third baseman
- Born: May 1860; Janesville, Wisconsin, U.S.
- Died: September 23, 1941 (aged 81); Janesville, Wisconsin, U.S.
- Batted: Unknown Threw: Unknown

MLB debut
- July 12, 1882, for the Detroit Wolverines

Last MLB appearance
- October 12, 1884, for the Milwaukee Brewers (UA)

MLB statistics
- Games played: 14
- Hits: 10
- Batting average: .185
- Stats at Baseball Reference

Teams
- Detroit Wolverines (1882); Milwaukee Brewers (UA) (1884)

Tom J. Morrissey (May, 1860 – September 23, 1941) was an American Major League Baseball player from Janesville, Wisconsin, who played third base for the 1882 Detroit Wolverines of the National League, and the 1884 Milwaukee Brewers of the Union Association. In his 14-game Major League career, he batted 54 times, collected 10 hits for a .185 batting average. In the field, he committed 11 errors for a .711 fielding percentage. His brother John Morrissey also played Major League Baseball.

Morrissey died at the age of 81 in his hometown of Janesville, and is interred at Mount Olivet Cemetery.
