= William A. Lawrence (Wisconsin politician) =

American politician (1822–1890)

Member of the Wisconsin Senate from the 17th district
- In office January 5, 1863 – January 7, 1867
- Preceded by: Ezra Foot
- Succeeded by: S. J. Todd

6th Mayor of Janesville, Wisconsin
- In office April 1858 – April 1859
- Preceded by: A. Hyatt Smith
- Succeeded by: Sanford Amos Hudson

Member of the Wisconsin State Assembly from the Rock 1st district
- In office January 5, 1852 – January 3, 1853
- Preceded by: William F. Tompkins
- Succeeded by: William D. Murray

Personal details
- Born: William Azra Lawrence; March 26, 1822 Weathersfield, Vermont, U.S.
- Died: August 12, 1890 (aged 68) Janesville, Wisconsin, U.S.
- Resting place: Oak Hill Cemetery, Janesville
- Party: Prohibition (later years); Republican; Whig (before 1854)
- Spouses: Martha J. Allen (died 1860); Sarah Kelly Emerson (m. 1865–1890)
- Children: Frank Azra Lawrence^{(b. 1847; died 1884)}; Mary Estella Lawrence^{(b. 1856; died 1860)}
- Relatives: Franklin S. Lawrence (brother)

William Azra Lawrence (March 26, 1822 – August 12, 1890) was an American businessman, politician, and Wisconsin pioneer. He served as the 6th mayor of Janesville, elected in 1858; throughout his life he was a major influence on the early economic activity in the city. He represented Rock County for four years in the Wisconsin Senate (1863–1867), and for one year in the Wisconsin State Assembly (1852).

His younger brother, Franklin S. Lawrence, also served in the Wisconsin Assembly, and was a frequent collaborator in his business and political affairs.

== Biography ==
William Lawrence was born in Windsor County, Vermont, in March 1822. He was educated in the local schools and had one term of academy education. At age 15, he began working as a clerk in a general store, and then took on the same role for a store in Springfield, Vermont.

His father went west to the Wisconsin Territory in 1844 and established a homestead in what is now the town of Rutland, Wisconsin, in Dane County. William, then 22, escorted his mother and siblings on the journey to join their father in October of that year.

In Wisconsin, Lawrence found employment as a clerk at a merchant business in Janesville, but after a year in that role, he went into business for himself in partnership with Luke Stoughton (the founder of Stoughton, Wisconsin). Their firm, known as Stoughton, Lawrence, & Co., operated stores in Janesville and Cooksville. In 1847, the partnership with Stoughton dissolved, and Lawrence formed a new business with Volney Atwood and Elihu Strong. Strong exited the business in 1852, but the firm of Lawrence & Atwood endured for the next 37 years. Over the decades, their business evolved, adding different products and interests, including coal, lime, cement, stoves, tins, and other hardware.

Lawrence was elected to his first public offices in 1847, when he was elected town clerk and county treasurer; he served three years as treasurer and then an additional term as deputy treasurer. In 1851, he was elected to the Wisconsin State Assembly, running on the Whig Party ticket. In 1852, Lawrence served as a delegate to the 1852 Whig National Convention. That fall, he ran for re-election to the Assembly, but lost the election by 15 votes.

While pursuing political office, Lawrence was also growing his business interests; in 1851, he was one of the organizers of the Rock River Valley Union Railway Company, which later became part of the Chicago and North Western Railway, and, in 1855, he was one of the organizers and directors of the Central Bank of Wisconsin. He was also one of the founders of the Janesville Mutual Life Insurance Company, in 1857, but remained in that business for only a year; that insurance company was later acquired by a firm led by Henry L. Palmer, moved to Milwaukee, and became the Northwestern Mutual Insurance Company.

Like many Whigs, Lawrence became a member of the Republican Party when that party was organized in 1854. He was elected mayor of Janesville in April 1858, serving a one year term. In 1862, he was elected to the Wisconsin Senate, representing all of Rock County; he was re-elected to another two-year term in 1864. In the Senate, he served as chair of the joint committee on finance. In 1866, he was elected to the Janesville Board of Education; he was a member of the board for the next eight years, and was president for four years. In the 1870s, Lawrence fell out with the Republican Party and, in 1874, ran for another term in state Senate as an independent; he lost that election to incumbent Republican Horatio N. Davis. Ultimately, Lawrence affiliated with the Prohibition Party in his later years.

He remained active in new business enterprises, and was one of the organizers and directors of the Wisconsin Shoe Company in 1878. The shoe company briefly became a significant employer in Janesville, and Lawrence served as president of the company until 1887. In 1879, Lawrence & Atwood also began operating manufacturing facilities for woolen goods, under the firm Janesville Cotton Manufacturing Co., for which Lawrence served as president; in 1881 Lawrence was also one of the organizers of the Janesville Machine Company.

== Personal life and family ==
William Lawrence was the eldest of four known children of Jonathan Lawrence (1782–1852) and his wife Betsey (née Martin; 1793–1874). William's younger brother, Franklin S. Lawrence, also served two terms in the Wisconsin State Assembly. The Lawrence family were descendants of the English colonist John Lawrence (1609–1667), an early settler at Watertown, Massachusetts.

William Lawrence married twice. He married Martha Allen in March 1847; they had two children together, but Martha and their daughter Mary both died in 1860. After Martha's death, Lawrence married Sarah Kelley Roys (née Emerson) in 1865; Sarah Roys was the widow of Samuel H. Roys; there were no known children from this second marriage, but Lawrence became stepfather to Sarah's son Rufus and daughter Nancy. Lawrence outlived both of his biological children, his son, Frank Azra Lawrence had a brief business career before his death in 1884.

William Lawrence died in Janesville on August 12, 1890.
