= Federal Correctional Institution, Oxford =

Federal prison in Wisconsin, United States

Coordinates: 43°51′55″N 89°38′58″W

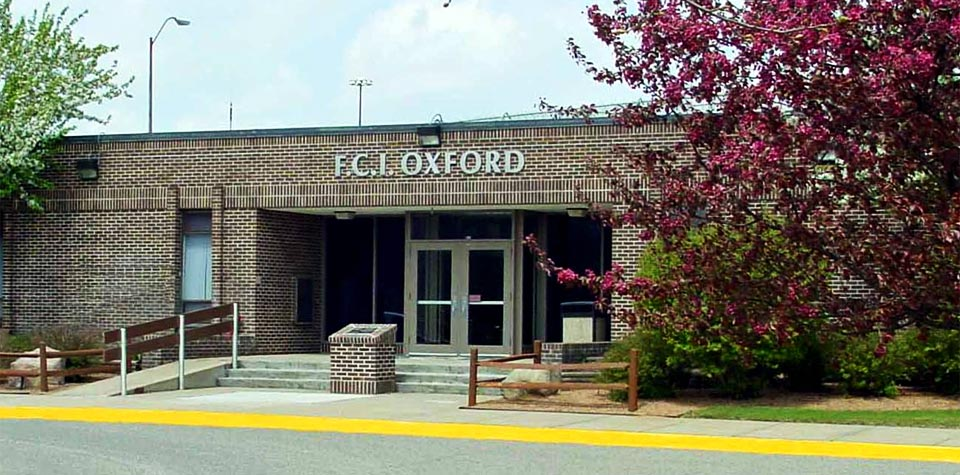
- Interactive map of Federal Correctional Institution, Oxford
- Location: New Chester, Adams County, near Oxford, Wisconsin
- Status: Operational
- Security class: low-security
- Population: 1,000
- Managed by: Federal Bureau of Prisons

The Federal Correctional Institution, Oxford (FCI Oxford) is a low-security United States federal prison for male inmates in Wisconsin. It is operated by the Federal Bureau of Prisons, a division of the United States Department of Justice.

FCI Oxford is located in the town of New Chester, Adams County, in central Wisconsin, 60 miles (97 km) north of Madison, the state capital.

== Notable incidents ==
On June 21, 2011, Timothy Washington (15022–047), a 48-year-old inmate serving a sentence for drug trafficking, stabbed another inmate with a homemade prison weapon known as a shank. The victim suffered 16 stab wounds, but survived the assault. Washington pleaded guilty to assault with a dangerous weapon in February 2012 and was sentenced to an additional 33 months in prison. He was transferred to USP Terre Haute and was released on February 16, 2021.

== Notable inmates (current and former) ==
Inmate name	Register number	Photo	Status	Details
Dan Rostenkowski	25338-016		Released in 1997 after serving 17 months; pardoned in 2000 by President Bill Clinton.	Former Illinois Congressman and Chairman of the House Ways and Means Committee; arrested in connection with the Jack Abramoff Indian lobbying scandal; pleaded guilty to mail fraud in 1996 for using federal money to pay for personal favors and gifts.
Carlos Almonte	61800–050		Serving a 20-year sentence; scheduled for release on June 20, 2027.	Pleaded guilty to conspiracy for planning murders outside of America, as well as attempting to join Al Shabaab.
George Papadopoulos	91344-083		Released on December 7, 2018, after serving 12 days of a 14-day sentence.	Pleaded guilty to making a false statement to FBI investigators, a felony.

== See also ==
- List of U.S. federal prisons
- Federal Bureau of Prisons
- Incarceration in the United States
