= Mount Olivet Cemetery (Janesville, Wisconsin) =

Roman Catholic cemetery

Coordinates: 42.7042°N 89.0413°W

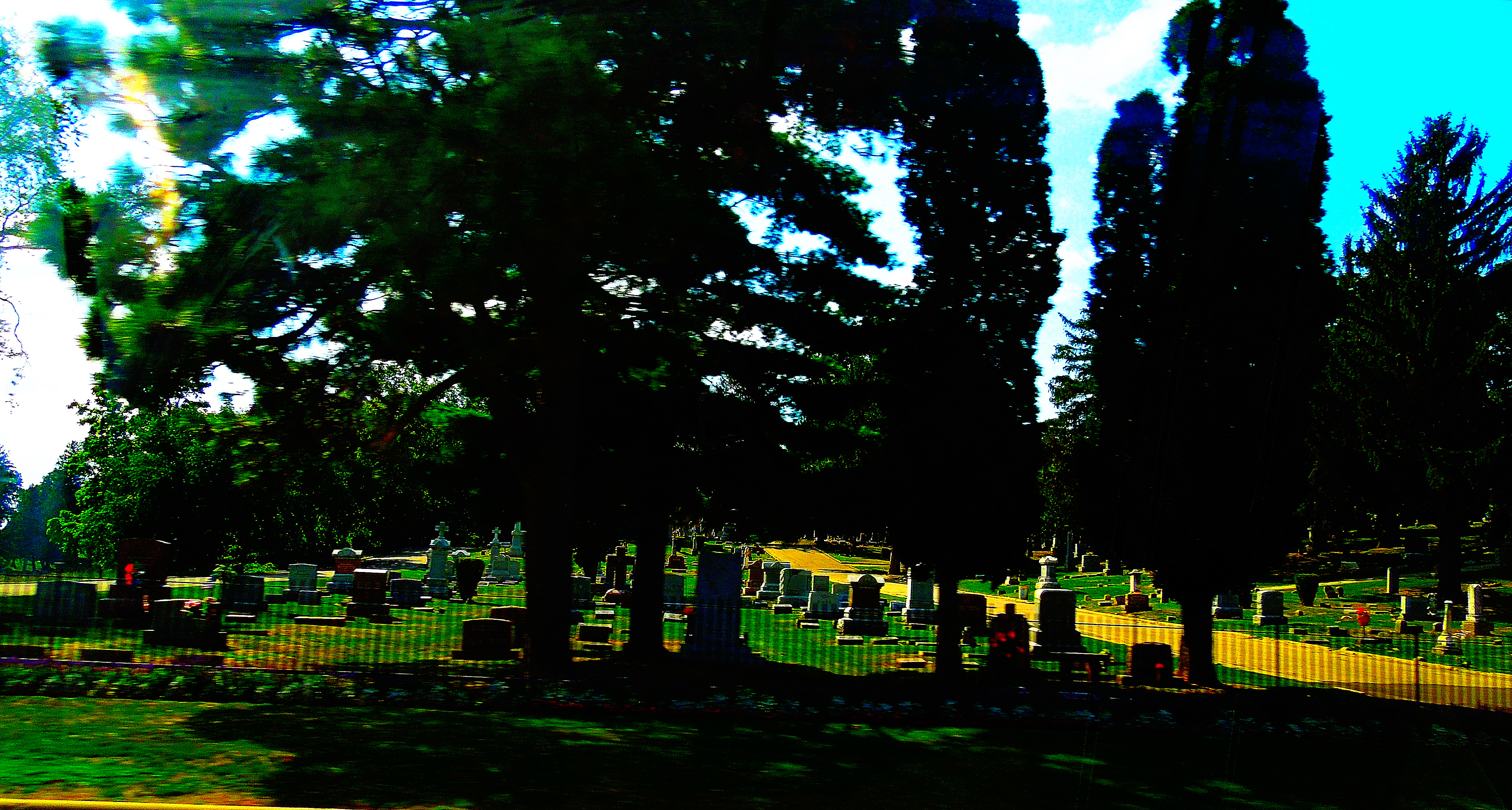
- Interactive map of Mount Olivet Cemetery

Details
- Location: 1827 N. Washington St., Janesville, Wisconsin
- Country: United States
- Type: Roman Catholic cemetery

Mount Olivet Cemetery is a Roman Catholic cemetery in Janesville, Wisconsin. It is located on the west side of the Rock River at 1827 North Washington Street. The cemetery is operated by the Roman Catholic Diocese of Madison Cemeteries; it sits adjacent to Janesville's larger non-denominational Oak Hill Cemetery.

== History ==
Mount Olivet Cemetery was established in Janesville after the local cemetery located atop Courthouse Hill was moved to a new cemetery called Oak Hill at the northwest edge of the city, in 1851. Catholic residents of the city, organized as the Mount Olivet Cemetery Association, established a cemetery on 40 acres adjacent to Oak Hill Cemetery. The Catholic cemetery was originally called St. Patrick's, after the local Catholic church, but when a second Catholic church was established, it was renamed Mount Olivet. Later, additional land was added to the cemetery. A small Romanesque Revival style chapel was added to the cemetery in 1901. It contains a replica of Michelangelo's Pietà.

In the early 1970s, the diocese incorporated the cemetery into the diocesan cemetery network. It serves the parishes of St. William, St. John Vianney, St. Patrick, and Nativity of Mary in Janesville.

== Notable burials ==
- John Morrissey, Major League Baseball
- Tom Morrissey, Major League Baseball
- Father George Strickner, Catholic missionary
- Joseph Reilly, World War II veteran, Band of Brothers
