= John Morrissey (baseball) =

American baseball player (1856–1884)

- Third baseman
- Born: December 30, 1856; Janesville, Wisconsin, U.S.
- Died: April 29, 1884 (aged 27); Janesville, Wisconsin, U.S.
- Batted: Unknown Threw: Unknown

MLB debut
- May 2, 1881, for the Buffalo Bisons

Last MLB appearance
- May 14, 1881, for the Buffalo Bisons

MLB statistics
- Games: 12
- Hits: 10
- Average: .213
- Stats at Baseball Reference

Teams
- Buffalo Bisons (1881)

John J. Morrissey (December 30, 1856 – April 29, 1884) was an American Major League Baseball player from Janesville, Wisconsin, who played third base for the 1881 Buffalo Bisons. His Major League career lasted 12 games over the course of 13 days. From May 2 to May 12, he batted 47 times, collected 10 hits for a .213 batting average. In the field, he committed five errors for a .865 fielding percentage. His brother Tom Morrissey also played Major League Baseball.

Morrissey died of consumption (tuberculosis) in his hometown of Janesville, and is interred at Mount Olivet Cemetery.
