= Franklin S. Lawrence =

American politician (1824–1897)

Member of the Wisconsin State Assembly from the Rock 2nd district
- In office January 5, 1880 – January 2, 1882
- Preceded by: Allen P. Lovejoy
- Succeeded by: John Winans

Personal details
- Born: February 20, 1824 Weathersfield, Vermont, U.S.
- Died: August 2, 1897 (aged 73) Janesville, Wisconsin, U.S.
- Resting place: Oak Hill Cemetery, Janesville
- Party: Republican
- Spouse: Hannah Maria Fuller (m. 1846; died 1889)
- Children: Herbert J. Lawrence^{(b. 1851; died 1938)}; Ella E. (Tenney)^{(b. 1854; died 1925)}
- Relatives: William A. Lawrence (brother)

Franklin Sheldon Lawrence (February 20, 1824 – August 2, 1897) was an American farmer, businessman, Republican politician, and Wisconsin pioneer. He served two terms in the Wisconsin State Assembly, representing Janesville, Wisconsin, during the 1880 and 1881 terms.

His elder brother, William A. Lawrence, also served in the Wisconsin Legislature, and often employed Franklin in his business and political ventures.

== Biography ==
Franklin Lawrence was born in Windsor County, Vermont, in February 1824. He was educated in the local common schools. In 1844, he accompanied his father on a journey to the Wisconsin Territory, where both men acquired land in what is now the town of Rutland, Wisconsin, in Dane County. In the late 1840s, Lawrence began residing in Janesville, Wisconsin, where his brother had become well established; he ultimately sold out of his Rutland farm in 1852.

In Janesville, Lawrence was appointed deputy county treasurer in 1849 by his brother, William, who was then treasurer. He later served as deputy city clerk, in 1853. He affiliated with the Republican Party and won his first elected office in 1855, when he was elected to the Janesville City Council. During that city council term the city's first fire department was organized, and Lawrence then served as the first foreman of the fire department.

In business, he was employed as a bookkeeper for two years in the mid-1850s before working in a merchant business. When Louis P. Harvey, another Rock County resident, was elected Secretary of State of Wisconsin, Lawrence was hired as a clerk in his Madison office, remaining in that role through the term of his successor James T. Lewis. During those years, he was also hired as secretary for the Wisconsin State Hospital for the Insane, serving in that role from 1861 to 1870, and was appointed a trustee of that hospital from 1864 to 1870.

Returning to Janesville, he worked as a teller Rock County Bank and was briefly interested in the Janesville Mutual Life Insurance Company. In 1868, he was appointed city treasurer due to a vacancy, and was then elected continuously to remain in office until 1874. He was elected to another term on the Janesville City Council in 1877.

In 1879, he was elected to his first term in the Wisconsin State Assembly, representing Rock County's 2nd Assembly district, which then comprised just the city and town of Janesville. He was re-elected to another term in 1880.

== Personal life and family ==
Franklin Lawrence was the second of four known children of Jonathan Lawrence IV (1782–1852) and his wife Betsey (née Martin; 1793–1874). Franklin's elder brother, William A. Lawrence, served as Wisconsin state senator and became a prominent businessman in Janesville. The Lawrence family were descendants of the English colonist John Lawrence (1609–1667), an early settler at Watertown, Massachusetts.

Franklin Lawrence married Hannah Maria Fuller in March 1846; she was a daughter of Benjamin Fuller, another prominent Janesville settler and a delegate to Wisconsin's first constitutional convention. Franklin and Hannah had two children together and were married for 43 years before his wife's death in 1889. Both of their children survived them.

Franklin Lawrence died at his home Janesville on August 2, 1897.
