= Brooks, Wisconsin =

- Unincorporated community
- Location within Wisconsin Location within the United States
- Coordinates: 43°49′31″N 89°38′40″W
- Country: United States
- State: Wisconsin
- County: Adams
- Town: New Chester
- Elevation: 951 ft (290 m)
- Time zone: UTC-6 (Central (CST))
  - Summer (DST): UTC-5 (CDT)
- Area code: 608
- GNIS feature ID: 1562240

Brooks is an unincorporated community located in the town of New Chester, Adams County, Wisconsin, United States. Brooks is 5 miles (8.0 km) northwest of Oxford.

The community was originally named Brookings, but shortened its name at the Chicago and North Western Railway's request. It once had a post office, which opened in 1915.
