= 38th Wisconsin Infantry Regiment =

Union Army infantry regiment

- Flag of Wisconsin
- Active: April 15, 1864 – July 26, 1865
- Country: United States
- Allegiance: Union
- Branch: Infantry
- Size: Regiment
- Engagements: American Civil War: Siege of Petersburg; Battle of the Crater; Battle of Boydton Plank Road

Commanders
- Colonel: James Bintliff
- Lt. Colonel: Colwert K. Pier

The 38th Wisconsin Infantry Regiment was a volunteer infantry regiment that served in the Union Army during the last year of the American Civil War.

== Service ==
The 38th Wisconsin was organized at Madison, Wisconsin, and mustered into Federal service on April 15, 1864. The regiment was mustered out on July 26, 1865.

== Casualties ==
The 38th Wisconsin suffered 1 officer and 56 enlisted men killed or fatally wounded in action and 56 enlisted men who died of disease, for a total of 113 fatalities.

== Commanders ==
- Colonel James Bintliff (April 15, 1864 – June 27, 1865) mustered out. Received an honorary brevet to brigadier general.
- Lt. Colonel Colwert K. Pier (June 27, 1865 – July 26, 1865) was designated colonel after the resignation of Colonel Bintliff, but was never mustered at that rank. He was the first American child born at what is now Fond du Lac, Wisconsin, the son of Edward Pier.

== Notable people ==
- Courtland P. Larkin, the son of Charles H. Larkin, was major of the regiment.
- Solon Pierce was 1st lieutenant in Co. K. After the war he served as a Wisconsin legislator.
- Anson Rood was quartermaster for the regiment. After the war he served as a Wisconsin legislator.

== See also ==
- List of Wisconsin Civil War units
- Wisconsin in the American Civil War
