= Joseph Wood (Wisconsin politician) =

American politician

Joseph Wood (October 16, 1809 – February 5, 1890) was an American pioneer and merchant from Wisconsin Rapids, Wisconsin.

Joseph was born in Camden, New York of English ancestry. He moved west, first to Illinois, and then in 1848 to Wisconsin. He settled in what was then the new village of Grand Rapids in Portage County. He opened a store, developed land and sold lots, and later owned a hotel.

In 1856 he served a single term in the Wisconsin State Assembly. When he introduced a bill calling for creation of a new county, his fellow lawmakers named it Wood County in his honor. The city of Grand Rapids was later renamed Wisconsin Rapids after their mail was frequently misdirected to Grand Rapids, Michigan.

Wood remained active in his community, serving at various times as postmaster, county supervisor, mayor, county court judge, and director of the school board. He died at home in the county named after him.
