= Sophronius S. Landt =

American politician (1842–1926)

Sophronius Stocking Landt (November 1, 1842 – October 26, 1926) was an American politician, farmer, and teacher.

Landt was born in the town of Aztalan, Jefferson County, Wisconsin Territory. He moved with his parents to Big Spring, Wisconsin. Eventually he settled in the village of Friendship, in Adams County, Wisconsin. He served in the 10th Wisconsin Infantry Regiment during the American Civil War. He was a farmer and teacher. Landt served as the Adams County Treasurer from 1887 to 1893 and was a Republican. In 1889, Governor William D. Hoard of Wisconsin appointed Landt a delegate to the Farmer's National Congress in Birmingham, Alabama. He served in the Wisconsin State Assembly in 1895 and 1896. In 1911, Landt moved to Herman, Minnesota and managed a creamery with his son Homer. He died in Herman, Minnesota. Landt's autobiography was published based on the diary he had kept: Your Country Calls.
