= New Chester, Wisconsin =

Town of New Chester
- Town
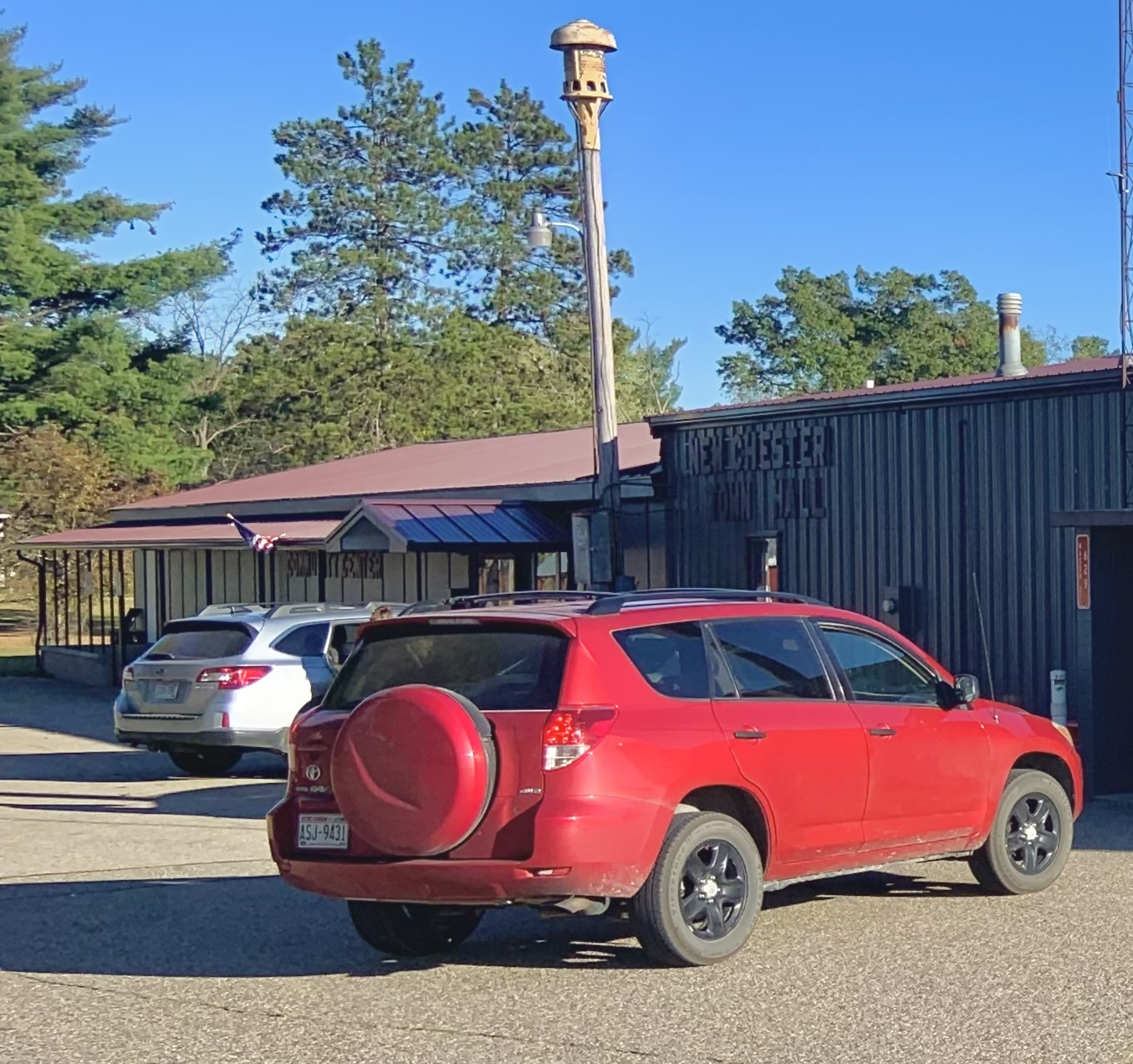
- Town hall

- Location in Adams County and the state of Wisconsin.
- Coordinates: 43°51′45″N 89°40′27″W
- Country: United States
- State: Wisconsin
- County: Adams

Area
  - Total: 31.4 sq mi (81.2 km^{2})
  - Land: 31.1 sq mi (80.5 km^{2})
  - Water: 0.27 sq mi (0.7 km^{2})
- Elevation: 1,024 ft (312 m)

Population (2020)
  - Total: 1,960
  - Density: 63.1/sq mi (24.3/km^{2})
- Time zone: UTC-6 (Central (CST))
  - Summer (DST): UTC-5 (CDT)
- Area code: 608
- FIPS code: 55-56525
- GNIS feature ID: 1583802
- Website: newchester.gov

The Town of New Chester is located in Adams County in the U.S. state of Wisconsin. The population was 2,254 at the time of the 2010 census, up from 864 at the time of the 2000 census. By the 2020 census, the population decreased to 1,960. The unincorporated communities of Brooks and Grand Marsh are located in the town. The ghost town of New Chester is also located in the town.

== Geography ==
The town of New Chester is located on the eastern border of Adams County. The community of Brooks is in the southern part of the town, and Grand Marsh is near the northwestern corner of the town. The Federal Correctional Institution, Oxford, with approximately 1,000 inmates, is located north of the geographic center of the town.

According to the United States Census Bureau, the town has a total area of 31.4 square miles (81.2 km^{2}), of which 31.1 square miles (80.5 km^{2}) is land and 0.27 square miles (0.7 km^{2}), or 0.90%, is water.

== Demographics ==
Historical population
Census	Pop.	Note	%±
1870	329		—
1880	304		−7.6%
1890	344		13.2%
1900	397		15.4%
1910	356		−10.3%
1920	625		75.6%
1930	494		−21.0%
1940	523		5.9%
1950	452		−13.6%
1960	422		−6.6%
1970	543		28.7%
1980	522		−3.9%
1990	511		−2.1%
2000	864		69.1%
2010	2,254		160.9%
2020	1,960		−13.0%
U.S. Decennial Census

As of the census of 2000, there were 864 people, 371 households, and 238 families residing in the town. The population density was 27.7 people per square mile (10.7 people/km^{2}). There were 638 housing units at an average density of 20.4 units per square mile (7.9 units/km^{2}). The racial makeup of the town was 96.76% White, 0.23% Native American, 1.39% from other races, and 1.62% from two or more races. Hispanic or Latino of any race were 2.31% of the population.

There were 371 households, out of which 24.3% had children under the age of 18 living with them, 52.3% were married couples living together, 6.2% had a female householder with no husband present, and 35.8% were non-families. 29.9% of all households were made up of individuals, and 10.2% had someone living alone who was 65 years of age or older. The average household size was 2.33 and the average family size was 2.85.

In the town, the population was spread out, with 21.6% under the age of 18, 7.3% from 18 to 24, 27.4% from 25 to 44, 25.9% from 45 to 64, and 17.7% who were 65 years of age or older. The median age was 41 years. For every 100 females, there were 110.7 males. For every 100 females age 18 and over, there were 112.9 males.

The median income for a household in the town was $28,750, and the median income for a family was $34,250. Males had a median income of $26,563 versus $23,625 for females. The per capita income for the town was $14,727. About 7.7% of families and 13.3% of the population were below the poverty line, including 23.3% of those under age 18 and 8.4% of those age 65 or over.

== Government ==
Federal Correctional Institution, Oxford is in New Chester Town.

== Education ==
It is in the Adams-Friendship Area School District.
