= Grand Marsh, Wisconsin =

Census-designated place in Wisconsin, United States

- Census-designated place
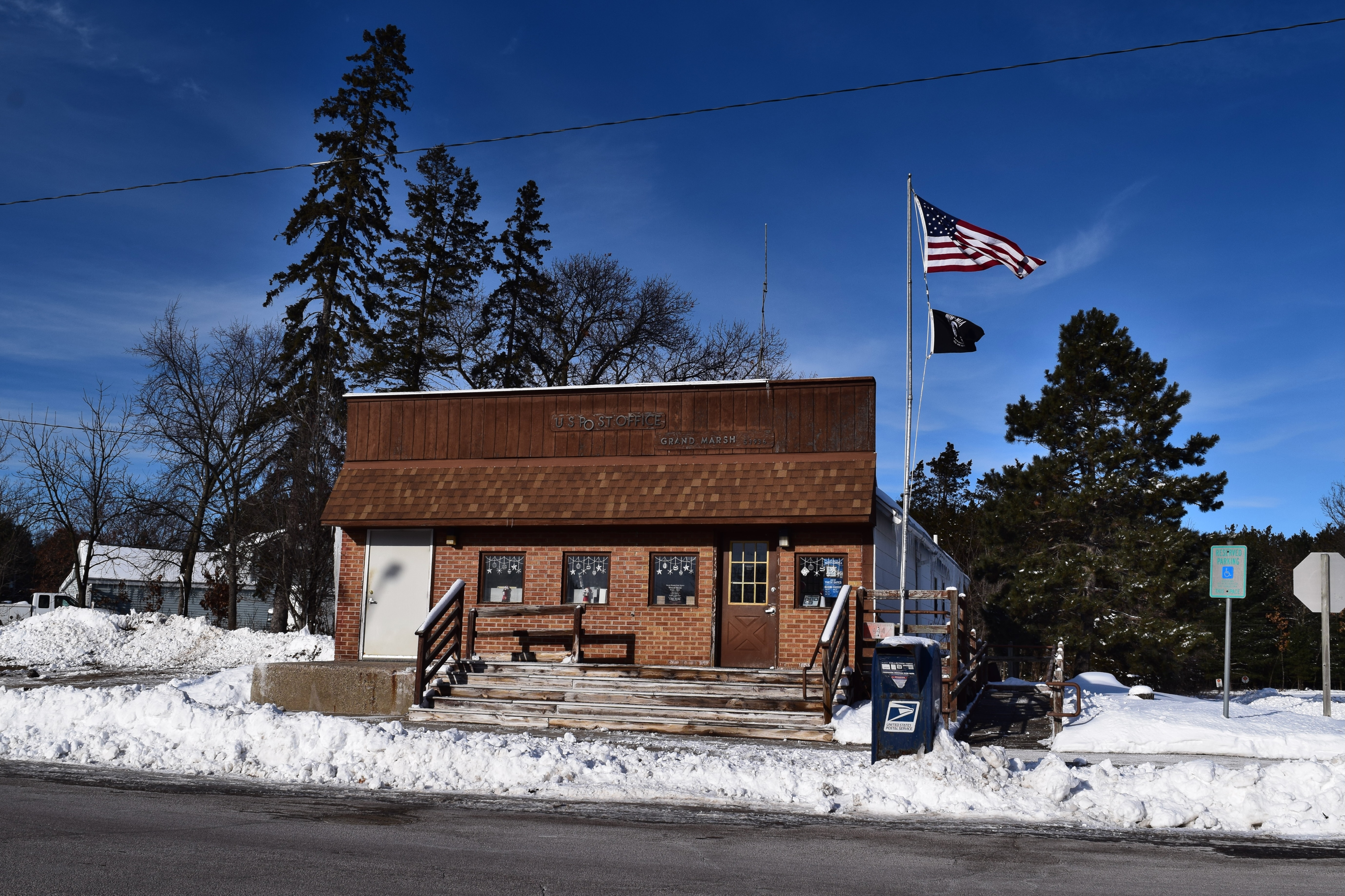
- Grand Marsh post office

- Location in Adams County and the state of Wisconsin.
- Coordinates: 43°53′13″N 89°42′22″W
- Country: United States
- State: Wisconsin
- County: Adams
- Town: New Chester

Area
  - Total: 1.209 sq mi (3.13 km^{2})
  - Land: 1.209 sq mi (3.13 km^{2})
  - Water: 0 sq mi (0 km^{2})
- Elevation: 1,010 ft (310 m)

Population (2020 census)
  - Total: 110
  - Density: 91/sq mi (35/km^{2})
- Time zone: UTC-6 (Central (CST))
  - Summer (DST): UTC-5 (CDT)
- ZIP code: 53936
- Area code: 608
- GNIS feature ID: 1565712

Grand Marsh is an unincorporated census-designated place located in Adams County, Wisconsin, United States. The community is southeast of Adams, in the town of New Chester. Grand Marsh has a post office with ZIP code 53936, which opened in 1850. As of the 2020 census, its population is 110, down from 127 at the 2010 census.

The community took its name from the surrounding wetlands.

== Education ==
It is in the Adams-Friendship Area School District.
