= Joseph Kinney Jr. =

American politician

Joseph Kinney Jr. (January 29, 1799 - May 5, 1875) was an American farmer and politician.

Born in Mount Holly, Vermont, Kinney moved to Genesee County, New York and then to Cattaraugus County, New York. In 1833, Kinney moved to Cuyahoga County, Ohio. Then in 1838, Kinney moved to Racine County, Wisconsin Territory. He then settled in Avon, Wisconsin in 1842. He served in the first Wisconsin Constitutional Convention of 1846 as a Democrat. He served in the Wisconsin State Assembly in 1851 from the town of Lima in Rock County, Wisconsin. Finally he moved to Pepin County, Wisconsin. He died at his daughter's house near Sharon, Wisconsin.
