= Delia Collins =

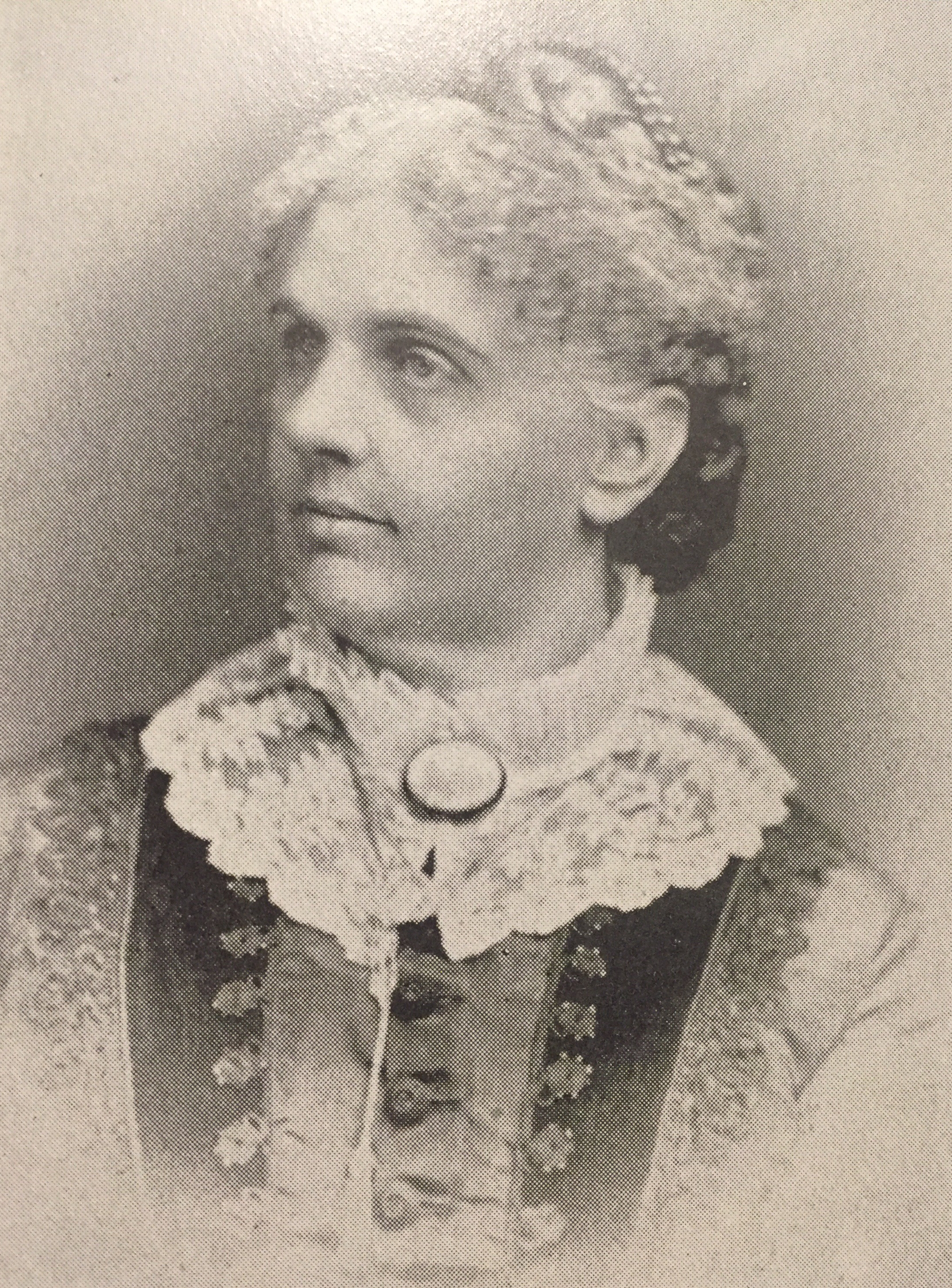
Delia Collins

Delia Krum Collins (November 25, 1830 - 1896) was an educator, philanthropist and reformer.

== Early life ==
Delia Krum was born in Franklin, Delaware County, New York, on November 25, 1830. Her mother died when she was a young woman, and her father soon afterward moved to Michigan.

At the age of fourteen years Krum entered the State Normal School in Albany, New York, and was graduated after the usual course.

== Career ==
Collins's husband founded a large business. His excessive labors brought on nervous paralysis, from which he never recovered. Collins, in the pressure of home matters, the continued and hopeless illness of her husband, opened a select school for young women, and taught French and German and English literature. Her influence among the literary societies of the city was extensive.

In 1884 Collins became interested in Bible study, Woman's Christian Temperance Union work, church and city charity, and did much in those lines. Her health became impaired, and, becoming acquainted with Carrie Judd Montgomery, of Buffalo, New York, known as the publisher of Triumphs of Faith, she accepted the doctrine of Divine Healing and was healed of a long-standing spinal trouble.

She moved to Fort Worth, Texas, with her sons in 1888. In connection with Woman's Christian Temperance Union work, she, with Kate Belle Murray Burchill, of Fort Worth, opened a bootblack's home, which finally resulted in the founding of an orphanage. A building was given for their work, and the home contained nearly seventy children. She also assisted in opening the Union Bethel Mission of Fort Worth. Its purpose was to reach the people on the street and the children. Mission Sunday-schools were founded and carried on, also nightly gospel meetings and tent gospel meetings. Her next work was the opening and founding, with other women, of a woman's home, a home for unfortunate women on the streets. She was engaged in the winter of 1891–1892 in delivering lectures throughout Texas in behalf of the home. She had the charge of the State social purity department work of the Woman's Christian Temperance Union, and was also the president of the Woman's Board of Foreign Missionary Work of the Cumberland Presbyterian Church, North Texas.

== Personal life and family ==
In 1846 Delia Krum accepted the assistant principalship of a school in Geneseo, New York, associated with Henry W. Collins (1825-1876) as principal. He was a graduate of the State Normal School. They were married in Franklinton in 1849. They moved to Elmira, New York, and Henry Collins was largely instrumental in the surveying and laying out of that city. In 1855 they moved to Janesville, Wisconsin. Henry Collins was elected superintendent of the city schools for several terms, and was connected with the founding and building up of the Institute for the Blind in Janesville. He was the first president and one of the founders of the Northwestern Mutual Life Insurance Company, of Milwaukee, Wisconsin. In 1865 he became an invalid, and was confined to the house for eleven years. It was at that time the public life of Delia Collins began.

The Collins had two sons and a daughter. Henry Collins died in 1876.

She died in 1896, in Fort Worth, Texas, and is buried at Oak Hill Cemetery, Janesville.
