= James Bintliff =

American military officer (1824–1901)

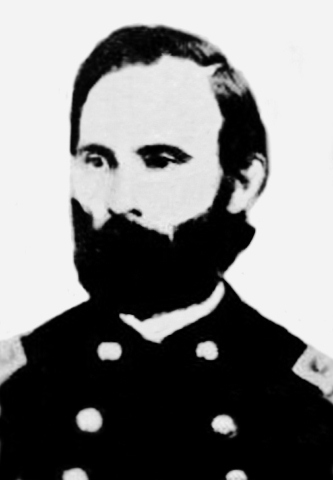
- General James Bintliff

Register of Deeds of Green County, Wisconsin
- In office January 1, 1857 – January 1, 1859
- Preceded by: Ezra Wescott
- Succeeded by: J. J. Tschudy

Personal details
- Born: November 1, 1824 Salterhebble, West Yorkshire, England, UK
- Died: March 16, 1901 (aged 76) South Chicago, Illinois, U.S.
- Resting place: Oak Hill Cemetery, Janesville, Wisconsin
- Party: Republican
- Spouse: Harriet Snook (m. 1847–1901)
- Children: Edward Hawkins Bintliff^{(b. 1849; died 1935)}; Ida (Simpson)^{(b. 1855; died 1935)}; James William Bintliff^{(b. 1857; died 1882)}; Helen (Stephens)^{(b. 1861; died 1920)}
- Relatives: Thomas Bintliff (brother)

Military service
- Allegiance: United States
- Branch/service: United States Volunteers; Union Army
- Years of service: 1862–1865
- Rank: Colonel, USV; Brevet Brig. General, USV
- Commands: 38th Reg. Wis. Vol. Infantry
- Battles/wars: American Civil War

James Bintliff (November 1, 1824 – March 16, 1901) was an American newspaper publisher, businessman, Republican politician, and Wisconsin pioneer. He served as a Union Army officer through most of the American Civil War, and received an honorary brevet to the rank of brigadier general in recognition of his conspicuous gallantry during the Third Battle of Petersburg on the final day of the Siege of Petersburg, April 2, 1865.

In civilian life, Bintliff was one of the founders of The Northwestern Mutual Life Insurance Company. He was editor, publisher and proprietor of three newspapers, the Monroe Sentinel, Janesville Gazette, and Darlington Republican. Later in life, he served nearly 20 years on the board of the state Soldiers' Orphans Home, and served several years on the state Board of Supervision of Penal and Reformatory Institutions.

== Early life ==
Bintliff was born on November 1, 1824, in Salterhebble, West Yorkshire to Gershom and Maria Hanson Bintliff. James was the third of nine children and the oldest son. In 1839 at the age of 15, he was employed as a lawyer's clerk in Halifax, West Yorkshire and later as a book-keeper for the Halifax and Wakefield Canal Company.

In 1842, accompanied by a younger brother and sister, he joined his father and mother and four other siblings in New York City. His parents had moved to New York a year earlier. According to an early biographical sketch, he "engaged in a woollen factory in New York State."

In 1847, he married Harriet Snook, the daughter of James Snook of Somerset, England, at Skaneateles, New York. James and Harriet Bintliff had four children, Edward Hawkins Bintliff, born November 15, 1849, Ida M. Bintliff, born 1855, James Wilkins Bintliff, born about 1858, and Helen Bintliff, born 1861. The birth years indicate that Edward was born in New York State and the other three children were born in Green County, Wisconsin.

Bintliff was in business with his father until 1851. In 1851, Bintliff moved to Green County, Wisconsin, where he engaged in farming. An abolitionist, Bintliff helped to found the Republican Party. After two years, he moved to Monroe, Wisconsin, where he was a bookkeeper and cashier in a bank. In 1856, he was elected Register of Deeds of Green County and served for two years. By 1857 he was identified as a newspaper editor when he became one of the founders of The Northwestern Mutual Life Insurance Company, in which he had an interest for about two years. In 1859, Bintliff was admitted to the bar of Green County.

Bintliff purchased a one-half interest in the Monroe Sentinel in 1860 and the other half in 1861. When Bintliff left the state for his Union Army service in the American Civil War, he sold a one-half interest in the Monroe Sentinel to E.E. Carr, who edited the paper for the duration of Bintliff's absence for war service.

== American Civil War service ==
On September 1, 1862, James Bintliff was commissioned as a captain in the 22nd Wisconsin Infantry Regiment of the Union Army. The unit served mainly in Kentucky and Tennessee. Detachments of the 22nd Wisconsin Infantry, which included Bintliff, were serving on garrison duty at Brentwood, Tennessee when they were attacked by a superior force led by Confederate Major General Nathan Bedford Forrest. In the Battle of Brentwood, on May 25, 1863, Forrest captured most of the garrison. Bintliff was captured and taken to Libby Prison in Richmond, Virginia, as a prisoner of war. He was released and exchanged in May and rejoined his regiment, which was being reorganized at St. Louis, Missouri. He resigned his commission on December 27, 1863. At that time, President Lincoln appointed Bintliff as Commissioner on the Board of Enrollment for the Third Congressional District of Wisconsin.

On April 27, 1864, Bintliff was appointed Colonel of the 38th Wisconsin Volunteer Infantry Regiment. He commanded Brigade 1, Division 1, IX Corps, Army of the Potomac between November 28, 1864, and December 17, 1864 while Brigadier General John Hartranft was in command of the division. He commanded Brigade 3, Division 1, IX Corps, Army of the Potomac, between April 2, 1865, and April 24, 1865. The IX Corps took a prominent part in the storming of Petersburg on April 2, 1865, which resulted in the evacuation of the Confederate capital of Richmond, Virginia, the surrender of the Army of Northern Virginia at Appomattox Court House on April 9, 1865, and the swift end of the war and dissolution of the Confederacy. During the Third Battle of Petersburg, on April 2, 1865, Colonel Bintliff, in command of his regiment and two others, was ordered to take a fort of five guns, known as "Reeves' Salient," which he and his men accomplished.

Bintliff was mustered out of the volunteers on June 26, 1865. Soon thereafter, Bintliff was recognized for his success in commanding his regiment and two others during the Siege of Petersburg, especially for his conspicuous gallantry on April 2, 1865, during the Third Battle of Petersburg when the city fell to the Union Army. On January 13, 1866, President Andrew Johnson nominated Bintliff for appointment to the grade of brevet brigadier general of volunteers, to rank from April 2, 1865, and the U.S. Senate confirmed the appointment on March 12, 1866.

Bintliff's brother Gersham, served as a private in the 38th Wisconsin Infantry Regiment, of which James was colonel. His brother Thomas was a lieutenant in the 20th Wisconsin Volunteer Infantry Regiment and his youngest brother, Alfred, was a musician in the 5th Independent Battery Wisconsin Light Artillery.

== Later life ==
After he returned from the war, Bintliff sold his one-half interest in the Monroe Sentinel and considered moving to Missouri. He found the area to be in turmoil and "did not deem it wise to remove any family there." He then bought a book, stationery and wallpaper business which he ran until 1870. In 1868, 1872 and 1876, Bintliff was a delegate to the Republican National Conventions at Chicago, Philadelphia and Cincinnati.

In 1870, Bintliff purchased a one-half interest in the Janesville Gazette at Janesville, Wisconsin, and became its editor until December 1877.

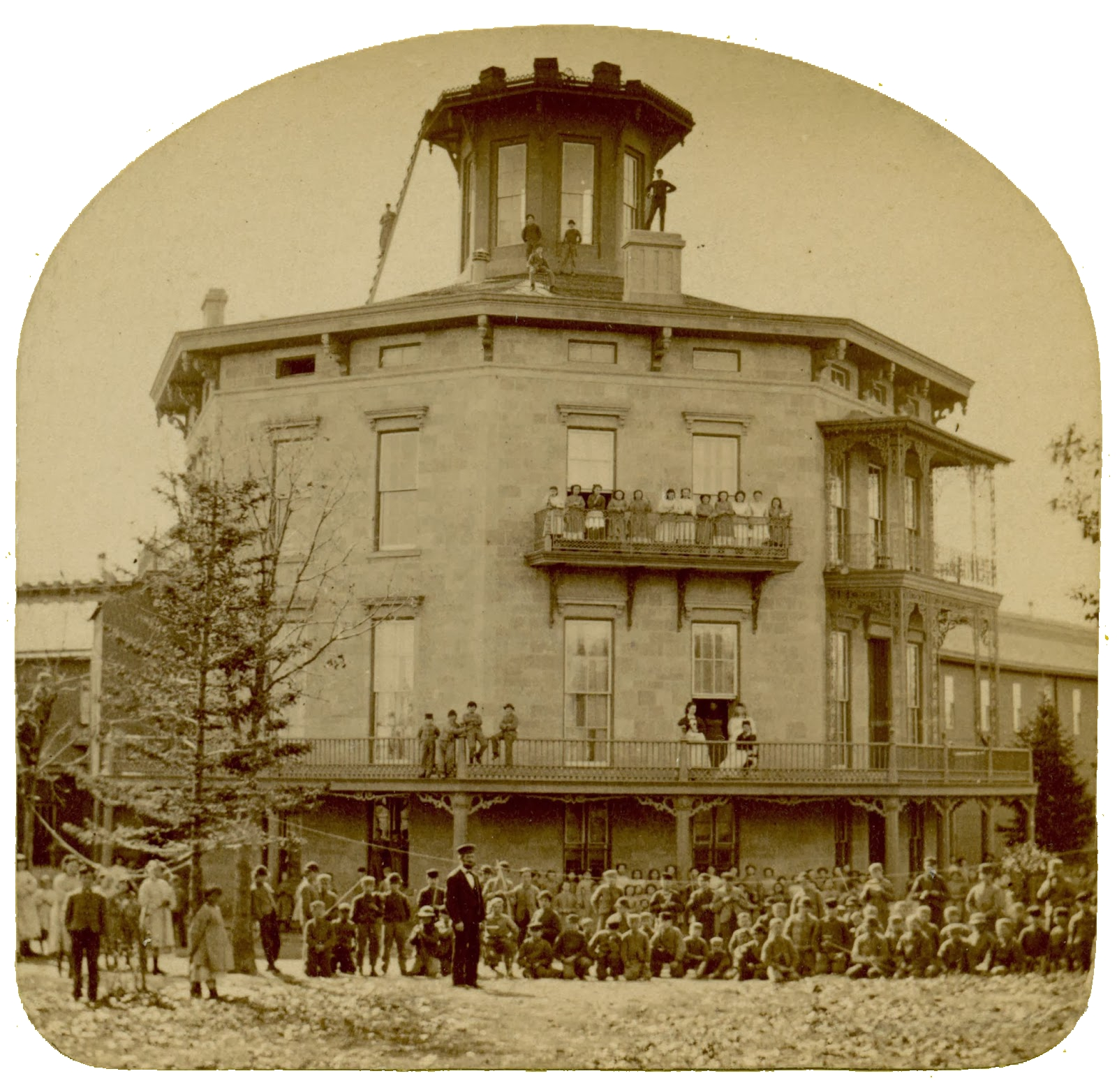
Wisconsin soldiers orphans home 1870s

Between 1870 and 1877, he also was a member of the board of trustees, and for two years president of the board, of the Wisconsin Soldiers' Orphans' home. In early 1878, Bintliff and R. L. Colvin sold their interests in the Janesville Gazette. In April 1878, Bintliff bought a one-half interest in the Darlington Republican at Darlington, Wisconsin, and became its editor and publisher. The other one-half interest was bought by his son, Edward H. Bintliff. Later in 1878, James Bintliff was a founder of the Darlington Literary Club which was established for the purpose of studying, presenting papers on and conversing about English literature. Bintliff prepared the list of the first twelve studies ranging from Chaucer to Addison and Steele. In April 1883, James Bintliff sold his one-half interest in the Darlington Republican to J. G. Monahan. Two years later, Monahan had bought the interest of Edward Bintliff and was running the paper as sole proprietor.

In 1876, Wisconsin established the State Board of Health of the State of Wisconsin. Bintliff was chosen as a member of the Board for four years, ending January 31, 1880. He was the only one of the seven members who was not a doctor. From 1881 to 1891, Bintliff served on the State Board of Supervision of Wisconsin Charitable, Reformatory and Penal Institutions, which was renamed the State Board of Control of Wisconsin Charitable, Reformatory and Penal Institutions in 1891.

A brief sketch of his life by the Wisconsin Historical Society states that Bintliff retired to private life to spend time with his family and his studies after his term on the Board of Supervision expired. His home was in Darlington, Wisconsin until 1895 when he moved "to Chicago." In the first edition of a book published just before Bintliff's death, the author stated about Bintliff: "It is with much regret that I learn that he is nearly blind and past work at his home in Chicago. (1900.)" Bintliff died of a stroke on March 16, 1901, in South Chicago, Cook County, Illinois. James Bintliff was buried in Oak Hill Cemetery, Janesville, Wisconsin.

Bintliff's former home in Monroe, Wisconsin, now known as the Gen. James Bintliff House, is on the National Register of Historic Places.
