= Barbara A. Bintliff =

American lawyer and professor (born 1953)

- Education: University of Washington
- Occupations: Lawyer and Professor

Barbara A. Bintliff (born 1953) was the Joseph C. Hutcheson Professor and Director of the Tarlton Law Library/Jamail Center for Legal Research at University of Texas School of Law, and was previously the Nicholas Rosenbaum Professor of Law and Director of the William A. Wise Law Library at University of Colorado.

== Career ==
Bintliff earned a degree in law librarianship at the University of Washington Information School in 1979 and also holds a law degree from the University of Washington. She began her career as a reference librarian and technical services coordinator at the University of Denver's Westminster Law Library from 1979 to 1984, and then worked at the University of Colorado Law School Library as an instructor and assistant librarian from 1984, as associate director from 1986, and as its director from 1989. At Colorado she received the university's highest honor, the Robert L. Stearns Award, in 2008, for achievements in teaching, research and service.

In 2010 she became director of the Tarlton Law Library and Jamail Center for Legal Research and the Joseph C. Hutcheson Professor in Law at the University of Texas School of Law, serving until 2021. The law school described her as a former president of the American Association of Law Libraries (AALL) who had also led the Southwestern Association of Law Libraries and the Colorado Association of Law Libraries. She became Joseph C. Hutcheson Professor Emeritus in Law in February 2022.

== Research and writing ==
Bintliff's research interests include the authentication of legal materials and the differences between print and electronic legal research and the ways in which they yield divergent results. She co-authored with Steven M. Barkan and Mary Whisner Fundamentals of Legal Research and Legal Research Illustrated (both 10th ed., Foundation Press, 2015). She also contributed to the Boulder Statement on Legal Research Education, an effort among legal-research educators to define the competencies law graduates should have.

== Honors ==
In 2022 the American Association of Law Libraries awarded Bintliff its Marian Gould Gallagher Distinguished Service Award, which recognizes exceptional service to the association and to law librarianship. The citation noted her service as a past president of AALL, and described her as a scholar, teacher, leader and mentor.
