= A. Hyatt Smith =

American lawyer and politician (1814–1892)

1st and 5th Mayor of Janesville, Wisconsin
- In office April 1857 – April 1858
- Preceded by: John J. R. Pease
- Succeeded by: William A. Lawrence
- In office April 1853 – April 1854
- Preceded by: Position established
- Succeeded by: J. Bodwell Doe

United States Attorney for the District of Wisconsin
- In office 1848–1849
- Appointed by: James K. Polk
- Preceded by: Thomas W. Sutherland
- Succeeded by: George W. Lakin

5th Attorney General of the Wisconsin Territory
- In office January 22, 1846 – June 7, 1848
- Appointed by: Henry Dodge
- Preceded by: William Pitt Lynde
- Succeeded by: James S. Brown (state government)

Personal details
- Born: Abraham Hyatt Smith; February 5, 1814 New York City, US
- Died: October 16, 1892 (aged 78) Janesville, Wisconsin, US
- Resting place: Oak Hill Cemetery; Janesville, Wisconsin
- Party: Democratic
- Spouse: Ann Margaret Cooper (Kelley) (m. 1838; died 1885)
- Children: Minnie C. Smith; (b. 1841; died 1913); William Hyatt Smith; (b. 1842; died 1843); Fanny F. Smith; (b. 1842; died 1843); J. Maurice Smith; (b. 1845; died 1926); Anna Kate (Patterson); (b. 1853; died 1914)
- Profession: lawyer, politician

Abraham Hyatt Smith (February 5, 1814 – October 16, 1892) was an American lawyer, Democratic politician, and Wisconsin pioneer. He was the 5th Attorney General of the Wisconsin Territory, the 2nd United States Attorney for the District of Wisconsin, and the first mayor of Janesville, Wisconsin. In historical documents his name is almost always abbreviated as A. Hyatt Smith.

== Biography ==
Born in New York City, Smith studied law and was admitted to the New York bar in 1835. In 1842, he moved to Janesville, Wisconsin Territory, where he built a mill and practiced law. Smith served as a delegate to the first Wisconsin Constitutional Convention of 1846 as a representative of Rock County. In 1847, Wisconsin Territorial Governor Henry Dodge appointed Smith as the Attorney General of the Territory serving until Wisconsin became a state in 1848. In 1848, President James Polk appointed Smith as the United States District Attorney serving until 1849. In 1853, Smith was elected first Mayor of Janesville after its incorporation as a city. He later served as Mayor again in 1857. He was also involved with the railroad industry and other forms of communication. For some years, he was Regent for the University of Wisconsin at Madison.

Political offices
City incorporated	Mayor of Janesville, Wisconsin; April 1853 – April 1854	Succeeded by J. Bodwell Doe
Preceded by John J. R. Pease	Mayor of Janesville, Wisconsin; April 1857 – April 1858	Succeeded by William A. Lawrence
Legal offices
Preceded by William Pitt Lynde	Attorney General of the Wisconsin Territory; January 22, 1846 – June 7, 1848	Succeeded by James S. Brown (state government)
Preceded by Thomas W. Sutherland	United States Attorney for the District of Wisconsin; 1848–1849	Succeeded by George W. Lakin
