= G. M. Marshall =

American politician

George McContyre Marshall (13 May 1834 – 27 February 1915) was a member of the Wisconsin State Assembly.

== Biography ==
Marshall was born in Lower Canada. His father was a cousin of Rufus Choate, a member of the United States House of Representatives and the United States Senate. Marshall married Julia A. Hoyt (1834–1900). They had seven children. He and his son Frank founded a machining business in what is now Wisconsin Dells, Wisconsin. He died of pneumonia in 1915.

== Political career ==
Marshall was a member of the Assembly during the 1875 and 1876 sessions. Additionally, he was a town chairman (similar to mayor). He was a Republican.
