= George Allen Neeves =

American politician

George Allen Neeves was an American politician. He was a member of the Wisconsin State Assembly.

== Biography ==
Neeves was born in Cambridge, Illinois on January 3, 1842. Later, he resided in what was once Grand Rapids, Wisconsin and attended Lawrence University. Reports have differed on the exact date of his death.

== Career ==
Neeves was a member of the Assembly during the 1872 session. Elected as an independent, he became a Republican.
