= Samuel Tanner =

American politician

Samuel Tanner (May 1, 1842 in Crawford County, Pennsylvania – ?), he moved to Westfield, Marquette County, Wisconsin in 1854. He was a member of the Wisconsin State Assembly.

== Career ==
Tanner was a member of the Assembly in 1882 and 1883. Previously, he was Town Clerk of Westfield in 1871. He was a Democrat.
