= Great Blue Norther of November 11, 1911 =

1911 severe weather event in the Central United States

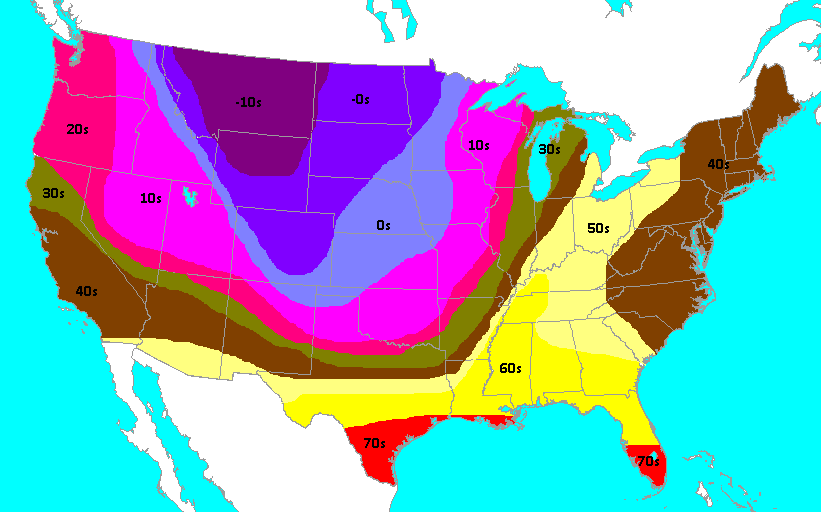
- Low temperatures recorded at midnight EST (05:00 UTC) on November 12, 1911

Tornado outbreak
- Tornadoes: 13+
- Max. rating: F4 tornado
- Highest winds: 50–70 mph (80–113 km/h)

Overall effects
- Fatalities: 57
- Injuries: 205
- Damage: $1.755 million (tornado outbreak only) (Note: All losses are in 1911 USD unless otherwise noted.)
- Areas affected: Upper Midwest

On Saturday, November 11, 1911, a cold snap, known as the Great Blue Norther or 11/11/11, affected the Central United States. Many cities broke record highs, going into the 70s and 80s early that afternoon. By nightfall, cities were dealing with temperatures in the teens and single-digits on the Fahrenheit scale. This is the only day in many midwest cities' weather bureau jurisdictions where the record highs and lows were broken for the same day. Some cities experienced tornadoes on Saturday and a blizzard on Sunday. A blizzard even occurred within one hour after an F4 tornado hit Rock County, Wisconsin.

The front produced severe weather and tornadoes across the upper Mississippi Valley and a blizzard in Ohio; the windy conditions upon front passage caused a dust storm in Oklahoma. Alongside the dramatic temperature swings, the cold front brought a destructive tornado outbreak to parts of the Midwest. At least 13 tornadoes touched down across five states as the system moved through, resulting in 13 fatalities. Hundreds of structures were destroyed by the storms and many areas had to conduct search and rescue missions amidst blizzard conditions. Thomas P. Grazulis stated in 1990 that this outbreak was one of the worst on record in November for the north-central States.

== Background ==
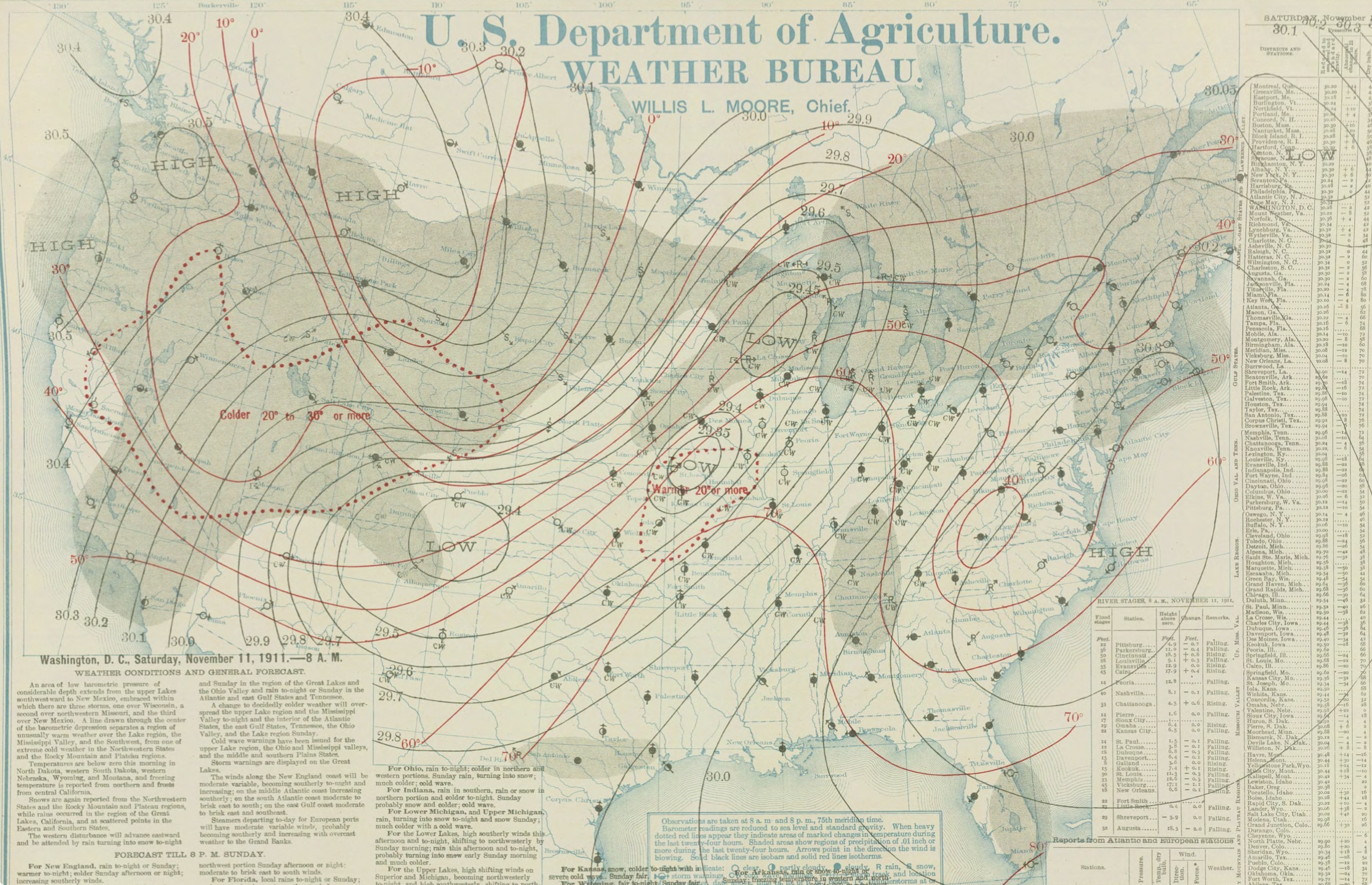
Weather map on November 11, that shows the low-pressure area that produced very cold temperatures, and the tornado outbreak

The main cause of such a dramatic cold snap was an extremely strong storm system separating warm, humid air from frigid, arctic air. Dramatic cold snaps tend to occur mostly in the month of November, though they can also come in February or March. These arrivals of Continental Polar or Arctic air masses are generally called northers, and the one in question was marked by a mass of steel blue clouds in the vicinity of the surface front, hence the name. Although temperature drops of this extent have happened on other occasions, as recently as February 2009, the fact that the 1911 cold front passage was during the autumn and came after such warm weather contributed to the properties mentioned in this article.

== Impact ==
The cold front was so strong that while several states saw record monthly highs on November 10 and 11, they saw record cold monthly lows on November 12 and 13. This was especially true in Missouri, where one station had a high of 93 °F (34 °C) before the storm, and after the storm, another station had a low of −3 °F (−19 °C). The cold front began on November 9. Rapid City, South Dakota, went from 55 °F (13 °C) at 6am to 3 °F (−16 °C) at 8am. Between November 10 and 11, Denver experienced its eleventh largest two-day temperature swing, from 66 to −2 °F (19 to −19 °C), a 68 °F (38 °C) change.

On November 11, temperatures in Kansas City, Missouri, had reached a record high of 76 °F (24 °C) by late morning before the front moved through. As the cold front approached, the winds increased, turning from southeast to northwest. By midnight, the temperature had dropped to 11 °F (−12 °C), a 65 °F (36 °C) difference in 14 hours. The next day would have a record low of 6 °F (−14 °C) and a high of only 21 °F (−6 °C). In Springfield, the temperature difference was even more extreme. Springfield was at 80 °F (27 °C) at about 3:45 p.m. CST (21:45 UTC), before the cold front moved through. Fifteen minutes later, the temperature was 40 °F (4 °C) with winds out of the northwest at 40 mph (64 km/h). By 7:00 p.m. CST (01:00 UTC) on November 12, the temperature had dropped a further 20 °F (−7 °C), and by midnight (06:00 UTC), a record low of 13 °F (−11 °C) was established. It was the first time since records had been kept for Springfield that the record high and record low were broken in the same day. The freak temperature difference was also a record breaker: 67 °F (37 °C) in 10 hours. Peak wind gusts reached 74 miles per hour (119 km/h). The low on the morning of November 12 was 9 °F (−13 °C). St. Louis dropped from 74 to 49 °F (23 to 9 °C) in just ten minutes. Record highs and lows were established on the same day in Oklahoma City as well, with a high of 83 °F (28 °C) and low of 17 °F (−8 °C); temperature difference: 66 °F (37 °C). Both records still hold. The temperate dropped further to a record low of 14 °F (−10 °C) on November 12, before gradually warming, as Oklahoma City hit 68 °F (20 °C) on November 13 and 74 °F (23 °C) on November 14. It also produced a dust storm. Tulsa, Oklahoma, had an even more dramatic plunge from 85 °F (29 °C) in the afternoon of November 11 to 15 °F (−9 °C) by the morning of November 12, although the temperature at midnight is not known. Independence, Kansas, saw the temperature drop 50 °F (28 °C) from 83 to 33 °F (28 to 1 °C) in one hour. In Denton, Texas, the temperature drop wasn't as immediate, dropping from 85 °F (29 °C) at 5pm to 68 °F (20 °C) by 6pm, but the low the morning of November 12 was still 22 °F (−6 °C). While this wasn't Amarillo's biggest temperature drop, the drop from 70 to 13 °F (21 to −11 °C) is still an impressive 57 °F (32 °C) drop. Nearby Dallas also saw an impressive plunge from 85 to 39 °F (29 to 4 °C) by midnight and by the next morning the mercury was 21 °F (−6 °C). In Chicago, Illinois, people died separately of heatstroke and cold, respectively, within 24 hours, the first such incidence on record in the city. The temperature dropped from 74 to 13 °F (23 to −11 °C) during the event. Across central Illinois, up to 1 inch (2.5 cm) of snow fell, and in Peoria, Illinois, after a high of 77 °F (25 °C) on November 11, the temperature crashed to 17 °F (−8 °C) by midnight, and the high on November 12 was 18 °F (−8 °C). While only the southern and eastern parts of Iowa felt the Norther, the impacts there were nonetheless powerful, as Albia, Iowa, fell from 72 to 5 °F (22 to −15 °C) in twelve hours.

The front did not reach Columbus, Ohio, until 3:00 a.m. on November 12, but when it did, temperatures plummeted from 70 °F (21 °C), just a degree from a record high, to 49 °F (9 °C) in an hour, and down to 16 °F (−9 °C) - a record low - that night. By November 13, temperatures dipped further to 14 °F (−10 °C). Lexington, Kentucky, also saw the temperature drop on the 12th, when it went from nearly 70 °F (21 °C) down to a record low of 14 °F (−10 °C). It dipped to another record low of 13 °F (−11 °C) on November 13, and a record cold high of 28 °F (−2 °C) was also established. However, the record low for November 13 was broken in 2019. Bowling Green, Kentucky, saw the drop across the entire day on November 12, from 75 to 22 °F (24 to −6 °C). Temperature plunges ranged from 42 to 54 °F (23 to 30 °C) on the East Coast.

=== Tornadoes ===
On Saturday, November 11, 1911, a regionally and seasonally significant tornado outbreak affected the Great Lakes region of the United States. (Note: The Fujita scale was devised under the aegis of scientist T. Theodore Fujita in the early 1970s. Prior to the advent of the scale in 1971, tornadoes in the United States were officially unrated. While the Fujita scale has been superseded by the Enhanced Fujita scale in the U.S. since February 1, 2007, Canada utilized the old scale until April 1, 2013; nations elsewhere, like the United Kingdom, apply other classifications such as the TORRO scale.) (Note: Historically, the number of tornadoes globally and in the United States was and is likely underrepresented: research by Grazulis on annual tornado activity suggests that, as of 2001, only 53% of yearly U.S. tornadoes were officially recorded. Documentation of tornadoes outside the United States was historically less exhaustive, owing to the lack of monitors in many nations and, in some cases, to internal political controls on public information. Most countries only recorded tornadoes that produced severe damage or loss of life. Significant low biases in U.S. tornado counts likely occurred through the early 1990s, when advanced NEXRAD was first installed and the National Weather Service began comprehensively verifying tornado occurrences.) The outbreak generated at least 13 tornadoes, including a violent, long-tracked F4 that impacted Wisconsin, killing at least nine people and injuring 50 more. Other intense tornadoes occurred in Illinois and Indiana, resulting in four additional fatalities. Several other tornadoes were reported from multiple states. In all, the outbreak killed 16 people and injured at least 101. Total losses exceeded $1.755 million (1911 USD). Tornado researcher Thomas P. Grazulis considered the outbreak to be the worst in the month of November on record at the time in the Great Lakes region.

Some cities experienced tornadoes on Saturday and a blizzard on Sunday. The passage of a cold front, marked by strong winds, produced severe weather, including tornadoes, across the upper Mississippi River Valley, a blizzard in Ohio, and a dust storm in Oklahoma.

==== Confirmed tornadoes ====
Confirmed tornadoes by Fujita rating
FU	F0	F1	F2	F3	F4	F5	Total
4+	?	?	6	2	1	0	13+*

- A possible tornado caused extensive damage in Bedford, Lawrence County, Indiana, with losses reaching $500,000. Another possible tornado killed horses and cattle near Kingsland in Eaton County, Michigan. At least three other tornadoes may have affected Green, Dane, and Walworth counties, respectively, in the state of Wisconsin.

Confirmed tornadoes – Saturday, November 11, 1911 (Note: All dates are based on the local time zone where the tornado touched down; however, all times are in Coordinated Universal Time and dates are split at midnight CST/CDT for consistency.) (Note: Prior to 1994, only the average widths of tornado paths were officially listed.)
F#	Location	County / Parish	State	Time (UTC)	Path length	Max. width	Summary
F2	W of Davenport	Scott	IA	18:55–?	9 miles (14 km)	20 yards (18 m)	The first known tornado of the outbreak touched down 1 mi (1.6 km) west of Davenport and tracked northeast. Along its path, five farms sustained damage and a barn was destroyed. One person was injured by the tornado.
F4	Avon to Lima	Rock	WI	20:00–?	35 miles (56 km)	400 yards (370 m)	12 deaths – The most powerful tornado of the outbreak caused extensive damage to Rock County, Wisconsin. Beginning at 2:00 p.m. CST, the tornado tracked north-northeastward past Orfordville, passed through Hanover, skirted the northwest edge of Janesville, struck Milton, and dissipated in Lima. The worst damage occurred near Milton. Several farms were also leveled near Milton. Overall losses from the tornado reached $1,000,000. Blizzard conditions ensued within an hour of the tornado's passage. Estimates of the death toll vary, with one publication listing nine deaths. 50 people were injured along the path.
F2	Arenzville to Virginia	Cass	IL	22:00–?	18 miles (29 km)	100 yards (91 m)	Tornado touched down near Arenzville and tracked northeast into the town of Virginia. There, about 100 structures were damaged or destroyed. The worst damage occurred on the west side of town where 30 homes and businesses, including a church and high school, were destroyed. Overall, 12 people were injured by the tornado and losses reached $150,000.
F3	S of Easton	Mason	IL	22:45–?	11 miles (18 km)	Unknown	2 deaths – A strong tornado touched down south of Easton and destroyed several homes. Two people were killed in separate incidents near the town. Nine other people were injured by the tornado and losses reached $20,000.
F2	E of Aurora	DuPage	IL	23:30–?	4 miles (6.4 km)	Unknown	A tornado touched down east of Aurora and damaged several buildings. One home lost its roof and another was struck by debris from a barn. The tornado was last noted moving into the "big woods" northeast of Aurora. Losses from the storm reached $10,000.
F3	Leroy to S of Michigan City	Lake, Porter	IN	01:00–?	30 miles (48 km)	150 yards (140 m)	A strong, long-lived tornado first touched down near Leroy and tracked northeast to Michigan City. The most significant damage took place near Lake Eliza where a school was destroyed. Debris from the building was tossed up to 2 mi (3.2 km) away. Another school in Jackson Township was also destroyed. Along the tornado's path, buildings were destroyed on 15 farms. One person was picked up and tossed to his neighbor's house by the storm. According to Thomas P. Grazulis, this tornado was likely a tornado family and not a single, continuous event. Five injuries occurred along the path.
FU	Terre Haute	Vigo	IN	02:10–?	≥0.5 miles (0.80 km)	Unknown	Apparent tornado struck Terre Haute and injured three people. Touching down in the heart of the town, the tornado soon struck a grocery store, blowing out lights and windows. Several barns along the tornado's path were completely destroyed or flattened. One home in the city was flattened and swept clean off its foundation, leaving just an underground cellar behind. The second floor of the John Rankin School was destroyed. The caboose of a train in the town was thrown off the tracks, injuring the occupants.
F2	Waterloo	DeKalb	IN	03:00–?	5 miles (8.0 km)	70 yards (64 m)	A significant tornado struck the town of Waterloo, damaging or destroying at least 100 structures. An opera house in Waterloo collapsed due to the tornado. Just outside town, several farms were also severely damaged. Losses from the storm reached $75,000.
F2	SE of Battle Creek	Calhoun	MI	03:00–?	Unknown	Unknown	Tornado touched down well to the southeast of Battle Creek. Several barns were leveled and homes were damaged.
F2	Laingsburg to Owosso	Shiawassee	MI	04:05–?	12 miles (19 km)	100 yards (91 m)	2 deaths – Extensive damage took place in Owosso. Five factories and twenty homes were destroyed. Two people were killed when the upper floor of their home collapsed on them. 21 people were injured throughout the town. Just outside Laingsburg, 15 barns were destroyed by the tornado. Overall losses from the storm reached $500,000.
FU	Unknown	Kankakee	IL	Unknown	Unknown	Unknown	A study in 1993 chronicling all tornadoes in Illinois prior to 1916 revealed that a tornado touched down in Kankakee County.
FU	Unknown	Cumberland	IL	Unknown	Unknown	Unknown	A study in 1993 chronicling all tornadoes in Illinois prior to 1916 revealed that a tornado touched down in Cumberland County.
FU	Genesee to Lisbon	Waukesha	WI	Unknown	Unknown	Unknown	Homes, barns, chicken coops, sheds, and various outbuildings were unroofed or blown off their foundations.

== See also ==
- List of tornadoes and tornado outbreaks
  - List of North American tornadoes and tornado outbreaks
- Twosday
- Tornado outbreak of November 17, 2013 – Deadliest and costliest November outbreak on record in Illinois and the largest for that month on record in Indiana

== Sources ==
- Brooks, Harold E. (April 2004). "On the Relationship of Tornado Path Length and Width to Intensity". Weather and Forecasting. 19 (2). Boston: American Meteorological Society: 310. Bibcode:2004WtFor..19..310B. doi:10.1175/1520-0434(2004)019<0310:OTROTP>2.0.CO;2.
- Cook, A. R.; Schaefer, J. T. (August 2008). Written at Norman, Oklahoma. "The Relation of El Niño–Southern Oscillation (ENSO) to Winter Tornado Outbreaks". Monthly Weather Review. 136 (8). Boston: American Meteorological Society: 3135. Bibcode:2008MWRv..136.3121C. doi:10.1175/2007MWR2171.1.
- Grazulis, Thomas P. (November 1990). Significant Tornadoes 1880–1989. Vol. 2. St. Johnsbury, Vermont: The Tornado Project of Environmental Films. ISBN 1-879362-02-3.
- Grazulis, Thomas P. (July 1993). Significant Tornadoes 1680–1991: A Chronology and Analysis of Events. St. Johnsbury, Vermont: The Tornado Project of Environmental Films. ISBN 1-879362-03-1.
- Grazulis, Thomas P. (2001a). The Tornado: Nature's Ultimate Windstorm. Norman, Oklahoma: University of Oklahoma Press. ISBN 978-0-8061-3538-0.
- Grazulis, Thomas P. (2001b). F5-F6 Tornadoes. St. Johnsbury, Vermont: The Tornado Project of Environmental Films.
- Wayne M. Wendland and Herbert Hoffman (1993). "Illinois Tornadoes Prior to 1916" (PDF). Transactions of the Illinois State Academy of Science. 86 (1). Archived from the original (PDF) on October 8, 2011.
