= Wisconsin's 17th Senate district =

American legislative district in southwest Wisconsin

Wisconsin's 17th State Senate district
- 2024 map defined in 2023 Wisc. Act 94; 2022 map defined in Johnson v. Wisconsin Elections Commission; 2011 map was defined in 2011 Wisc. Act 43 composed of Assembly districts 49, 50, and 51
Senator
Howard Marklein; R–Spring Green
since January 3, 2015 (11 years, 319 days)
- Demographics: 93.51% White; 1.19% Black; 2.54% Hispanic; 0.9% Asian; 1.22% Native American; 0.08% Hawaiian/Pacific Islander
- Population (2020) • Voting age: 178,093; 137,984
- Website: Official website
- Notes: Southwest Wisconsin

Wisconsin's 17th Senate district is one of 33 districts in the Wisconsin Senate. Located in southwest Wisconsin, the district comprises all of Crawford, Grant, Green, Lafayette, and Iowa counties, as well as parts of southwest Dane County, western Rock County, and southern Vernon County. It includes the cities of Boscobel, Brodhead, Cuba City, Darlington, Dodgeville, Lancaster, Mineral Point, Monroe, Oregon, Platteville, Prairie du Chien, and Shullsburg.

== Current elected officials ==
Howard Marklein is the senator representing the 17th district. He was first elected in the 2014 general election. Before serving as senator, he was a member of the Wisconsin State Assembly from 2011 to 2015, representing the 51st Assembly district. After the 2024 redistricting, Marklein no longer resides in the new district.

Each Wisconsin State Senate district is composed of three Wisconsin State Assembly districts. The 17th Senate district comprises the 49th, 50th, and 51st Assembly districts. The current representatives of those districts are:

- Assembly District 49: Travis Tranel (R–Cuba City)
- Assembly District 50: Jenna Jacobson (D–Oregon)
- Assembly District 51: Todd Novak (R–Dodgeville)

The 17th Senate district crosses two congressional districts. The portion of the district in Iowa, Lafayette, Green, and Dane counties fall within Wisconsin's 2nd congressional district, which is represented by Mark Pocan. The remainder of the district, in Grant and Crawford County, falls within Wisconsin's 3rd congressional district, represented by Derrick Van Orden.

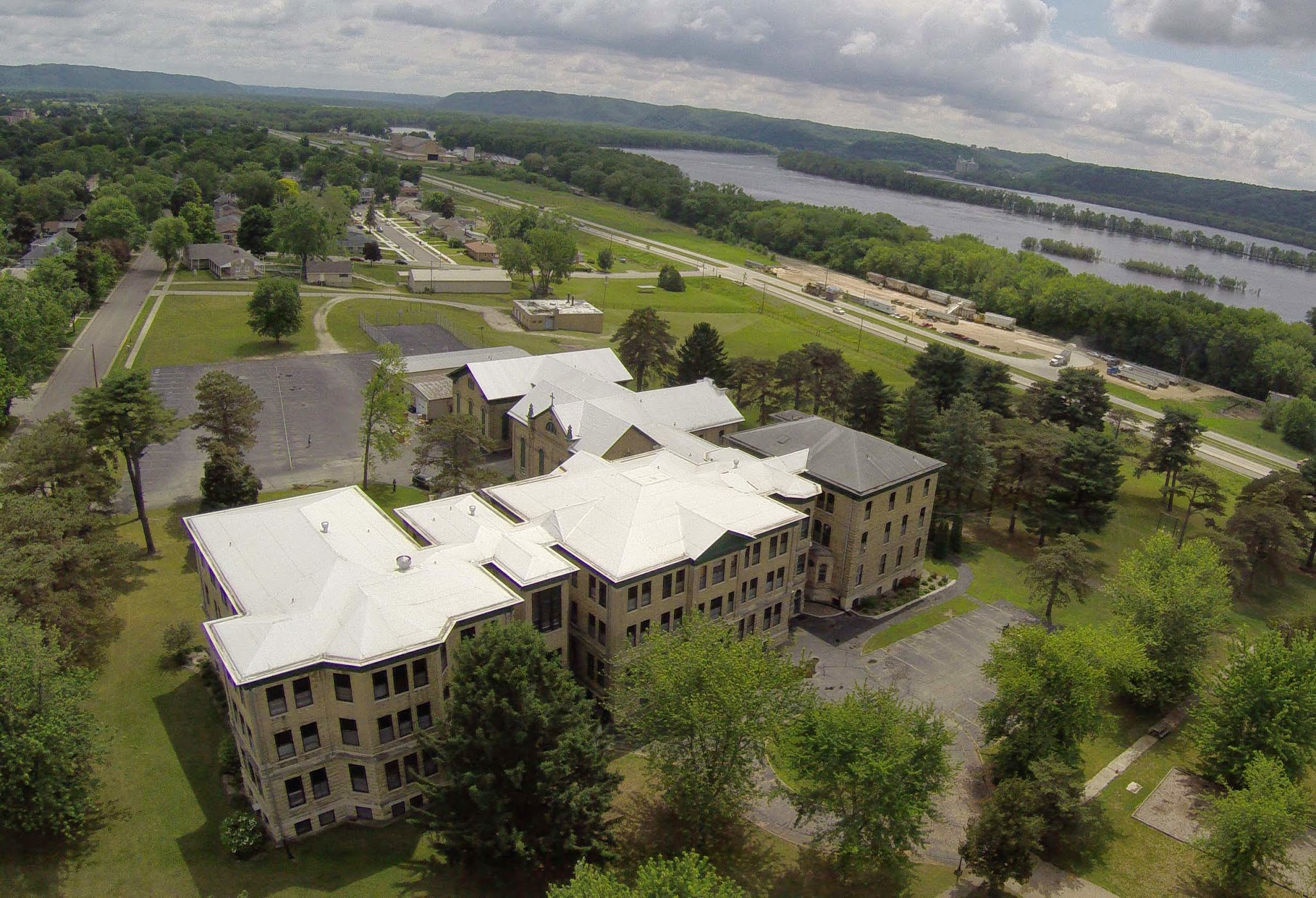
Wyalusing Academy, in Prairie du Chien, with the Mississippi River in the background

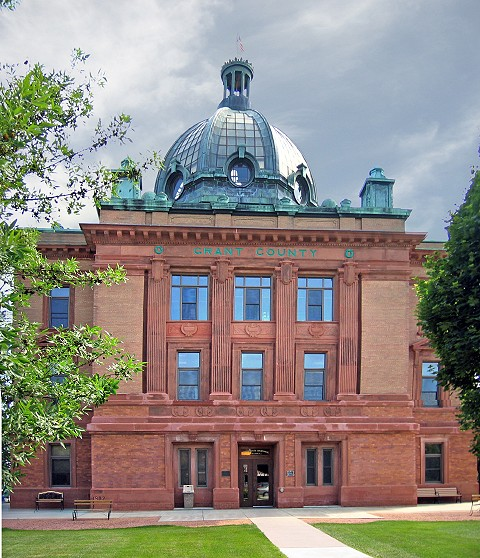
Historic Grant County Courthouse in Lancaster

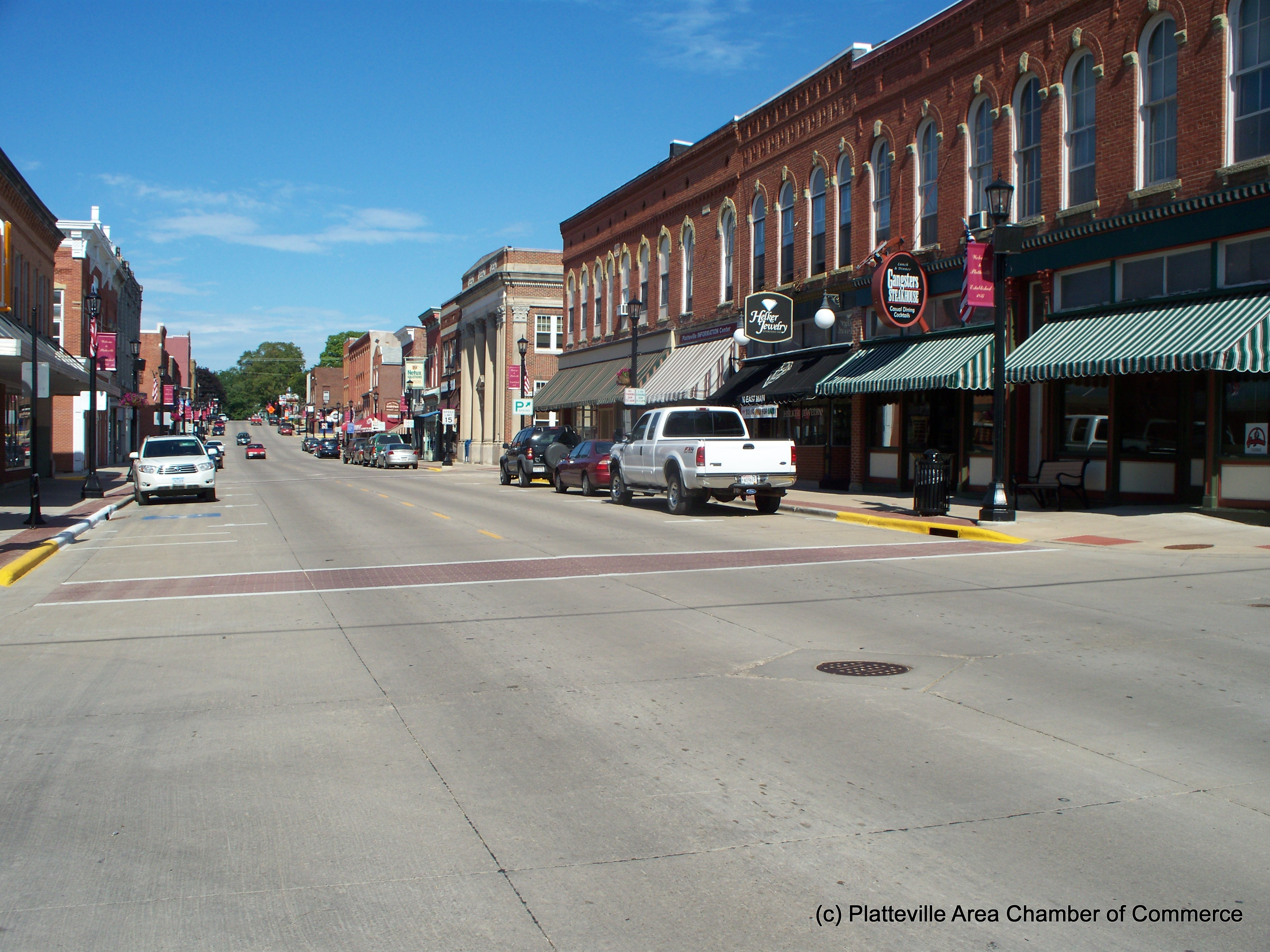
Downtown Platteville

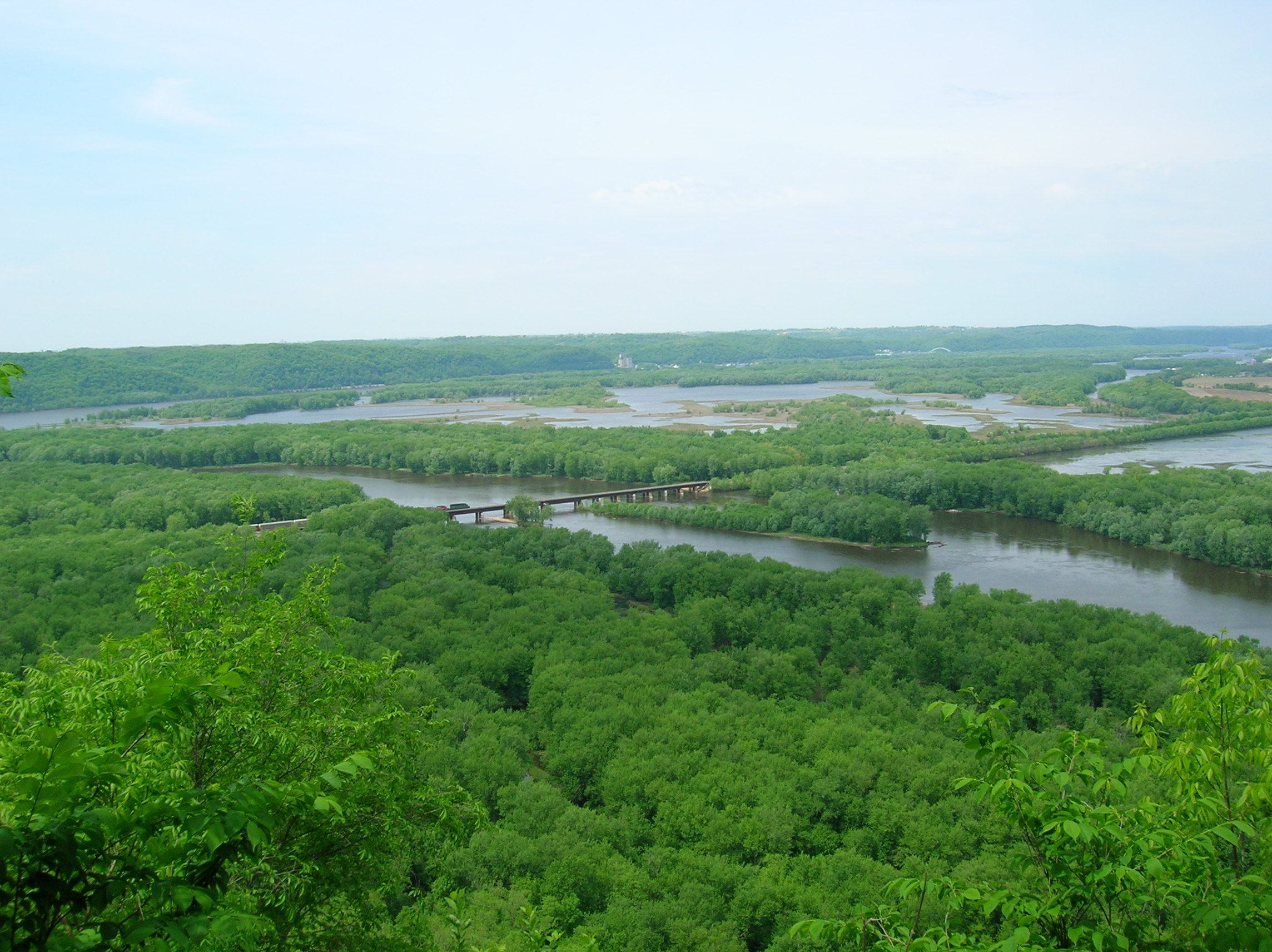
Wyalusing State Park

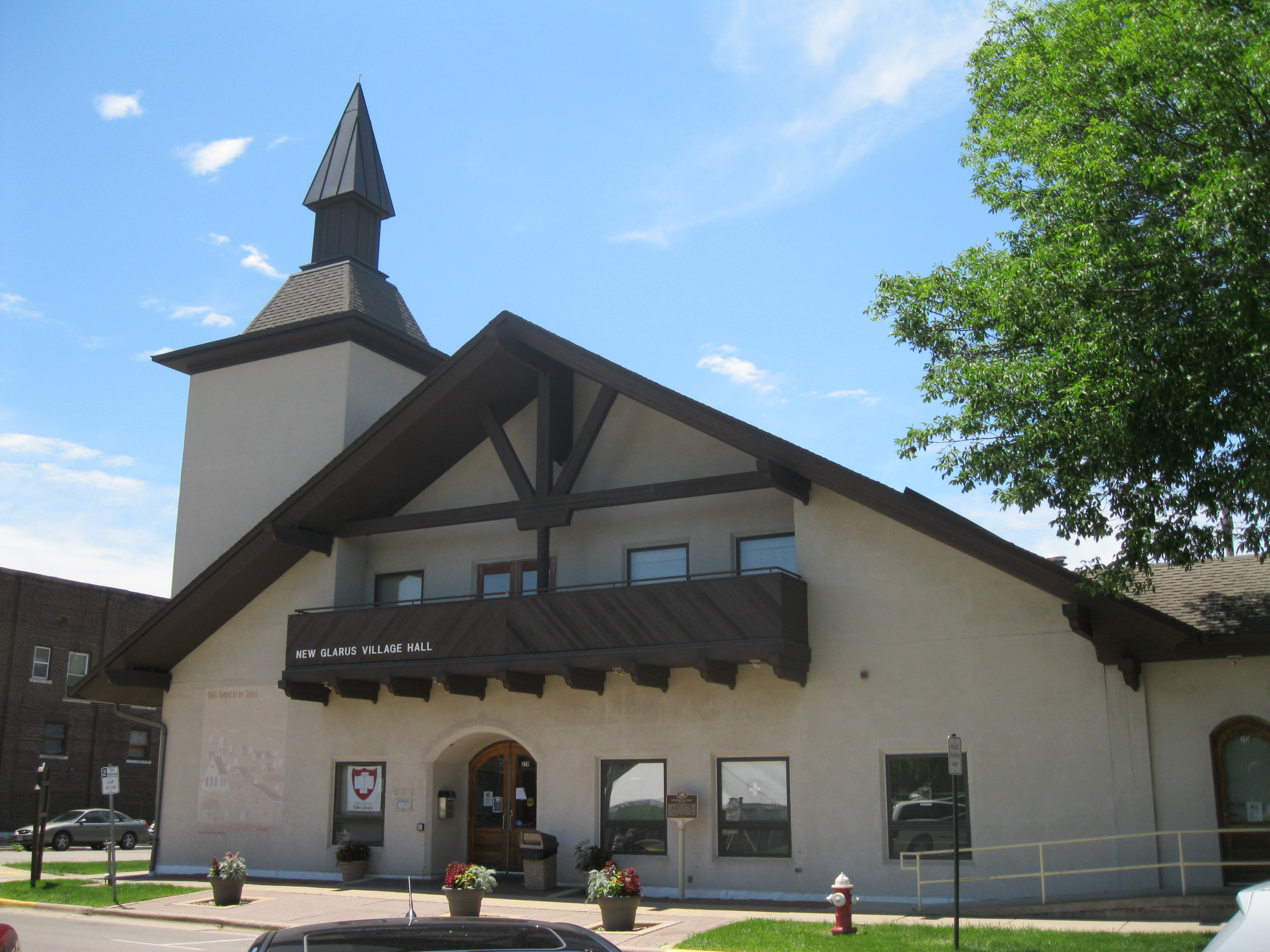
New Glarus village hall

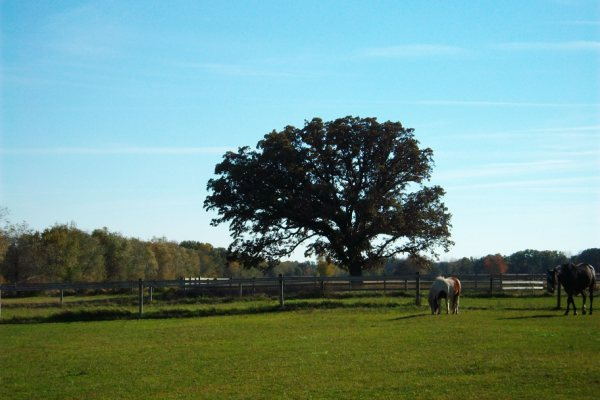
Half-Way Tree in Brodhead

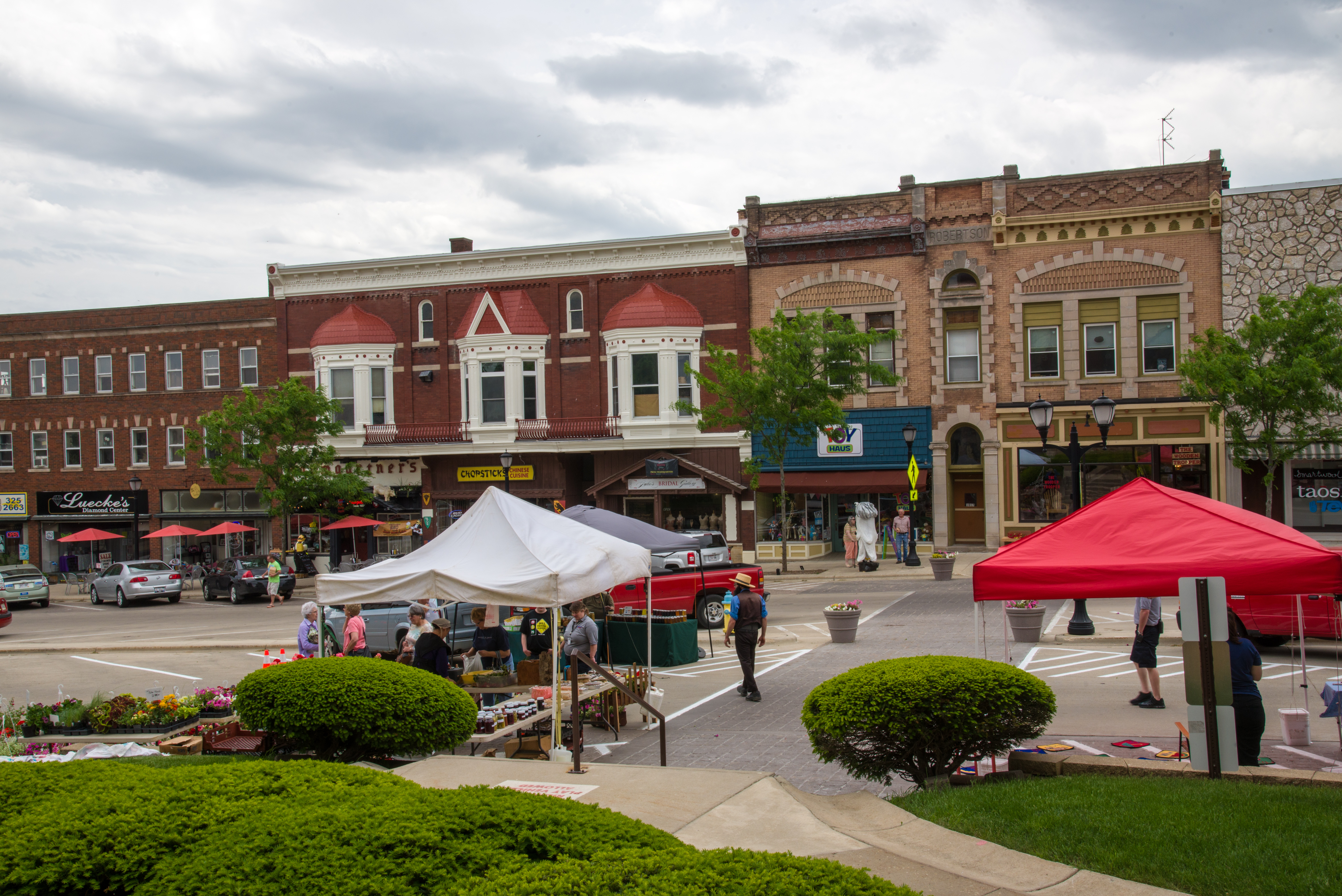
Monroe, Wisconsin

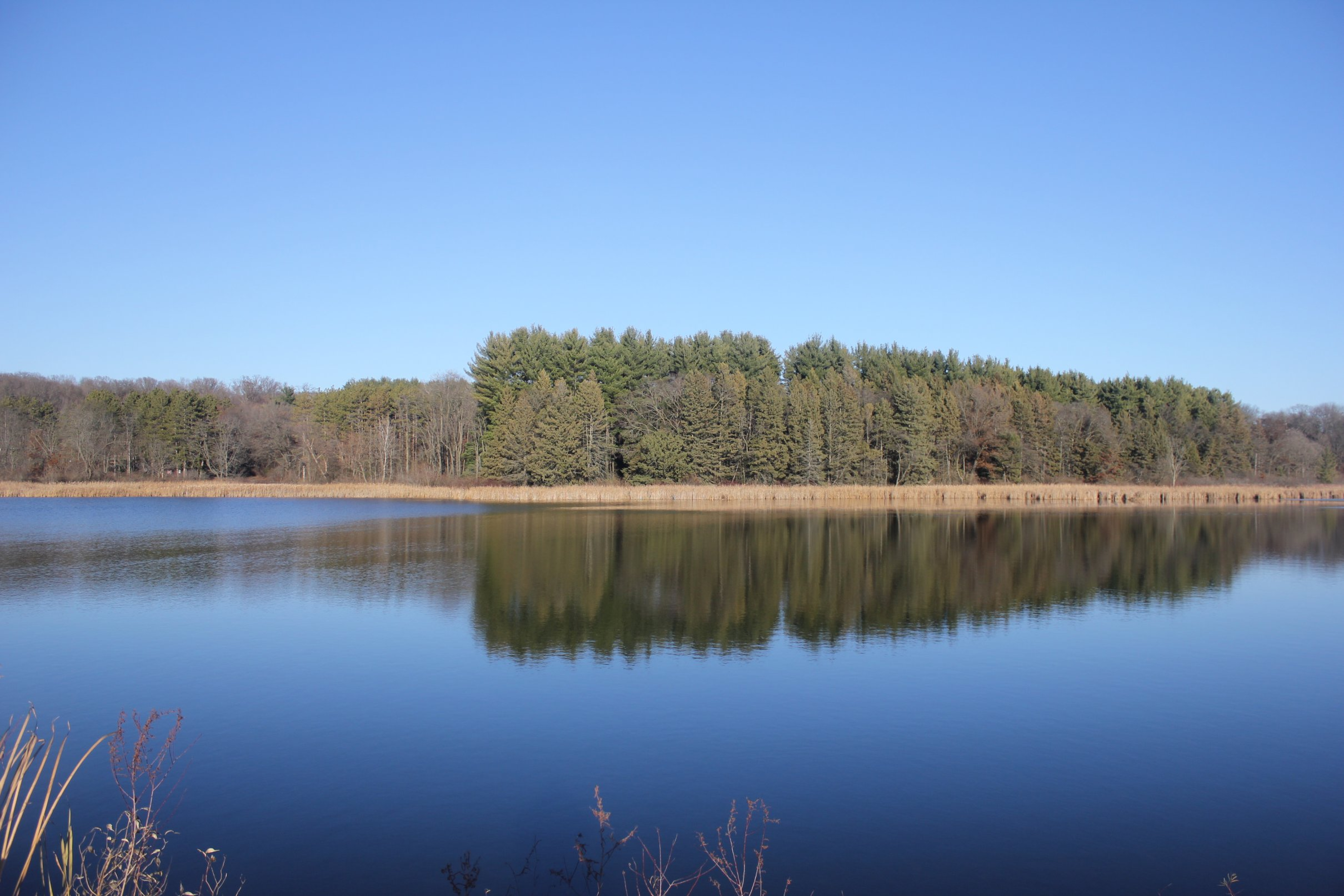
Cadiz Springs State Recreation Area

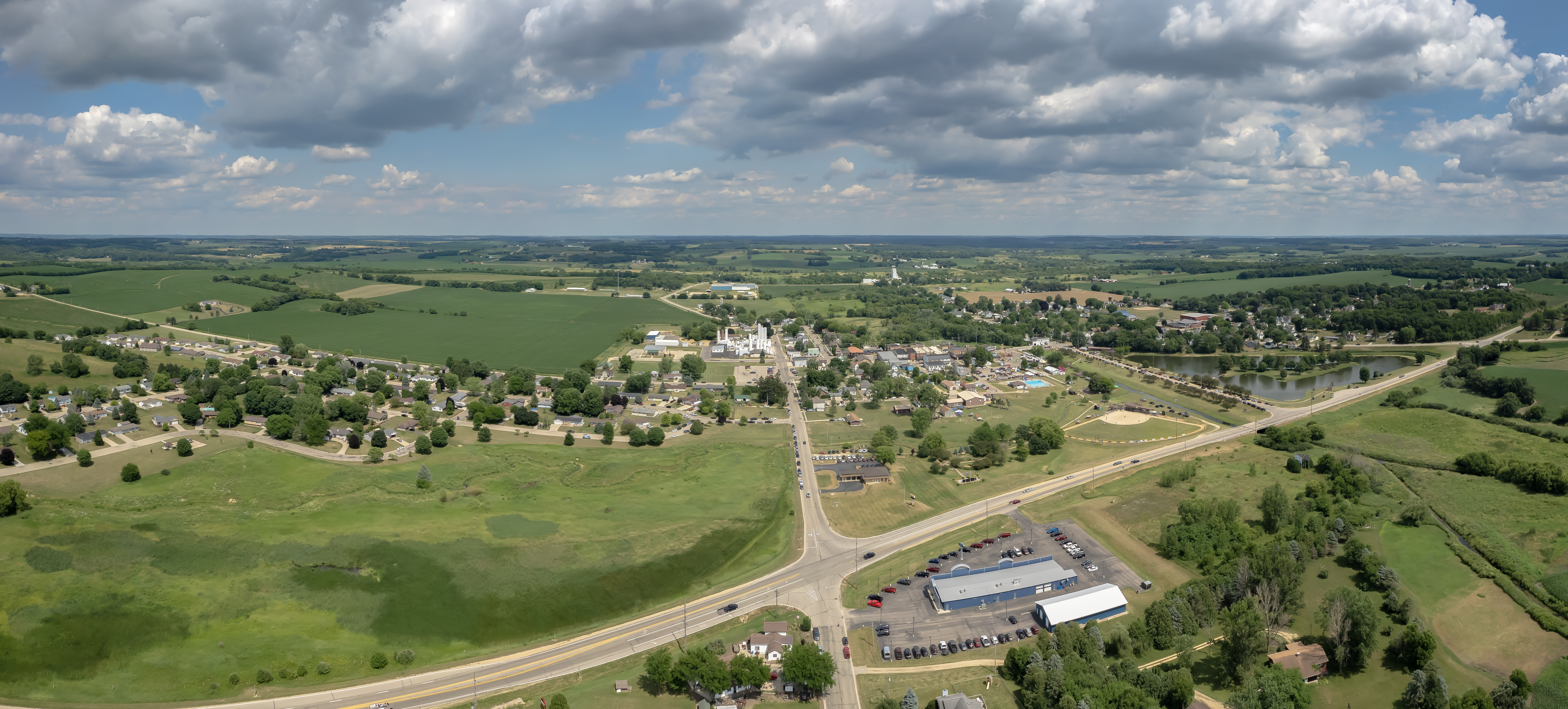
Monticello

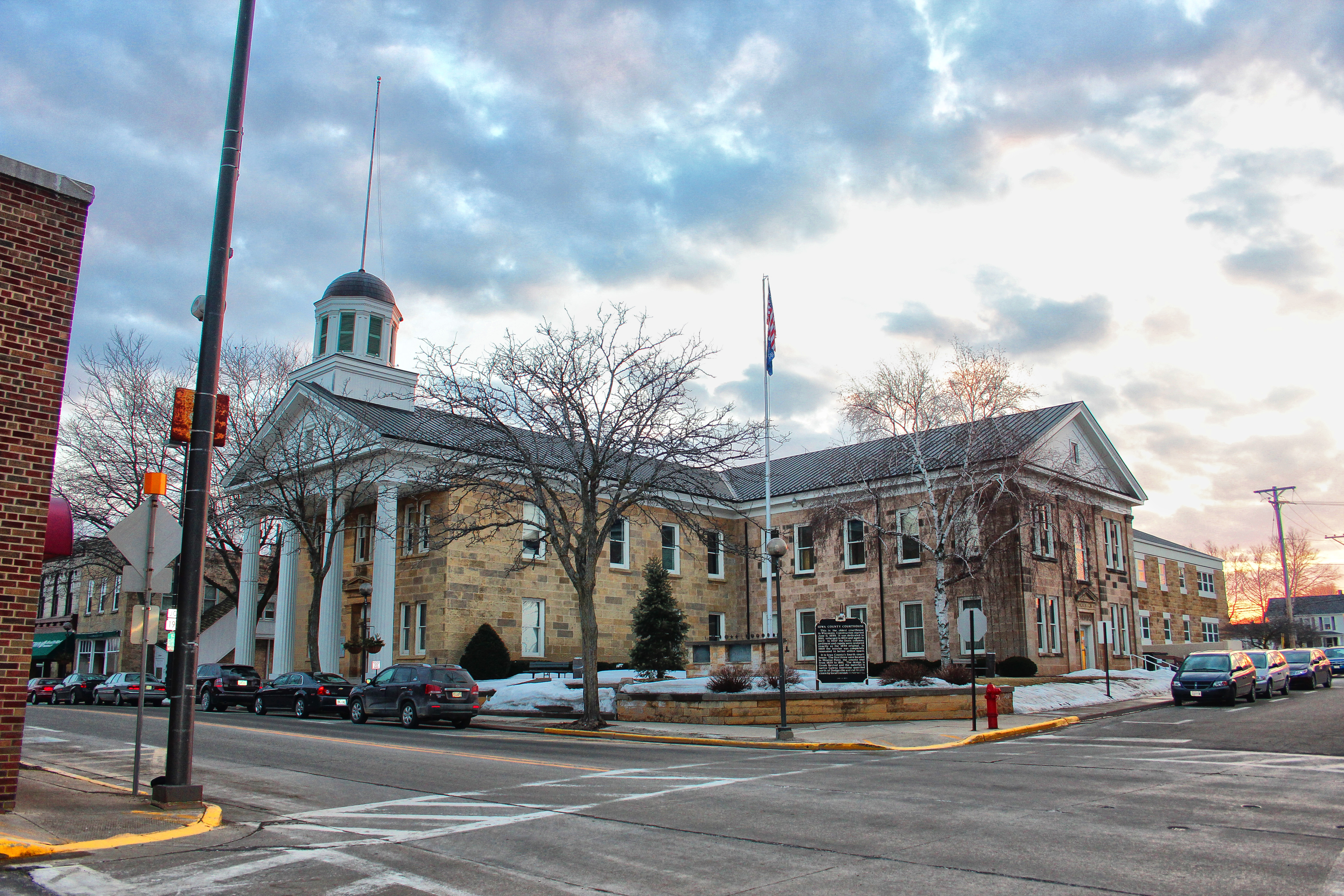
Historic Iowa County Courthouse in Dodgeville

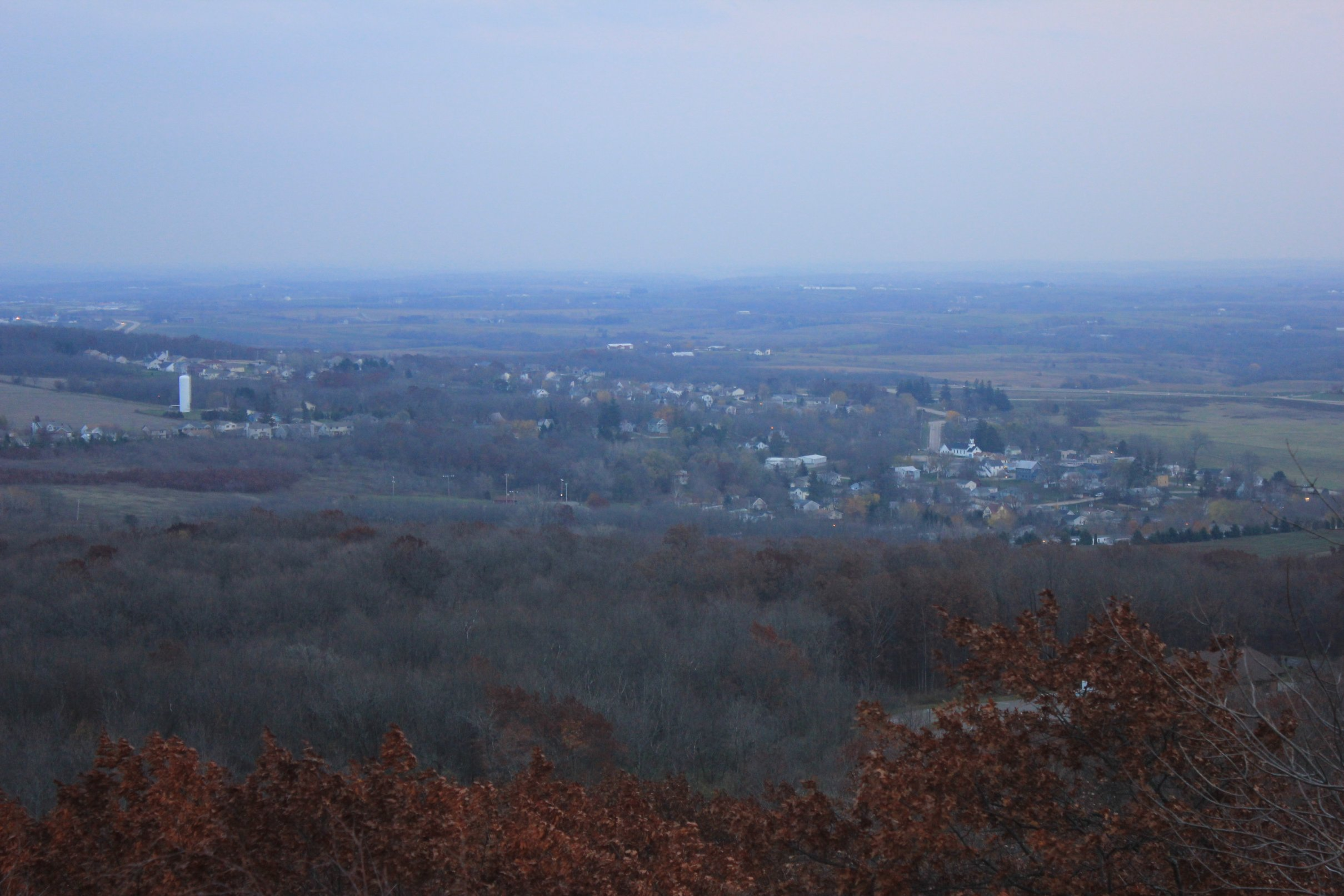
View of Blue Mounds, from Blue Mound State Park

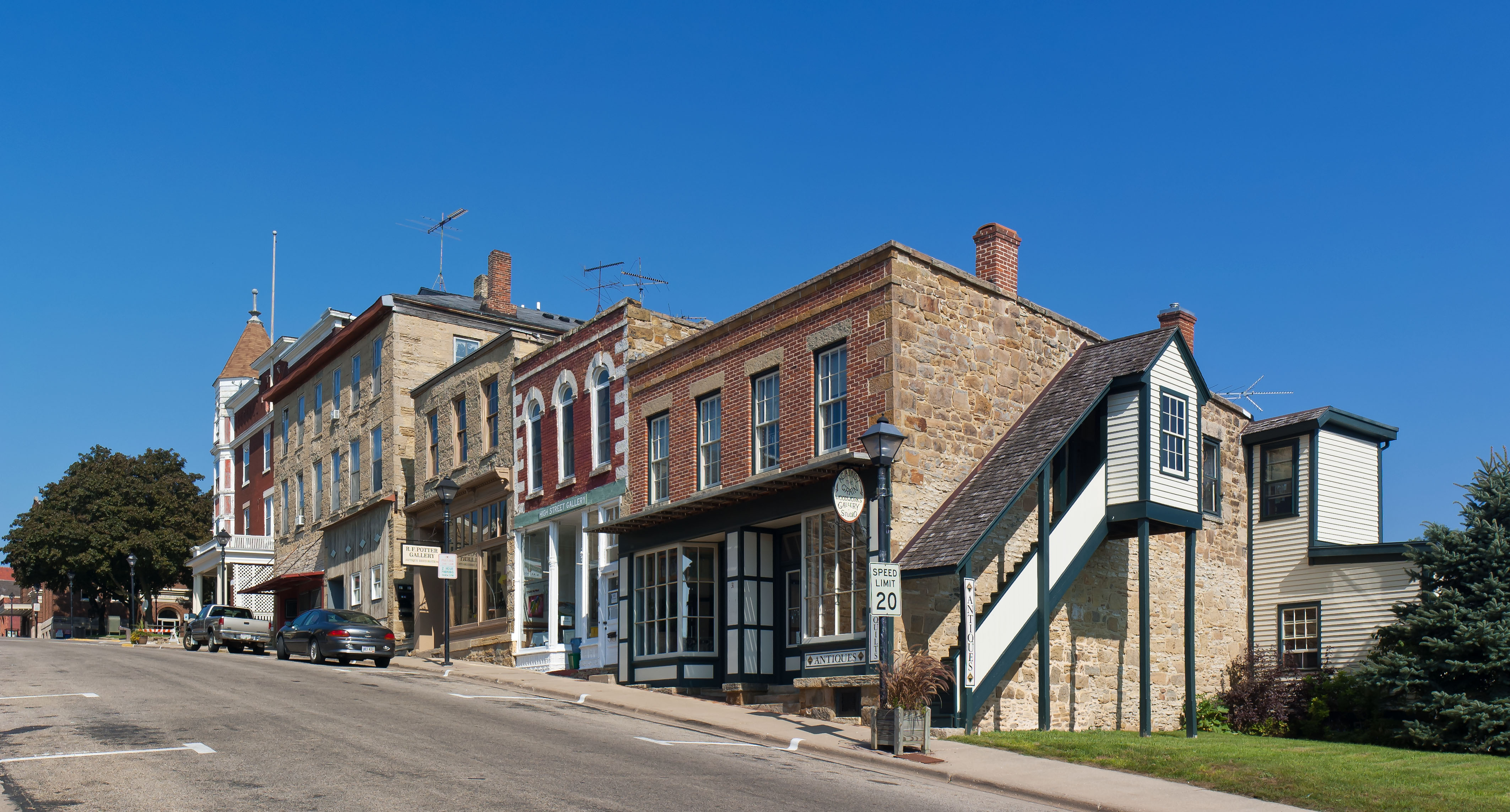
High Street in Mineral Point

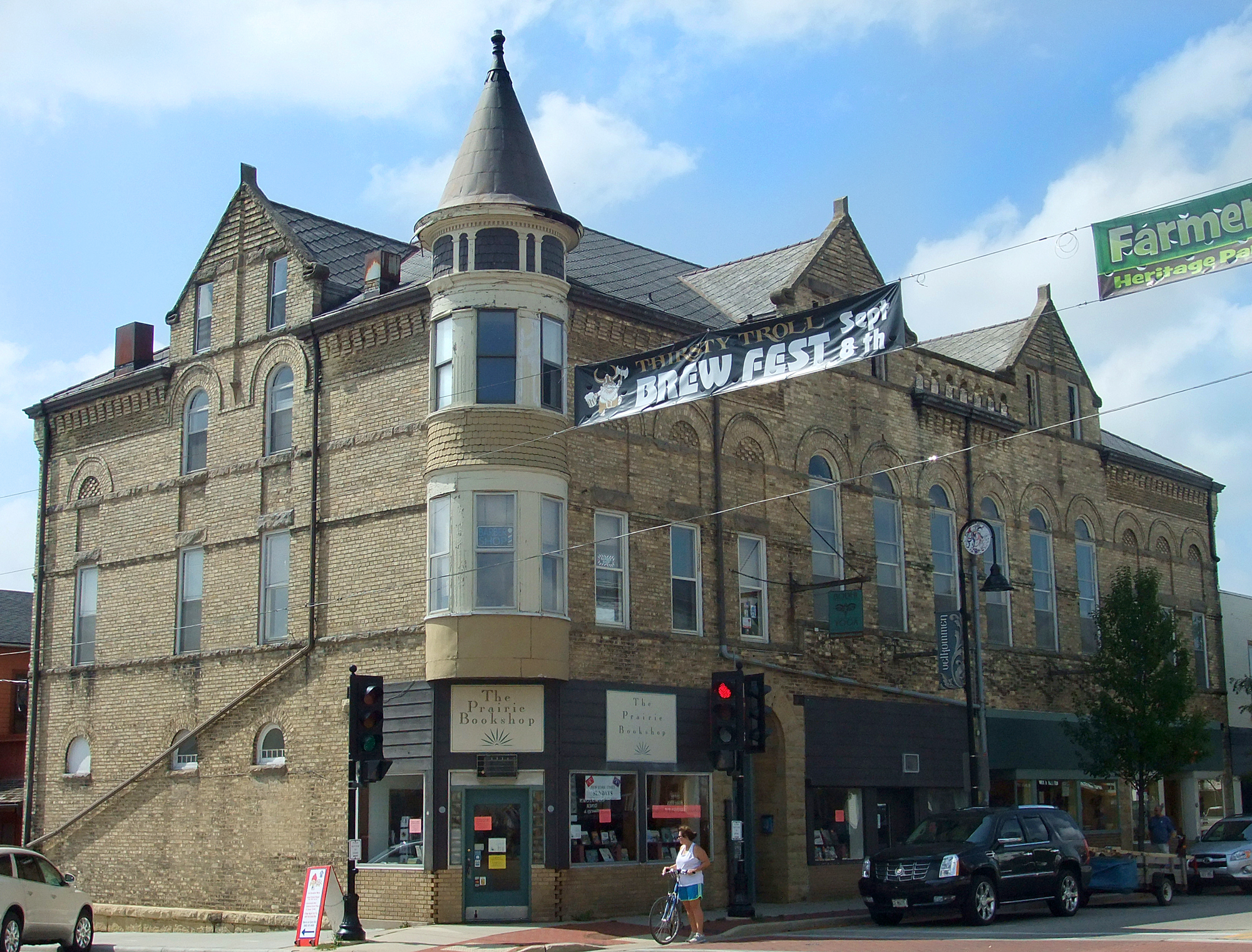
Mt. Horeb Opera Block in Mount Horeb

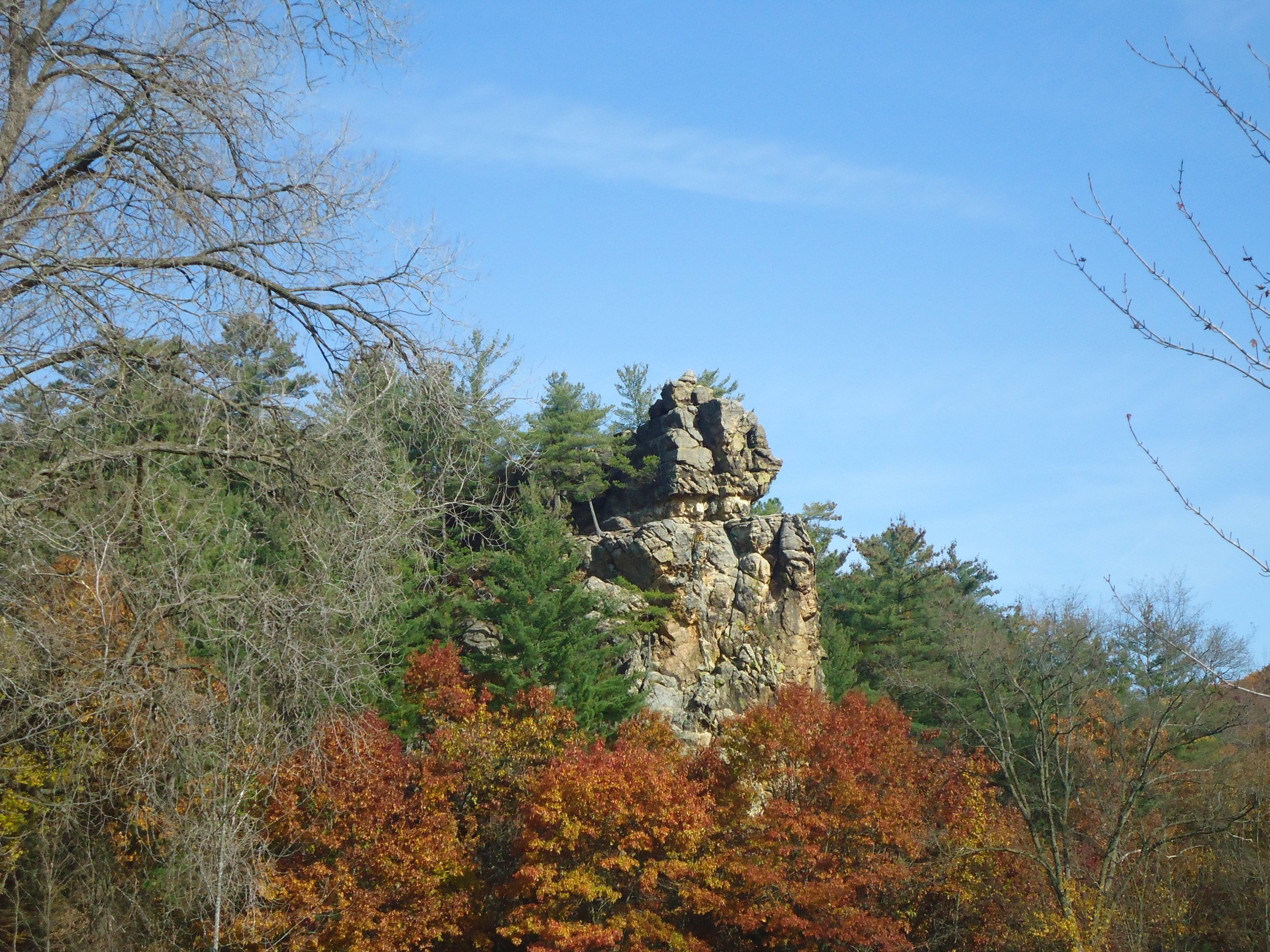
Rock Ledge in Governor Dodge State Park

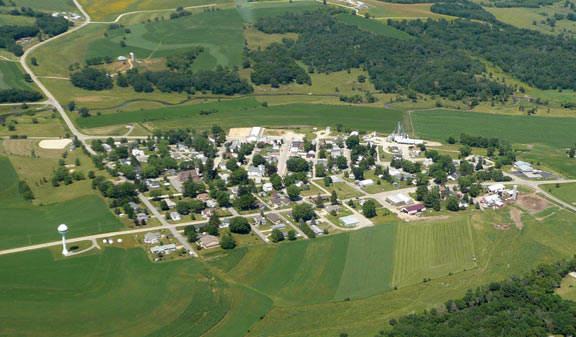
Aerial view of Hollandale

== History ==
The 17th Senate district was one of the original 19 Senate districts when Wisconsin was established as a U.S. state. The 17th district was defined in Article XIV, Section 12 of the Wisconsin Constitution as "The towns of Racine, Caledonia, Mount Pleasant, Raymond, Norway, Rochester, Yorkville, and Burlington, in the county of Racine". At that time, this list of towns constituted the northern half of Racine County, but after the establishment of Kenosha County in 1850, this collection of towns would constitute the entire territory of Racine County. During these years, the Free Soil Party was established as a splinter faction of the Democratic Party, and Racine County was a center of Free Soil power in the state of Wisconsin.

In 1852, the Wisconsin Legislature passed a reapportionment which expanded the Senate to 25 seats. The act redefined the 17th Senate district as "The towns of Janesville, Rock, Fulton, Porter, Centre, Plymouth, Newark, Avon, Spring Valley, Magnolia, and Union, in the county of Rock". This constituted the western half of Rock County. The 1856 redistricting, which expanded the Senate to 30 seats, reiterated the existing boundaries for the 17th district, but noted the addition of the city of Janesville, which was incorporated in 1853. The 1861 redistricting act, which expanded the Senate to its current number of 33 senators, expanded the 17th district to cover all of Rock County.

The district boundaries remained unchanged until 1892, when a controversial redistricting act was passed just days before the 1892 election. The new boundaries of the 17th district were defined as "The county of Green and the towns of Union, Porter, Magnolia, Center, Spring Valley, Plymouth, Avon, Newark, Beloit and the Third and Fourth wards of the city of Beloit, in the county of Rock, and the towns of Cottage Grove, Deerfield, Pleasant Springs, Dunkirk, Dunn, Rutland, Christiana, Albion and the city of Stoughton, in the county of Dane". Simplified, this constituted all of Green County, western Rock County, and southeast Dane County.

The 1892 act was quickly superseded by an 1896 act, which redefined the 17th Senate district as "Green and Lafayette counties, and the towns of Avon, Beloit, Clinton, Newark, Plymouth, Spring Valley, Turtle, and the village of Clinton, and the city of Beloit, in the county of Rock." The list of towns in Rock county constituted roughly the southern half of the county. This act was, in turn, superseded by the 1901 redistricting act which removed Rock County from the district entirely, and added Iowa County to Green and Lafayette.

In 1951, after several decades without redistricting, the Wisconsin Legislature passed the so-called Rosenberry plan, named for retired Wisconsin Supreme Court justice Marvin B. Rosenberry, who chaired the redistricting commission which drafted the plan. The new plan went into effect in the 1954 elections, after some additional wrangling and judicial arguments. Under that plan, the 17th Senate district added Grant County to Green, Lafayette, and Iowa.

In the 1960s, the Legislature missed a court-imposed deadline to pass a redistricting plan after the 1960 U.S. census. The Wisconsin Supreme Court, therefore, enforced its own plan for legislative districts in a filing in State ex rel. Reynolds v. Zimmerman. In the court-ordered plan, the 17th Senate district added Richland County to Grant, Green, Iowa, and Lafayette.

The district only changed slightly in the 1972 redistricting, the first to occur after the Supreme Court ruling requiring state legislative districts to offer equal representation. The 17th district lost several towns of northwest Grant County, and gained parts of southwest Rock County and northwest Dane County.

In the 1981–1982 session, the Legislature again failed to pass a redistricting plan, and, as a result of litigation, a panel of three federal judges ordered a new districting plan in Wisconsin State AFL-CIO v. Elections Board. Under the court-ordered plan, the 17th Senate district lost most of Richland County and northern Green County, and the parts of Dane County that had been added in 1972, it gained more of Rock County and part of southern Sauk County. This court-ordered plan was only in-effect for the 1982 election; in 1983 the Legislature acted to override the court-ordered plan with their own plan for the remainder of the 1980s elections. The 17th district regained all of Richland County and added most of Sauk County and part of southern Juneau County; it lost all of Green and Rock counties.

The 1992 redistricting was again ordered by a panel of judges, and this time was not superseded by a Legislative plan. The 1992 plan saw the 17th district add all of Juneau and the remaining parts of Grant County while losing much of Richland County. The subsequent 2002 and 2011 maps vary in boundaries, but keep roughly this configuration, stretching from Grant to Juneau, with parts of Richland, Sauk, Iowa, and Lafayette counties.

== Past senators ==
The boundaries of districts have changed over history. Previous politicians of a specific numbered district have represented different geographic areas, due to redistricting.

At statehood, the district was one of two for Racine County. It was represented by:

Senator	Party	Notes	Session	Years	District definition
District created				1848	Northern Racine County
Philo White	Dem.		1st	1848	Northern Racine County
Victor Willard	Free Soil		2nd	1849	Northern Racine County
Victor Willard	Free Soil		3rd	1850	Northern Racine County
Stephen O. Bennett	Free Soil		4th	1851	Racine County
Stephen O. Bennett	Free Soil		5th	1852	Racine County
Ezra Miller	Dem.		6th	1853	Western Rock County: Town of Avon; Town of Center; Town of Fulton; Town of Janesville; Town of Magnolia; Town of Newark; Town of Plymouth; Town of Porter; Town of Rock; Town of Spring Valley; Town of Union
Ezra Miller	Dem.		7th	1854	Western Rock County: Town of Avon; Town of Center; Town of Fulton; Town of Janesville; Town of Magnolia; Town of Newark; Town of Plymouth; Town of Porter; Town of Rock; Town of Spring Valley; Town of Union
James Sutherland	Rep.		8th	1855	Western Rock County: Town of Avon; Town of Center; Town of Fulton; Town of Janesville; Town of Magnolia; Town of Newark; Town of Plymouth; Town of Porter; Town of Rock; Town of Spring Valley; Town of Union
James Sutherland	Rep.		9th	1856	Western Rock County: Town of Avon; Town of Center; Town of Fulton; Town of Janesville; Town of Magnolia; Town of Newark; Town of Plymouth; Town of Porter; Town of Rock; Town of Spring Valley; Town of Union
James Sutherland	Rep.		10th	1857	Western Rock County: Town of Avon; Town of Center; Town of Fulton; Town of Janesville; Town of Magnolia; Town of Newark; Town of Plymouth; Town of Porter; Town of Rock; Town of Spring Valley; Town of Union; City of Janesville
James Sutherland	Rep.		11th	1858	Western Rock County: Town of Avon; Town of Center; Town of Fulton; Town of Janesville; Town of Magnolia; Town of Newark; Town of Plymouth; Town of Porter; Town of Rock; Town of Spring Valley; Town of Union; City of Janesville
Zebulon P. Burdick	Rep.		12th	1859	Western Rock County: Town of Avon; Town of Center; Town of Fulton; Town of Janesville; Town of Magnolia; Town of Newark; Town of Plymouth; Town of Porter; Town of Rock; Town of Spring Valley; Town of Union; City of Janesville
Zebulon P. Burdick	Rep.		13th	1860	Western Rock County: Town of Avon; Town of Center; Town of Fulton; Town of Janesville; Town of Magnolia; Town of Newark; Town of Plymouth; Town of Porter; Town of Rock; Town of Spring Valley; Town of Union; City of Janesville
Ezra Foot	Rep.		14th	1861	Western Rock County: Town of Avon; Town of Center; Town of Fulton; Town of Janesville; Town of Magnolia; Town of Newark; Town of Plymouth; Town of Porter; Town of Rock; Town of Spring Valley; Town of Union; City of Janesville
Ezra Foot	Rep.		15th	1862	1861–1865 1866–1870 1871–1875 1876–1881 1882–1887 1888–1891; Rock County; 1885 population: 42,620
William A. Lawrence	Rep.		16th	1863	1861–1865 1866–1870 1871–1875 1876–1881 1882–1887 1888–1891; Rock County; 1885 population: 42,620
William A. Lawrence	Rep.		17th	1864	1861–1865 1866–1870 1871–1875 1876–1881 1882–1887 1888–1891; Rock County; 1885 population: 42,620
William A. Lawrence	Natl. Union		18th	1865	1861–1865 1866–1870 1871–1875 1876–1881 1882–1887 1888–1891; Rock County; 1885 population: 42,620
William A. Lawrence	Natl. Union		19th	1866	1861–1865 1866–1870 1871–1875 1876–1881 1882–1887 1888–1891; Rock County; 1885 population: 42,620
Samuel J. Todd	Natl. Union		20th	1867	1861–1865 1866–1870 1871–1875 1876–1881 1882–1887 1888–1891; Rock County; 1885 population: 42,620
Samuel J. Todd	Natl. Union		21st	1868	1861–1865 1866–1870 1871–1875 1876–1881 1882–1887 1888–1891; Rock County; 1885 population: 42,620
Charles G. Williams	Rep.		22nd	1869	1861–1865 1866–1870 1871–1875 1876–1881 1882–1887 1888–1891; Rock County; 1885 population: 42,620
Charles G. Williams	Rep.		23rd	1870	1861–1865 1866–1870 1871–1875 1876–1881 1882–1887 1888–1891; Rock County; 1885 population: 42,620
Charles G. Williams	Rep.		24th	1871	1861–1865 1866–1870 1871–1875 1876–1881 1882–1887 1888–1891; Rock County; 1885 population: 42,620
Charles G. Williams	Rep.		25th	1872	1861–1865 1866–1870 1871–1875 1876–1881 1882–1887 1888–1891; Rock County; 1885 population: 42,620
Horatio Davis	Rep.		26th	1873	1861–1865 1866–1870 1871–1875 1876–1881 1882–1887 1888–1891; Rock County; 1885 population: 42,620
Horatio Davis	Rep.		27th	1874	1861–1865 1866–1870 1871–1875 1876–1881 1882–1887 1888–1891; Rock County; 1885 population: 42,620
Horatio Davis	Rep.		28th	1875	1861–1865 1866–1870 1871–1875 1876–1881 1882–1887 1888–1891; Rock County; 1885 population: 42,620
Horatio Davis	Rep.		29th	1876	1861–1865 1866–1870 1871–1875 1876–1881 1882–1887 1888–1891; Rock County; 1885 population: 42,620
Hamilton Richardson	Rep.		30th	1877	1861–1865 1866–1870 1871–1875 1876–1881 1882–1887 1888–1891; Rock County; 1885 population: 42,620
Hamilton Richardson	Rep.		31st	1878	1861–1865 1866–1870 1871–1875 1876–1881 1882–1887 1888–1891; Rock County; 1885 population: 42,620
Hamilton Richardson	Rep.		32nd	1879	1861–1865 1866–1870 1871–1875 1876–1881 1882–1887 1888–1891; Rock County; 1885 population: 42,620
Hamilton Richardson	Rep.		33rd	1880	1861–1865 1866–1870 1871–1875 1876–1881 1882–1887 1888–1891; Rock County; 1885 population: 42,620
Hamilton Richardson	Rep.		34th	1881	1861–1865 1866–1870 1871–1875 1876–1881 1882–1887 1888–1891; Rock County; 1885 population: 42,620
Hamilton Richardson	Rep.		35th	1882	1861–1865 1866–1870 1871–1875 1876–1881 1882–1887 1888–1891; Rock County; 1885 population: 42,620
Simon Lord	Rep.		36th	1883–1884	1861–1865 1866–1870 1871–1875 1876–1881 1882–1887 1888–1891; Rock County; 1885 population: 42,620
Simon Lord	Rep.		37th	1885–1886	1861–1865 1866–1870 1871–1875 1876–1881 1882–1887 1888–1891; Rock County; 1885 population: 42,620
Allen P. Lovejoy	Rep.		38th	1887–1888	1861–1865 1866–1870 1871–1875 1876–1881 1882–1887 1888–1891; Rock County; 1885 population: 42,620
Allen P. Lovejoy	Rep.		39th	1889–1890	1861–1865 1866–1870 1871–1875 1876–1881 1882–1887 1888–1891; Rock County; 1885 population: 42,620
Richard Burdge	Rep.		40th	1891–1892	1861–1865 1866–1870 1871–1875 1876–1881 1882–1887 1888–1891; Rock County; 1885 population: 42,620
Richard Burdge	Rep.		41st	1893–1894	Green County and southeast Dane County & western Rock County: Dane County; Town of Albion; Town of Christiana; Town of Cottage Grove; Town of Deerfield; Town of Pleasant Springs; Town of Dunkirk; Town of Dunn; Town of Rutland; City of Stoughton; Rock County; Town of Avon; Town of Beloit; Town of Center; Town of Magnolia; Town of Newark; Town of Plymouth; Town of Porter; Town of Spring Valley; Town of Union; Wards 4, 5, City of Beloit
Henry Putnam	Rep.		42nd	1895–1896	Green County and southeast Dane County & western Rock County: Dane County; Town of Albion; Town of Christiana; Town of Cottage Grove; Town of Deerfield; Town of Pleasant Springs; Town of Dunkirk; Town of Dunn; Town of Rutland; City of Stoughton; Rock County; Town of Avon; Town of Beloit; Town of Center; Town of Magnolia; Town of Newark; Town of Plymouth; Town of Porter; Town of Spring Valley; Town of Union; Wards 4, 5, City of Beloit
Henry Putnam	Rep.		43rd	1897–1898	Green and Lafayette counties and southern Rock County: Town of Avon; Town of Beloit; Town of Clinton; Town of Newark; Town of Plymouth; Town of Spring Valley; Town of Turtle; Village of Clinton; City of Beloit
Harry C. Martin	Rep.		44th	1899–1900	Green and Lafayette counties and southern Rock County: Town of Avon; Town of Beloit; Town of Clinton; Town of Newark; Town of Plymouth; Town of Spring Valley; Town of Turtle; Village of Clinton; City of Beloit
Harry C. Martin	Rep.		45th	1901–1902	Green and Lafayette counties and southern Rock County: Town of Avon; Town of Beloit; Town of Clinton; Town of Newark; Town of Plymouth; Town of Spring Valley; Town of Turtle; Village of Clinton; City of Beloit
Harry C. Martin	Rep.		46th	1903–1904	Green, Iowa, and Lafayette counties 1910 population: 64,213
Harry C. Martin	Rep.		47th	1905–1906	Green, Iowa, and Lafayette counties 1910 population: 64,213
Harry C. Martin	Rep.		48th	1907–1908	Green, Iowa, and Lafayette counties 1910 population: 64,213
Harry C. Martin	Rep.		49th	1909–1910	Green, Iowa, and Lafayette counties 1910 population: 64,213
Harry C. Martin	Rep.		50th	1911–1912	Green, Iowa, and Lafayette counties 1910 population: 64,213
Harry C. Martin	Rep.		51st	1913–1914	Green, Iowa, and Lafayette counties 1910 population: 64,213
Platt Whitman	Rep.		52nd	1915–1916	Green, Iowa, and Lafayette counties 1910 population: 64,213
Platt Whitman	Rep.		53rd	1917–1918	Green, Iowa, and Lafayette counties 1910 population: 64,213
Oscar R. Olson	Rep.		54th	1919–1920	Green, Iowa, and Lafayette counties 1910 population: 64,213
Oscar R. Olson	Rep.		55th	1921–1922	Green, Iowa, and Lafayette counties 1910 population: 64,213
Olaf H. Johnson	Rep.		56th	1923–1924	Green, Iowa, and Lafayette counties 1910 population: 64,213
Olaf H. Johnson	Rep.		57th	1925–1926	Green, Iowa, and Lafayette counties 1910 population: 64,213
Charles W. Hutchison	Rep.		58th	1927–1928	Green, Iowa, and Lafayette counties 1910 population: 64,213
Charles W. Hutchison	Rep.		59th	1929–1930	Green, Iowa, and Lafayette counties 1910 population: 64,213
William Olson	Rep.	Died Nov. 1931	60th	1931–1932	Green, Iowa, and Lafayette counties 1910 population: 64,213
Vacant			60th	1931–1932	Green, Iowa, and Lafayette counties 1910 population: 64,213
George Engebretson	Rep.	Won 1932 special election	61st	1933–1934	Green, Iowa, and Lafayette counties 1910 population: 64,213
George Engebretson	Rep.	Won 1932 special election	62nd	1935–1936	Green, Iowa, and Lafayette counties 1910 population: 64,213
George Engebretson	Rep.	Won 1932 special election	63rd	1937–1938	Green, Iowa, and Lafayette counties 1910 population: 64,213
Carl Lovelace	Rep.	Died Feb. 1941	64th	1939–1940	Green, Iowa, and Lafayette counties 1910 population: 64,213
Carl Lovelace	Rep.	Died Feb. 1941	65th	1941–1942	Green, Iowa, and Lafayette counties 1910 population: 64,213
Vacant			65th	1941–1942	Green, Iowa, and Lafayette counties 1910 population: 64,213
Melvin Olson	Rep.		66th	1943–1944	Green, Iowa, and Lafayette counties 1910 population: 64,213
Melvin Olson	Rep.		67th	1945–1946	Green, Iowa, and Lafayette counties 1910 population: 64,213
Melvin Olson	Rep.		68th	1947–1948	Green, Iowa, and Lafayette counties 1910 population: 64,213
Melvin Olson	Rep.		69th	1949–1950	Green, Iowa, and Lafayette counties 1910 population: 64,213
Melvin Olson	Rep.		70th	1951–1952	Green, Iowa, and Lafayette counties 1910 population: 64,213
Melvin Olson	Rep.		71st	1953–1954	Green, Iowa, and Lafayette counties 1910 population: 64,213
Robert S. Travis	Rep.		72nd	1955–1956	Grant, Green, Iowa, and Lafayette counties
Robert S. Travis	Rep.		73rd	1957–1958	Grant, Green, Iowa, and Lafayette counties
Robert S. Travis	Rep.		74th	1959–1960	Grant, Green, Iowa, and Lafayette counties
Robert S. Travis	Rep.		75th	1961–1962	Grant, Green, Iowa, and Lafayette counties
Gordon Roseleip	Rep.		76th	1963–1964	Grant, Green, Iowa, and Lafayette counties
Gordon Roseleip	Rep.		77th	1965–1966	Grant, Green, Iowa, Lafayette, and Richland counties
Gordon Roseleip	Rep.		78th	1967–1968	Grant, Green, Iowa, Lafayette, and Richland counties
Gordon Roseleip	Rep.		79th	1969–1970	Grant, Green, Iowa, Lafayette, and Richland counties
Gordon Roseleip	Rep.		80th	1971–1972	Grant, Green, Iowa, Lafayette, and Richland counties
Gordon Roseleip	Rep.		81st	1973–1974	Iowa, Lafayette, Richland counties and Most of Grant County; Most of Green County Southwest Rock County: Town of Avon; Town of Magnolia; Town of Newark; Town of Plymouth; Town of Spring Valley; Village of Orfordville; Part of Dane County: Town of Black Earth; Town of Mazomanie; Village of Black Earth; Village of Mazomanie
Kathryn Morrison	Dem.		82nd	1975–1976	Iowa, Lafayette, Richland counties and Most of Grant County; Most of Green County Southwest Rock County: Town of Avon; Town of Magnolia; Town of Newark; Town of Plymouth; Town of Spring Valley; Village of Orfordville; Part of Dane County: Town of Black Earth; Town of Mazomanie; Village of Black Earth; Village of Mazomanie
Kathryn Morrison	Dem.		83rd	1977–1978	Iowa, Lafayette, Richland counties and Most of Grant County; Most of Green County Southwest Rock County: Town of Avon; Town of Magnolia; Town of Newark; Town of Plymouth; Town of Spring Valley; Village of Orfordville; Part of Dane County: Town of Black Earth; Town of Mazomanie; Village of Black Earth; Village of Mazomanie
Richard Kreul	Rep.	Resigned July 1991	84th	1979–1980	Iowa, Lafayette, Richland counties and Most of Grant County; Most of Green County Southwest Rock County: Town of Avon; Town of Magnolia; Town of Newark; Town of Plymouth; Town of Spring Valley; Village of Orfordville; Part of Dane County: Town of Black Earth; Town of Mazomanie; Village of Black Earth; Village of Mazomanie
Richard Kreul	Rep.	Resigned July 1991	85th	1981–1982	Iowa, Lafayette, Richland counties and Most of Grant County; Most of Green County Southwest Rock County: Town of Avon; Town of Magnolia; Town of Newark; Town of Plymouth; Town of Spring Valley; Village of Orfordville; Part of Dane County: Town of Black Earth; Town of Mazomanie; Village of Black Earth; Village of Mazomanie
Richard Kreul	Rep.	Resigned July 1991	86th	1983–1984	Iowa, Lafayette counties and Most of Grant County; Most of Green County; Western Rock County; Southern Sauk County; Part of Richland County
Richard Kreul	Rep.	Resigned July 1991	87th	1985–1986	Iowa, Lafayette, Richland counties and Most of Grant County; Most of Sauk County; Southern Juneau County; Part of Vernon County
Richard Kreul	Rep.	Resigned July 1991	88th	1987–1988	Iowa, Lafayette, Richland counties and Most of Grant County; Most of Sauk County; Southern Juneau County; Part of Vernon County
Richard Kreul	Rep.	Resigned July 1991	89th	1989–1990	Iowa, Lafayette, Richland counties and Most of Grant County; Most of Sauk County; Southern Juneau County; Part of Vernon County
Richard Kreul	Rep.	Resigned July 1991	90th	1991–1992	Iowa, Lafayette, Richland counties and Most of Grant County; Most of Sauk County; Southern Juneau County; Part of Vernon County
Vacant			90th	1991–1992	Iowa, Lafayette, Richland counties and Most of Grant County; Most of Sauk County; Southern Juneau County; Part of Vernon County
Dale Schultz	Rep.	Won 1991 special election	90th	1991–1992	Iowa, Lafayette, Richland counties and Most of Grant County; Most of Sauk County; Southern Juneau County; Part of Vernon County
Dale Schultz	Rep.	Won 1991 special election	91st	1993–1994	Grant, Iowa, Juneau, Lafayette counties and Most of Sauk County; Northeast Richland County
Dale Schultz	Rep.	Won 1991 special election	92nd	1995–1996	Grant, Iowa, Juneau, Lafayette counties and Most of Sauk County; Northeast Richland County
Dale Schultz	Rep.	Won 1991 special election	93rd	1997–1998	Grant, Iowa, Juneau, Lafayette counties and Most of Sauk County; Northeast Richland County
Dale Schultz	Rep.	Won 1991 special election	94th	1999–2000	Grant, Iowa, Juneau, Lafayette counties and Most of Sauk County; Northeast Richland County
Dale Schultz	Rep.	Won 1991 special election	95th	2001–2002	Grant, Iowa, Juneau, Lafayette counties and Most of Sauk County; Northeast Richland County
Dale Schultz	Rep.	Won 1991 special election	96th	2003–2004	Grant, Iowa, Juneau, counties and Most of Lafayette County; Most of Sauk County; Most of Richland County; Part of Monroe County
Dale Schultz	Rep.	Won 1991 special election	97th	2005–2006	Grant, Iowa, Juneau, counties and Most of Lafayette County; Most of Sauk County; Most of Richland County; Part of Monroe County
Dale Schultz	Rep.	Won 1991 special election	98th	2007–2008	Grant, Iowa, Juneau, counties and Most of Lafayette County; Most of Sauk County; Most of Richland County; Part of Monroe County
Dale Schultz	Rep.	Won 1991 special election	99th	2009–2010	Grant, Iowa, Juneau, counties and Most of Lafayette County; Most of Sauk County; Most of Richland County; Part of Monroe County
Dale Schultz	Rep.	Won 1991 special election	100th	2011–2012	Grant, Iowa, Juneau, counties and Most of Lafayette County; Most of Sauk County; Most of Richland County; Part of Monroe County
Dale Schultz	Rep.	Won 1991 special election	101st	2013–2014	Grant, Juneau, Lafayette, Richland counties and Most of Sauk County; Western of Iowa County; Southwest Green County; Part of Monroe County
Howard Marklein	Rep.		102nd	2015–2016	Grant, Juneau, Lafayette, Richland counties and Most of Sauk County; Western of Iowa County; Southwest Green County; Part of Monroe County
Howard Marklein	Rep.		103rd	2017–2018	Grant, Juneau, Lafayette, Richland counties and Most of Sauk County; Western of Iowa County; Southwest Green County; Part of Monroe County
Howard Marklein	Rep.		104th	2019–2020	Grant, Juneau, Lafayette, Richland counties and Most of Sauk County; Western of Iowa County; Southwest Green County; Part of Monroe County
Howard Marklein	Rep.		105th	2021–2022	Grant, Juneau, Lafayette, Richland counties and Most of Sauk County; Western of Iowa County; Southwest Green County; Part of Monroe County
Howard Marklein	Rep.		106th	2023–2024	Grant, Juneau, Lafayette, Richland counties and most of Sauk County western of Iowa County southwest Green County part of Vernon County
Howard Marklein	Rep.		107th	2025–2026	Crawford, Green, Grant, Iowa, Lafayette counties and southwestern Dane County part of Vernon County part of Rock County
