= Senator Whitman =

Senator Whitman may refer to:

- Alexander B. Whitman (1854–1910), Wisconsin State Senate
- Joel Whitman (1823–1905), Wisconsin State Senate
- Platt Whitman (1871–1935), Wisconsin State Senate
