= William Olson =

American politician (1873–1931)

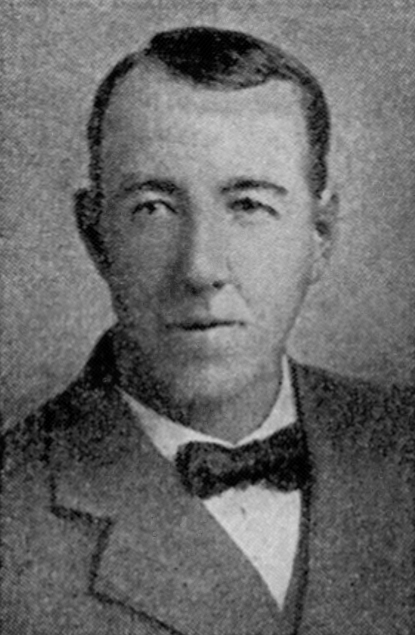
- Olson in 1919

Member of the Wisconsin Senate from the 17th district
- In office January 5, 1931 – November 1, 1931
- Preceded by: Charles W. Hutchison
- Succeeded by: George Engebretson

Member of the Wisconsin State Assembly from the Green County district
- In office January 6, 1919 – January 5, 1925
- Preceded by: S. A. Schindler
- Succeeded by: Ernst J. Hoesly

Personal details
- Born: October 11, 1873 Jordan, Wisconsin, US
- Died: November 1, 1931 (aged 58) Monroe, Wisconsin, US
- Party: Republican, Wisconsin Progressive
- Relations: Oscar R. Olson (brother)
- Education: Northern Indiana Normal School
- Occupation: Politician, farmer

William Olson (October 11, 1873 – November 1, 1931) was an American politician. A Republican and Progressive, he served in the Wisconsin State Assembly and the Wisconsin State Senate.

== Biography ==
Olson was born on October 11, 1873, in Jordan, Wisconsin. His brother was politician Oscar R. Olson. He worked on his parents' farm and attended public schools, going on to study at the Northern Indiana Normal School. He worked as an educator during winters and in 1898, established a dairy farm. He was also a banker, local school administrator, and town clerk.

Olson was a member of the Republican Party and the Wisconsin Progressive Party. He served as a town supervisor, and beginning in 1916, a member of the county board. He was a member of the Wisconsin State Assembly from 1919 to 1925; he was part of the Assembly Committee on Agriculture in 1919 and served as its president from 1921 to 1923. In 1921, he ran for Speaker of the Wisconsin State Assembly, with Riley S. Young winning after four ballots were run. He helped pass legislation to eradicate mycobacterium bovis.

Olson represented Wisconsin's 17th Senate district in the State Senate, from 1930, to until his death in 1931. During his tenure, he served on the State Governor's Council, under Robert M. La Follette. Politically, he supported cooperatives.

Olson was married with three children. He died on November 1, 1931, aged 58, in Monroe, following months of illness. A special election was held following his death, which was won by George Engebretson.
