= Oscar R. Olson =

American politician (1869–1945)

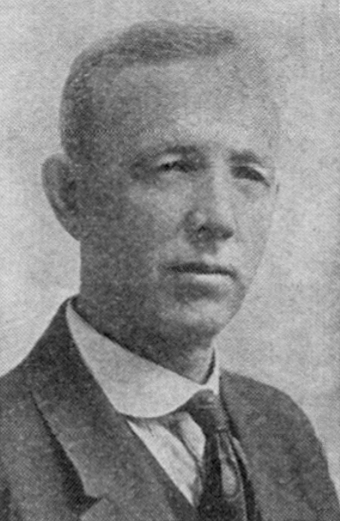
- Olson in 1919

Member of the Wisconsin Senate from the 17th district
- In office January 6, 1919 – January 1, 1923
- Preceded by: Platt Whitman
- Succeeded by: Olaf H. Johnson

Personal details
- Born: March 24, 1869 Jordan, Wisconsin, US
- Died: November 23, 1945 (aged 76) Monroe, Wisconsin, US
- Party: Republican
- Relations: William Olson (brother); John Johnson (father-in-law)
- Occupation: Politician, banker, farmer

Military service
- Allegiance: United States
- Branch/service: Wisconsin National Guard; United States Volunteers
- Years of service: 1895–1901
- Rank: Captain
- Unit: 1st Wisconsin Infantry Regiment
- Battles/wars: Spanish–American War

Oscar R. Olson (March 24, 1869 – November 23, 1945) was an American politician. A Republican, he was a member of the Wisconsin State Senate. He also engaged in agriculture and banking.

== Biography ==
Olson was born on March 24, 1869, in Jordan, Wisconsin. He was the son of Rollin Olson (1832–1898) and Mary (née Peterson) Olson (1837–1913), both immigrants from Norway in 1848. He was the brother of politician William Olson.

As a child, Olson attended public schools and worked his parents' farm during summers. He later attended Valparaiso University, afterwards becoming an educator in Dakota. Beginning in 1908, he engaged in banking, working for the Union State Bank as a cashier, later serving as vice president, then president. From 1895 to 1901, he served in the 1st Wisconsin Infantry Regiment of the Wisconsin National Guard, during which he was deployed in the Spanish–American War. By the time of his retirement, he achieved the rank of captain.

Olson was a Progressive Republican. He served as register of deeds of Green County, from 1893 to 1899. He was a member of the Wisconsin State Senate, representing the 17th district, from January 6, 1919, to January 1, 1923. During his tenure, he sponsored a bill to build the Wisconsin General Hospital.

After serving in office, Olson returned to farming. Religiously, he was a Norwegian-American Lutheran. On January 12, 1897, he married Carrie J. Johnson and they had five children together. He died on November 23, 1945, aged 76, in Monroe, from coronary occlusion. He was buried in Old York Lutheran Cemetery, in Green County.

Wisconsin Senate
Preceded by Platt Whitman	Member of the Wisconsin Senate from the 17th district January 6, 1919 – January 1, 1923	Succeeded by Olaf H. Johnson
Political offices
Preceded by J. A. Kettleson	Register of Deeds of Green County, Wisconsin; January 1, 1893 – January 1, 1899	Succeeded by John Lewis
