= Stephen Hollenbeck =

Wisconsin pioneer

Stephen P. Hollenbeck

Member of the Wisconsin State Assembly from the Iowa 1st district
- In office January 1, 1855 – January 7, 1856
- Preceded by: Lemuel W. Joiner
- Succeeded by: Ephraim Knowlton

Personal details
- Born: March 28, 1801 Richmond, Vermont, U.S.
- Died: March 26, 1895 (aged 93) Concord, Minnesota, U.S.
- Resting place: Concord Cemetery, Concord, Minnesota
- Party: Republican
- Spouses: Sarah Sumner Jennison (died 1833); Harriet Blair (m. 1842; died 1854); Deborah (Hook) Brown (m. 1856–1895)
- Children: Charles Hollenbeck^{(b. 1843; died 1843)}; Mary Ann (Currier)^{(b. 1847; died 1925)}; Jennie B. (Stewart)^{(b. 1862; died 1917)}; Stephen Hollenbeck Jr.^{(b. 1868; died 1892)}

Stephen Pearl Hollenbeck (March 28, 1801 – March 26, 1895) was an American millwright, miner, politician, and Wisconsin pioneer. He was a member of the Wisconsin State Assembly, representing Iowa County in the 1855 session, and was also a delegate to Wisconsin's second constitutional convention, which produced the Constitution of Wisconsin.

== Biography ==
Stephen Hollenbeck was born in Chittenden County, Vermont, in March 1801. He received a common school education and was trained as a millwright. He moved west to the Wisconsin Territory in 1834, and settled in Iowa County. He was part of one of the most productive lead mines in Iowa County in his early years after arriving in Wisconsin.

In 1840, he was involved in an incident with a band of Winnebago. The Winnebago had returned to lands that had been ceded by treaty and were then part of Richland County, Wisconsin Territory. Governor Henry Dodge asked Hollenbeck to go to convince the Winnebago to respect the treaty. The Winnebago apparently surrendered to Hollenbeck, who turned them over to a United States Army patrol.

His history includes another interesting anecdote from pioneer life. Apparently the first teacher in the Centerville region of the town of Highland, Mrs. H. Clarke, was quite unpopular with the parents and they sought to replace her after her first year. When the next school year was set to start, however, she showed up and refused to leave. Hollenbeck was one of several men who then attempted to board up and secure the schoolhouse, but she occupied the place again the next day and threw them out when they tried to remove her. She remained a teacher at the schoolhouse for years afterward.

In 1847, after the first attempted constitution of Wisconsin was rejected by voters, a new constitutional convention was called for the Winter of 1847–1848. Hollenbeck was elected as a delegate of Iowa County to this second convention, though he apparently took little role in the drafting of the document. The convention did produce the Constitution of Wisconsin, which was ratified by voters in the Spring of 1848.

After Wisconsin statehood, he served one term in the Wisconsin State Assembly. He was elected to the 1855 session from Iowa County's first Assembly district—the northern half of the county. He was then a member of the new Republican Party, in its first election after its founding. He subsequently moved to Green Lake County, Wisconsin.

== Personal life and family ==
Hollenbeck was one of at least nine children born to Abram Hollenbeck and his wife Abigail (née Brownson). Stephen Hollenbeck married three times. His first wife was Sarah Swanson Jennison of Swanton, Vermont. They had no children, and she died in 1833, just before he moved to the Wisconsin Territory. In Wisconsin, he married Harriet Blair, the eldest child of Alexander Blair, who had brought his family to Grant County from Ohio. With Blair, he had at least two children, Charles, who died in infancy, and Mary Ann, who married Henry Currier. Hollenbeck's second wife died in 1854, and he subsequently married Deborah Brown (née Hook), a widow, with whom he had at least two more children.

In his later years, Hollenbeck resided in Concord, Minnesota, with his daughter, Mary Ann Currier, and her family. He died there in 1895.

Wisconsin State Assembly
Preceded by Lemuel W. Joiner	Member of the Wisconsin State Assembly from the Iowa 1st district January 1, 1855 – January 7, 1856	Succeeded by Ephraim Knowlton
