= David William Hutchison =

United States Air Force general

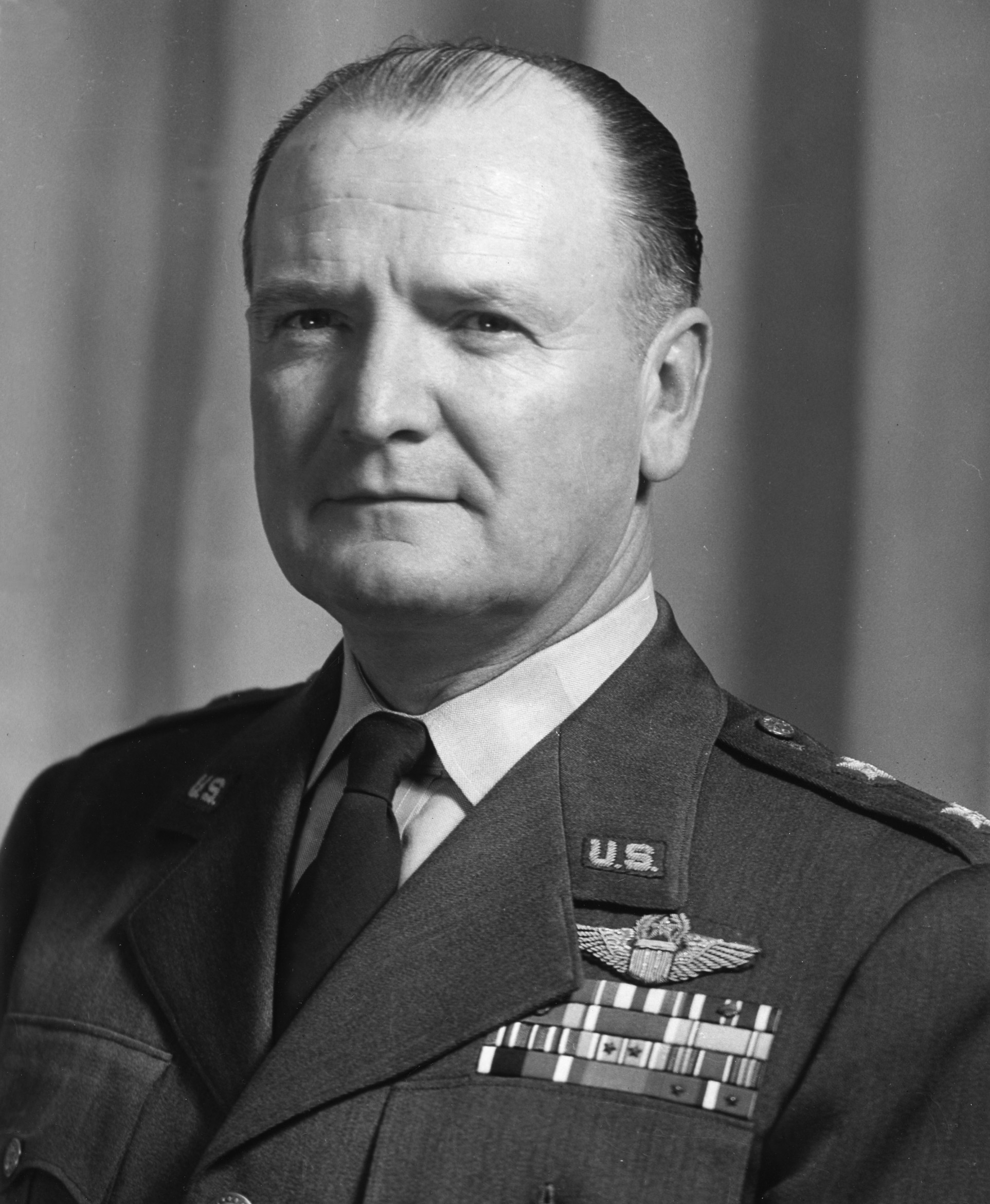
- Born: May 21, 1908; Mineral Point, Wisconsin
- Died: September 24, 1982 (aged 74)
- Military career
- Allegiance: United States of America
- Branch: United States Air Force
- Rank: Major General

David William Hutchison (May 21, 1908 – September 24, 1982) was a major general in the United States Air Force.

Hutchison was born on May 21, 1908, in Mineral Point, Wisconsin. His father, Charles W. Hutchison, was a member of the Wisconsin State Senate.

Hutchison graduated from the United States Military Academy in 1931. During World War II, Hutchison served with the Fifth Air Force and later commanded the 308th Bombardment Wing. While in command, he participated in the Battle of Biak, the Battle of Leyte, and the Battle of Luzon. Following the war, he was given command of the 314th Air Division, the 97th Bombardment Wing, the 21st Air Division, and the 5th Air Division, before being selected as the first commander of the Seventeenth Air Force. During his time in command of the 21st Division, which at the time was based at Forbes Air Force Base in Shawnee County, Kansas, he received a letter of commendation from Governor Edward F. Arn for relief efforts during flooding from the Kansas River in 1951. In 1954, he was named Deputy for Operations of Tactical Air Command and in 1958 was given command of the Ninth Air Force.

Awards he received include the Distinguished Service Medal, the Silver Star, the Distinguished Flying Cross with oak leaf cluster, the Air Medal with oak leaf cluster, the Purple Heart, the Asiatic-Pacific Campaign Medal, the Philippine Liberation Medal, the World War II Victory Medal, the Army of Occupation Medal, the National Defense Service Medal, the Air Force Longevity Service Award with silver oak leaf cluster and bronze oak leaf cluster, and the Distinguished Service Order of the United Kingdom.

He died on September 24, 1982.

“The General” was married to Jean Dorothy Miller and they claimed he won her in a card game as she was an army nurse. He had three children, David William Hutchison, William David Hutchison and daughter Adrian Jean Hutchison and a big brown Chesapeake Bay Retriever named Marco.
