= Olaf H. Johnson =

American politician (1892–1966)

Olaf H. Johnson (March 10, 1892 – January 28, 1966) was an American politician.

Olaf Johnson was born on a farm near Wiota, Wisconsin. He was the son of Christ H. Johnson (1862-1938) and Ingeborg Johnson (1861-1935). Johnson graduated from St. Olaf College and was in the insurance business. He was private secretary to Congressman John M. Nelson. He resigned when he was elected to the Wisconsin State Senate in 1922 as a Republican from District 17 (Iowa, Lafayette and Green counties). He replaced Oscar R. Olson who had been elected in 1919. He was later an unsuccessful candidate for Lieutenant Governor of Wisconsin in 1938 as a member of the Wisconsin Progressive Party and for the Senate in 1958 as a Democrat.
