= Lemuel W. Joiner =

19th century American politician

Member of the Wisconsin Senate from the 15th district
- In office January 4, 1869 – January 2, 1871
- Preceded by: Joel Whitman
- Succeeded by: Francis Little
- In office January 7, 1861 – January 5, 1863
- Preceded by: Charles Rodolf
- Succeeded by: George L. Frost
- In office January 5, 1857 – January 3, 1859
- Preceded by: Amasa Cobb
- Succeeded by: Charles Rodolf

Member of the Wisconsin State Assembly from the Iowa 1st district
- In office January 2, 1854 – January 1, 1855
- Preceded by: Henry Madden
- Succeeded by: Stephen P. Hollenbeck

Personal details
- Born: November 9, 1810 Royalton, Vermont, U.S.
- Died: October 22, 1886 (aged 75) Wyoming, Iowa County, Wisconsin, U.S.
- Resting place: Wyoming Cemetery, Wyoming, Wisconsin
- Party: Republican
- Spouse: Cynthia Ann Lucas (died 1905)
- Children: Robert Lucas Joiner^{(b. 1841; died 1920)}; Julia Charlotte (LaBarre)^{(b. 1845; died 1947)}; Mary Ellen (Morris)^{(b. 1848; died 1940)}; Florence Joiner^{(b. 1851; died 1865)}; Franklin Joiner^{(b. 1854; died 1863)}; Anne Lethe Joiner^{(b. 1857; died 1881)}; Alice J. (Franklin)^{(b. 1857; died 1887)}

Lemuel Whiting Joiner (November 9, 1810 – October 22, 1886) was an American farmer, Republican politician, and Wisconsin pioneer. He served six years in the Wisconsin State Senate and one year in the State Assembly, representing Iowa County. His son, Robert Joiner, also served in the Legislature.

== Biography ==
Joiner was born in 1810 in Royalton, Vermont. He moved to Cincinnati in 1830 and then to Williamsport, Indiana in 1834. In 1845 he moved to Wyoming, Iowa County, Wisconsin, which was his primary residence for the rest of his life. Joiner died on October 22, 1886.

Joiner's son, Robert, also served in the Senate.

== Career ==
Joiner was elected to the Assembly in 1853. He was later a member of the Senate three times. First, from 1857 to 1858, second, from 1861 to 1862 and third, from 1869 to 1870. He was a Republican.

Wisconsin State Assembly
Preceded by Henry Madden	Member of the Wisconsin State Assembly from the Iowa 1st district January 2, 1854 – January 1, 1855	Succeeded by Stephen P. Hollenbeck
Wisconsin Senate
Preceded by Amasa Cobb	Member of the Wisconsin Senate from the 15th district January 5, 1857 – January 3, 1859	Succeeded by Charles Rodolf
Preceded by Charles Rodolf	Member of the Wisconsin Senate from the 15th district January 7, 1861 – January 5, 1863	Succeeded by George L. Frost
Preceded by Joel Whitman	Member of the Wisconsin Senate from the 15th district January 4, 1869 – January 2, 1871	Succeeded by Francis Little
