= Hanover, Wisconsin =

Census-designated place in Wisconsin, United States

- Census-designated place
- Location in Rock County and the state of Wisconsin.
- Coordinates: 42°38′19″N 89°09′43″W
- Country: United States
- State: Wisconsin
- County: Rock

Area
  - Total: 0.574 sq mi (1.49 km^{2})
  - Land: 0.574 sq mi (1.49 km^{2})
  - Water: 0 sq mi (0 km^{2})
- Elevation: 794 ft (242 m)

Population (2020)
  - Total: 179
  - Density: 312/sq mi (120/km^{2})
- Time zone: UTC-6 (Central (CST))
  - Summer (DST): UTC-5 (CDT)
- ZIP Code: 53542
- Area code: 608
- GNIS feature ID: 1566042

Hanover is an unincorporated census-designated place located in the town of Plymouth, Rock County, Wisconsin, United States. It is west of Janesville and east of Orfordville. As of the 2020 census, its population was 179.

== History ==
Hanover was originally called Bass Creek. The present name is after Hanover Green, and Plymouth, Luzerne County, Pennsylvania, the native home of a large share of the early settlers. A post office was established as Bass Creek in 1856 and renamed Hanover in 1859; the post office closed in 2014. The original town of Hanover, York County, Pennsylvania was named after the German city of Hanover, a principal city of the York-Hanover metropolitan area.

== Demographics ==
Historical population
Census	Pop.	Note	%±
2010	181		—
2020	179		−1.1%
U.S. Decennial Census
