= Lake Eliza, Indiana =

- Census-designated place
- Location within Indiana Location within the United States
- Coordinates: 41°25′50″N 87°10′52″W
- Country: United States
- State: Indiana
- County: Porter
- Township: Porter

Area
  - Total: 0.543 sq mi (1.41 km^{2})
  - Land: 0.475 sq mi (1.23 km^{2})
  - Water: 0.068 sq mi (0.18 km^{2})
- Elevation: 751 ft (229 m)
- Time zone: UTC-5 (Eastern (EST))
  - Summer (DST): UTC-4 (EDT)
- ZIP codes: 46341 (Hebron); 46385 (Valparaiso)
- Area code: 219
- GNIS feature ID: 2830498
- FIPS code: 18-41112

Lake Eliza is an unincorporated community and census-designated place (CDP) in Porter County, Indiana, United States.

== Geography ==
Lake Eliza is in western Porter County, surrounding the natural lake of the same name. It is 8 miles (13 km) north of Hebron, the same distance southwest of Valparaiso, the Porter county seat, and 17 miles (27 km) southeast of Gary.

According to the U.S. Census Bureau, the Lake Eliza CDP has an area of 0.54 square miles (1.40 km^{2}), of which 0.48 square miles (1.24 km^{2}) are land and 0.07 square miles (0.18 km^{2}), or 12.52%, are water. The lake outlet is at its south end, flowing into Wolf Creek, part of the Kankakee River watershed leading to the Illinois River.

== Demographics ==
The United States Census Bureau delineated Lake Eliza as a census designated place in the 2022 American Community Survey.
