= Joel Whitman =

American politician (1823–1905)

Member of the Wisconsin Senate from the 15th district
- In office January 7, 1867 – January 4, 1869
- Preceded by: Wyman Lincoln
- Succeeded by: Lemuel W. Joiner

Personal details
- Born: February 1, 1823 Wells, New York, U.S.
- Died: November 1, 1905 (aged 82) Dodgeville, Wisconsin, U.S.
- Resting place: East Side Cemetery, Dodgeville, Wisconsin
- Party: Republican; Natl. Union (1864–1867)
- Spouse: Annabel McClure (died 1914)
- Children: George Rose Whitman^{(b. 1867; died 1898)}; Platt Whitman^{(b. 1871; died 1935)}; Frank M. Whitman^{(b. 1873)}; Roscoe C. Whitman^{(b. 1881; died 1961)}

Joel Whitman (February 1, 1823 – November 1, 1905) was an American carpenter and Republican politician. He served two years as a member of the Wisconsin State Senate, representing Iowa County.

== Biography ==
Whitman was born in Wells, New York, in 1823. Later, he moved to Ridgeway, Wisconsin. His son, Platt Whitman, was a member of the Wisconsin State Assembly. Whitman died in Dodgeville, Wisconsin in 1905, where he was also buried.

== Career ==
After serving as a justice of the peace and Clerk of Ridgeway, Whitman was the Wisconsin circuit court clerk for Iowa County from 1860 to 1866. He represented the 15th State Senate district in 1867 and 1868. Additionally, he was postmaster, a trustee, and village president of Dodgeville.

Wisconsin Senate
Preceded by Wyman Lincoln	Member of the Wisconsin Senate from the 15th district January 7, 1867 – January 4, 1869	Succeeded by Lemuel W. Joiner
