= Jordan, Wisconsin =

- Town
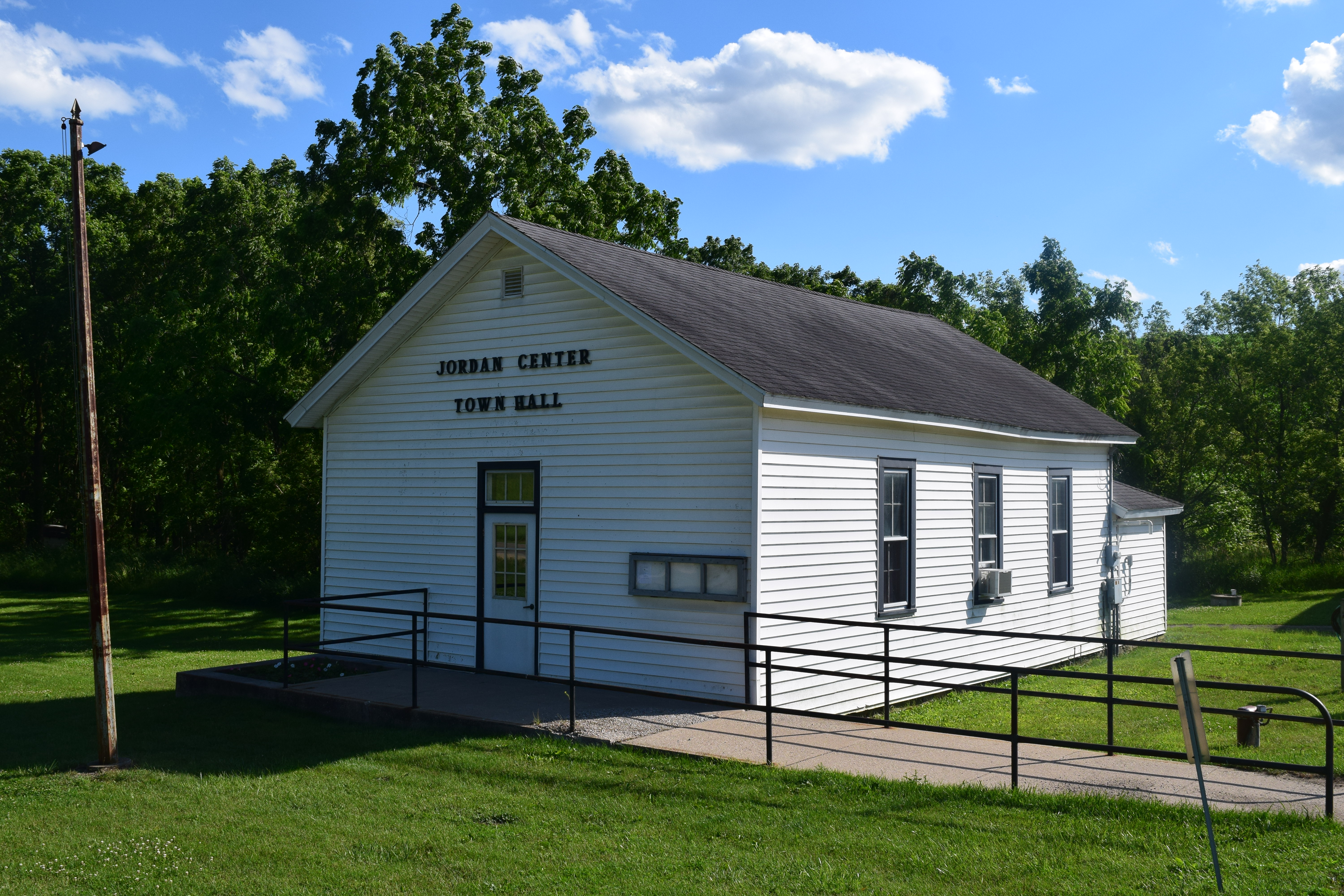
- Jordan Center Town Hall

- Location in Green County and the state of Wisconsin.
- Coordinates: 42°38′27″N 89°46′54″W
- Country: United States
- State: Wisconsin
- County: Green

Area
  - Total: 36.0 sq mi (93.3 km^{2})
  - Land: 36.0 sq mi (93.2 km^{2})
  - Water: 0 sq mi (0.0 km^{2})
- Elevation: 817 ft (249 m)

Population (2020)
  - Total: 602
  - Density: 16.7/sq mi (6.46/km^{2})
- Time zone: UTC-6 (Central (CST))
  - Summer (DST): UTC-5 (CDT)
- Area code: 608
- FIPS code: 55-38550
- GNIS feature ID: 1583459

Jordan is a town in Green County, Wisconsin, United States. The population was 602 at the 2020 census. The unincorporated community of Jordan Center is located part of the Stevens Point Micropolitan Statistical Area

== Geography ==
According to the United States Census Bureau, the town has a total area of 36.0 square miles (93.3 km^{2}), of which 36.0 square miles (93.2 km^{2}) is land and 0.03% is water.

== History ==
The first settlement, within the limits now comprising the town of Jordan, was made by William Brazel. In 1836, he raised the first corn and in 1837 raised the first crop of wheat in the township. Others to follow him were: John and George Shelton from Virginia in 1836, Lars Larson Bothan from Norway in 1843, brothers Ole Iverson from Vik Municipality, Norway, in 1843 and Axel Iverson from Voss Municipality, Norway, in 1844, Curtis Hard and Henry Crary in 1845. At the junction of Jordan Creek and the Pecatonica River, the early settlers believed there would some day be a city. Steamboats came up the river to that point in 1845.

== Demographics ==
As of the census of 2000, there were 577 people, 200 households, and 159 families residing in the town. The population density was 16.0 people per square mile (6.2/km^{2}). There were 219 housing units at an average density of 6.1 per square mile (2.3/km^{2}). The racial makeup of the town was 99.65% White, 0.17% African American and 0.17% Asian. Hispanic or Latino of any race were 0.69% of the population.

There were 200 households, out of which 40.0% had children under the age of 18 living with them, 73.0% were married couples living together, 3.5% had a female householder with no husband present, and 20.5% were non-families. 16.0% of all households were made up of individuals, and 6.5% had someone living alone who was 65 years of age or older. The average household size was 2.89 and the average family size was 3.28.

In the town, the population was spread out, with 29.6% under the age of 18, 7.6% from 18 to 24, 27.4% from 25 to 44, 25.1% from 45 to 64, and 10.2% who were 65 years of age or older. The median age was 38 years. For every 100 females, there were 112.1 males. For every 100 females age 18 and over, there were 112.6 males.

The median income for a household in the town was $46,458, and the median income for a family was $49,821. Males had a median income of $31,181 versus $22,083 for females. The per capita income for the town was $25,046. About 1.3% of families and 1.4% of the population were below the poverty line, including 2.4% of those under age 18 and none of those age 65 or over.

== Notable people ==
- William Olson, farmer and Wisconsin legislator, was born in the town
