= Charles W. Hutchison =

American politician (1865–1945)

Charles W. Hutchison (February 26, 1865 – July 8, 1945) was a member of the Wisconsin State Assembly and the Wisconsin State Senate.

== Biography ==
Hutchison was born on February 26, 1865, in Mineral Point, Wisconsin. He died on July 8, 1945, in Mineral Point.

His son, David William Hutchison, became a Major General in the United States Air Force.

== Career ==
Hutchison represented the 17th District of the Senate from 1927 to 1930. Previously, he was elected to the Assembly in 1922 and 1924. He was a Republican.
