= Platt Whitman =

American politician (1871–1935)

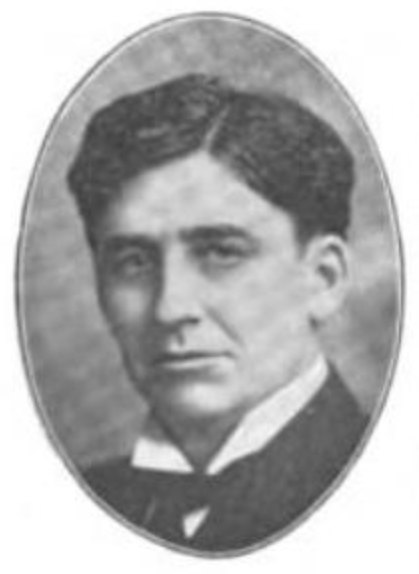

Member of the Wisconsin Senate from the 17th district
- In office January 4, 1915 – January 6, 1919
- Preceded by: Harry C. Martin
- Succeeded by: Oscar R. Olson

Member of the Wisconsin State Assembly from the Iowa district
- In office January 4, 1909 – January 2, 1911
- Preceded by: David J. Morris
- Succeeded by: Thomas M. Evans

Personal details
- Born: February 6, 1871 Dodgeville, Wisconsin, U.S.
- Died: September 11, 1935 (aged 64) Rochester, Minnesota, U.S.
- Resting place: East Side Cemetery, Dodgeville, Wisconsin
- Party: Republican
- Spouse: Maria Elizabeth Jones (died 1905)
- Parent: Joel Whitman (father)
- Education: University of Wisconsin-Madison; University of Wisconsin Law School
- Occupation: Lawyer, banker, politician

Platt Whitman (February 6, 1871 – September 11, 1935) was an American lawyer, banker, and Republican politician. He served four years in the Wisconsin State Senate (1915–1919) and two years in the Assembly (1909–1911), representing Iowa County.

== Biography ==
Whitman was born in Dodgeville, Wisconsin. He graduated from the University of Wisconsin-Madison in 1893 and the University of Wisconsin Law School in 1895.

He died in Rochester, Minnesota, on September 11, 1935, and is interred in the East Side Cemetery in Dodgeville near the Jones-Owens Mausoleum.

His father was Joel Whitman.

== Career ==
Whitman was elected to the Assembly in 1908. Later, he was a member of the Senate from the 17th district from 1915 to 1918. He was a Republican.
