= Plymouth, Rock County, Wisconsin =

Town of Plymouth, Wisconsin
- Town
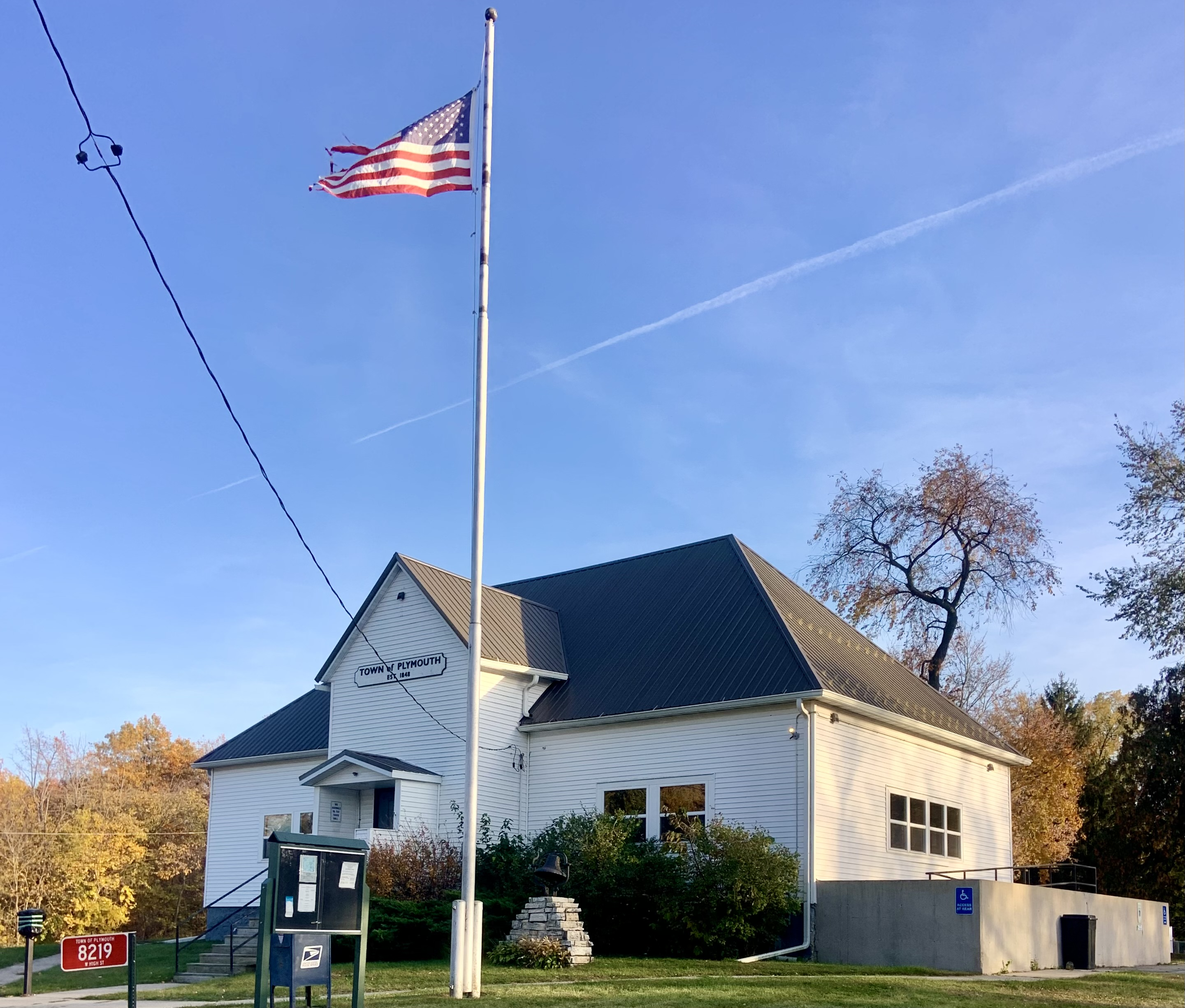
- Town hall

- Location in Rock County and the state of Wisconsin.
- Coordinates: 42°37′56″N 89°10′29″W
- Country: United States
- State: Wisconsin
- County: Rock

Area
  - Total: 35.6 sq mi (92.3 km^{2})
  - Land: 35.6 sq mi (92.3 km^{2})
  - Water: 0 sq mi (0.0 km^{2})
- Elevation: 817 ft (249 m)

Population (2020)
  - Total: 1,245
  - Density: 34.9/sq mi (13.5/km^{2})
- Time zone: UTC-6 (Central (CST))
  - Summer (DST): UTC-5 (CDT)
- Area code: 608
- FIPS code: 55-63675
- GNIS feature ID: 1583946
- Website: https://plymouthrockwi.gov/

The Town of Plymouth is located in Rock County, Wisconsin, United States. The population was 1,245 at the 2020 census. The unincorporated community of Hanover is located in the town.

== Geography ==
According to the United States Census Bureau, the town has a total area of 35.7 square miles (92.3 km^{2}), of which 35.6 square miles (92.3 km^{2}) is land and 0.03% is water.

== Demographics ==
As of the census of 2000, there were 1,270 people, 441 households, and 366 families residing in the town. The population density was 35.6 people per square mile (13.8/km^{2}). There were 454 housing units at an average density of 12.7 per square mile (4.9/km^{2}). The racial makeup of the town was 98.11% White, 0.55% Native American, 0.16% Asian, 0.16% from other races, and 1.02% from two or more races. Hispanic or Latino of any race were 0.55% of the population.

There were 441 households, out of which 36.5% had children under the age of 18 living with them, 71.0% were married couples living together, 6.8% had a female householder with no husband present, and 17.0% were non-families. 13.2% of all households were made up of individuals, and 4.1% had someone living alone who was 65 years of age or older. The average household size was 2.83 and the average family size was 3.06.

In the town, the population was spread out, with 26.1% under the age of 18, 6.3% from 18 to 24, 28.9% from 25 to 44, 27.3% from 45 to 64, and 11.4% who were 65 years of age or older. The median age was 38 years. For every 100 females, there were 101.6 males. For every 100 females age 18 and over, there were 105.9 males.

The median income for a household in the town was $57,969, and the median income for a family was $58,750. Males had a median income of $45,370 versus $24,000 for females. The per capita income for the town was $23,082. About 3.1% of families and 4.4% of the population were below the poverty line, including 3.5% of those under age 18 and 2.9% of those age 65 or over.

== Notable people ==
- Ira E. Inman, farmer and politician, was born in the town

== See also ==
- List of towns in Wisconsin
