= Avon, Wisconsin =

Town of Avon, Wisconsin
- Town
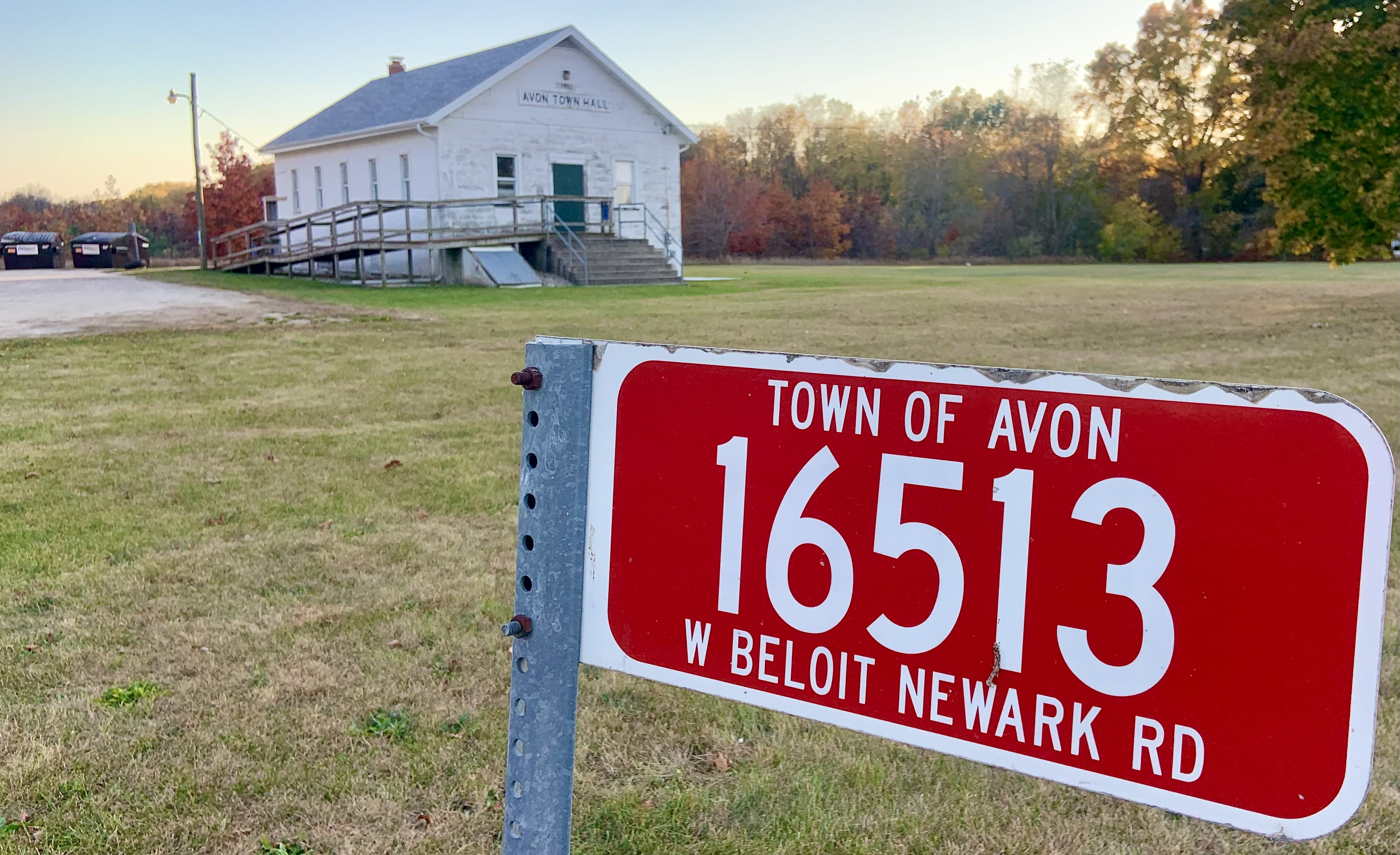
- Town hall

- Location of Avon in Rock County and the state of Wisconsin.
- Coordinates: 42°33′35″N 89°17′41″W
- Country: United States
- State: Wisconsin
- County: Rock

Area
  - Total: 36.1 sq mi (93.6 km^{2})
  - Land: 36.1 sq mi (93.6 km^{2})
  - Water: 0 sq mi (0.0 km^{2})
- Elevation: 761 ft (232 m)

Population (2020)
  - Total: 570
  - Density: 16/sq mi (6.3/km^{2})
- Time zone: UTC-6 (Central (CST))
  - Summer (DST): UTC-5 (CDT)
- Area code: 608
- FIPS code: 55-04100
- GNIS feature ID: 1582738
- Website: townofavonwi.gov

The Town of Avon is located in Rock County, Wisconsin, United States. The population was 570 at the 2020 census.

== Geography ==
According to the United States Census Bureau, the town has a total area of 36.1 square miles (93.6 km^{2}), all land.

== Demographics ==
As of the census of 2000, there were 586 people, 204 households, and 160 families residing in the town. The population density was 16.2 people per square mile (6.3/km^{2}). There were 216 housing units at an average density of 6.0 per square mile (2.3/km^{2}). The racial makeup of the town was 97.78% White, 0.17% Asian, 0.85% from other races, and 1.19% from two or more races. Hispanic or Latino of any race were 1.71% of the population.

There were 204 households, out of which 40.2% had children under the age of 18 living with them, 73.0% were married couples living together, 2.9% had a female householder with no husband present, and 21.1% were non-families. 14.7% of all households were made up of individuals, and 7.8% had someone living alone who was 65 years of age or older. The average household size was 2.87 and the average family size was 3.22.

The population was 28.8% under the age of 18, 5.5% from 18 to 24, 24.9% from 25 to 44, 29.2% from 45 to 64, and 11.6% who were 65 years of age or older. The median age was 39 years. For every 100 females, there were 106.3 males. For every 100 females age 18 and over, there were 109.5 males.

The median income for a household in the town was $47,321, and the median income for a family was $52,750. Males had a median income of $38,846 versus $25,250 for females. The per capita income for the town was $18,770. About 3.9% of families and 9.9% of the population were below the poverty line, including 23.7% of those under age 18 and 4.4% of those age 65 or over.
