= 38th Wisconsin Legislature =

Wisconsin legislative term for 1887-1888

←	37th	39th	→
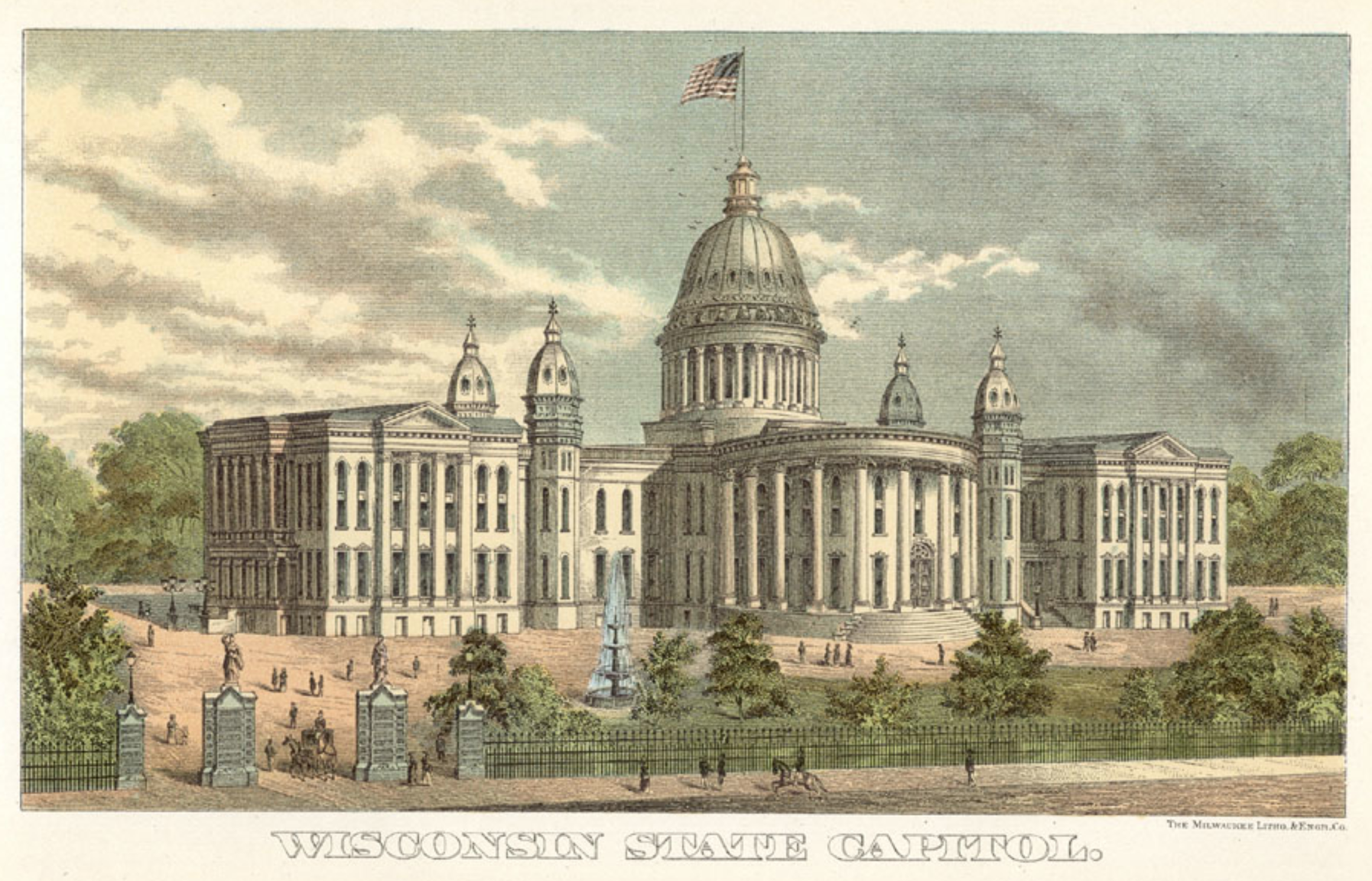
- Wisconsin State Capitol, 1887

Overview
- Legislative body: Wisconsin Legislature
- Meeting place: Wisconsin State Capitol
- Term: January 3, 1887 – January 7, 1889
- Election: November 2, 1886

Senate
- Members: 33
- Senate President: George W. Ryland (R)
- President pro tempore: Charles K. Erwin (R)
- Party control: Republican

Assembly
- Members: 100
- Assembly Speaker: Thomas B. Mills (R)
- Party control: Republican

Sessions
- 1st: January 12, 1887 – April 15, 1887

The Thirty-Eighth Wisconsin Legislature convened from January 12, 1887, to April 15, 1887, in regular session.

Senators representing odd-numbered districts were newly elected for this session and were serving the first two years of a four-year term. Assembly members were elected to a two-year term. Assembly members and odd-numbered senators were elected in the general election of November 2, 1886. Senators representing even-numbered districts were serving the third and fourth year of a four-year term, having been elected in the general election of November 4, 1884.

The governor of Wisconsin during this entire term was Republican Jeremiah M. Rusk, of Vernon County, serving his third two-year term, having won re-election in the 1886 Wisconsin gubernatorial election.

== Major events ==
- January 26, 1887: Philetus Sawyer was re-elected as United States Senator by the Wisconsin Legislature in joint session.
- February 4, 1887: U.S. President Grover Cleveland signed the Interstate Commerce Act of 1887, which was designed to regulate the railroad monopolies.
- February 8, 1887: U.S. President Grover Cleveland signed the Dawes Act, which allowed the federal government to designate private ownership within Native American tribal land.
- April 4, 1887: Susanna M. Salter was elected mayor of Argonia, Kansas, the first female mayor in the United States.
- July 6, 1887: King Kalākaua of Hawaii was forced to sign the 1887 Constitution of the Hawaiian Kingdom, which stripped the monarchy of much of its power and disenfranchised native Hawaiians, Asians, and the poor.
- November 13, 1887: Police in London clashed with Irish nationalist protesters in an incident known as Bloody Sunday.
- January 16, 1888: Wisconsinite William Freeman Vilas became United States Secretary of the Interior.
- March 25, 1888: Opening day of an international Congress for Women's Rights organized by Susan B. Anthony in Washington, D.C. The congress led to formation of the International Council of Women.
- June 15, 1888: German Emperor Frederick III died of cancer after a brief reign. He was succeeded by his son, Wilhelm II.
- November 6, 1888: 1888 United States general election:
  - Benjamin Harrison elected President of the United States, despite losing the popular vote.
  - William D. Hoard elected Governor of Wisconsin.
  - The referendum on a proposed amendment to the Wisconsin Constitution, relating to education, was defeated.

== Major legislation ==
- April 12, 1887: An Act to apportion the state into senate and assembly districts, 1887 Act 461.
- Joint Resolution agreeing to a proposed amendment to section 1, of article 10, of the constitution of the state of Wisconsin, relating to education, 1887 Joint Resolution 4. This was the required second legislative passage of the proposed amendment to the state constitution to update language relating to state education officers. The amendment was put to a referendum in the November 1888 general election, but was defeated by voters.
- Joint Resolution proposing an amendment to the constitution, 1887 Joint Resolution 5. Proposed a new amendment to the Wisconsin Constitution to abolish the separate offices of "chief justice" and "associate justices" of the Wisconsin Supreme Court and instead define all members of the court as "justices" with the most senior justice acting as "chief justice".

== Party summary ==
=== Senate summary ===
Senate partisan composition Democratic: 6 seats People's: 1 seat Independent: 1 seat Republican: 25 seats

	Party (Shading indicates majority caucus)				Total	
	Dem.	Peo.	Ind.	Rep.	Total	Vacant
End of previous Legislature	12	0	0	20	32	1
1st Session	6	1	1	25	33	0
Final voting share	24.24%			75.76%		
Beginning of the next Legislature	6	2	1	24	33	0

=== Assembly summary ===
Assembly partisan composition Democratic: 34 seats People's: 6 seats Independent: 3 seats Republican: 57 seats

	Party (Shading indicates majority caucus)				Total	
	Dem.	Peo.	Ind.	Rep.	Total	Vacant
End of previous Legislature	39	0	0	61	100	0
1st Session	34	5	4	57	100	0
Final voting share	43%			57%		
Beginning of the next Legislature	29	0	0	71	100	0

== Sessions ==
- 1st Regular session: January 12, 1887 – April 15, 1887

== Leaders ==
=== Senate leadership ===
- President of the Senate: George W. Ryland (R)
- President pro tempore: Charles K. Erwin (R)

=== Assembly leadership ===
- Speaker of the Assembly: Thomas B. Mills (R)

== Members ==
=== Members of the Senate ===
Members of the Senate for the Thirty-Eighth Wisconsin Legislature:

Senate partisan representation Democratic: 6 seats People's: 1 seat Independent: 1 seat Republican: 25 seats

Dist.	Counties	Senator	Residence	Party
01	Door, Florence, Forest, Kewaunee, Langlade, Marinette, & Oconto	Edward Scofield	Oconto	Rep.
02	Brown	Charles W. Day	De Pere	Rep.
03	Racine	Henry A. Cooper	Racine	Rep.
04	Crawford & Vernon	Joseph W. Hoyt	Chaseburg	Rep.
05	Milwaukee (Northern Part)	Theodore Fritz	Milwaukee	Peo.
06	Milwaukee (Southern Part)	Julius Wechselberg	Milwaukee	Rep.
07	Milwaukee (Central Part)	Christian Widule	Milwaukee	Rep.
08	Kenosha & Walworth	Walter Maxwell	Somers	Rep.
09	Green Lake, Portage, & Waushara	George Fitch	Berlin	Rep.
10	Waukesha	John Lins	Eagle	Rep.
11	Ashland, Clark, Lincoln, Price, Oneida, Sawyer, Taylor, & Wood	George F. Merrill	Ashland	Rep.
12	Green & Lafayette	James Waddington	Argyle	Rep.
13	Dodge	Charles Pettibone	Juneau	Ind.
14	Juneau & Sauk	David B. Hulburt	Loganville	Rep.
15	Manitowoc	John Carey	Meeme	Dem.
16	Grant	Edward I. Kidd	Millville	Rep.
17	Rock	Allen P. Lovejoy	Janesville	Rep.
18	Fond du Lac (Western Part)	James F. Ware	Fond du Lac	Rep.
19	Winnebago	George H. Buckstaff	Oshkosh	Rep.
20	Sheboygan & Eastern Fond du Lac	Ignatius Klotz	Eden	Dem.
21	Marathon, Shawano, & Waupaca	John E. Leahy	Wausau	Rep.
22	Calumet & Outagamie	William Kennedy	Appleton	Dem.
23	Jefferson	Walter S. Greene	Fort Atkinson	Dem.
24	Barron, Bayfield, Burnett, Douglas, Polk, St. Croix, & Washburn	Joel F. Nason	St. Croix Falls	Rep.
25	Eau Claire, Pepin, & Pierce	William A. Rust	Eau Claire	Rep.
26	Dane	James Conklin	Madison	Dem.
27	Adams, Columbia & Marquette	Levi E. Pond	Westfield	Rep.
28	Iowa & Richland	Norman L. James	Richland Center	Rep.
29	Buffalo & Trempealeau	John W. DeGroff	Alma	Rep.
30	Chippewa & Dunn	George C. Ginty	Chippewa Falls	Rep.
31	La Crosse	Thomas A. Dyson	La Crosse	Rep.
32	Jackson & Monroe	Charles K. Erwin	Tomah	Rep.
33	Ozaukee & Washington	Peter Lochen	Trenton	Dem.

=== Members of the Assembly ===
Members of the Assembly for the Thirty-Eighth Wisconsin Legislature:

Assembly partisan composition Democratic: 34 seats People's: 6 seats Independent: 3 seats Republican: 57 seats

Senate District	County	Dist.	Representative	Party	Residence
27	Adams & Marquette		James W. Perkins	Rep.	New Chester
11	Ashland, Lincoln, Oneida, Price, Sawyer, & Taylor		Henry C. Hetzel	Rep.	Merrill
24	Barron, Bayfield, Burnett, Douglas, & Washburn		Charles S. Taylor	Rep.	Barron
02	Brown	1	Grégoire Dupont	Rep.	Green Bay
02	Brown	2	Patrick Finnerty	Dem.	Wrightstown
29	Buffalo		Joseph V. Jones	Rep.	Urne
22	Calumet & Outagamie	1	Leopold Hammel	Dem.	Appleton
22	Calumet & Outagamie	2	Francis R. Dittmer	Rep.	Seymour
22	Calumet & Outagamie	3	William LaMure	Dem.	Kaukauna
22	Calumet & Outagamie	4	Ernst Schaubs	Dem.	Brillion
30	Chippewa		Thomas J. Cunningham	Dem.	Chippewa Falls
11	Clark		Richard Dewhurst	Ind.	Neillsville
27	Columbia	1	Christian F. Mohr	Rep.	Portage
27	Columbia	2	Samuel Clark	Rep.	Randolph
04	Crawford		Hugh Porter	Rep.	Seneca
26	Dane	1	Michael J. Cantwell	Dem.	Madison
26	Dane	2	Hans Grinde	Rep.	Deforest
26	Dane	3	Richard D. Frost	Rep.	Blooming Grove
26	Dane	4	Henry Powell	Rep.	Mazomanie
26	Dane	5	Richard Terill	Dem.	Dane
13	Dodge	1	Thomas F. Solon	Dem.	Shields
13	Dodge	2	Culver Hooker	Rep.	Waupun
13	Dodge	3	Henry Spiering	Ind.D.	Mayville
13	Dodge	4	John F. Huebner	Ind.D.	Lowell
01	Door		Gustaf Dreutzer	Rep.	Sturgeon Bay
30	Dunn		William Millar	Rep.	Rusk
25	Eau Claire		Syver Brimi	Rep.	Eau Claire
01	Florence & Marinette		James L. Murphy	Rep.	Marinette
18	Fond du Lac	1	George H. Ferris	Rep.	Lamartine
18	Fond du Lac	2	Gaines A. Knapp	Rep.	Fond du Lac
20	Fond du Lac	3	Andrew Schmidlkofer	Dem.	Marshfield
01	Forest, Langlade, & Oconto		Charles Hall	Rep.	Oconto
16	Grant	1	James B. McCoy	Rep.	Platteville
16	Grant	2	Reuben B. Showalter	Rep.	Lancaster
16	Grant	3	Rufus M. Day	Rep.	Mount Hope
12	Green	1	J. C. Zimmerman	Rep.	New Glarus
12	Green	2	John Luchsinger	Rep.	Monroe
09	Green Lake		Charles D. McConnell	Rep.	Brooklyn
28	Iowa	1	George G. Cox	Rep.	Mineral Point
28	Iowa	2	Michael J. Bennett	Rep.	Clyde
32	Jackson		Thomas B. Mills	Rep.	Millston
23	Jefferson	1	Carl R. Feld	Dem.	Watertown
23	Jefferson	2	George Grimm	Rep.	Jefferson
14	Juneau		John Grimshaw	Dem.	Elroy
08	Kenosha		John G. Fleming	Dem.	Randall
01	Kewaunee		Michael C. Haney	Dem.	Ahnapee
31	La Crosse		David Vaughan	Rep.	Burns
12	Lafayette	1	James Scott	Rep.	Darlington
12	Lafayette	2	James W. Freeman	Rep.	Shullsburg
15	Manitowoc	1	Daniel Tracy	Dem.	Liberty
15	Manitowoc	2	Isaac Craite	Dem.	Mishicot
15	Manitowoc	3	Reinhardt Rahr	Dem.	Manitowoc
21	Marathon		Henry Miller	Dem.	Wausau
05	Milwaukee	1	Michael Dunn	Dem.	Milwaukee
07	Milwaukee	2	Gustav Riemer	Peo.	Milwaukee
07	Milwaukee	3	Edward Keogh	Dem.	Milwaukee
07	Milwaukee	4	William J. McElroy	Rep.	Milwaukee
06	Milwaukee	5	Theodore Rudzinski	Peo.	Milwaukee
05	Milwaukee	6	Joseph Meyers	Peo.	Milwaukee
07	Milwaukee	7	Jerome R. Brigham	Rep.	Milwaukee
06	Milwaukee	8	Benjamin C. Garside	Peo.	Milwaukee
05	Milwaukee	9	Henry Vogt	Peo.	Milwaukee
05	Milwaukee	10	John Adam	Peo.	Milwaukee
05	Milwaukee	11	Emerson D. Hoyt	Rep.	Milwaukee
06	Milwaukee	12	George H. Chase	Dem.	Lake
32	Monroe	1	Lewis S. Fisher	Rep.	Sparta
32	Monroe	2	Miles Hineman	Rep.	Tomah
33	Ozaukee		Frederick W. Horn	Ind.D.	Cedarburg
25	Pepin		John Newcomb	Rep.	Pepin
25	Pierce		John A. Murphy	Rep.	Ellsworth
24	Polk		James H. McCourt	Rep.	St. Croix Falls
09	Portage		Jerome Nelson	Rep.	Nelsonville
03	Racine	1	Edward A. Egery	Dem.	Racine
03	Racine	2	Adam Apple	Dem.	Norway
28	Richland		George E. Tate	Dem.	Viola
17	Rock	1	William M. Nye	Rep.	Beloit
17	Rock	2	John Winans	Dem.	Janesville
17	Rock	3	James C. Bartholf	Rep.	Milton
14	Sauk	1	Evan W. Evans	Dem.	Spring Green
14	Sauk	2	Frank Avery	Rep.	Baraboo
21	Shawano		Robert W. Jackson	Rep.	Shawano
20	Sheboygan	1	Wilbur M. Root	Dem.	Sheboygan
20	Sheboygan	2	George W. Spratt	Rep.	Sheboygan Falls
20	Sheboygan	3	Daniel Steuerwald	Dem.	Adell
24	St. Croix		Herman L. Humphrey	Rep.	Hudson
29	Trempealeau		Samuel S. Miller	Rep.	Whitehall
04	Vernon	1	William M. Kingston	Rep.	Chaseburg
04	Vernon	2	Samuel Sloggy	Rep.	Whitestown
08	Walworth	1	Andrew J. Stewart	Rep.	Richmond
08	Walworth	2	James C. Reynolds	Rep.	Lake Geneva
33	Washington	1	James Kenealy	Ind.D.	Erin
33	Washington	2	Frederick C. Schuler	Dem.	Farmington
10	Waukesha		Joseph J. Hadfield	Dem.	Waukesha
21	Waupaca	1	William Masters	Rep.	Weyauwega
21	Waupaca	2	Ambrose S. McDonald	Rep.	Marion
09	Waushara		William B. La Selle	Rep.	Plainfield
19	Winnebago	1	James B. McLeran	Ind.	Oshkosh
19	Winnebago	2	John W. Tobey	Ind.	Neenah
19	Winnebago	3	Frank Challoner	Rep.	Omro
11	Wood		Henry A. Lathrop	Dem.	Marshfield

== Committees ==
=== Senate committees ===
- Senate Committee on Agriculture
- Senate Committee on Assessment and Collection of Taxes
- Senate Committee on Education
- Senate Committee on Enrolled Bills
- Senate Committee on Engrossed Bills
- Senate Committee on Federal Relations
- Senate Committee on Finance, Banks, and Insurance
- Senate Committee on Incorporations
- Senate Committee on the Judiciary
- Senate Committee on Legislative Expenditures
- Senate Committee on Manufacturing and Commerce
- Senate Committee on Military Affairs
- Senate Committee on Privileges and Elections
- Senate Committee on Public Lands
- Senate Committee on Railroads
- Senate Committee on Roads and Bridges
- Senate Committee on State Affairs
- Senate Committee on Town and County Organizations

=== Assembly committees ===
- Assembly Committee on Agriculture – G. G. Cox, chair
- Assembly Committee on Assessment and Collection of Taxes – G. A. Dreutzer, chair
- Assembly Committee on Bills on their Third Reading – Frank Challoner, chair
- Assembly Committee on Cities – J. R. Brigham, chair
- Assembly Committee on Education – J. C. Bartholf, chair
- Assembly Committee on Engrossed Bills – C. E. Hooker, chair
- Assembly Committee on Enrolled Bills – George Spratt, chair
- Assembly Committee on Federal Relations – Hugh Porter, chair
- Assembly Committee on Incorporations – Charles M. Hall, chair
- Assembly Committee on Insurance, Banks, and Banking – G. A. Knapp, chair
- Assembly Committee on the Judiciary – H. L. Humphrey, chair
- Assembly Committee on Legislative Expenditures – Sam S. Miller, chair
- Assembly Committee on Labor and Manufactures – Frank Avery, chair
- Assembly Committee on Lumber and Mining – A. S. McDonald, chair
- Assembly Committee on Medical Societies – H. Powell, chair
- Assembly Committee on Militia – J. B. McCoy, chair
- Assembly Committee on Privileges and Elections – W. B. La Selle, chair
- Assembly Committee on Public Improvements – Samuel Sloggy, chair
- Assembly Committee on Railroads – J. C. Reynolds, chair
- Assembly Committee on Roads and Bridges – R. M. Day, chair
- Assembly Committee on State Lands – C. F. Mohr, chair
- Assembly Committee on State Affairs – W. J. McElroy, chair
- Assembly Committee on Town and County Organization – H. C. Hetzel, chair
- Assembly Committee on Ways and Means – R. W. Jackson, chair

=== Joint committees ===
- Joint Committee on Charitable and Penal Institutions
- Joint Committee on Claims
- Joint Committee on Printing
- Joint Committee on Apportionment of the State

== Employees ==
=== Senate employees ===
- Chief Clerk: Charles E. Bross
  - Assistant Clerk: J. O. Warriner
  - Bookkeeper: Oliver Munson
  - Engrossing Clerk: L. W. Jacobs
  - Enrolling Clerk: E. R. Smith
  - Transcribing Clerk: C. E. Webster
  - Proofreader: M. A. Hoyt
  - Index Clerk: H. S. Ball
  - Clerk for the Judiciary Committee: Thomas Norton
  - Clerk for the Committee on Incorporations: W. E. Webster
  - Clerk for the Committee on Claims: George B. Blair
  - Document Clerk: M. M. Conant
- Sergeant-at-Arms: T. J. George
  - Assistant Sergeant-at-Arms: W. W. Baker
- Postmaster: H. Stone Richardson
  - Assistant Postmaster: John R. Smyth
- Gallery Attendant: Mark W. Baker
- Document Room Attendant: Samuel Chase
- Committee Room Attendants:
  - H. L. Westenhaven
  - J. H. Holcomb
- Doorkeepers:
  - S. N. Knudson
  - Nelson Darling
  - John Dishmaker
  - H. C. Fulton
- Porter: John Malone
- Night Watch: Marcus H. Barnum
- Janitor: F. D. Johnson
- Messengers:
  - Prentice Flint
  - Dexter Baker
  - Julius Seresse
  - Harvey Hulburt
  - Joseph Rupp
  - Ernest Micklist
  - Louis Hammond
  - Frank Bancroft

=== Assembly employees ===
- Chief Clerk: Edwin Coe
  - 1st Assistant Clerk: C. A. Coon
    - 2nd Assistant Clerk: Walter L. Houser
  - Bookkeeper: J. T. Huntington
  - Engrossing Clerk: Egbert Wyman
    - Assistant Engrossing Clerk: Archie McMillan
  - Enrolling Clerk: L. J. Burlingame
    - Assistant Enrolling Clerk: Jos. Albrecht
  - Transcribing Clerk: George W. Currier
    - Assistant Transcribing Clerk: W. J. Egbert
  - Index Clerk: George P. Smith
  - Comparing Clerk: E. A. Charlton
  - Clerk for the Judiciary Committee: S. J. Morse
  - Clerk for the Committee on Enrolled Bills: G. S. Putnam
  - Clerk for the Committee on Engrossed Bills: J. M. Hayden
  - Clerk for the Committee on State Affairs: Robert W. Chapin
  - Clerk for the Committee on Third Reading: C. J. Hicks
  - Document Clerk: E. A. Hanks
  - Custodian of the Engrossing and Enrolling Rooms: J. J. Marshall
- Sergeant-at-Arms: William A. Adamson
  - Assistant Sergeant-at-Arms: M. C. Matson
- Postmaster: C. W. McMillan
  - Assistant Postmaster: G. R. Hall
- Doorkeepers:
  - James Sharp
  - John H. Vivian
  - G. W. Dart
  - D. F. Cleaveland
- Gallery Attendants:
  - Ira S. Vaughn
  - H. H. Lampman
- Committee Room Attendants:
  - V. A. Henwood
  - George Campbell
- Document Room Attendant: C. Schneider
- Porter: A. B. Lynn
- Policeman: R. M. Burke
- Flagman: N. P. Nelson
- Night Watch: George Hanover
- Wash Room Attendant: Lucian H. Palmer
- Messengers:
  - Lewis Olson
  - Willie Gillet
  - M. E. Lynch
  - Gifford Best
  - Fred Willett
  - Anton Peterson
  - Christ Doehring
  - Ralph Norriss
  - Willie Shaver
  - James Whitty
  - Willie Berg
  - Willie Hughes
