= Jacob Elias Friend =

American politician (1857–1912)

Jacob E. Friend
- Born: December 6, 1857; Milwaukee, Wisconsin, USA
- Died: April 20, 1912 (aged 54); Perugia, Umbria, Italy
- Occupations: President (Nordbery Manufacturing Company); Vice president (Friend Brothers Clothing Company); Director (National Exchange Bank in Miwaukee)
- Spouse: Alice Levy
- Children: 3

Member of the Wisconsin House of Representatives from the Milwaukee district
- In office January 1, 1883 – January 3, 1887
- Preceded by: Arthur Bate; Edward Keogh; George P. Harrington; William Lindsay; Carl Zabel; William S. Stanley; Francis J. Borchardt; Arnold Huchting; Charles Fingado; William M. Williams Jr.
- Succeeded by: Michael Dunn; Gustav Riemer; Edward Keogh; William J. McElroy; Theodore Rudzinski; Joseph Meyers; Jerome R. Brigham; Benjamin Charles Garside; Henry Vogt; John Adam; Emerson D. Hoyt; George Chase

Jacob Elias Friend (December 6, 1857 – April 20, 1912) was an American politician, lawyer, and businessman.

Born in Milwaukee, Wisconsin, Friend received his law degree from Columbia Law School and practiced law in Milwaukee, Wisconsin.

Friend was president of the Nordberg Manufacturing Company in 1895 and he was also the vice-president of Friend Brothers Clothing Company, which was owned by his father, Elias Friend, and his uncle, Henry Friend. He was also director of the National Exchange Bank in Milwaukee.

Friend received financial support from Frederick Pabst.

Friend was also involved in a "deal" to merge the largest steam engine companies after the purchase of the Corliss Steam Engine Works by a group of businessmen. Friend served in the Wisconsin State Assembly from 1883 to 1887 as a Republican. Friend died in Perugia, Italy.

Jacob bought land from the estate of Judge Murray F. Tuley on Pine Lake in an area now known as Chenequa, Wisconsin which has archaeological significance for being known as a site for trails and camps of Native American Indians from Prairie Potawatomi and Menomini tribes. The land is located off Muscovy Road.

== Family ==
Friend married Alice Levy on April 29, 1885. They had three children: Robert, Margaret, and James. Robert went on to be president of Nordberg Manufacturing Company.
