= Atlantic 10 Conference baseball awards =

- Awarded for: Coach, Pitcher, Player, Rookie, and Defensive Player of the Year in the Atlantic 10 Conference
- Country: United States

History
- First award: 1988

At the end of each regular season, the Atlantic 10 Conference names major award winners in baseball. It names a Coach, Pitcher, Player, and Rookie of the Year. The Coach of the Year, dating to 1988, is the oldest. Pitcher and Player were added in 1993, Rookie in 1994, and Defensive Player in 2024.

Through the end of 2014, Rhode Island has won the most major awards, with 12. The only other school to win more than ten is George Washington, with 11.

Three players have won more than one of the awards. In 2000, George Washington's Greg Conden was named both Rookie and Pitcher of the Year. Duquesne's B. J. Barns was Rookie of the Year in 1997 and Player of the Year in 1999; Rhode Island's Dan Batz did the same in 2001 and 2004.

== Coach of the Year ==
The Coach of the Year award is presented annually to the conference's most outstanding coach, as voted by the A-10's coaches at the end of each regular season. The award has been presented since 1988.

In 2014, Saint Joseph's head coach Fritz Hamburg received the award for the first time. After tying for 8th and missing the conference tournament in 2013, the Hawks went 35-16 (18-8 A-10) in 2014, setting a program wins record.

Mike Stone of UMass, Fred Hill of Rutgers, Larry Sudbrook of St. Bonaventure, Darin Hendrickson of Saint Louis, and Raphael Cerrato of Rhode Island have each won the award three times, a conference record. Three of those coaches won their awards in consecutive seasons, Stone from 1994 to 1996, Hill from 1991 to 1993, and Cerrato from 2015 to 2016. Only one other coach, Rhode Island's Frank Leoni from 2003 to 2004, has won the award in consecutive years.

George Washington and La Salle are the only schools to have three coaches win the award. The Revolutionaries' (known as Colonials before the 2023 season) John Castleberry won it in 1989, Tom Walter in 1998, and Gregg Ritchie in 2013, and the Explorers' Larry Conti won it in 1999, Scott Googins in 2008, and David Miller in 2021. Two other schools have had two coaches earn the honor: Xavier (John Morrey in 1997 and Scott Googins in 2008) and Rhode Island (Frank Leoni in 2003 and 2004 and Jim Foster in 2011).

=== Winners by season ===
Season	Coach	School	Conf. (Rk.)	Overall
1988	Dale Ramsburg	West Virginia	12-4 (1st, West)	33–17–1
1989	John Castleberry; Skip Wilson	George Washington; Temple	13-3 (1st, West); 11-5 (2nd, East)	30–24; 28-28-1
1990	Dale Ramsburg (2)	West Virginia	12-4 (2nd, West)	33–20
1991	Fred Hill	Rutgers	11-5 (1st, East)	33–24–2
1992	Fred Hill (2)	Rutgers	14-2 (1st, East)	32–17
1993	Fred Hill (3)	Rutgers	14-6 (1st)	38–17
1994	Mike Stone	UMass	19-4 (1st)	31–17
1995	Mike Stone (2)	UMass	19-5 (1st)	38–14
1996	Mike Stone (3)	UMass	15-5 (1st, East)	40–13
1997	John Morrey	Xavier	14-6 (1st, West)	32–26
1998	Tom Walter	George Washington	13-2 (1st, West)	33–18
1999	Larry Conti	La Salle	10-11 (T-2nd, West)	27–29
2000	Larry Sudbrook	St. Bonaventure	13-8 (1st, East)	26–16
2001	Skip Wilson (2)	Temple	15-7 (T-2nd)	27–31
2002	Ron Atkins	Richmond	22-2 (1st, West)	53–13
2003	Frank Leoni	Rhode Island	16-8 (T-1st, East)	26-26
2004	Frank Leoni (2)	Rhode Island	20-4 (1st, East)	35–20–1
2005	Nick Restaino	Fordham	17-7 (2nd, East)	34–21
2006	Larry Sudbrook (2)	St. Bonaventure	18-8 (2nd)	26–19
2007	Loren Hibbs	Charlotte	23-4 (1st)	49–12
2008	Scott Googins	Xavier	19-8 (T-1st)	27–31
2009	Tony Vittorio	Dayton	21-6 (1st)	38–19
2010	Mike Lake	La Salle	14-13 (T-6th)	22–32
2011	Jim Foster	Rhode Island	16-8 (2nd)	31–22
2012	Darin Hendrickson	Saint Louis	17-7(T-1st)	41–18
2013	Gregg Ritchie	George Washington	15-9 (6th)	26–32
2014	Fritz Hamburg	Saint Joseph's	18-8 (2nd)	34–21
2015	Raphael Cerrato	Rhode Island	15-9 (3rd)	26–25–1
2016	Raphael Cerrato (2)	Rhode Island	18-6 (1st)	31–27
2017	Larry Sudbrook (3)	St. Bonaventure	15-8 (3rd)	26–22
2018	Darin Hendrickson (2)	Saint Louis	19-4 (1st)	38–20
2019	Shawn Stiffler	VCU	19-5 (1st)	39–19
2021	David Miller	La Salle	15-9 (T-2nd, North)	32–21
2022	Rucker Taylor	Davidson	20-4 (1st)	43–13
2023	Fritz Hamburg (2)	Saint Joseph's	17-7 (1st)	28–24–1
2024	Darin Hendrickson (3)	Saint Louis	16-8 (1st)	37–16
2025	Raphael Cerrato (3)	Rhode Island	23-8 (1st)	39–20
2026	Fritz Hamburg (3)	Saint Joseph's	25-5 (1st)	35–18

=== By school ===
The following is a table of the schools whose coaches have won the award, along with the year each school joined the conference, the number of times it has won the award, and the years in which it has done so.

School (year joined)	Awards	Seasons
Rhode Island (1981)	6	2003, 2004, 2011, 2015, 2016, 2025
George Washington (1979)	3	1989, 1998, 2013
La Salle (1996/2026) (Note: La Salle dropped baseball after the 2021 season, but will reinstate the sport in the 2026 season.)	3	1999, 2010, 2021
Rutgers (1979) (Note: After the 1995 season, Rutgers left to join the Big East Conference. It moved from there to the American Athletic Conference for the 2014 season only, and since that season has been a member of the Big Ten Conference.)	3	1991, 1992, 1993
St. Bonaventure (1984)	3	2000, 2006, 2017
Saint Joseph's (1983)	3	2014, 2023, 2026
Saint Louis (2006)	3	2012, 2018, 2024
UMass (1979) (Note: After the 2024 season, UMass left to join the Mid-American Conference.)	3	1994, 1995, 1996
Temple (1983) (Note: After the 2013 season, Temple left to join the American Athletic Conference.)	2	1989, 2001
West Virginia (1979) (Note: After the 1995 season, West Virginia left to join the Big East Conference, and joined the Big 12 Conference starting in the 2013 season.)	2	1988, 1990
Xavier (1996) (Note: After the 2013 season, Xavier left to join the Big East Conference.)	2	1997, 2008
Charlotte (2006) (Note: After the 2013 season, Charlotte left to rejoin Conference USA, and it left from there for the American Athletic Conference after the 2023 season.)	1	2007
Davidson (2015)	1	2022
Dayton (1996)	1	2009
Fordham (1996)	1	2005
Richmond (2002)	1	2002
VCU (2013)	1	2019

== Pitcher of the Year ==
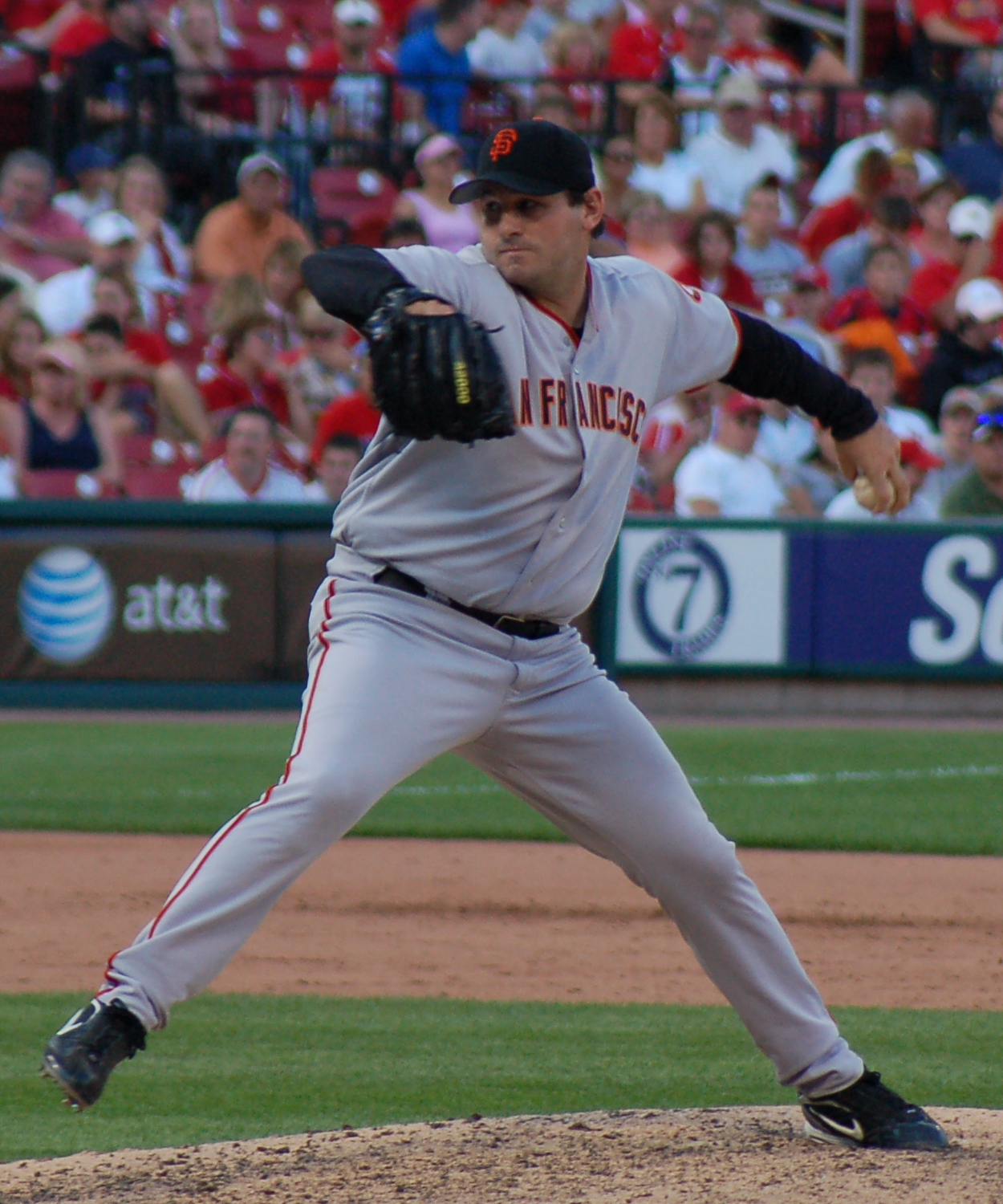
1993 recipient Steve Kline.

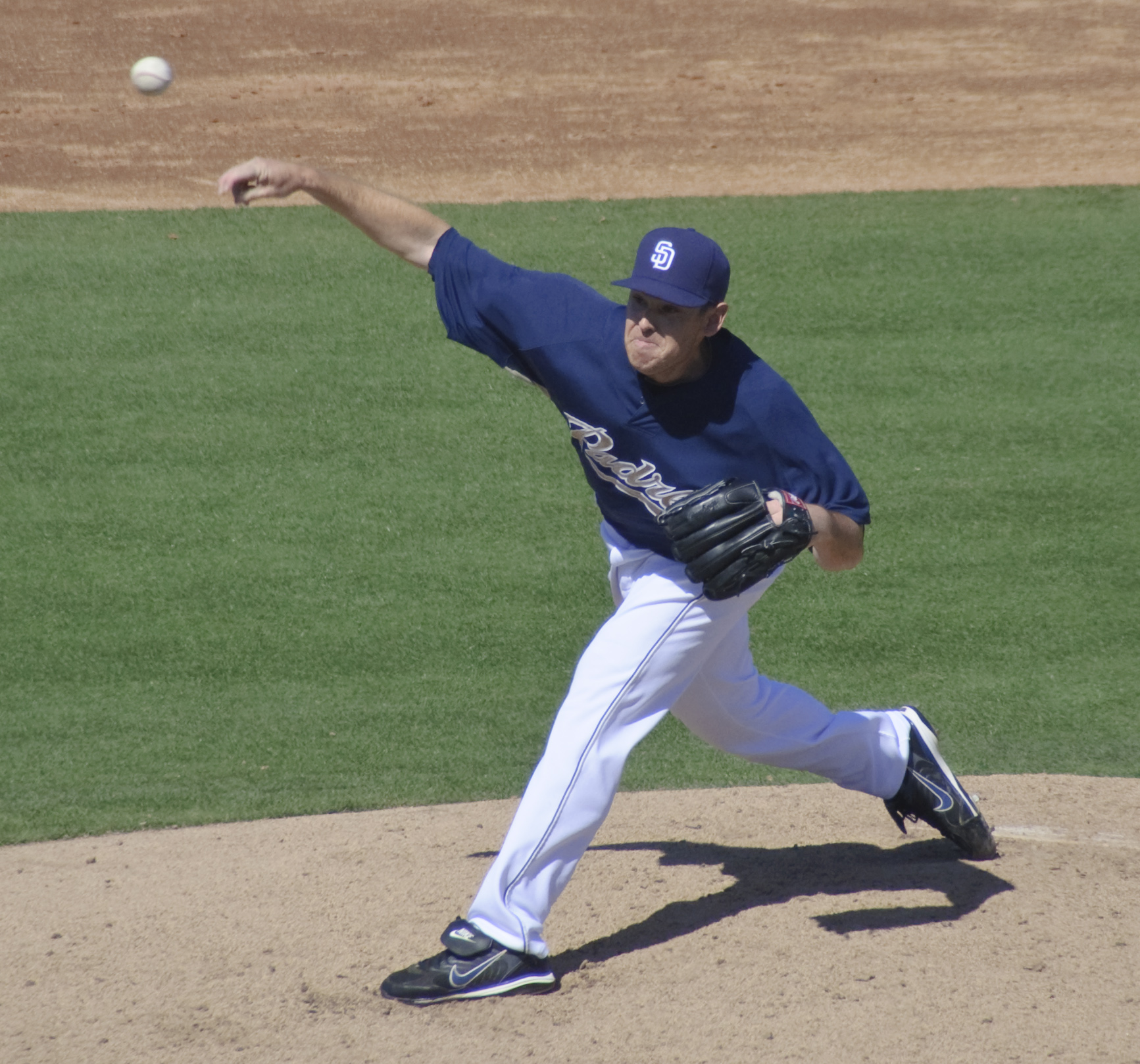
2002 and 2003 recipient Tim Stauffer.

The conference's Pitcher of the Year award is given annually to the best pitcher in the Atlantic 10, as voted by the conference's coaches at the end of the regular season. It was first presented in 1993.

In 2014, Saint Joseph's Jordan Carter received the award. On the regular season, the senior had 10 wins, a 2.19 ERA, and 75 strikeouts. He was selected by the Cleveland Indians in the 22nd round of the 2014 MLB draft.

Richmond's Tim Stauffer and Rhode Island's Tyler Wilson are the only pitcher to win the award twice. Stauffer won it in 2002 and 2003, and Wilson won it in 2015 and 2016. Stauffer, 1993 winner Steve Kline, and 2021 winner Matt Mikulski went on to play in Major League Baseball.

=== Winners by season ===
Below is a table of the award's winners since it was first presented in 1993.

Season	Pitcher	School
1993	Steve Kline	West Virginia
1994	Bill Anderson	George Washington
1995	Jay Murphy	Massachusetts
1996	Josh Bradford	Xavier
1997	Louie Witte	Xavier
1998	Jay Krystofolski	Rhode Island
1999	Peter Moore	Temple
2000	Greg Conden	George Washington
2001	Kyle Johnson	St. Bonaventure
2002	Tim Stauffer	Richmond
2003	Tim Stauffer	Richmond
2004	Zach Zuercher	Rhode Island
2005	Matt Torra	Massachusetts
2006	Steve Holmes	Rhode Island
2007	Adam Mills	Charlotte
2008	Tom Davis	Fordham
2009	Pat Lehman	George Washington
2010	Tim Boyce	Rhode Island
2011	Andrew Smith	Charlotte
2012	Joe Popielarczyk	Massachusetts
2013	Sean Furney	Rhode Island
2014	Jordan Carter	Saint Joseph's
2015	Tyler Wilson	Rhode Island
2016	Tyler Wilson (2)	Rhode Island
2017	Aaron Phillips	St. Bonaventure
2018	Miller Hogan	Saint Louis
2019	John Stankiewicz	Fordham
2021	Matt Mikulski	Fordham
2022	Blake Hely	Davidson
2023	Chad Gartland	George Mason
2024	Nick Wissman	Dayton
2025	Colton Book	Saint Joseph's
2026	Joey Giordano	Richmond

=== By school ===
The following is a table of the schools whose pitchers have won the award, along with the year each school joined the conference, the number of times it has won the award, and the years in which it has done so.

School (year joined)	Awards	Seasons
Rhode Island (1981)	7	1998, 2004, 2006, 2010, 2013, 2015, 2016
Fordham (1996)	3	2008, 2019, 2021
George Washington (1979)	3	1994, 2000, 2009
Richmond (2002)	3	2002, 2003, 2026
Massachusetts (1979) (Note: UMass left to join the Mid-American Conference after the 2025 season.)	3	1995, 2005, 2012
Charlotte (2006) (Note: Charlotte left to join Conference USA after the 2013 season, and joined the American Athletic Conference in advance of the 2024 season.)	2	2007, 2011
St. Bonaventure (1980)	2	2001, 2017
Saint Joseph's (1983)	2	2014, 2025
Xavier (1996) (Note: Xavier left to join the Big East Conference after the 2013 season.)	2	1996, 1997
Davidson (2015)	1	2022
Dayton (1996)	1	2024
George Mason (2014)	1	2023
Saint Louis (2006)	1	2018
Temple (1983) (Note: Temple left to join the American Athletic Conference after the 2013 season.)	1	1995
West Virginia (1979) (Note: West Virginia left to join the Big East Conference after the 1995 season, and has been in the Big 12 Conference since the 2013 season.)	1	1993

== Player of the Year ==
The conference's Player of the Year award is given annually to the best position player in the A-10, as chosen by the conference's coaches at the end of the regular season. It was first presented in 1993.

In 2014, Saint Joseph's outfielder Collin Forgey won the award. In the regular season, he hit .368 and slugged .561 for the Hawks. Two players have won the award twice: Fordham's Bobby Kingsbury in 2001 and 2002 and St. Bonaventure's Brian Pellegrini in 2006 and 2007. Kingsbury, 1996 recipient Kevin Barker, and 2021 recipient Tyler Locklear later played in Major League Baseball.

=== Winners by season ===
Below is a table of the award's winners since it was first presented in 1993.

Season	Pitcher	School
1993	Doug Alongi	Rutgers
1994	Mark Landers	West Virginia
1995	Bill Knight	Massachusetts
1996	Kevin Barker	Virginia Tech
1997	Mike Marchiano	Fordham
1998	Matt Griswold	Virginia Tech
1999	B. J. Barns	Duquesne
2000	Brooks Vogel	Dayton
2001	Bobby Kingsbury	Fordham
2002	Bobby Kingsbury	Fordham
2003	Jim Fasano	Richmond
2004	Dan Batz	Rhode Island
2005	Brad Rosenblat	George Washington
2006	Brian Pellegrini	St. Bonaventure
2007	Brian Pellegrini	St. Bonaventure
2008	Chris Taylor; Derek Mechling	Charlotte; Duquesne
2009	Dan Rhault	Rhode Island
2010	Tom Zebroski	George Washington
2011	Ben Thomas	Xavier
2012	Jeff Roy	Rhode Island
2013	Justin Seager; Mike Vigliarolo	Charlotte; Saint Louis
2014	Collin Forgey	Saint Joseph's
2015	Michael Morman	Richmond
2016	Deon Stafford Jr.	Saint Joseph's
2017	Logan Farrar	VCU
2018	Isaiah Pasteur	George Washington
2019	Nate Fassnacht	George Washington
2021	Tyler Locklear	VCU
2022	Michael Carico	Davidson
2023	Ryan Wilson	Davidson
2024	Brandon Eike	VCU
2025	James Quinn-Irons	George Mason
2026	Blake Primrose	Saint Joseph's

=== By school ===
The following is a table of the schools whose players have won the award, along with the year each school joined the conference, the number of times it has won the award, and the years in which it has done so.

In 2014, Massachusetts pitcher/designated hitter Mike Geannelis won the award. During the summer, he played for the Nashua Silver Knights of the Futures Collegiate Baseball League.

School (year joined)	Awards	Seasons
George Washington (1979)	4	2005, 2010, 2018, 2019
Fordham (1996)	3	1997, 2001, 2002
Rhode Island (1981)	3	2004, 2009, 2012
Saint Joseph's (1983)	3	2014, 2016, 2026
VCU (2013)	3	2017, 2021, 2024
Charlotte (2006) (Note: Charlotte left after the 2013 season to rejoin Conference USA, and moved from there to the American Athletic Conference after the 2023 season.)	2	2008, 2013
Davidson (2015)	2	2022, 2023
Duquesne (1979) (Note: Duquesne did not play in the A-10 in 1992, then cut its program after the 2010 season.)	2	1999, 2008
Richmond (2002)	2	2003, 2015
St. Bonaventure (1980)	2	2006, 2007
Virginia Tech (1996) (Note: Virginia Tech left after the 2000 season to join the Big East Conference. Tech moved from there to the Atlantic Coast Conference after the 2005 season.)	2	1996, 1998
Dayton (1996)	1	2000
George Mason (2014)	1	2025
Massachusetts (1979) (Note: UMass left to join the Mid-American Conference after the 2025 season.)	1	1995
Rutgers (1979) (Note: Rutgers left after the 1995 season to join the Big East Conference. When the Big East split in 2013, Rutgers remained in the football-sponsoring portion that became the American Athletic Conference for a single season in 2014 before moving to the Big Ten Conference.)	1	1993
Saint Louis (2006)	1	2013
West Virginia (1979) (Note: West Virginia left after the 1995 season to join the Big East Conference, and moved from there to the Big 12 Conference after the 2012 season.)	1	1994
Xavier (1996) (Note: Xavier left after the 2013 season to join the Big East Conference.)	1	2011

== Rookie of the Year ==
The Rookie of the Year award is annually presented to the conference's best freshman, as chosen by the league's coaches at the end of the season. It was first presented in 1994. Both pitchers and position players are eligible.

=== Winners by season ===
Below is a table of the award's winners since it was first presented in 1994.

Season	Pitcher	School
1994	Jeff Rojik	Duquesne
1995	Ryan LaMattina	St. Bonaventure
1996	Tom Stein	Fordham
1997	B. J. Barns	Duquesne
1998	Pat Pinkman	Virginia Tech
1999	Jason Bush	Virginia Tech
2000	Greg Conden	George Washington
2001	Dan Batz	Rhode Island
2002	Jay Johnson	Xavier
2003	Tom Shanley	George Washington
2004	Anthony Smith	George Washington
2005	Cory Riordan	Fordham
2006	Aaron Bray	Charlotte
2007	Matt Zielinski	Richmond
2008	Corey Shaylor	Charlotte
2009	Cameron Hobson	Dayton
2010	Alex Alemann	Saint Louis
2011	Tyler Barnette	Charlotte
2012	Zak Sterling	Richmond
2013	Tanner Stanley	Richmond
2014	Mike Geannelis	Massachusetts
2015	Tyler Wilson	Rhode Island
2016	Michael Dailey	VCU
2017	Paul Witt	VCU
2018	Jake Mackenzie	Fordham
2019	Noah Levin; Tatem Levins	George Washington; La Salle
2021	Tyler Locklear	VCU
2022	Ryan Feczko	Davidson
2023	Jordan Jaffe	Richmond
2024	David Mendez	Dayton
2025	Jacob Lee	VCU
2026	Evan Wilson	Richmond

=== By school ===
The following is a table of the schools whose players have won the award, along with the year each school joined the conference, the number of times it has won the award, and the years in which it has done so.

School (year joined)	Awards	Seasons
Richmond (2002)	5	2007, 2012, 2013, 2023, 2026
VCU (2013)	4	2016, 2017, 2021, 2025
Charlotte (2006) (Note: Charlotte left after the 2013 season to rejoin Conference USA, and moved from there to the American Athletic Conference after the 2023 season.)	3	2006, 2008, 2011
George Washington (1979)	3	2000, 2003, 2004
Dayton (1996)	2	2009, 2025
Duquesne (1979) (Note: Duquesne did not play in the Atlantic 10 in 1992, then cut its program after the 2010 season.)	2	1994, 1997
Fordham (1996)	2	1996, 2005
Rhode Island (1981)	2	2001, 2015
Virginia Tech (1996) (Note: Virginia Tech left after the 2000 season to join the Big East Conference.)	2	1998, 1999
Davidson (2015)	1	2022
Massachusetts (1979) (Note: UMass left to join the Mid-American Conference after the 2025 season.)	1	2014
St. Bonaventure (1980)	1	1995
Saint Louis (2006)	1	2010
Xavier (1996) (Note: Xavier left after the 2013 season to join the Big East Conference.)	1	2002

== Defensive Player of the Year ==
The Defensive Player of the Year award is annually presented to the conference's best defensive player, as chosen by the league's coaches at the end of the season. It was first presented in 2024.

=== Winners by season ===
Below is a table of the award's winners since it was first presented in 2024.

Season	Pitcher	School
2024	Aaron Whitley	Richmond
2025	Ethan Sitzman	Saint Louis
2026	Reece Moroney	Rhode Island

=== By school ===
The following is a table of the schools whose players have won the award, along with the year each school joined the conference, the number of times it has won the award, and the years in which it has done so.

School (year joined)	Awards	Seasons
Rhode Island (1981)	1	2026
Richmond (2002)	1	2024
Saint Louis (2006)	1	2025
