= Edward Keogh =

American politician (1835–1898)

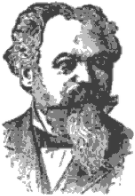

37th Speaker of the Wisconsin State Assembly
- In office January 11, 1893 – January 7, 1895
- Preceded by: James J. Hogan
- Succeeded by: George B. Burrows

Member of the Wisconsin Senate from the 6th district
- In office January 6, 1862 – January 4, 1864
- Preceded by: Michael Egan
- Succeeded by: Hugh Reynolds

Member of the Wisconsin State Assembly from the Milwaukee 1st district
- In office January 2, 1893 – January 7, 1895
- Preceded by: Humphrey J. Desmond
- Succeeded by: Henry Schooley Dodge

Member of the Wisconsin State Assembly from the Milwaukee 3rd district
- In office January 3, 1887 – January 2, 1893
- Preceded by: Michael P. Walsh
- Succeeded by: Gustav J. Jeske
- In office January 3, 1876 – January 1, 1883
- Preceded by: William J. Kershaw
- Succeeded by: Michael P. Walsh
- In office January 2, 1860 – January 6, 1862
- Preceded by: Thomas H. Eviston
- Succeeded by: George K. Gregory

Personal details
- Born: May 5, 1835 County Cavan, Ireland, UK
- Died: November 29, 1898 (aged 63) Milwaukee, Wisconsin, U.S.
- Resting place: Calvary Cemetery, Milwaukee
- Party: Democratic
- Occupation: Printer, politician

Edward Keogh (May 5, 1835 – December 1, 1898) was an Irish American immigrant, printer, Democratic politician, and pioneer settler of Milwaukee, Wisconsin. He served 17 years in the Wisconsin State Assembly between 1860 and 1895, representing Milwaukee's 3rd ward, and was the 37th speaker of the Assembly. He also served two years in the State Senate.

== Early life ==
Edward Keogh was born in County Cavan, Ireland, on May 5, 1835. (Note: The National Cyclopaedia (1895) gave his DOB as January 22, 1835, but the Wisconsin blue books all agree on May 5, 1835, as well as his obituaries in 1898.) His parents emigrated to Utica, New York, in 1841, then relocated to Milwaukee one year later. He was educated in public schools, and learned the printing trade.

== Legislative service ==
Keogh first became a member of the Assembly in 1860 to succeed Independent Thomas H. Eviston in representing the 3rd Milwaukee County district (the 3rd Ward of the City of Milwaukee); and was assigned to the standing committee on enrolled bills. He was re-elected for 1861, and was assigned to the standing committees on incorporations, on privileges and elections, and on ways and means; and to the joint committee on printing.

For 1862, he was elected to the Senate for the Sixth District (the 3rd, 4th, 5th, and 6th Wards of Milwaukee, and the Towns of Wauwatosa, Greenfield, Lake, Oak Creek and Franklin), becoming the youngest member of that body at the age of 28. He was assigned to the committees on legislative expenditures, on internal improvements, and on engrossed bills. He was re-elected for 1863, and returned to the joint committee on printing as a Senate member. He was succeeded in the Senate in 1864 by fellow Democrat Hugh Reynolds.

== After the Senate ==
In 1867 he established his own printing company as the senior partner in the firm of Keogh & Schroeder. According to his official biography of 1876, "He twice received the Democratic nomination for the Assembly in the first ward of Milwaukee, but 'was beaten through railway influence' by a small majority at each election". One of these was presumably the election of 1869, which he lost to Republican Stephen Harrison by 45 votes.

In 1875, he was again elected to the Assembly from his old (third) district, with 583 votes to 339 for James McGrath, who had served several terms as a Democrat but had become an independent. He returned to the committee on incorporations, and was put on the joint committee on apportionments. He was re-elected in 1877 (1,032 votes to 382 for Republican E. Rosenkranz); and 1878 (642 votes to 191 for John Meinecke (running as both Republican and Greenbacker). In 1879 he defeated a fellow Democrat, ex-Assemblyman and Senator Patrick Walsh; was unopposed in 1880; in 1881 received 1,043 votes to 396 for Republican J. M. Connolly; in 1882 polled 695 votes to 61 for Republican B. Farrell.

In 1882 he ran for the Seventh District Senate seat that had been held by Republican Edward B. Simpson, which included his own Third Ward and another (the 4th) which had been in his old Senate district; he lost to Republican William Stillman Stanley Jr., who received 2,449 votes to 1,662 for Keogh and 1,655 for another Democrat, John S. George. His Assembly seat was taken by fellow printer Michael P. Walsh, President and nominee of the Milwaukee Trades Assembly, a labor federation which was an antecedent to Wisconsin's Union Labor Party.

== Again in the Assembly ==
In 1886, he reclaimed his old seat in the Assembly, which had been held for two terms by Michael Walsh, with 703 votes to 308 for Populist P. J. Reilley and 206 for Republican R. G. Owens. He was re-elected in 1888, with 1,177 votes to 429 votes for Edward J. Kelly, of the Union Labor Party; and in 1890, by 962 votes, to 85 for Republican William Gunnis. Milwaukee County assembly districts were all changed before the 1892 election; Keogh was elected to the new 1st Milwaukee County district (the third and seventh wards of Milwaukee), drawing 1,698 votes to 1,420 for Republican Albert E. Smith and 40 for Populist Charles Hambitzer. Keogh was elected speaker of the Forty-First assembly on January 10, 1893. He was not a candidate for re-election in 1894, and was succeeded by Republican Henry Schooley Dodge.

Edward Keogh died at his home in Milwaukee on November 29, 1898, and was buried at Calvary Cemetery.

== Notes ==
Wisconsin State Assembly
Preceded by Thomas H. Eviston	Member of the Wisconsin State Assembly from the Milwaukee 3rd district January 2, 1860 – January 6, 1862	Succeeded by George K. Gregory
Preceded by William J. Kershaw	Member of the Wisconsin State Assembly from the Milwaukee 3rd district January 3, 1876 – January 1, 1883	Succeeded by Michael P. Walsh
Preceded by Michael P. Walsh	Member of the Wisconsin State Assembly from the Milwaukee 3rd district January 3, 1887 – January 2, 1893	Succeeded by Gustav J. Jeske
Preceded by Humphrey J. Desmond	Member of the Wisconsin State Assembly from the Milwaukee 1st district January 2, 1893 – January 7, 1895	Succeeded by Henry Schooley Dodge
Preceded by James J. Hogan	Speaker of the Wisconsin State Assembly; January 11, 1893 – January 7, 1895	Succeeded by George B. Burrows
Wisconsin Senate
Preceded by Michael Egan	Member of the Wisconsin Senate from the 6th district January 6, 1862 – January 4, 1864	Succeeded by Hugh Reynolds
