= Oklahoma House Bill 1674 (2021) =

2021 passed Oklahoma legislative bill

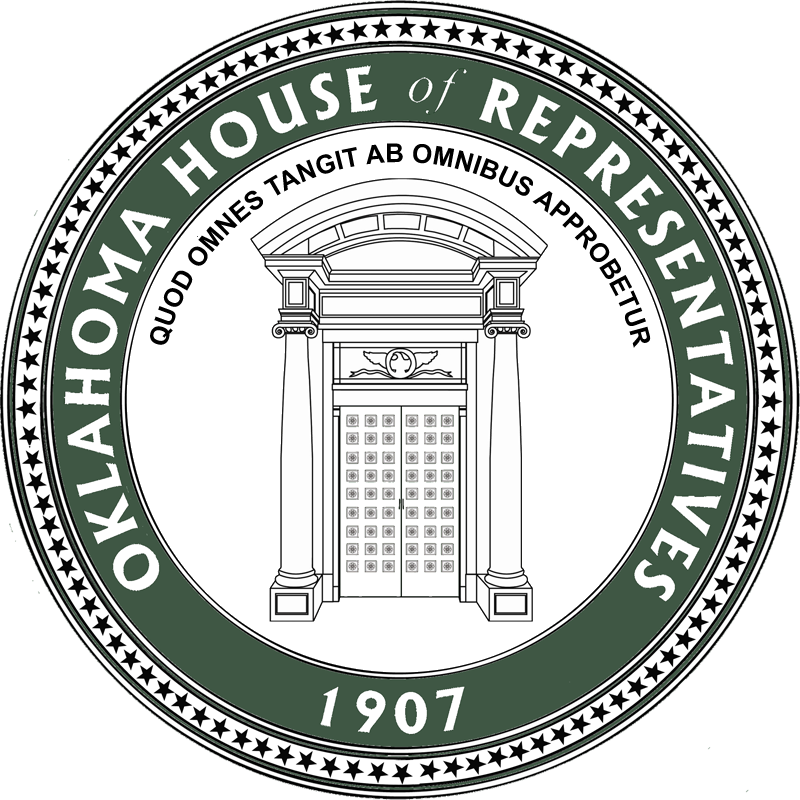

Oklahoma Legislature
- Long title: An Act relating to crimes and punishments; amending 21 O.S. 2011, Section 1312, which relates to penalties for rioting; updating language; making certain acts unlawful; providing penalties; providing liability provision for certain damages; defining term; providing an exemption from criminal or civil liability for motor vehicle operators under certain circumstances; providing penalties for certain organizations; providing for codification; and providing an effective date.
- Citation: O.K. Legis. Assemb. H.B. 1674. Reg. Sess. (2021)
- Territorial extent: Oklahoma
- Passed by: Oklahoma House of Representatives
- Passed: March 9, 2021
- Passed by: Oklahoma Senate
- Passed: April 14, 2021
- Signed by: Kevin Stitt (R)
- Signed: April 21, 2021
- Effective: November 1, 2021

Legislative history

Initiating chamber: Oklahoma House of Representatives
- Bill title: House Bill 1674
- Introduced by: Kevin West (R–54)
- First reading: February 1, 2021
- Second reading: February 2, 2021
- Third reading: March 9, 2021

Revising chamber: Oklahoma Senate
- Bill title: House Bill 1674
- Member(s) in charge: Rob Standridge (R–15)
- First reading: March 10, 2021
- Second reading: March 17, 2021
- Third reading: April 14, 2021

Amends
- Okla. Stat. tit. 21 (2019)

Summary
- Changes chain of custody for people convicted of rioting, makes illegal obstruction of roads a misdemeanor, grants civil and criminal immunity to motorists who unintentionally harm someone while fleeing a riot, fines organizations that conspire with someone who committed a riot-related crime
- Status: Not fully in force

Oklahoma House Bill 1674 (also known as HB1674) is a passed 2021 legislative bill in the U.S. state of Oklahoma that made illegal obstruction of roads (Note: HB1674 defines obstruction as "to render impassable or to render passage unreasonably inconvenient or hazardous.") a misdemeanor, granted civil and criminal immunity to motorists who unintentionally harm someone while fleeing a riot, (Note: The bill refers to a riot as defined in Oklahoma Statute §21-1311, which states: "Any use of force or violence, or any threat to use force or violence if accompained [sic] by the immediate power of execution, by three or more persons acting together and without the authority of law, is a riot.") and fined organizations that conspire with someone who committed a riot-related crime. HB1674 was introduced in response to a Black Lives Matter protest in Tulsa in May 2020 where a pickup truck drove through protestors on I-244, seriously injuring three. The bill was first read in February 2021, passing the Oklahoma House of Representatives in March and the Oklahoma Senate in April. Governor Kevin Stitt signed the bill into law in April. Co-sponsors of HB1674 assert that the bill would provide protections for people fleeing from riots, while detractors claim that the bill curtails First Amendment rights, particularly freedom of speech and freedom of assembly.

The Oklahoma State Conference of the NAACP filed a complaint on August 30, 2021, then in September and October 2021, sought an injunction against the enactment of the law, which was due to go into effect on November 1, 2021. On October 27, 2021, U.S. federal district judge Robin J. Cauthron granted a temporary injunction. In March 2022, an answering brief was filed in NAACP v. O'Connor in the United States District Court for the Western District of Oklahoma, where it is still under review.

== Provisions ==
HB1674 contains three main provisions. The first provision amends existing Oklahoma law concerning riots, remanding people convicted of rioting to the custody of the Oklahoma Department of Corrections rather than directly sending them to the Oklahoma State Penitentiary. Persons who illegally obstruct roads, either by impeding traffic, physically blocking vehicles, or "endangering the safe movement of motor vehicles or pedestrians", would be guilty of a misdemeanor punishable by a US$100 to US$5,000 fine or imprisonment in a county jail for up to one year. They would also be liable for any damages resulting from their obstruction.

The second provision introduces a new law which grants civil and criminal immunity to a motorist who unintentionally injures or kills someone while fleeing a riot, had "reasonable belief that fleeing was necessary to protect the motor vehicle operator from serious injury or death", and was driving with "due care" at the time of the incident.

The last provision introduces a new law that would fine an organization found to have conspired with someone who committed a riot-related crime (Note: The bill references crimes defined in Oklahoma Statutes §21-1311 through §21-1320.5, and §21-1320.10, all of which mention riot-related activity as a punishable offense.) ten times the fine for that crime.

== Background ==
In May 2020, Derek Chauvin, a police officer, murdered George Floyd in Minneapolis, Minnesota; Chauvin and three other officers were arresting Floyd for allegedly using counterfeit money to purchase cigarettes. Protests against racism and police brutality broke out in response across the United States and internationally. The majority of demonstrations in the United States were peaceful; (Note: In October 2020, the Washington Post analyzed 7,305 protests from May and June, finding that "96.3 percent of events involved no property damage or police injuries, and in 97.7 percent of events, no injuries were reported among participants, bystanders or police." An analysis of 7,750 protests by the Princeton University–Armed Conflict Location & Event Data Project joint project US Crisis Monitor found that 93% were nonviolent.) some protests resulted in property damage, vandalism, or bodily harm. In many cases, police attacked and harmed protestors and journalists. Some protestors occupied roads and highways, blocking traffic. Some motorists have driven through crowds of protestors, some of whom were injured or killed. Following the demonstrations, Republican legislators in many states, including Oklahoma, have sponsored and supported legislation that restricts protesting and the right to assemble under various conditions.

HB1674 was introduced in response to an incident in Tulsa in May 2020, where a pickup truck towing a horse trailer drove through Black Lives Matter protestors on I-244, seriously injuring three. The Tulsa County District Attorney's Office declined to press criminal charges against the driver, citing the truck's occupants' "immediate fear for their safety". District Attorney Steve Kunzweiler said that "several people in the crowd had attacked the vehicle with the driver's children inside".

== History ==
HB1674 was authored by state Representative Kevin West (R–54) and was first read in the Oklahoma House of Representatives on February 1, 2021. Following its second reading on February 2, the bill was referred to the Administrative Rules Committee. The measure was referred to the Criminal Justice and Corrections Committee after being withdrawn from the Administrative Rules Committee on February 9. HB1674 was amended by the committee and passed 3–1 on March 1; state Senator Rob Standridge (R–15) was added as principal Senate co-author. The bill passed the House 79–18 with 4 excuses on March 9 following its third reading, and was engrossed, signed, and sent to the Oklahoma Senate on March 10.

HB1674 was first read in the Senate on March 10. The bill was referred to the Public Safety Committee and the Appropriations Committee on March 17 following its second reading. The bill passed the Public Safety Committee 8–1 on March 22 and was referred to the Appropriations Committee, who passed it 15–4 on March 31. HB1674 passed the Senate 38–10 on April 14 following its third reading; the engrossed version was signed and sent back to the House, which signed it the next day.

The bill was sent to the governor, Kevin Stitt, on April 15, who signed it into law on April 21. Around 35 demonstrators protesting against HB1674 entered the state capitol on the 21st; they entered the House chamber, but were unable to enter the Senate chamber, whose doors had been locked. The protestors were escorted out of the House gallery after they began yelling at lawmakers on the floor.

HB1674 was set to take effect on November 1, 2021, but is currently the subject of NAACP v. O'Connor to determine if the law will go into effect.

== Reactions ==
Bill author Kevin West and other co-sponsors of HB1674 asserted that the bill would provide protections for people fleeing from riots. Representative Kevin McDugle (R–12) said he supported the right to peacefully protest, but asserted that the designation did not apply to demonstrations where "anyone impedes on the freedoms of others", and that the bill would help people protect themselves when threatened. Senator Rob Standridge said the bill "sets a high bar" because "the harm must be unintentional... and the vehicle occupants must feel like they are in imminent danger". Standridge said that prosecutors might not always decline to press charges, like what happened in Tulsa in May 2020 after a pickup truck towing a horse trailer severely injured protestors on Interstate 244: "this bill will protect innocent people trapped by a rioting mob." Governor Kevin Stitt said that the bill sent a message "that rioters who threaten law abiding citizens' safety will not be tolerated. I remain unequivocally committed to protecting every Oklahoman's First Amendment right to peacefully protest as well as their right to feel safe in their community".

Critics of HB1674 have charged that the bill curtails First Amendment rights, particularly freedom of speech and freedom of assembly. Nicole McAfee, the policy director for the American Civil Liberties Union's Oklahoma chapter said the bill would have a chilling effect on free speech and protest. McAfee claimed the bill is part of an "anti-freedom agenda" that centers "power, order, and white supremacy over the rights, liberties, and lives of Oklahomans, especially Black and Indigenous Oklahomans". The government affairs director for the Council on American–Islamic Relations's Oklahoma chapter asserted that the bill is "meant to discourage Oklahomans from exercising their constitutional right to peaceful protest". State Representative Emily Virgin (D–44) said that she wished "her Republican colleagues would focus on the underlying issues of police brutality and systemic racism instead of seeking ways to punish protesters."

== See also ==
- George Floyd protests
- George Floyd protests in Oklahoma
- List of vehicle-ramming incidents during George Floyd protests
- Traffic obstruction
