= William Knight =

William, Bill, or Billy Knight may refer to:

== Arts and entertainment ==
- William Frederick Knight (1933–2022), American voice actor
- William Henry Knight (1823–1863), British painter
- Billy Knight (film), 2025 American drama film

== Politics ==
- William Knight (died 1622), member of parliament (MP) for Hythe
- Bill Knight (born 1947), former Canadian member of parliament and financial executive
- William J. Knight (1929–2004), X-15 pilot and U.S. politician
- William M. Knight (1837–1910), American politician and merchant from Maryland
- William W. Knight (politician) (1913–1987), Pennsylvania politician
- William Knight (Wisconsin politician) (1843–1941), Wisconsin legislator and orchardman
- William Grills Knight (1839–1903), mayor of Albany, Western Australia

== Sports ==
- William Knight (fighter) (born 1988), American mixed martial arts (MMA) fighter
- Billy Knight (born 1952), American basketball player and executive in the NBA who went to college at Pittsburgh
- Billy Knight (basketball, born 1979) (1979–2018), American basketball player who went to college at UCLA
- William Knight (volleyball) (born 1964), Canadian volleyball player
- Bill Knight (boxer) (born 1951), British Olympic boxer
- Billy Knight (tennis) (1935–2026), British tennis player
- William Knight (footballer), English football goalkeeper for Southampton (1911–1913)
- Will Knight (rugby union) (born 2007), English rugby union player
- Bill Knight (baseball), American baseball player

== Others ==
- Billy Knight (criminal) (1943–1978), Canadian criminal
- William Angus Knight (1836–1916), British writer, professor, and philosopher
- William Bruce Knight (1786–1845), Dean of Llandaff
- William Knight (architect) (1840–1923), architect in Nottingham
- William Knight (pirate) (fl. 1684–1689), English buccaneer
- William Knight (martyr) (1572–1596), martyred in 1596
- William Knight (bishop) (1475–1547), member of the court of Henry VIII, and Bishop of Bath and Wells
- William W. Knight (publisher) (1909–1981), lawyer, state legislator, publisher of The Oregon Journal
- William James Knight (1837–1916), American soldier and Medal of Honor recipient
- Will Knight, farmer and owner of Knight's Spider Web Farm

== See also ==
- William C. Knights (1917–1973), New York assemblyman
- William Nye (disambiguation)
- Bill Nigh (disambiguation)
