= Senator Kershaw =

Senator Kershaw may refer to:

- Joseph B. Kershaw (1822–1894), South Carolina State Senate
- William J. Kershaw (died 1883), Wisconsin State Senate
