= William Nye =

William Nye may refer to:

- Bill Nye (William Sanford Nye, born 1955), American science educator, comedian, television host and mechanical engineer
- Will Nye, American television actor in Murder, She Wrote
- William Foster Nye (1824–1910), businessman who founded Nye Lubricants in 1844
- William B. Nye, former member of the 107th and 108th Ohio General Assembly
- William M. Nye (1829–1905), member of the Wisconsin State Assembly
- William Nye (official) (born 1966), Secretary-General of the Archbishops' Council
- William Nigh (1881–1955), American filmmaker, sometimes credited as "William Nye"

== See also ==
- William Knight (disambiguation)
- Bill Nye (disambiguation)
- Bill Nigh (disambiguation)
- Bill Nighy, English actor
