= Michael P. Walsh (politician) =

American politician (1838–1919)

Michael P. Walsh (August 25, 1838 - April 2, 1919) was an American printer and labor union activist from Milwaukee, Wisconsin who held various local elected offices, as well as serving two terms as a member of the Wisconsin State Assembly from Milwaukee, initially as the nominee of the Milwaukee Trades Assembly, a labor federation which was also an antecedent to that state's Union Labor Party; but then was re-elected as a Democrat.

== Background ==
Walsh was born in Castlebar, County Mayo, Ireland on August 25, 1838; came to Wisconsin in about the year 1842 with his family and settled at Milwaukee, where he received a common school education, beginning his printing education as an apprentice printer in 1851 at the Milwaukee Sentinel. He left Milwaukee in 1859, and later described himself with "has lived and worked in all the principal cities of the country."

== American Civil War ==
He joined the Union Army as a private in Company E of the 49th New York Volunteer Infantry in June, 1861, rising to orderly sergeant. With the Army of the Potomac his unit participated in battles which included Young's Mill, Yorktown, Williamsburg, Mechanicsville, Fair Oaks, Gaines's Mill, Savage's Station, Malvern Hill, Second Bull Run, South Mountain, Antietam, Fredericksburg, Williamsport, Gettysburg, Mine Run, Wilderness, Cold Harbor, Petersburg and others. Walsh was taken prisoner during operations against the Welden Railroad shortly prior to the expiration of his term of enlistment and was a prisoner at Belle Isle, Libby Prison, Andersonville, Savannah, Castle Pinckney and Florence Stockade, before being exchanged and returned to Annapolis, Indiana, where he was honorably discharged May 5, 1865. At some point after this, he spent eight years working at the Wisconsin State Journal in Madison.

== State Assembly ==
When first elected to the Assembly, he was president of International Typographical Union Local 23 and of the Milwaukee Trades Assembly. He had been a member of the Milwaukee Common Council several times, and served as a delegate to a number of conventions (such as the 1881 national convention of the American Federation of Labor, where he represented the Assembly rather than the ITU). He was elected in 1882 from the 3rd Milwaukee County district (the 3rd Ward of the City of Milwaukee) as the candidate of the Trades Assembly, with 573 votes against 437 for Democrat M. G. Dullea and 12 for Republican A. F. Graham (Democratic incumbent Edward Keogh was running for the Wisconsin State Senate). Walsh was assigned to the joint committee on printing

He was re-elected in 1884 as a Democrat, winning 1,012 votes to 543 for Republican James McManus and 5 for Prohibitionist J. A. Hibbard. Fellow Trades' Assembly Assemblyman Daniel Hooker was re-elected that same year as a "Democratic Trades' Assembly" candidate, indicating some kind of tacit arrangement in those districts, although a Union Labor candidate ran for Congress in Milwaukee against Democrat Peter V. Deuster that year.) He remained on the Printing Committee.

During his time in the Assembly, Walsh introduced a bill which would require all prison-made goods to be plainly labeled, and another abolishing the leasing of prisoners as contract labor.

Walsh did not run for re-election in 1886, and the seat was reclaimed by Democrat Edward Keogh once more.

== After the Assembly ==
In 1885 he went to work as a tax collector for the Internal Revenue Bureau. In 1890, Walsh was elected to a single two-year term as Sheriff of Milwaukee County. He was active in the Grand Army of the Republic Afterwards, he returned to work as a printer, and again became president of Local 23. He remained active in the union, serving as a delegate to the international convention of that body in Detroit, where it was decided to hold the next year's convention in Milwaukee. At the 1900 convention in Milwaukee, he chaired the local convention committee: a jocular convention report by a fellow unionist portrays him as still speaking with an Irish brogue. It was later reported by The Typographical Journal that he had been nominated for clerk of courts, presumably as a Democrat.

He died at home in Milwaukee on April 2, 1919; his obituary described him as a "prominent leader in tho old Democratic circles of the state" and said, "he claimed tho record of having participated in 40 battles before he was made a captive". He was survived by two sons.
