= Bill Nye (disambiguation) =

Bill Nye (born 1955) is an American scientist known for his role in Bill Nye the Science Guy.

Bill Nye may also refer to:

- Edgar Wilson Nye (1850–1896), American journalist and humorist, also known as Bill Nye
- G. Raymond Nye (1889–1965), American silent film actor, also known as Bill Nye
- Bill Nye, fictional character in Bret Harte poem "The Heathen Chinee"

== See also ==
- Bill Nighy (born 1949), British actor
- Bill Nigh (disambiguation)
- Bill Knight (disambiguation)
- William Nye (disambiguation)
