= Humphrey J. Desmond =

19th century American politician

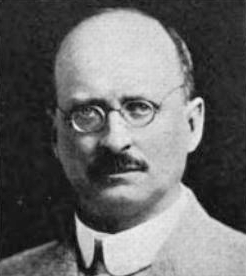

Member of the Wisconsin State Assembly from the Milwaukee 1st district
- In office January 5, 1891 – January 2, 1893
- Preceded by: Michael Dunn
- Succeeded by: Edward Keogh

Personal details
- Born: September 14, 1858 Cedarburg, Wisconsin, U.S.
- Died: February 16, 1932 (aged 73) Milwaukee, Wisconsin, U.S.
- Resting place: Calvary Cemetery, Milwaukee
- Party: Democratic
- Spouse: Susan Ryan (m. 1888–1932)
- Children: Dorothy Louise Desmond^{(b. 1889; died 1979)}; Humphrey Earl Desmond^{(b. 1900; died 1989)}; Marion E. (Kuesel)^{(b. 1903; died 1982)}; Thomas Edward Desmond^{(b. 1907; died 1995)}; John Allen Desmond^{(b. 1912; died 2004)}
- Education: University of Wisconsin Law School
- Occupation: Lawyer, writer, politician

Humphrey Joseph Desmond (September 14, 1858 – February 16, 1932) was an American lawyer, writer, newspaper editor, and politician. He was a member of the Wisconsin State Assembly in the 1891 session, representing the part of the city of Milwaukee.

== Life ==
Herny Joseph Desmond was born September 14, 1858, near Cedarburg, Wisconsin, the son of Thomas and Joanna Bowe Desmond. He moved with his parents to Milwaukee, Wisconsin in 1866. Desmond went to high school in Milwaukee and the University of Wisconsin and University of Wisconsin Law School where he received his law degree. He began his law practice in 1881. He married Susan Ryan, and they had six children.

From 1883 to 1890, Desmond served on the Milwaukee School Board. In 1888, he served as counsel before the Wisconsin Supreme Court in the Edgerton Bible Case. In 1891–1892, Desmond was elected a Democratic member of the Wisconsin State Assembly, and served as Chairman of the Committee on Education. He was a member of the board of regents of Marquette University.

Desmond was the proprietor of the Northwestern Chronicle in St. Paul; the New Century in Washington; and the Memphis Journal. In 1891, Desmond became the editor and publisher of The Catholic Citizen and wrote several books, historical studies, and essays. He was a contributor to the American Catholic Quarterly Review, Century, and the North American Review, and contributed a number of articles regarding matters of law to the Catholic Encyclopedia.

Desmond was a member of the American Historical Association, the Wisconsin Historical Association, and the Wisconsin Academy of Sciences. He died at his home in Milwaukee on February 16, 1932.

Wisconsin State Assembly
Preceded by Michael Dunn	Member of the Wisconsin State Assembly from the Milwaukee 1st district January 5, 1891 – January 2, 1893	Succeeded by Edward Keogh
