= Matt Mikulski =

American baseball player (born 1999)

Lexington Legends
- Pitcher
- Born: May 8, 1999 (age 27); Mohegan Lake, New York, U.S.
- Bats: Left Throws: Left

Matthew John Mikulski (born May 8, 1999) is an American professional baseball pitcher for the Lexington Legends of the Atlantic League of Professional Baseball. He played college baseball for the Fordham Rams. Mikulski was selected in the second round with the 50th overall pick of the 2021 MLB draft by the San Francisco Giants.

== Early life and amateur career ==
Mikulski was born and grew up in Mohegan Lake, New York. He was 5–8 and 175 pounds as a high school freshman, and attended John F. Kennedy Catholic High School for three years before transferring to Lakeland High School before his senior year. As a senior, he went 5–1 with a 1.07 ERA and 73 strikeouts and 28 hits allowed in 45 2/3 innings pitched.

Mikulski played baseball for the Fordham Rams. After his sophomore year in 2019, he played collegiate summer baseball for the Brewster Whitecaps of the Cape Cod Baseball League, where he posted a 1.86 ERA with 26 strikeouts in 19 1/3 innings pitched, and was named a league all-star. Mikulski went 2–1 with a 1.29 ERA and 18 strikeouts as a junior before the season was cut short due to the coronavirus pandemic. Mikulski went undrafted in the 2020 Major League Baseball draft despite being ranked the 203rd-best prospect by Baseball America and within the top 200 prospects by MLB.com. During his senior season, Mikulski committed to play in the Draft League, a summer collegiate league for 2021 MLB Draft prospects. He was also added to the watchlist for the Golden Spikes Award.

Mikulski finished his senior season with a 9–0 record on the mound with a 1.45 ERA (2nd in the conference) and 124 strikeouts (first) in 68 1/3 innings pitched with an 0.820 WHIP, 3.8 hits per nine innings, and 16.3 strikeouts per nine innings, and was named the Atlantic 10 Conference Baseball Pitcher of the Year. He threw a 94–97 mph fastball that touched 100 mph, an 86–88 mph slider, a changeup, and a 76–77 mph curveball. He was also named a unanimous All-America selection, First Team All-America by the NCBWA and American Baseball Coaches Association/Rawlings, Second Team by Collegiate Baseball and D1Baseball.com, and Third Team by Baseball America, First Team All-Atlantic 10, ABCA/Rawlings First Team All-Northeast Region, and the 2021 Vincent T. Lombardi Award winner as the top male athlete at Fordham.

== Professional career ==
=== San Francisco Giants ===
Mikulski was selected in the second round with the 50th overall pick of the 2021 Major League Baseball draft by the San Francisco Giants. He signed with the team on July 23, 2021, and received a $1.2 million signing bonus. He made his professional debut with the Rookie-level Arizona Complex League Giants with whom he pitched five innings in which he gave up one earned run.

Mikulski spent the 2022 campaign with the Single-A San Jose Giants, making 22 appearances (18 starts) and struggling to a 4–5 record and 6.95 ERA with 96 strikeouts over 79 innings of work. He pitched in 33 contests for the High-A Eugene Emeralds in 2023, registering a 4–3 record and 6.75 ERA with 71 strikeouts across 66 2/3 innings. Mikulski returned to Eugene in 2024, recording a 5.58 ERA with 55 strikeouts and 2 saves in 59 2/3 innings pitched across 37 appearances out of the bullpen.

On March 27, 2025, Mikulski was released by the Giants organization.

=== Houston Astros ===
On May 24, 2025, Mikulski signed a minor league contract with the Houston Astros. He made nine appearances for the High-A Asheville Tourists, posting a 5.68 ERA with 17 strikeouts; he also struggled to a 16.88 ERA with one strikeout in three games for the rookie-level Florida Complex League Astros.

=== Minnesota Twins ===
On July 31, 2025, Mikulski was traded from the Houston Astros to the Minnesota Twins in exchange for Carlos Correa and cash considerations. He made six appearances down the stretch for the High-A Cedar Rapids Kernels, registering an 0-1 record and 8.44 ERA with seven strikeouts across 5 1/3 innings pitched. Mikulski was released by the Twins organization on October 9.

=== York Revolution ===
On June 6, 2026, Mikulski signed with the York Revolution of the Atlantic League of Professional Baseball. He gave up 12 runs across nine innings pitched with York and was released on July 6.

=== Lexington Legends ===
On July 12, 2026, Mikulski signed with the Lexington Legends of the Atlantic League of Professional Baseball.
