= Patrick Walsh (Wisconsin politician) =

American politician (1830–1888)

Patrick Walsh (22 July 1830 – 19 March 1888) was an American farmer who spent two years as a Democratic member of the Wisconsin State Senate, and one year as a member of the Wisconsin State Assembly, from Milwaukee County.

== Early life ==
Walsh was born in Ireland. He was elected to the Senate for 1858 and 1859 from the Sixth District (3rd, 4th, 5th and 8th Wards of the City of Milwaukee, and the Towns of Franklin, Greenfield, Lake, Oak Creek and Wauwatosa), succeeding fellow Ireland-born Democrat Edward O'Neil.

== Legislative service ==
In 1859 his listing in the Wisconsin Blue Book describes him as a farmer; he was the youngest member of the Senate, at age 28, and was assigned to the standing committees on militia and on engrossed bills. In 1860, he was succeeded by Michael Egan, another Democrat born in Ireland.

He was elected to the Assembly's 9th Milwaukee County district (the Towns of Franklin, Greenfield, Lake, and Oak Creek) for 1868, succeeding fellow Democrat Valentin Knœll. He showed his postal address as "Hill's Corners" (presumably Hales Corners in the Town of Greenfield) and still listed himself as a farmer. He was assigned to the committees on state affairs, and on education.

He was succeeded for 1869 by Henry Roethe, also a Democrat.

His wife Mary Ann died at the age of 21 in 1859. Walsh apparently did not remarry and is buried with Mary Ann at the Saint Marys Cemetery in Hales Corners.
