= James McGrath (Wisconsin politician) =

American politician

Member of the Wisconsin State Assembly
- In office 1865–1874
- Succeeded by: Edward Keogh

Personal details
- Born: March 15, 1836 Ireland
- Died: Unknown
- Party: Democratic
- Other political affiliations: Independent

James McGrath was an Irish-born American politician who served as a member of the Wisconsin State Assembly from 1865 to 1874.

== Early life ==
McGrath was born on March 15, 1836, in Ireland. He later resided in Milwaukee, Wisconsin.

== Career ==
McGrath was a member of the Assembly during the 1865, 1866, 1867, 1868, 1870, 1873 and 1874 sessions. A Democrat while he was a member, he lost to Edward Keogh as an independent in 1875.
