= Gregg Ritchie =

American baseball player and coach (born 1964)

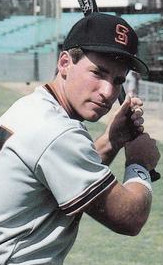
- Ritchie in 1988

George Washington Colonials
- Head baseball coach
- Born: January 25, 1964 (age 62); Washington, D.C., U.S.
- Bats: Left Throws: Left

CPBL statistics
- Batting average: .200
- Home runs: 0
- Runs batted in: 1
- Stats at Baseball Reference

Teams
- As player: Brother Elephants (1995) (CPBL); As coach: Pittsburgh Pirates (2011–2012) (Hitting coach); George Washington (2013–present)

Gregory Allen Ritchie (born January 25, 1964) is an American baseball player and coach. He is the head coach of the George Washington Colonials baseball team. He played for the Brother Elephants in the Chinese Professional Baseball League in 1995 and coached the Pittsburgh Pirates of Major League Baseball in 2013.

== Playing career ==
The San Francisco Giants selected Ritchie in the eighth round, with the 188th overall pick, of the 1986 Major League Baseball draft. He played in the Giants' minor league system from 1986 to 1992, reaching Triple-A. In 1995, he played in the Texas Rangers organization.

== Coaching career ==
In 1996, Ritchie became a hitting coach in the Chicago White Sox minor league system, working for the Bristol White Sox of the Appalachian League in 1996 and 1997, the Winston-Salem Warthogs of the Carolina League in 1999, the Burlington Bees of the Midwest League in 2000, the Birmingham Barons of the Southern League from 2000–2003, and the Charlotte Knights of the International League from 2003 through 2005. In 2006, Ritchie joined the Pittsburgh Pirates organization as their roving minor league hitting coordinator.

Ritchie was named the hitting coach for the Pittsburgh Pirates for the 2011 season. He was also their hitting coach for the 2012 season. On October 11, 2012, he was announced as the head baseball coach for George Washington. In his first season, he was named the 2013 A-10 Coach of the Year.

=== Head coaching record ===
Below is a table of Ritchie's yearly records as an NCAA head baseball coach.

Record table
Season	Team	Overall	Conference	Standing	Postseason
George Washington Colonials (Atlantic 10 Conference) (2013–present)
2013	George Washington	26–32	15–9	t-5th	A-10 Tournament
2014	George Washington	20–30	12–15	t-8th	
2015	George Washington	32–22	13–10	6th	A-10 Tournament
2016	George Washington	24–33	12–12	7th	A-10 Tournament
2017	George Washington	31–27	14–10	4th	A-10 Tournament
2018	George Washington	32–26	13–11	T-7th	A-10 Tournament
2019	George Washington	30–24	11–13	9th	
2020	George Washington	8–8	0–0		Season canceled due to COVID-19
2021	George Washington	26–18	14–10	3rd (South)	
2022	George Washington	22–30	10–14	T-8th	
2023	George Washington	21–34	11–12	8th	
2024	George Washington	31–26	13–11	T-4th	A-10 Tournament
2025	George Washington	27–27	14–16	T–7th	
2026	George Washington	18–35	9–21	10th	
George Washington:		348–372 (.483)	161–165 (.494)		
Total:		348–372 (.483)			
National champion Postseason invitational champion Conference regular season champion Conference regular season and conference tournament champion Division regular season champion Division regular season and conference tournament champion Conference tournament champion
