= George Floyd protests in Oklahoma =

2020 civil unrest after the murder of George Floyd

- Part of George Floyd protests
- Date: May 30 – June 12, 2020 (1 week and 6 days)
- Location: Oklahoma, United States
- Caused by: Police brutality; Institutional racism against African Americans; Reaction to the murder of George Floyd; Economic, racial and social inequality

This is a list of protests in Oklahoma related to the murder of George Floyd.

== Locations ==
=== Ardmore ===
On May 31, approximately 150 people peacefully marched from the HFV Wilson Community Center through the streets of downtown Ardmore and back to protest the murder of George Floyd, shouting "I can't breathe" and "no justice, no peace."

=== Bartlesville ===
On June 5, hundreds of protesters marched through downtown Bartlesville to protest the murder of George Floyd.

=== Broken Arrow ===
On June 6, around 1,000 demonstrators marched from Central Park down Main Street and back to support Black Lives Matter and George Floyd. Before marching from Central Park, they held a moment of silence for eight minutes and forty-six seconds to honor Floyd's memory.

=== Edmond ===
On June 6, a crowd of peaceful protesters demonstrated in front of the Edmond Police Department and marched through the streets to protest the murder of George Floyd. They also protested the death of teenager Isaiah Lewis, who had been killed by Edmond police officers a year prior.

=== Enid ===
A few dozen protesters peacefully demonstrated on Tuesday, June 2, by marching to the courthouse square at noon, chanting and waving signs for about an hour. Before the protesters dispersed, a city councilman appeared and invited them to attend that evening's city council meeting and speak during the public comment time. Another protest was held on June 7, this one drawing about 100 protesters.

=== Lawton ===
One thousand people gathered and then marched around Lawton City Hall on May 31.

=== Muskogee ===
On May 31, over a dozen people protested outside a Walmart and walked back and forth on the Shawnee Bypass in support of Black Lives Matter and George Floyd.

=== Norman ===
Hundreds of protesters gathered in Norman on June 1, 2020, for a peaceful protest.

=== Oklahoma City ===
On May 30, protesters gathered at Northwest 23rd Street and Classen Boulevard around 7:30 p.m. for a peaceful protest. However, the protest soon grew violent as reports of vandalism and looting were made, and police employed tear gas at least three times and arrested 13 people. On May 31, another violent protest was held outside the police department where a Trump 2020 flag was burned. Mayor David Holt set a 10:00 p.m. curfew, and at least 25 more arrests were made. Black Lives Matter, who had organized protests that afternoon at the Oklahoma State Capitol, denied any involvement in the evening riots. The local BLM chapter followed up with a list of demands toward city leaders, which included an apology from Holt and the resignation of the local police chief.

On June 6, protesters in the Bricktown district marched to Harkins Theatres chanting "I can't breathe" and "Black Lives Matter". On June 12, hundreds more protesters marched from Harkins Theatres to the Oklahoma City Police Department's headquarters, where they confronted officers about the deaths of unarmed black Americans at the hands of police.

=== Stillwater ===
On June 3, 2020, several hundred protested peacefully with speakers and signs in front of the police station.

=== Tulsa ===
On Saturday, May 30, hundreds of people protested peacefully on a six-mile march through midtown. One protester was hit by a vehicle when the protest moved onto Interstate 44, briefly shutting it down. Protests continued on May 31, when thousands gathered in the Greenwood District, the site of the 1921 Tulsa race massacre, to demand police accountability and reform. In the evening, police officers blocked protesters from walking down Peoria Avenue and used tear gas to disperse the crowd. Reports of vandalism were made as rocks were thrown at cars and shop windows were broken. Three people were arrested.

A pickup truck towing a horse trailer drove through a crowd of Black Lives Matter protesters on I-244 in May, seriously injuring three. The Tulsa County District Attorney's Office declined to press criminal charges against the driver, citing the truck's occupants' "immediate fear for their safety". In response to the incident, House Bill 1674 was introduced into the Oklahoma Legislature in February 2021, which makes illegal obstruction of roads a misdemeanor and grants civil and criminal immunity to motorists who unintentionally harm someone while fleeing a riot. (Note: The bill refers to a riot as defined in Oklahoma Statute §21-1311, which states: "Any use of force or violence, or any threat to use force or violence if accompained [sic] by immediate power of execution, by three or more persons acting together and without authority of law, is riot.") The bill passed the House in March and the Senate in April, and was signed into law by governor Kevin Stitt in April. The bill took effect in November 2021.
