= Bill Nigh =

Bill Nigh(y) or William Nigh may refer to:

== Actors ==
- Bill Nighy (born 1949), British actor (playing a wide variety of film roles)
- William Nigh (1881-1955), American filmmaker and actor
- William Nigh (politician) (1920–2008), American politician

== See also ==
- Bill Knight (disambiguation)
- Bill Nye (disambiguation)
- William Nye (disambiguation)
