= John Lagrand (politician) =

American politician

John Lagrand (born October 15, 1849) was a Republican member of the Wisconsin State Assembly from Milwaukee for one term (1885–86), representing the Sixth Assembly district of Milwaukee County (the sixth and thirteenth wards of the City of Milwaukee).

== Background ==
Lagrand was born in the sixth ward on October 15, 1849, and always resided in the state. He received a common school education and went into what his official biography described as "the livery and undertaking business". He was elected as alderman from the sixth ward in 1882.

== Legislative service ==
Lagrand was elected to the Assembly in 1884, receiving 1,682 votes against 1,499 votes for Democrat G. J. Obermann. He was not the Republican candidate in 1886, and was succeeded by Populist Joseph Meyers.
