= Darin Hendrickson =

American college baseball coach

Biographical details
- Born: Granite City, Illinois, U.S.

Playing career
- 1990–1991: SIU Edwardsville
- Position: Pitcher

Coaching career (HC unless noted)
- 1993–1995: SIU Edwardsville (assistant)
- 1996–1999: Fontbonne
- 2000–2003: STLCC–Forest Park
- 2004–2007: Central Missouri
- 2008–2025: Saint Louis

Administrative career (AD unless noted)
- 1995–1999: Fontbonne (assistant AD)
- 1999–2003: STLCC–Forest Park

Head coaching record
- Overall: 880–505 (college); 155–74 (junior college)
- Tournaments: NCAA D-I: 0–4; NCAA D-III: 0–2

Accomplishments and honors

Championships
- 6 A-10 regular season (2012, 2013, 2014, 2015, 2018, 2024); 3x A-10 Tournament (2010, 2013, 2018); 2 NCAA DII Regional (2004, 2005); 3 MIAA (2004, 2005, 2007); 3 MIAA Tournament (2004, 2005, 2006); NJCAA DII Super Regional (2001); 4 NJCAA DII Regional (2000, 2001, 2002, 2003); SLIAC (1998); SLIAC Tournament (1998)

Awards
- 3x A-10 Coach of the Year (2012, 2018, 2024); 3x MIAA Coach of the Year (2004, 2005, 2007); NJCAA DII District Coach of the Year (2001); 4x NJCAA DII Region Coach of the Year (2001, 2002, 2003, 2004); MCCAC Coach of the Year (2001); NCAA DIII Central Region Coach of the Year (1998); SLIAC Coach of the Year (1998)

Darin Hendrickson is an American college baseball coach who was head coach at Saint Louis University from 2008 to 2025. Hendrickson has also served as the batting practice pitcher for the St. Louis Cardinals.

== Playing career ==
Hendrickson pitched for two seasons (1990–1991) at his alma mater, SIU Edwardsville. He was named First-Team All-Region both season and ranks among the school's leaders in career winning percentage, with an 18–5 (.783) overall record.

== Coaching career ==
Following his graduation in 1992, Hendrickson served as an assistant at SIU Edwardsville for three seasons (1993–1995) while he earned his master's degree there. He considered attending law school, but elected to stay in college coaching.

=== Fontbonne ===
Hendrickson's first head coaching position came at NCAA Division III Fontbonne, where he helped to start the Griffins' baseball program. Hendrickson coached there for four seasons (1996–1999). His best came in 1998, when the Griffins went 41–7 and won the SLIAC regular season and tournament championships to qualify for the NCAA tournament. At the Central Regional, Fontbonne went 0–2, losing 6–4 to North Central and 17–2 to Carthage. Hendrickson was named both the 1998 SLIAC and Central Region Coach of the Year.

=== STLCC–Forest Park ===
From Fontbonne, Hendrickson moved to NJCAA Division II St. Louis Community College–Forest Park, where he served as both the athletic director and head baseball coach for four seasons (2000–2003). Forest Park qualified for the NJCAA Tournament in each of his four seasons, reaching the NJCAA World Series in 2001. That year, Hendrickson was named both District and MCCAC Coach of the Year.

=== Central Missouri ===
When Central Missouri State head coach Brad Hill left for Kansas State after the 2003 season, Hendrickson was hired to replace him. At his introductory press conference, Hendrickson said, "The tradition is something I'm really looking forward to. Looking at their history, it is just amazing. I've only had an opportunity to view it from the outside. I am really excited to be a part of it now."

Hendrickson spent four seasons (2004–2007) at Central Missouri. Under him, the Mules had three 50-win seasons and won three Mid-America Intercollegiate Athletics Association regular season and tournament titles each. They appeared in the NCAA tournament in all four of his seasons. In 2004, the Mules swept through the Central Regional, defeating Wayne State (NE) 22–2 in the regional championship. At the College World Series, the team lost its opener to Delta State but recovered to finish third. In 2005, the Mules again swept through the Central Regional and finished third at the College World Series. In 2006 and 2007, the program reached the NCAA tournament but was eliminated in the Central Regional. Hendrickson was named the MIAA Coach of the Year in 2004, 2005, and 2007.

In 2005, five Central Missouri pitchers were selected in the first 11 rounds of the MLB draft. These included second-round selection Nicholas Webber and tenth-round selection Josh Outman. Outman, who had begun his career under Hendrickson at Forest Park and followed him to Central Missouri, went on to pitch in Major League Baseball.

=== Saint Louis ===
Hendrickson left Central Missouri for the head coaching position at Saint Louis ahead of the 2008 season.

After missing the A-10 tournament in his first two seasons, the Billikens won it in 2010 to qualify for their first NCAA tournament under Hendrickson. At the Louisville Regional, Saint Louis went 0–2, losing games to host Louisville and Illinois State.

Saint Louis won three straight A-10 regular season titles in 2012, 2013, and 2014. In 2012, Hendrickson was named the A-10 Coach of the Year. In 2013, the team went 41–21 and also won the A-10 tournament to qualify for another NCAA tournament. At the Columbia Regional, the Billikens lost both games, 7–3 to host South Carolina and 10–2 to second-seeded Clemson.

At Saint Louis, Hendrickson has had several major award winners and professional draftees. Pitcher Alex Alemann won the 2010 A-10 Rookie of the Year Award, and first baseman Mike Vigliarolo was named the league's co-Player of the Year in 2013. Between 2008–2014, Saint Louis has had eight MLB draft selections under Hendrickson. The number includes two top-ten round picks: catcher Grant Nelson, a ninth-round pick of the Arizona Diamondbacks in 2013, and pitcher James Norwood, a seventh-round pick of the Chicago Cubs in 2014.

After a 33-26 season and second-place finish in the A-10 in 2025, SLU stated Hendrickson was “no longer employed at the university" in September 2025.

== Head coaching record ==
Below is a table of Hendrickson's yearly records as a collegiate head baseball coach.

Record table
Season	Team	Overall	Conference	Standing	Postseason
Fontbonne (SLIAC) (1996–1999)
1996	Fontbonne	23–19	11–5	2nd	SLIAC Tournament
1997	Fontbonne	27–16	10–4	2nd	SLIAC Tournament
1998	Fontbonne	41–7	11–2	1st	NCAA Regional
1999	Fontbonne	35–12	8–6	T-4th	SLIAC Tournament
Fontbonne:		126–54	40–17		
STLCC–Forest Park (MCCAC – NJCAA DII) (2000–2003)
2000	STLCC–Forest Park	35–22	12–8		NJCAA Super Regional
2001	STLCC–Forest Park	41–22	18–4		NJCAA World Series
2002	STLCC–Forest Park	34–20	12–8		NJCAA Super Regional
2003	STLCC–Forest Park	45–10	14–4		NJCAA Super Regional
STLCC–Forest Park:		155–74	56–24		
Central Missouri State/Central Missouri (Note: Following the 2006 season, Central Missouri State University renamed itself the University of Central Missouri.) (MIAA) (2004–2007)
2004	Central Missouri State	57–8	26–5	1st	College World Series
2005	Central Missouri State	57–9	27–4	1st	College World Series
2006	Central Missouri State	44–16	22–8	2nd	NCAA Regional
2007	Central Missouri	51–13	28–6	1st	NCAA Regional
Central Missouri State:		209–46	103–23		
Saint Louis (Atlantic 10) (2008–2025)
2008	Saint Louis	24–29	9–17	13th	
2009	Saint Louis	30–25	12–13	7th	
2010	Saint Louis	33–29	15–12	T-4th	NCAA Regional
2011	Saint Louis	28–27	10–14	10th	
2012	Saint Louis	41–18	17–7	T-1st	A-10 tournament
2013	Saint Louis	41–21	17–7	T-1st	NCAA Regional
2014	Saint Louis	34–21	18–7	1st	A-10 tournament
2015	Saint Louis	35–21	16–8	1st	A-10 tournament
2016	Saint Louis	25–31	15–9	4th	A-10 tournament
2017	Saint Louis	35–22	12–10	5th	A-10 tournament
2018	Saint Louis	35–18	19–4	1st	NCAA Regional
2019	Saint Louis	25–30	13–11	T-7th	A-10 tournament
2020	Saint Louis	10–6	0–0		Season canceled due to COVID-19
2021	Saint Louis	17–31	6–10	5th (South)	
2022	Saint Louis	29–24	14–9	3rd	A-10 tournament
2023	Saint Louis	33–23	15–9	T-3rd	A-10 tournament
2024	Saint Louis	37–16	16–8	1st	A-10 tournament
2025	Saint Louis	33–26	18–12	T−4th	A-10 tournament
Saint Louis:		545–432	235–181		
Total:		880–525			
National champion Postseason invitational champion Conference regular season champion Conference regular season and conference tournament champion Division regular season champion Division regular season and conference tournament champion Conference tournament champion

== See also ==
- List of current NCAA Division I baseball coaches
- Saint Louis Billikens
