= Michael Egan (Wisconsin politician) =

American politician (1827–1910)

Michael John Egan (June 2, 1827 – January 23, 1910) was an American merchant and insurance agent who served two years as a Democratic member of the Wisconsin State Senate and two as a member of the Wisconsin State Assembly from Milwaukee County.

== Background ==
Egan was born in the city of Kilkenny, Ireland on June 2, 1827. He graduated from St Kieran's College in Kilkenny in 1847. He came to Wisconsin in 1848, and settled at Franklin. He became a merchant by trade.

== Public office ==
He was a state senator in 1860 and 1861 from the Sixth District (3rd, 4th, 5th and 8th Wards of the City of Milwaukee, and the towns of Franklin, Greenfield, Lake Oak Creek and Wauwatosa), succeeding fellow Democrat and native of Ireland Patrick Walsh; during the 1861 session he was on the standing committees on the militia, on education, school, and university lands, on enrolled bills, and on railroads. In 1862 he was succeeded by fellow Democrat Edward Keogh.

As of 1882, he was working as an insurance agent. He had been chairman of the town board for fifteen years and chairman of the County board of supervisors for several years, and a justice of the peace for thirty years, when he was elected to the Assembly's 12th Milwaukee County district (the towns of Franklin, Greenfield, Lake and Oak Creek) for 1883, receiving 979 votes, against 746 for Republican R. M. Berry. (The district, formerly numbered the 11th until the decennial redistricting, had previously been represented by Republican William M. Williams, Jr.; and had been represented by Patrick Walsh in 1868.) He was assigned to the standing committee on insurance, banks and banking, and the joint committee on claims. He was not a candidate for re-election in 1884, and was succeeded by Republican James Lemont (also a native of Ireland).
