= Henry Vogt =

American politician

Henry Vogt (May 5, 1853 – October 21, 1934) was a Prussian-born American cigar maker and policeman from Milwaukee, Wisconsin who served one term as a People's Party member of the Wisconsin State Assembly.

== Background ==
Vogt was born Heinrich Vogt in 1853 to Christopher Vogt and Anna Maria Tolle. Vogt received a common school education in Prussia. He emigrated, settled in Milwaukee in 1874 and became a cigar maker. Vogt was a police officer in Milwaukee in 1882–83.

== Elective office ==
Vogt was one of the labor leaders under indictment for their roles in the labor unrest which ended in the Bay View Massacre, but had held no governmental office until elected to the Assembly in 1886 from the 9th Milwaukee County Assembly district (the 9th Ward of the City of Milwaukee) to succeed Democrat Gottfried Inden (who was not a candidate for re-election) for the session of 1887. Adam won 1,119 votes to 563 for Republican John Deverth and 385 votes for Democrat Mathias Humann. He did not run for re-election in 1888, and was succeeded by Republican George Christiaansen.
