= Daniel Hooker =

American politician

Daniel Darius Hooker (December 22, 1831 – April 26, 1894) was an American molder and tool manufacturer from Milwaukee, Wisconsin who served two terms as a member of the Wisconsin State Assembly. He was elected as a "Democratic Trades Assembly" candidate in 1882 (the Milwaukee Trades Assembly, a labor federation which was also an antecedent to that state's Union Labor Party, ran its own direct candidates against Democrats in other districts); and re-elected in 1884.

== Background ==
Hooker was born in Perryburg, New York, on December 22, 1831, and received a public school education. He came to Wisconsin in 1854 and lived in Fond du Lac until moving in 1868 to Milwaukee. He worked as a molder, and while working at one of Edward P. Allis' plants lost his leg, when a ladle of molten iron was toppled. His wife, Mary Ann Peacock, died in 1872 of tuberculosis; they had three children, Harry C., William Francis (who became a writer) and Jennie M. As of 1883 he was a manufacturer of tools.

== Assembly ==
Hooker had never been a candidate for office before being elected in 1882 from the 5th Milwaukee County Assembly district (the Fifth and Twelfth Ward of the City of Milwaukee), as a "democratic trades assembly" candidate, with 1,054 votes to 943 for Republican D. W. Chipman (incumbent Republican William Lindsay was not a candidate). He listed his party affiliation as "Trades Assembly" (one of two such) in the Wisconsin Blue Book, and was assigned to the standing committee on state affairs.

Hooker was re-elected in 1884, again as a "democratic trades assembly" candidate, drawing 1,869 votes to 1,674 for Republican John Toohey and 59 votes for Prohibitionist Otto Miller. He was now listed as a Democrat, and remained on the state affairs committee.

In 1886, Hooker had become simply a Democrat, and alderman Theodore Rudzinski was the "People's Party" nominee. He unseated Hooker with 1,705 votes to 832 votes for D. W. Chipman, 759 votes for Hooker, and 18 votes for Prohibitionist J. Y. Wolf.

In later years, he was remembered as the "father" of the law requiring fire escapes on large buildings.

== Later life ==
Hooker went to work for the Milwaukee post office in approximately 1884 (the Assembly was not at that time a full-time job). He had worked there for ten years, and was a directory clerk, at the time of his death at his home in the Fernwood neighborhood of Milwaukee. He died on April 26, 1894 after an illness which had left him bedridden since January 1 of that year. He was buried in Fond du Lac's Rienzi Cemetery, where his wife and other members of his family were interred.
