= Knight's Spider Web Farm =

Coordinates: 44.11676°N 72.54317°W

Sign at the farm

Knight's Spider Web Farm is an art studio, retail outlet and residence located in Williamstown, Vermont. The farm was started by Will Knight in 1978 when he decided to use spider webs to produce art. The finished artwork uses whole spider webs as a form of textile art over painted or stained wood. He referred to his farm as "The Original Web Site". Will Knight died on June 12, 2017, but his family continues his work at the farm.

== Spider webs as art ==
Knight (b. 1926) got the idea of harvesting spider webs to use as art with the help of his wife and begun in 1977 using spider webs found at their home. They started the farm in 1978 after Knight lost his job working for the state highway department. He claims the original idea was based on ideas from the Girl Scout Manual. His wife was an artist who used decoupage, and Knight says, "She knew that you could glue things onto things." As he had been a cabinetmaker and produced fine woodworking, it seemed logical to combine the two, and they eventually figured out how to glue spider webs onto wood.

== Harvesting spider webs ==
The farm uses custom made square racks built from wood which are hung in multiple sheds in his back yard. The process consists of spraying the web with white paint so that it is more visible, then removing the rack with the spider web intact. The rack is then placed over a flat, smooth board that has been painted black or stained, to which the web will naturally stick. The entire surface is then coated with lacquer, providing a smooth finish. Because spiders are prolific web builders, webs can be harvested daily.

Because each spider web is unique, no two art pieces are the same. Once the webs are harvested and lacquered they are offered for sale. Often, they are used as canvases by other artists who then paint realistic flowers and plants on the lacquered surface. While the couple originally sold the spider webs at craft fairs (even renting a pushcart for a week at Faneuil Hall Marketplace), the artwork is now sold only online and in their own gift shop at the farm.
