= Bobby Kingsbury =

- Outfielder
- Born: August 30, 1980 (age 45); Cleveland, Ohio, U:S.
- Bats: Left Throws: Left
- Stats at Baseball Reference

Robert Raymond Kingsbury (born August 30, 1980) is an American baseball player.

He went to school at Fordham where he set an NCAA record for stolen bases in a game (8), and was drafted by the Pittsburgh Pirates in the 8th round of the 2002 Major League Baseball Draft, but his excellent glove, a quick bat, an intelligent hitting approach, and his work ethic "could have given him a third or fourth-round pick if he'd gone to a warm-weather college".

He is a two-time Atlantic 10 Conference Player of the Year award winner and went on to play in the Pittsburgh Pirates minor-league organization. Kingsbury was the first baseball player to consecutively earn Atlantic 10 Player of the Year Awards, in 2001 and 2002.

During the 2004 Summer Olympics held in Athens, Greece, Kingsbury, who has a Greek grandmother, was given the chance to play for the host nation, Greece. Most of the players on the Greek baseball team were Americans with Greek heritage, including North Florida coach Dusty Rhodes, and White Sox scout John Kazanas, Clay Bellinger of the Orioles, outfielders Nick Markakis the Orioles and Nick Theodorou of the Dodgers, and catchers Mike Tonis of Royals and George Kottaras of the Padres.

Kingsbury, an alumnus and 2008 Hall of Fame inductee of Fordham University and current member of the Pittsburgh Pirates organization, picked up one of the biggest hits of the tournament for Greece, an RBI triple, in their lone win, which came against Italy in the preliminary round.

In the spring of 2006, Kingsbury was invited to the Pirates major-league camp in Bradenton, Florida, as a non-roster invitee. During the seventh inning of the first game against the Philadelphia Phillies, Kingsbury dove for a ball in right field and upon hitting the ground dislocated his left throwing shoulder. He ended his 2006 campaign after suffering a full rotator cuff tear and a tear in his labrum.
