= Joseph J. Hadfield =

American politician

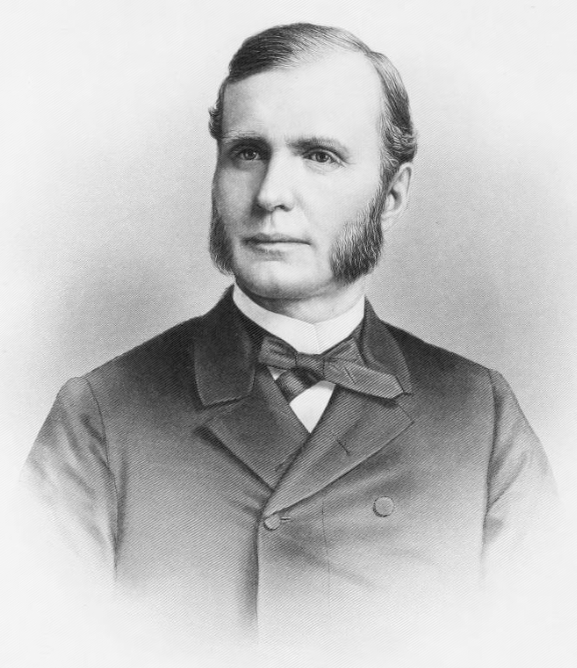

Member of the Wisconsin State Assembly
- In office 1887

Personal details
- Born: Joseph Jackson Hadfield; August 2, 1844 Waukesha, Wisconsin, US
- Died: May 14, 1894 (aged 49) Waukesha, Wisconsin, US
- Party: Democratic
- Occupation: Businessman, politician
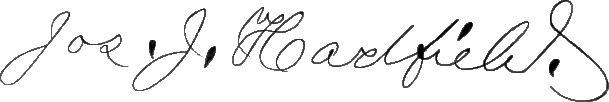
- Signature

Joseph Jackson Hadfield (August 2, 1844 – May 14, 1894) was an American businessman and politician.

== Biography ==
Born in Waukesha, Wisconsin on August 2, 1844, Hadfield was a wool dealer and was in the real estate business. From 1873 to 1880, Hadfield lived in Ottumwa, Iowa. In 1882, Hadfield was elected trustee of the village of Waukesha and then became president of the village. In 1887, Hadfield served in the Wisconsin State Assembly and was a Democrat. Hadfield died of cancer in Waukesha, Wisconsin on May 14, 1894.
