= Marcus H. Barnum =

American politician

Marcus Hinsman Barnum (March 14, 1834 – July 31, 1904) was an American lawyer, businessman, and politician.

Born in Syracuse, New York, Barnum moved to Rosendale, Wisconsin in 1855 and taught school. He then moved to Wausau, Wisconsin, in 1858, was admitted to the Wisconsin bar, and elected District Attorney of Marathon County, Wisconsin in 1857 and in 1872. During the American Civil War, he served in the Union Army. After the war, he published a newspaper, The Torch of Liberty, and owned a summer hotel. Barnum was convicted of libel in 1896 and served part of a prison sentence, but was then pardoned. Barnum served in the Wisconsin State Assembly in 1897 and was a Republican. He died in Wausau, Wisconsin.
