= Henry Miller (Wisconsin judge) =

American politician

Henry Miller (February 19, 1849 – May 20, 1920) was an American politician, businessman, and jurist.

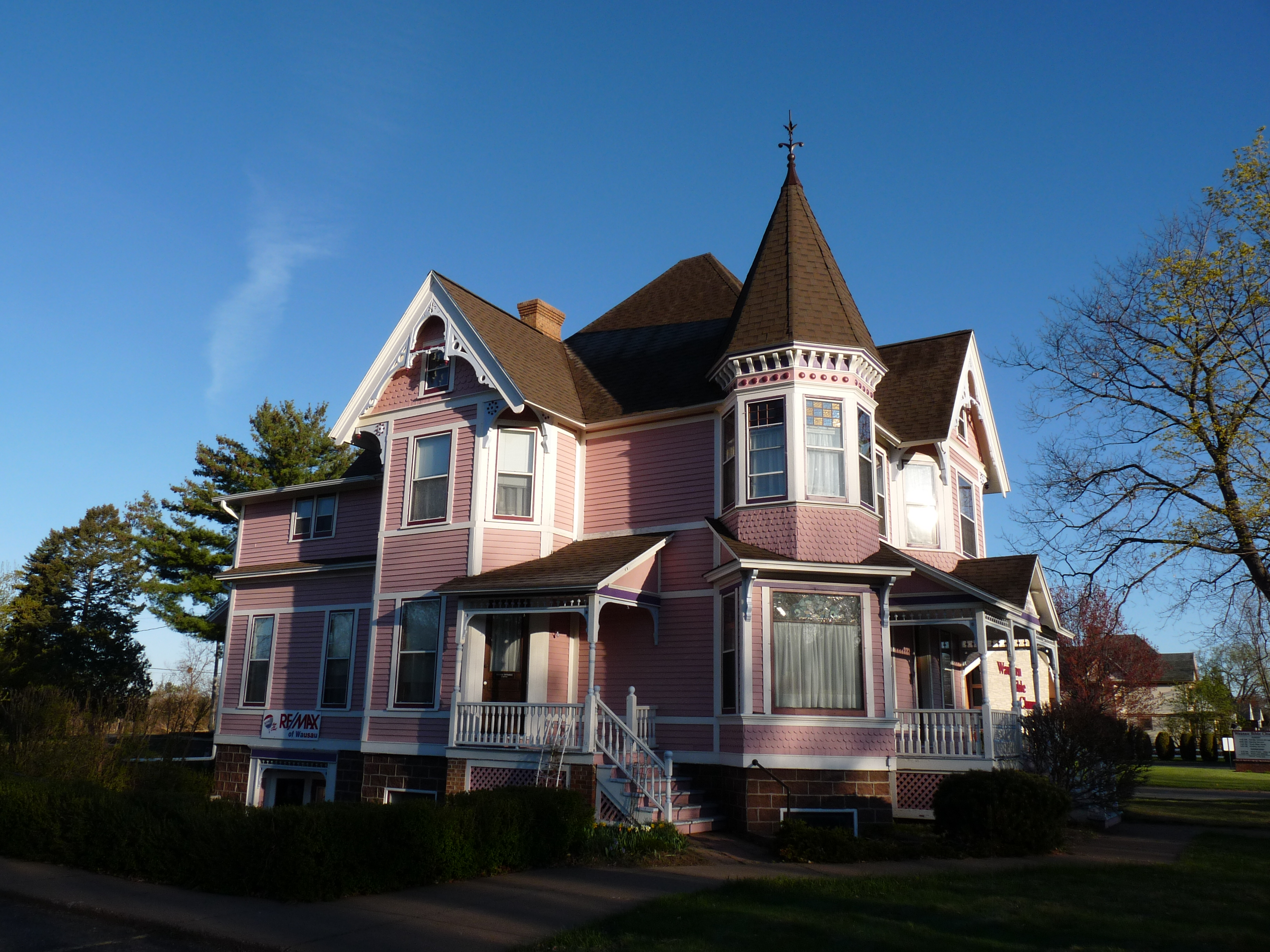
Miller's home in Wausau

Born in Lang-Goens, Grand Duchy of Hesse, Miller emigrated to the United States, in 1868, and lived in New York City. In 1872, Miller moved to Wausau, Wisconsin and worked in the lumber business. He later taught school, worked a merchandise store, and was elected Wausau City Clerk in 1875. In 1878, Miller was elected County Clerk of Marathon County, Wisconsin and served until 1887. He then served in the Wisconsin State Assembly in 1887 and was a Democrat. In 1890, Miller was elected municipal judge and then was appointed county judge in 1894 and served until 1910. He died in Wausau, Wisconsin.
