= List of vehicle-ramming incidents during George Floyd protests =

During the George Floyd protests that started in Minneapolis–Saint Paul after the murder of George Floyd, several incidents occurred in which vehicles were driven into protestors. According to Ari Weil, a terrorism researcher, there were 104 incidents of vehicles driving into protests between May 27 and September 27, 2020, with two fatalities in that time period. According to law enforcement and terrorism experts some of the incidents were targeted and politically motivated, however the vast majority were incidents involving scared drivers who were surrounded by protesters in their vehicle. Ari Weil alleges that at least 43 of the incidents were malicious and 39 people were charged.

== List of incidents ==
Vehicle ramming incidents during the George Floyd protests
Date	City or town	State	Details
May 27, 2020	Los Angeles	California	A California Highway Patrol car drove off with a man who jumped on its hood after its windows were smashed with rocks during a protest on the 101 Freeway.
May 28, 2020	Denver	Colorado	Video showed a protester falling from the front of a car. The driver then appears to intentionally swerve to hit the man, injuring him.
May 29, 2020	Bakersfield	California	A man was arrested for driving into a crowd in Bakersfield, injuring a 15-year-old girl.
May 29, 2020	Bowling Green	Kentucky	A man was arrested for hitting protesters with his pick-up truck outside the Bowling Green Police Department building.
May 29, 2020	Detroit	Michigan	A man was arrested for attempting to hit two Detroit bicycle officers.
May 29, 2020	Jackson	Mississippi	A van was filmed driving into a demonstrator and forcing her to move.
May 29, 2020	New York City	New York	An NYPD officer was placed on modified duty after video showed them opening the passenger door of a moving vehicle to hit a protester.
May 29, 2020	San Jose	California	A woman was arrested for driving through a crowd of protesters. A deputy shot at her SUV during the incident. A separate incident also occurred in San Jose.
May 30, 2020	Akron	Ohio	A protester was hospitalized after being struck by a pick-up truck.
May 30, 2020	Anacortes	Washington	A woman was knocked over after a car drove into a group of protesters at the busiest intersection in Anacortes.
May 30, 2020	Eureka	California	Two different cars struck protesters.
May 30, 2020	Fullerton	California	A man in a gold SUV drove into a group of protesters.
May 30, 2020	Gainesville	Florida	A man was arrested for driving a car into a crowd of protesters and pointing a gun at them.
May 30, 2020	Kokomo	Indiana	A woman drove her truck into a group of protesters. According to police the driver is a correctional officer, who resigned after the incident.
May 30, 2020	Lincoln	Nebraska	A man was arrested for hitting a demonstrator with his car on 25th and O Street.
May 30, 2020	New York City	New York	Two New York City Police officers drove their police cars into protestors.
May 30, 2020	Salt Lake City	Utah	A man who identified himself as Brandon McCormick drove his car into protesters before getting out and pointing a bow and arrow at them. Protesters then tackled McCormick and overturned his car.
May 30, 2020	Tallahassee	Florida	A group of protesters were hit by a pickup truck driver on North Monroe Street. The driver was arrested by police.
May 30, 2020	Visalia	California	A Jeep displaying a Keep America Great flag hit two protesters in downtown Visalia. The Jeep's occupants allegedly cupped their ears to pretend they couldn't hear the protesters, according to witnesses.
May 30, 2020	West Fargo	North Dakota	A man drove his car into protesters in West Fargo. One protester clung onto his car for three blocks before falling off.
May 31, 2020	Belfast	Maine	Protesters say a man attempted to hit a group of people occupying the road. No injuries were reported.
May 31, 2020	Lawrence	Kansas	At least two individuals drove vehicles into protesters occupying an intersection. One person was treated for minor injuries.
May 31, 2020	Bloomington	Illinois	A 21-year-old man was arrested for hitting protesters with a motorcycle, injuring two. He was charged with assault and committing a hate crime.
May 31, 2020	Boston	Massachusetts	An SUV was driven into a group of protesters in downtown Boston. The incident was recorded by news agencies that were covering the protest.
May 31, 2020	Daytona Beach	Florida	A woman intentionally drove her car over a protester's foot. She will be charged with aggravated battery.
May 31, 2020	Lansing	Michigan	A woman drove her car through a protest, nearly hitting several people. State troopers pulled the woman from her vehicle, but they did not arrest her.
May 31, 2020	Los Angeles	California	An LAPD cruiser struck two people after being surrounded by protesters.
May 31, 2020	Minneapolis	Minnesota	A tanker truck was driven into protesters on the I-35 West bridge. The driver was arrested. State officials say that he may not have known the road was closed.
May 31, 2020	Pasadena	California	At least two people drove their cars through protesters in Old Pasadena. In one incident a car drove away with a person clinging to the hood.
May 31, 2020	Santa Rosa	California	A 17-year-old boy was arrested for assault with a deadly weapon a week after allegedly trying to run over protesters with a pickup truck near Old Courthouse Square, and accelerating towards Fourth Street. One site reported that multiple protesters were injured, but none were reported to be major or required medical attention.
May 31, 2020	Tulsa	Oklahoma	A car was driven through protesters on a highway overpass. One protester, Ryan Knight, fell from the overpass and was paralyzed.
June 1, 2020	Buffalo	New York	Three people were arrested after a car was driven into a line of police officers.
June 1, 2020	Columbia	Missouri	Two people were injured in separate incidents in Columbia.
June 1, 2020	Medford	Oregon	Protesters called for the mayor of neighboring Phoenix to resign after he allegedly hit a woman with a car during a protest in Medford.
June 1, 2020	Portland	Maine	A Massachusetts trucker was arrested for driving a tractor-trailer into protesters.
June 1, 2020	Troy	Michigan	Two people were hit by a motorist during a demonstration in Troy. No injuries were reported.
June 1, 2020	West Babylon	New York	A man attempted to hit three teenage protesters after a verbal confrontation outside of a 7-Eleven. One of the teenagers says the man yelled "White Lives Matter".
June 2, 2020	New York City	New York	A man drove up to a group of protesters and shouted profanities and racial slurs at them, before exiting his vehicle and threatening them with a bladed glove, the longest blade being about a foot long. He then entered his SUV and drove onto the sidewalk towards demonstrators. He was convicted on several counts of attempted murder in 2023.
June 3, 2020	Bakersfield	California	Protester Robert Forbes was killed after being struck by a car in Bakersfield. The driver, Timothy Keith Moore, later died in Baja California in Mexico.
June 3, 2020	Cincinnati	Ohio	A car hit a group of protesters outside city hall. The Cincinnati Police Department does not believe the incident was intentional, while city councilman P.G. Sittenfeld, who was present at the scene, believes it was.
June 3, 2020	Colorado Springs	Colorado	A Jeep struck a woman during a protest in Colorado Springs.
June 3, 2020	Durham	North Carolina	A car drove past a roadblock towards protesters that were lying in downtown Durham. The car stopped when the protesters got up and off the road.
June 3, 2020	Newport Beach	California	A car drove into a protest, nearly hitting a toddler. The driver was arrested by police.
June 3, 2020	Seattle	Washington	A man was arrested for hitting protesting cyclists with a sedan.
June 4, 2020	Alamosa	Colorado	An attorney was arrested for attempted murder for shooting a man driving through a protest in Alamosa.
June 5, 2020	Chattanooga	Tennessee	Video shows a protester hit by a motorist near the Chattanooga Convention Center.
June 5, 2020	Farrell	Pennsylvania	A woman struck a group of protesters in Farrell. She was placed in a police car but not charged.
June 5, 2020	Memphis	Tennessee	An SUV driven by a teenager struck four protesters in Midtown. A second man is also accused of ramming protesters.
June 6, 2020	Elkin	North Carolina	Elkin Police say a man hit a protester with his car before getting out and threatening him with a gun.
June 6, 2020	Jackson	Michigan	The mayor of Jackson confirmed that a car was driven into protesters. The driver was arrested by police.
June 7, 2020	Lakeside	Virginia	Harry Rogers, a Ku Klux Klan leader, was arrested for driving a car into protesters.
June 7, 2020	Manchester	Vermont	A truck drove through a roundabout where protesters were kneeling.
June 7, 2020	Pensacola	Florida	A car drove through a picket line of protesters, carrying one of them. The protester was arrested for damaging the car's side mirror.
June 7, 2020	Ventura	California	A pick-up truck allegedly hit a pedestrian, then drove away. Ventura police deemed it an accident.
June 8, 2020	Greenville	South Carolina	A car drove towards protesters outside of a restaurant in Greenville. Protesters had been gathered there after the restaurant's owner made racist comments on Facebook.
June 8, 2020	Indianapolis	Indiana	A 68-year-old woman was arrested for driving her minivan into a group of protesters at Monument Circle.
June 10, 2020	Seattle	Washington	A car drove into a group of cyclists gathered in front of the Seattle Police Department's west precinct. Some minor injuries were reported and one bike was destroyed.
June 11, 2020	Bath	Maine	A pick-up truck drove through a crowd of 20 to 30 people. Protesters reported the incident as a hit-and-run.
June 13, 2020	Richmond	Virginia	A police vehicle hit protesters near the Robert E. Lee statue on Monument Avenue.
June 16, 2020	Dallas	Texas	A driver hit a protester with his car before exiting and pulling out a firearm.
June 17, 2020	Louisville	Kentucky	Police say a car hit a protester after demonstrators engaged with the driver. The driver later had a gun pulled on them.
June 17, 2020	Portland	Oregon	Three people were injured after a car was driven into protesters. The driver was arrested.
June 20, 2020	Santa Rosa	California	A woman was pursued by an unknown individual riding a bicycle, who proceeded to assault her before fleeing, after the driver had driven through a protest. Police say that the woman did not intend to drive into the protest, while demonstrators dispute this.
June 21, 2020	Tampa	Florida	A car drove through protesters at Hyde Park, hitting the organizer of the event.
June 27, 2020	Austin	Texas	A car drove up to protesters outside of the Austin Police Department and waved a gun at them. He was taken into custody but later released
June 27, 2020	Tampa	Florida	A protester was hit by a motorist at Hyde Park. The protester was later arrested, but had his charges dropped. The incident occurred days after a separate incident, also at Hyde Park.
June 28, 2020	Detroit	Michigan	Protester Jae Bass was struck by a police car. Video shows Bass jumping onto the hood to avoid being run over.
June 29, 2020	Lawrence	Kansas	Two separate incidents of cars driving into protests occurred on Massachusetts Street.
June 29, 2020	Provo	Utah	The driver of an SUV was shot while driving through a protest. Three people were arrested in connection with the incident.
June 30, 2020	Ackley	Iowa	A man was hit but not injured by a vehicle transporting Iowa governor Kim Reynolds.
July 4, 2020	Mishawaka	Indiana	A car drove through protesters on the Main Street bridge. One man was dragged about 50 feet.
July 4, 2020	Seattle	Washington	A car drove into protesters on Interstate 5. One person, Summer Taylor, was killed, and another was seriously injured. The driver, Dawit Kalete, was later arrested.
July 4, 2020	Seattle	Washington	An off-duty officer drove her vehicle through a crowd of protesters. The Seattle Police Department later stated that the officer was no longer employed by the department.
July 5, 2020	West Haven	Connecticut	Two cars drove through a crowd in West Haven, hospitalizing two people.
July 6, 2020	Bloomington	Indiana	A 66-year-old woman was arrested for driving her car into protesters, causing two injuries.
July 6, 2020	Huntington Station	New York	A man was arrested for striking two protesters with his car.
July 7, 2020	Newton	Massachusetts	Newton Mayor Ruthanne Fuller says that a man drove "aggressively" towards a group of peaceful protesters outside of Newton's City Hall.
July 15, 2020	Penn Hills	Pennsylvania	A 63-year-old man was arrested for driving through protesters at an intersection.
July 25, 2020	Anaheim	California	A police cruiser hit a protester and drove away. The Anaheim Police Department claimed the incident was an accident and the vehicle drove away because of approaching protesters.
July 25, 2020	Aurora	Colorado	A Jeep was driven through a crowd of people protesting the killing of Elijah McClain on a highway, hitting a pickup truck. One protester shot at the Jeep, instead hitting two other protesters. He was arrested in connection with the incident.
July 25, 2020	Austin	Texas	Murder of Garrett Foster: A motorist who had previously expressed disdain for protesters and has a history of racism and violence turned aggressively through an intersection filled with protesters, shooting and killing one of them when confronted; The armed victim was the sole caretaker of his quadruple amputee fiancé of ten years and had expressed anti-racist, libertarian, and anti-police views in his Facebook posts.
August 21, 2020	Iowa City	Iowa	Two cars hit protesters in separate incidents, injuring one.
August 21, 2020	Troy	New York	Two people were hit by a motorist during a March in Troy. The driver was arrested and charged with reckless endangerment.
August 23, 2020	Bloomington	Indiana	A car turning onto Walnut Street did not stop or slow down despite protesters occupying the road.
September 3, 2020	New York City	New York	A car hit protesters in Times Square that were protesting the death of Daniel Prude.
September 3, 2020	Richmond	Indiana	A car drove into a protest, hitting two people.
September 12, 2020	Johnson City	Tennessee	A white car hit a group of protesters in Downtown Johnson City.
September 14, 2020	Sacramento	California	A California Highway Patrol cruiser hit protesters outside McClellan Airport. Another incident occurred with a civilian vehicle.
September 23, 2020	Buffalo	New York	A pick-up truck drove through a crowd of people that were gathered to protest no charges being filed for the killing of Breonna Taylor. One person was injured.
September 23, 2020	Denver	Colorado	A protester was hit by a motorist during a demonstration for Breonna Taylor.
September 23, 2020	Laramie	Wyoming	A police sergeant hit a protester with her police vehicle. The man hit was uninjured.
September 24, 2020	Los Angeles	California	A pick-up truck struck a protester in Hollywood. The driver was detained by police.
September 25, 2020	Albuquerque	New Mexico	A car drove through a crowd in Albuquerque. No injuries were reported.
September 26, 2020	Yorba Linda	California	A car drove through a crowd of counter-protesters who were opposing Black Lives Matter protestors, injuring two people. The driver was arrested and charged with attempted murder.
October 27, 2020	Philadelphia	Pennsylvania	A police officer was struck by a pick-up truck during unrest in Philadelphia over the killing of Walter Wallace. The truck was later found nearby, unoccupied.
October 27, 2020	Seattle	Washington	A person was hit by a motorist during a protest outside the West Precinct. No injuries were reported.

== See also ==
- Waukesha Christmas parade attack
- Killing of Deona M. Knajdek
- Charlottesville car attack
- 2016 Nice truck attack
