= Jerome R. Brigham =

19th century American lawyer and politician

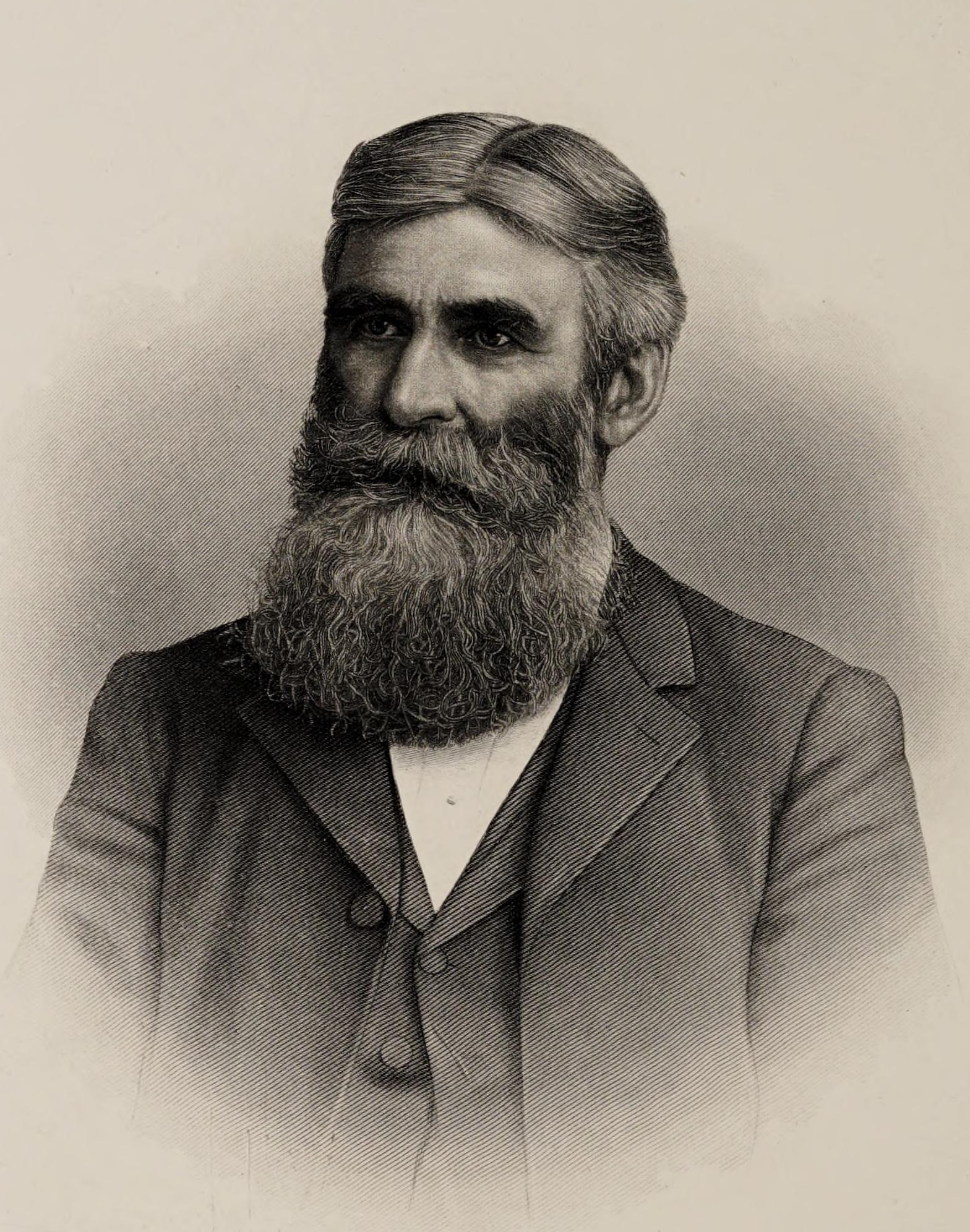

Member of the Wisconsin State Assembly from the Milwaukee 7th district
- In office January 1, 1887 – January 1, 1889
- Preceded by: Jacob Elias Friend
- Succeeded by: Henry Eduard Legler

Personal details
- Born: Jerome Ripley Brigham; July 21, 1825 Fitchburg, Massachusetts
- Died: January 21, 1897 (aged 71) Milwaukee, Wisconsin
- Resting place: Forest Home Cemetery; Milwaukee, Wisconsin
- Party: Republican
- Spouses: Mary Noyes Ilsley; (died 1894)
- Children: Charles Ilsley Brigham^{(b. 1862; died 1948)}; Mary Ripley Brigham^{(b. 1864; died 1936)}; Ellen Deering Brigham^{(b. 1866; died 1871)}; Louise S. Brigham^{(b. 1868; died 1869)}; Mabel Brigham^{(b. 1871; died 1902)}; Katharine (Fox)^{(b. 1876; died 1956)}
- Relatives: Ebenezer Brigham (uncle)
- Education: Amherst College

Jerome Ripley Brigham (July 21, 1825 – January 21, 1897) was an American politician and lawyer.

== Biography ==
Born in Fitchburg, Massachusetts, Brigham moved with his parents to Wisconsin Territory in 1839. His uncle was Ebenezer Brigham who was involved in politics in the Wisconsin Territory. Brigham graduated from Amherst College in 1845 and then taught school and studied law in Madison, Wisconsin. He served in local government as town and village clerk. Then, from 1848 to 1851, Brigham served as clerk of the Wisconsin Supreme Court. In 1851, he moved to Milwaukee, Wisconsin and practiced law. Brigham served on the Milwaukee School Board and the Board of Regents of the University of Wisconsin. He served as city attorney for Milwaukee, Wisconsin. In 1887, Brigham served in the Wisconsin State Assembly. He died in Milwaukee, Wisconsin.
