= George Christiaansen =

American politician

George Christiaansen (born July 14, 1849) was an American politician. He was a Republican member of the Wisconsin State Assembly. He was elected in 1888.

== Biography ==
Christiaansen was born on July 14, 1849. He later moved to Milwaukee, Wisconsin. From 1880 to 1884, he was a member of the Milwaukee Police Department.
