= Frank Avery =

American politician

Frank Avery (1830–1919) was a member of the Wisconsin State Senate and the Wisconsin State Assembly.

== Biography ==
Avery was born on November 17, 1830, in Tenterden, Kent, England. He moved to Syracuse, New York, in 1853 and to Baraboo, Wisconsin, in April 1856.

== Career ==
Avery was a member of the Senate from 1889 to 1892 and of the Assembly from 1887 to 1888. He was also president and a trustee of Baraboo when it was a village. Avery was a Republican.
