= Gaines A. Knapp =

American businessman and politician

Gaines A. Knapp (May 31, 1848 – October 13, 1918) was an American businessman and politician.

Born in Green Bay, Wisconsin, only two days after Wisconsin became America's 30th state, Knapp moved to Oshkosh, Wisconsin in 1848 and went to public school in Oshkosh, Wisconsin. In 1867, Gaines moved to Fond du Lac, Wisconsin. He worked in the banking businessman and was chairman of the board of directors of the First Fond du Lac National Bank. Knapp served as the Fond du Lac City Treasurer and was a Republican. In 1887, Knapp served in the Wisconsin State Assembly. Knapp died at his home in Fond du Lac, Wisconsin.
