= Thomas H. Eviston =

American politician

Thomas H. Eviston (died September 8, 1860) was an American politician and businessman.

Eviston was born to John W. Eviston, Sr. and his wife in Ireland. He was the brother of John W. Eviston, Jr., Thomas Eviston, and Martin J. Eviston. The family first settled in Providence, Rhode Island before moving to Milwaukee, Wisconsin in 1842.

Eviston worked as a lumber dealer, and was the chief engineer of Milwaukee's volunteer fire department. In 1857 he was elected railroad commissioner for Milwaukee's Third Ward. In 1859, he was elected to the Wisconsin State Assembly.

Eviston and his wife died when the Lady Elgin shipwrecked in 1860.
