= Bill Knight (baseball) =

American baseball player

- Rightfielder, Leftfielder and Centerfielder
- Born: August 27, 1972
- Bats: Right Throws: Right

Teams
- UMass Minutemen; Southern Oregon A's; Massachusetts Mad Dogs

William "Bill" John Knight (born August 27, 1972) is an American former baseball player.

== Early life ==
Knight was born on August 27, 1972, his hometown is Fond du Lac, Wisconsin. Knight graduated in 1990 from Holliston High School. He did one post graduate year at Vermont Academy.

== College career ==
Knight played college baseball at UMass Amherst for the UMass Minutemen baseball team. He played in the outfield defensively and was a talented offensive player. As of 2026, Knight is the UMass all-time leader in home runs with 43 in his collegiate career (1992-1995), he is also third in runs at 157, third in hits at 203, and first in total bases at 372.

== Post-college career ==
Knight was drafted by the Oakland Athletics in the 21st round of the 1995 MLB Draft.

After college, he played professionally for the Southern Oregon A's in 1995 and the Massachusetts Mad Dogs in 1996.

== Honors ==
On July 15, 2026, UMass announced that Knight would be inducted into the UMass Athletics Hall of Fame.
