= John Adam (legislator) =

American brewer

Member of the Wisconsin State Assembly
- In office 1887–1887

Personal details
- Born: March 7, 1860 Dienheim, Grand Duchy of Hesse

John Adam (born 1860; date of death unknown) was an American brewer from Milwaukee who served one term as a People's Party member of the Wisconsin State Assembly.

== Background ==
Adam was born in Dienheim, Grand Duchy of Hesse, on March 7, 1860; received a common school education in Germany before emigrating to Wisconsin, United States, in 1874, and settled at Milwaukee, where he continued his education and resided. He became a brewer.

== Elective office ==
Adam was "master workman" of the Gambrinus assembly of the Knights of Labor, but had held no public office until elected to the Assembly in 1886 from the 10th Milwaukee County Assembly district (the 10th Ward of the City of Milwaukee) to succeed Republican Charles Elkert (who was not a candidate for re-election) for the session of 1887. Adam won 1,184 votes to 563 for Republican August Ruggaber and 305 votes for Democrat Charles Nolte. He did not run for re-election in 1888, and was succeeded by Elkert.
