= Joseph Meyers =

American politician

Joseph A. Meyers (born September 13, 1860 in Milwaukee) was a stonecutter from Milwaukee, Wisconsin who served one term as a People's Party member of the Wisconsin State Assembly from Milwaukee.

== Background ==
Meyers was born in the city of Milwaukee, September 13, 1860; received a common school education, and became a stonecutter. He lived in Indianapolis in 1880; in Chicago briefly in 1881; and in Minneapolis, Minnesota for part of 1883–1884, before returning to his native city. He worked with Milwaukee Public Schools after his return, possibly in building and construction.

== Legislative service ==
Meyers was elected to the Assembly for Milwaukee's Sixth Assembly District (the sixth and thirteenth wards of the City of Milwaukee) in 1886 on the Populist ticket, receiving 2,252 votes against 1,217 votes for Republican Paul Vogt; incumbent John Lagrand (a Republican) was not on the ballot. Meyers was assigned to the standing committee on Federal Relations. He was not a candidate for re-election in 1888, being succeeded by Republican Christopher Raesser.

== Personal life ==
At the time of his election, he was single. In 1891, he had a Queen Anne style house built for him at 2363 N. Holton St. in Milwaukee. It was designed by architect Edward V. Koch. As of 2023, it is listed by the Wisconsin Historical Society.
