= Theodore Rudzinski =

American politician

Theodore Rudzinski (January 5, 1857 - ?) was an American real estate and insurance agent from Milwaukee, Wisconsin who spent one term as a People's Party member of the Wisconsin State Assembly from Milwaukee County's Fifth Assembly district.

== Background ==
Rudzinski was born in Neumark, Marienwerder, Prussia on January 5, 1857. His family came to Wisconsin in 1859 and settled at Milwaukee on Christmas Eve, 1859. He was educated in St. Mary's parish school in Milwaukee, and graduated from St. Gall's Academy, Milwaukee, and Spencerian Business College of Milwaukee. He became a real estate, insurance and steamboat agent, and lived for seven months in Chicago.

== Elective office ==
He served on the Milwaukee Common Council as alderman of the 12th Ward from 1883 to 1836, and was re-elected in April, 1886, for another three-year term. He was elected to the Assembly's Fifth Milwaukee County district (the 5th and 12th Wards of the City of Milwaukee) in 1886 for the session of 1887, with 1,705 votes to 832 votes for Republican D. W. Chipman, 759 votes for incumbent Daniel Hooker (who had served two terms as a labor Trades Assembly member but was now seeking re-election as a Democrat), and 18 votes for Prohibitionist J. Y. Wolf. He was assigned to the standing committee on public improvements.

Rudzinski did not run for re-election. He was succeeded by Republican Henry Siebers. He remained a justice of the peace as of 1889. As of 1900, he was still a Milwaukee alderman, and in 1907 he was named in the lawsuit which claimed that he, his colleagues on the Common Council, Mayor David S. Rose and others had made a corrupt deal in 1900 to grant electric railway franchises to The Milwaukee Electric Railway and Light Company.

== After the Assembly ==
In 1897, it was reported that Rudzinski had made arrangements with the Peshtigo Company to buy 12,000 acres (4,900 ha) near Beaver Creek (just south of Crivitz, on which 400 Polish families from Milwaukee, Chicago and Europe were to form a colony. By 1901, he was running ads in Polish language newspapers such as Dziennik Chicagoski and Zgoda in Chicago and Milwaukee.
