= William J. McElroy =

American lawyer and politician

William J. McElroy (January 8, 1856 - June 3, 1937) was an American lawyer from Milwaukee, Wisconsin who served in the Wisconsin State Assembly and on the University of Wisconsin's Board of Regents and Board of Visitors.

== Background ==
McElroy was born in Berlin, Wisconsin (in Green Lake county), on January 8, 1856. He attended public school, and became an attorney.

== Public office ==
In April 1885, he was appointed as a court commissioner. In 1886, he was elected for the Assembly's 4th Milwaukee County district (the Fourth Ward of the City of Milwaukee) as a Republican, with 1,444 votes to 1,335 votes cast for Timothy Cruice, Democratic and People's Party nominee, and 71 votes for Prohibitionist W. A. Arnold, succeeding fellow Republican Robert W. Pierce. He served as chairman of the standing committee on State Affairs, and on the joint committee on apportionment of the state. He was re-elected in 1888 for the thirty-ninth Assembly (his district now included the new 16th Ward of Milwaukee), with 2,059 votes to 1,460 for Democrat Jacob Knoernchild; 271 votes for C. A. Edmunds of what was now called the Union Labor Party, and 68 votes for Prohibitionist T. Robertson. He became chairman of the standing committee on the judiciary. He was not a candidate in 1890, and was succeeded by another Republican, Orren Thomas Williams.

== Later life ==
McElroy returned to his legal practice. He was appointed to a three-year term on the University of Wisconsin's Board of Regents by Governor Robert M. La Follette; he also served on the university's Board of Visitors, and as president of the Milwaukee bar association. He continued to serve as a Milwaukee County court commissioner, retiring after 52 years in that office, just before his 1937 death at his Milwaukee home after a short illness.
