= William M. Nye =

American politician

William Morgan Nye (28 April 1829 – 22 September 1905) was a member of the Wisconsin State Assembly.

== Biography ==
Nye was born in Herkimer County, New York. He moved with his family to Wisconsin when he was seventeen, settling in the Town of Beloit, Wisconsin. In 1860, Nye married Fannie Miller (1839–1882); the couple had two children.

== Career ==
Nye was a member of the Assembly in 1887. Previously, he had served as Assessor of the Town of Beloit. He was a Republican.
