= Gustav Riemer =

American politician

Gustav J. Riemer (April 26, 1860 - 1922) was an American machinist from Milwaukee, Wisconsin who spent a single two-year term as a People's Party member of the Wisconsin State Assembly.

== Background ==
Riemer was born in Milwaukee on April 26, 1860. He was educated at the private German-English Academy in Milwaukee, and became a machinist.

== Legislative service ==
He had never held any public office (although he was president of his machinists' union) until he was elected to the Assembly on the People's Party ticket in 1886 from the 2nd Milwaukee County Assembly district (the Second Ward of the City of Milwaukee), receiving 1,214 votes to 871 votes for Democrat John C. F. Brand, 853 for Republican F. T. Stuewe, and 1 vote for Prohibitionist E. G. Comstock. (Democratic incumbent George Poppert was not a candidate.) He was assigned to the standing committee on roads and bridges.

He was not a candidate for re-election in 1888, and was succeeded by Republican Frank E. Woller.

== Personal life ==
At the time of his service in the Assembly he was married to Emma Riemer (1860-1910).

He seems to have become involved in speculation in real estate in later years. In 1894, he was involved in arranging the purchase of the Interlachen Hotel on Beaver Lake in Waukesha County, Wisconsin, a transaction which ended up going to the Wisconsin Supreme Court due to a dispute over a verbal contract with the seller (Riemer won). In 1899, he is reported as the vice president of a Milwaukee & Lake Geneva Electric Railway, which was buying right of way for an interurban railroad. By 1903, he was described as a "bridge builder" on the St. Paul Railroad, and as making his home in Oconomowoc.
