= William J. Kershaw =

19th century American politician

William John Kershaw (June 22, 1830 – April 5, 1883) was an Irish American immigrant and Republican politician from Adams County, Wisconsin. He served two years in the Wisconsin Senate and three years in the State Assembly.

Kershaw was born in County Antrim, Ireland. During the American Civil War, he served in the Union Army. Afterwards, Kershaw was a member of the Military Order of the Loyal Legion of the United States. He died in 1883.

== Political career ==
Kershaw was a member of the Assembly from 1867 to 1868 and again in 1875. He was a member of the Senate from 1869 to 1870. Additionally, he was a delegate to the 1868 Republican National Convention.
