= Engrossed bill =

Final version of a legislative bill before its passage is voted upon

An Engrossed Bill, also spelled Ingrossed Bill, was the term used in the Parliament of the United Kingdom and its predecessor parliaments for the copy of a bill which was made after the bill had been through the committee stage but prior to its third reading and final passing from the chamber of origin. A bill that was to be engrossed had been subject to the rigours of legislative discussion and amendment and was not likely to change substantially. Bills were engrossed on a long scroll which were, after royal assent, stored in the parliamentary archives. Engrossing of bills ceased to occur in the British Parliament in 1849.

The term remains in use in the United States Congress. It refers to the formal reprinting of the bill in the form upon which a single chamber will vote final passage, and is ordered at the same time the bill's third reading is ordered. The House prints its engrossed bills on blue paper, while the Senate uses white paper. After passage, the engrossed bill is sent to the other chamber. If passed by both houses, an enrolled bill is produced for presentation to the President.

== See also ==
- Enrolled bill
