= Michael Dunn (politician) =

American politician

Michael Dunn was a member of the Wisconsin State Assembly representing the 1st District of Milwaukee County, Wisconsin. Dunn was elected to the Assembly in 1886 and 1888. He was a Democrat. Dunn was born on March 27, 1859, in Milwaukee, Wisconsin.
