= 35th Wisconsin Legislature =

Wisconsin legislative term for 1882

←	34th	36th	→
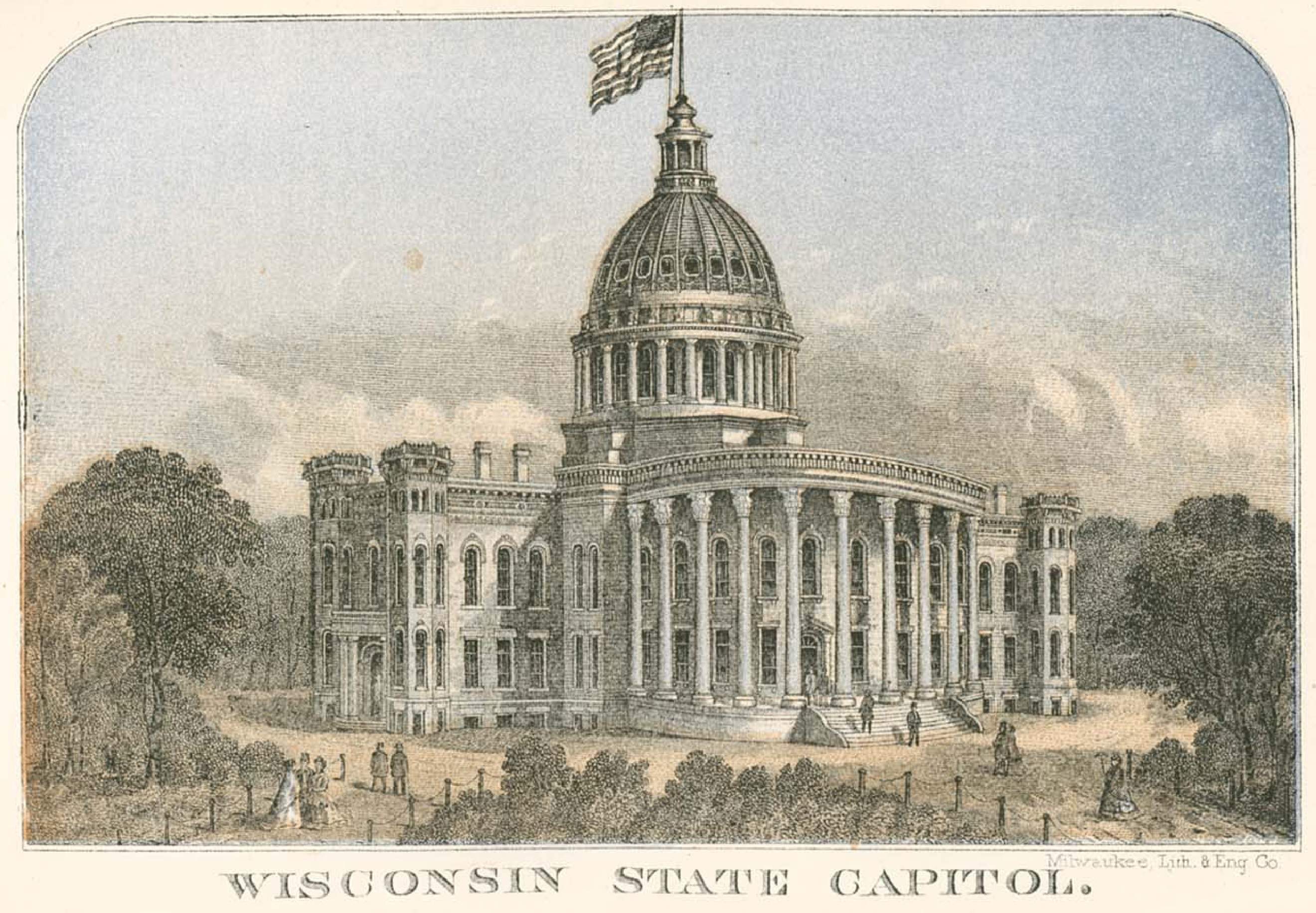
- Wisconsin State Capitol, 1863

Overview
- Legislative body: Wisconsin Legislature
- Meeting place: Wisconsin State Capitol
- Term: January 2, 1882 – January 1, 1883
- Election: November 8, 1881

Senate
- Members: 33
- Senate President: Sam S. Fifield (R)
- President pro tempore: George B. Burrows (R)
- Party control: Republican

Assembly
- Members: 100
- Assembly Speaker: Franklin L. Gilson (R)
- Party control: Republican

Sessions
- 1st: January 11, 1882 – March 31, 1882

The Thirty-Fifth Wisconsin Legislature convened from January 11, 1882, to March 31, 1882, in regular session.

Senators representing even-numbered districts were newly elected for this session and were serving the first year of a two-year term. Assembly members were elected to a one-year term. Assembly members and even-numbered senators were elected in the general election of November 8, 1881. Senators representing odd-numbered districts were serving the second year of their two-year term, having been elected in the general election held on November 2, 1880.

The governor of Wisconsin during this entire term was Republican Jeremiah M. Rusk, of Vernon County, serving the first year of a two-year term, having won election in the 1881 Wisconsin gubernatorial election.

== Major events ==
- January 2, 1882: Inauguration of Jeremiah McLain Rusk as the 15th Governor of Wisconsin.
- May 6, 1882: U.S. President Chester A. Arthur signed the Chinese Exclusion Act, prohibiting immigration from China.
- August 3, 1882: U.S. President Chester A. Arthur signed the Immigration Act of 1882, which created the first U.S. bureaucracy for determining which immigrants would be allowed to settle in the United States.
- November 7, 1882: At the state's general election, Wisconsin voters approved two amendments to the Constitution of Wisconsin.
  - The first amendment removed the word "white" from the section of the constitution which defined eligible voters in the state.
  - The second amendment abolished special elections for county officers and instead gave the Governor power to appoint acting officers when a vacancy occurs, except for the clerks of the circuit court, where appointment power was granted to the circuit court judge. The amendment also standardized all county officer terms, with elections occurring in even-numbered years.

== Major legislation ==
- March 28, 1882: An Act to apportion the state into senate and assembly districts, 1882 Act 242. Redistricted the state legislature following the 1880 United States census.
- March 28, 1882: An Act to apportion the state into congressional districts, 1882 Act 244. Redrew Wisconsin's congressional districts for their new delegation, expanding to 8 seats from 6, following the 1880 United States census.
- Joint Resolution ratifying amendments to section 4 of article VI, section 12 of article VII, and section 1 of article XIII of the constitution of the State of Wisconsin, so as to provide for biennial general elections, 1882 Joint Resolution 3. Second legislative approval of the proposed amendment to the Wisconsin Constitution to standardize county officer terms, and obviate special elections for county officers. The amendment was ratified by voters in the November 1882 general election.
- Joint Resolution in relation to suffrage, 1882 Joint Resolution 5. Second legislative approval of the proposed amendment to the Wisconsin Constitution to strike the word "white" from the section defining eligible voters. The amendment was ratified by voters in the November 1882 general election.

== Party summary ==
=== Senate summary ===
Senate partisan composition Democratic: 10 seats Republican: 23 seats

	Party (Shading indicates majority caucus)		Total	
	Dem.	Rep.	Total	Vacant
End of previous Legislature	9	24	33	0
1st Session	10	23	33	0
Final voting share	30.3%	69.7%		
Beginning of the next Legislature	15	18	33	0

=== Assembly summary ===
Assembly partisan composition Democratic: 34 seats Independent: 2 seats Republican: 64 seats

	Party (Shading indicates majority caucus)					Total	
	Dem.	Gbk.	Lab.	Ind.	Rep.	Total	Vacant
End of previous Legislature	21	0	0	0	79	100	0
1st Session	34	0	0	2	64	100	0
Final voting share	36%				64%		
Beginning of the next Legislature	53	1	2	1	43	100	0

== Sessions ==
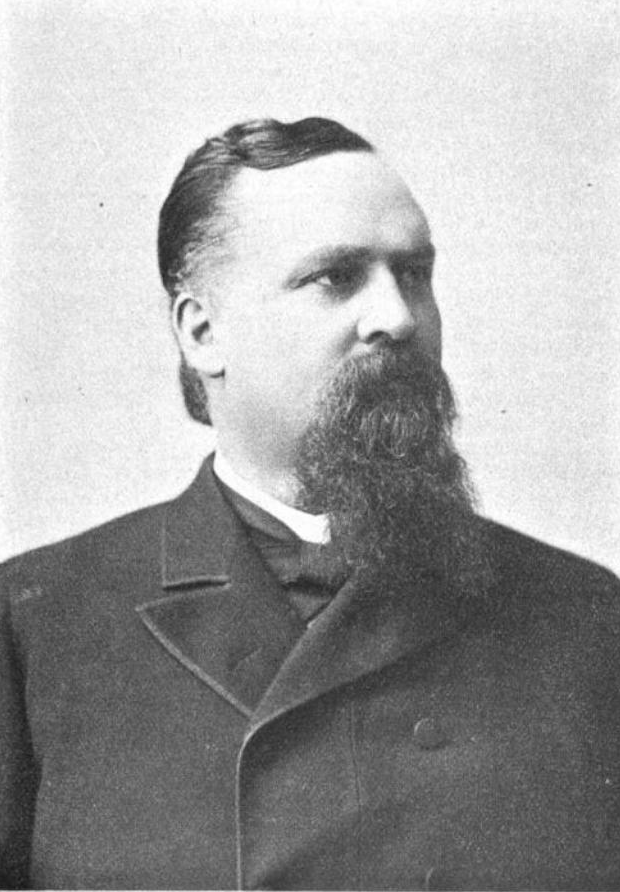
Speaker Franklin L. Gilson.

- 1st Regular session: January 11, 1882 – March 31, 1882

== Leaders ==
=== Senate leadership ===
- President of the Senate: Sam S. Fifield (R)
- President pro tempore: George B. Burrows (R)

=== Assembly leadership ===
- Speaker of the Assembly: Franklin L. Gilson (R)

== Members ==
=== Members of the Senate ===
Members of the Senate for the Thirty-Fifth Wisconsin Legislature:

Senate partisan representation Democratic: 10 seats Republican: 23 seats

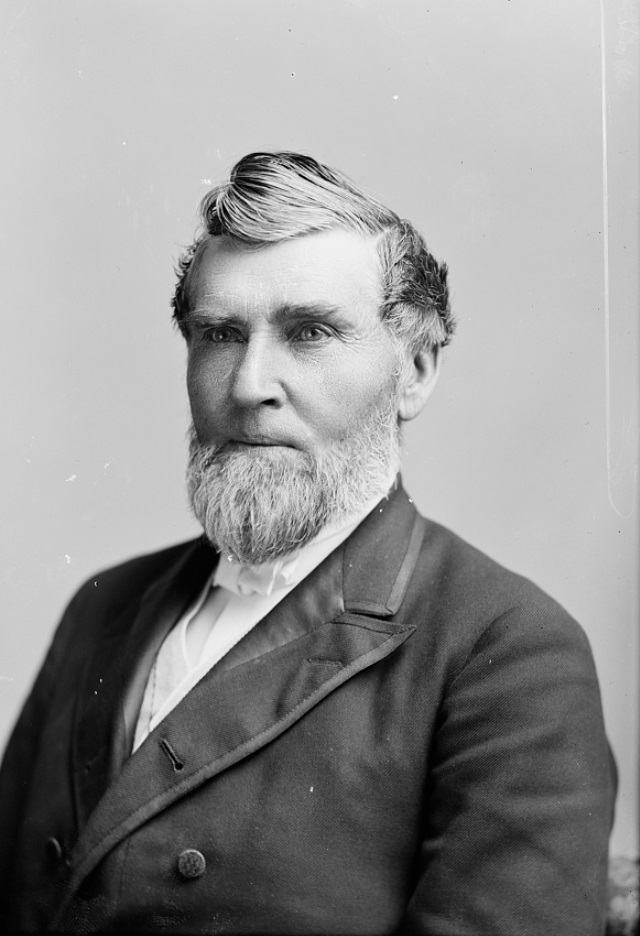
I. W. Van Schaick

Dist.	Counties	Senator	Residence	Party
01	Door, Kewaunee, Langlade, Marinette, Oconto, & Shawano	William A. Ellis	Peshtigo	Rep.
02	Brown	Thomas R. Hudd	Green Bay	Dem.
03	Racine	Albert L. Phillips	Racine	Rep.
04	Crawford & Vernon	Van S. Bennett	Whitestown	Rep.
05	Milwaukee (Northern Part)	Isaac W. Van Schaick	Milwaukee	Rep.
06	Milwaukee (Southern Part)	Enoch Chase	Milwaukee	Dem.
07	Milwaukee (Central Part)	Edward B. Simpson	Milwaukee	Rep.
08	Kenosha & Walworth	Charles Palmetier	Geneva	Rep.
09	Green Lake, Marquette, & Waushara	James F. Wiley	Hancock	Rep.
10	Waukesha	Henry M. Ackley	Oconomowoc	Dem.
11	Chippewa, Clark, Lincoln, Price, Taylor, & Wood	Thomas B. Scott	Grand Rapids	Rep.
12	Green & Lafayette	Archibald N. Randall	Brodhead	Rep.
13	Dodge	Arthur K. Delaney	Mayville	Dem.
14	Juneau & Sauk	John T. Kingston	Necedah	Rep.
15	Manitowoc	Joseph Rankin	Manitowoc	Dem.
16	Grant	George W. Ryland	Lancaster	Rep.
17	Rock	Hamilton Richardson	Janesville	Rep.
18	Fond du Lac (Western Part)	Edward Colman	Fond du Lac	Rep.
19	Winnebago	Joseph B. Hamilton	Neenah	Rep.
20	Sheboygan & Eastern Fond du Lac	Patrick H. Smith	Plymouth	Dem.
21	Marathon, Portage, & Waupaca	Charles F. Crosby	Wausau	Rep.
22	Calumet & Outagamie	John L. Pingel	Appleton	Dem.
23	Jefferson	Frederick Kusel	Watertown	Dem.
24	Ashland, Barron, Bayfield, Burnett, Douglas, Polk, & St. Croix	James Hill	Warren	Rep.
25	Dane (Eastern Part)	George B. Burrows	Madison	Rep.
26	Dane (Western Part)	John Adams	Black Earth	Dem.
27	Adams & Columbia	Gilbert E. McKeeby	Lodi	Rep.
28	Iowa & Richland	William C. Meffert	Arena	Rep.
29	Buffalo, Pepin, & Trempealeau	Augustus F. Finkelnburg	Fountain City	Rep.
30	Dunn, Eau Claire, & Pierce	Rockwell J. Flint	Menomonie	Rep.
31	La Crosse	Merrick Wing	La Crosse	Rep.
32	Jackson & Monroe	Charles K. Erwin	Tomah	Rep.
33	Ozaukee & Washington	George F. Hunt	West Bend	Dem.

=== Members of the Assembly ===
Members of the Assembly for the Thirty-Fifth Wisconsin Legislature:

Assembly partisan composition Democratic: 34 seats Independent: 2 seats Republican: 64 seats

Senate District	County	Dist.	Representative	Party	Residence
27	Adams		Solon Pierce	Rep.	Friendship
24	Ashland, Barron, Bayfield, Burnett, Douglas, & Polk		George D. McDill	Rep.	Osceola
02	Brown	1	John M. Hogan	Rep.	Green Bay
02	Brown	2	Albert L. Gray	Dem.	Fort Howard
02	Brown	3	Patrick H. Moran	Dem.	Morrison
29	Buffalo & Pepin	1	Martin W. McDonnell	Ind.	Alma
29	Buffalo & Pepin	2	Nathaniel O. Murray	Rep.	Pepin
22	Calumet		Adolph Moeller	Rep.	New Holstein
11	Chippewa & Price		William B. Bartlett	Rep.	Chippewa Falls
11	Clark, Lincoln, Taylor & Wood		Robert MacBride	Dem.	Neillsville
27	Columbia	1	William T. Parry	Rep.	Portage
27	Columbia	2	William H. Proctor	Rep.	Fall River
04	Crawford		Atley Peterson	Rep.	Soldiers Grove
26	Dane	1	Fritz Elver	Dem.	Middleton
25	Dane	2	Elisha W. Keyes	Rep.	Madison
25	Dane	3	Francis L. Warner	Rep.	Medina
13	Dodge	1	William Jeche	Dem.	Hustisford
13	Dodge	2	Benjamin P. Bishop	Dem.	Brownsville
13	Dodge	3	Samuel C. McDowell	Rep.	Fox Lake
13	Dodge	4	Thomas J. Jones	Dem.	Beaver Dam
01	Door		Adelbert D. Thorp	Rep.	Sturgeon Bay
30	Dunn		Edward L. Everts	Rep.	Fall Creek
30	Eau Claire		Thomas Carmichael	Dem.	Eau Claire
18	Fond du Lac	1	Ezekiel Babcock	Rep.	Ripon
18	Fond du Lac	2	John Meiklejohn	Rep.	Fond du Lac
18	Fond du Lac	3	Charles E. Shepard	Rep.	Fond du Lac
20	Fond du Lac	4	Louis Eidemiller	Dem.	Lamartine
16	Grant	1	James Cabanis	Rep.	Smelser
16	Grant	2	Daniel B. Stevens	Rep.	Cassville
16	Grant	3	Edward I. Kidd	Rep.	Millville
12	Green	1	Hiram Gabriel	Rep.	York
12	Green	2	John Bolender	Rep.	Monroe
09	Green Lake		Charles D. McConnell	Rep.	Brooklyn
28	Iowa	1	James Ryan	Dem.	Ridgeway
28	Iowa	2	Jefferson Rewey	Rep.	Mifflin
32	Jackson		William T. Price	Rep.	Black River Falls
23	Jefferson	1	Jesse Stone	Rep.	Watertown
23	Jefferson	2	Jacob Leonardson	Rep.	Waterloo
23	Jefferson	3	James W. Ostrander	Rep.	Jefferson
14	Juneau	1	George W. Bishop	Rep.	Wonewoc
14	Juneau	2	Charles D. Loomis	Dem.	Necedah
08	Kenosha		John B. Vosburgh	Rep.	Randall
01	Kewaunee		William Rogers	Dem.	Carlton
31	La Crosse		Frank Pooler	Rep.	Onalaska
11	Lafayette	1	Albert O. Chamberlain	Rep.	Darlington
11	Lafayette	2	John O'Neill	Dem.	Shullsburg
15	Manitowoc	1	Peter Philipps	Rep.	Meeme
15	Manitowoc	2	Henry Goedjen	Dem.	Two Rivers
15	Manitowoc	3	Charles E. Estabrook	Rep.	Manitowoc
21	Marathon		John C. Clarke	Dem.	Wausau
09	Marquette		Samuel Tanner	Dem.	Westfield
05	Milwaukee	1	Arthur Bate	Rep.	Milwaukee
07	Milwaukee	2	George A. Abert	Dem.	Milwaukee
07	Milwaukee	3	Edward Keogh	Dem.	Milwaukee
07	Milwaukee	4	George P. Harrington	Dem.	Milwaukee
06	Milwaukee	5	William Lindsay	Rep.	Milwaukee
05	Milwaukee	6	Carl Zabel	Ind.	Milwaukee
07	Milwaukee	7	William S. Stanley	Rep.	Milwaukee
06	Milwaukee	8	Francis J. Borchardt	Dem.	Milwaukee
05	Milwaukee	9	Arnold Huchting	Dem.	Milwaukee
05	Milwaukee	10	Charles Fingado	Rep.	Wauwatosa
06	Milwaukee	11	William M. Williams Jr.	Rep.	Oak Creek
32	Monroe	1	Mason A. Thayer	Rep.	Sparta
32	Monroe	2	William A. Barber	Rep.	Warrens
01	Langlade, Marinette, Oconto & Shawano		George W. DeLano	Rep.	Pensaukee
22	Outagamie	1	Humphrey Pierce	Dem.	Appleton
22	Outagamie	2	A. H. Pape	Dem.	New London
33	Ozaukee		Frederick W. Horn	Dem.	Cedarburg
30	Pierce		Franklin L. Gilson	Rep.	Ellsworth
21	Portage		Charles A. Lane	Rep.	Plover
03	Racine	1	Richard P. Howell	Rep.	Racine
03	Racine	2	Adam Apple	Dem.	Norway
28	Richland	1	James Washburn	Rep.	Rockbridge
28	Richland	2	George H. Tate	Rep.	Viola
17	Rock	1	John Huntly	Rep.	Avon
17	Rock	2	John Winans	Dem.	Janesville
17	Rock	3	John Conley	Rep.	Clinton
14	Sauk	1	Abijah Beckwith	Rep.	Bear Creek
14	Sauk	2	William S. Grubb	Rep.	Baraboo
20	Sheboygan	1	Wilbur M. Root	Dem.	Sheboygan
20	Sheboygan	2	Simon Gillen	Dem.	Cascade
20	Sheboygan	3	John Marshall	Rep.	Adell
24	St. Croix		Oluf A. Saugestad	Ind.R.	Baldwin
29	Trempealeau		George H. Smith	Rep.	Galesville
04	Vernon	1	Torger Juve	Rep.	Utica
04	Vernon	2	Thomas J. Shear	Rep.	Hillsboro
08	Walworth	1	Walter G. Derthick	Rep.	Spring Prairie
08	Walworth	2	John W. Brownson	Rep.	Sharon
08	Walworth	3	Donald Stewart	Rep.	Sugar Creek
33	Washington	1	Densmore Maxon	Dem.	Polk
33	Washington	2	Joseph W. Holehouse	Dem.	Barton
10	Waukesha	1	William Langer	Rep.	Waukesha
10	Waukesha	2	Herman Schatz	Dem.	Brookfield
21	Waupaca	1	Josephus Wakefield	Rep.	Fremont
21	Waupaca	2	Charles A. Davis	Rep.	Bear Creek
09	Waushara		Nathaniel W. Milliken	Ind.R.	Saxeville
19	Winnebago	1	Andrew Haben	Dem.	Oshkosh
19	Winnebago	2	A. H. F. Krueger	Dem.	Neenah
19	Winnebago	3	George H. Buckstaff	Rep.	Oshkosh
19	Winnebago	4	Thomas J. Bowles	Rep.	Utica

== Employees ==
=== Senate employees ===
- Chief Clerk: Charles E. Bross
  - Assistant Clerk: Chauncey H. Cooke
  - Bookkeeper: Oliver Munson
  - Engrossing Clerk: H. R. Rawson
  - Enrolling Clerk: J. W. Bintliff
  - Transcribing Clerk: Fred J. Turner
  - Proofreader: Frank A. Flower
  - Clerk for the Judiciary Committee: Charles B. Miller
  - Clerk for the Committee on Enrolled Bills: J. J. Crawford
  - Document Clerk: Frank Hutson
- Sergeant-at-Arms: A. T. Glaze
  - Assistant Sergeant-at-Arms: George S. Read
- Postmaster: Curtis M. Treat
  - Assistant Postmaster: Ole Olsen
- Gallery Attendant: Claus Johnson
- Doorkeepers:
  - G. W. Churchill
  - John C. Friswold
  - Joseph A. Walker
  - H. C. Graffam
- Porter: O. L. Wright
- Night Watch: George F. Witter Jr.
- Janitor: Ole Stephenson
- President's Messenger: Ben S. Smith
- Chief Clerk's Messenger: William P. Hyland
- Messengers:
  - John Bohn
  - Adolph Roeder
  - Samuel A. Wilder
  - Charles G. Moll
  - Will A. Blessing
  - Forest McKay
  - Emile Fargeot

=== Assembly employees ===
- Chief Clerk: Edwin Coe
  - 1st Assistant Clerk: John W. DeGroff
    - 2nd Assistant Clerk: T. W. Golden
  - Bookkeeper: J. T. Huntington
  - Engrossing Clerk: M. Sellers
  - Enrolling Clerk: L. J. Burlingame
  - Transcribing Clerk: A. C. Morse
  - Proofreader: C. E. Parish
- Sergeant-at-Arms: David E. Welch
  - Assistant Sergeant-at-Arms: G. L. Miller
- Postmaster: F. A. Ames
  - Assistant Postmaster: W. A. Meiklejohn
- Doorkeepers:
  - J. Granvogl
  - Patrick Mead
  - C. H. Russell
  - Henry Fitzgerald
- Gallery Attendant: B. H. Barnson
- Night Watch: Christopher Jerde
- Wash Room Attendant: A. J. Barsantee
- Speaker's Messenger: L. M. Steiner
- Chief Clerk's Messenger: Thomas McGovern
- Messengers:
  - Thomas Wilkinson
  - Carl Lawrence
  - R. C. Odell
  - George Ransom
  - J. S. Sturtevant
  - Wener Presentin
  - Charles Smith
  - D. C. Owen
  - Fred Buckley
