= 36th Wisconsin Legislature =

Wisconsin legislative term for 1883-1884

←	35th	37th	→
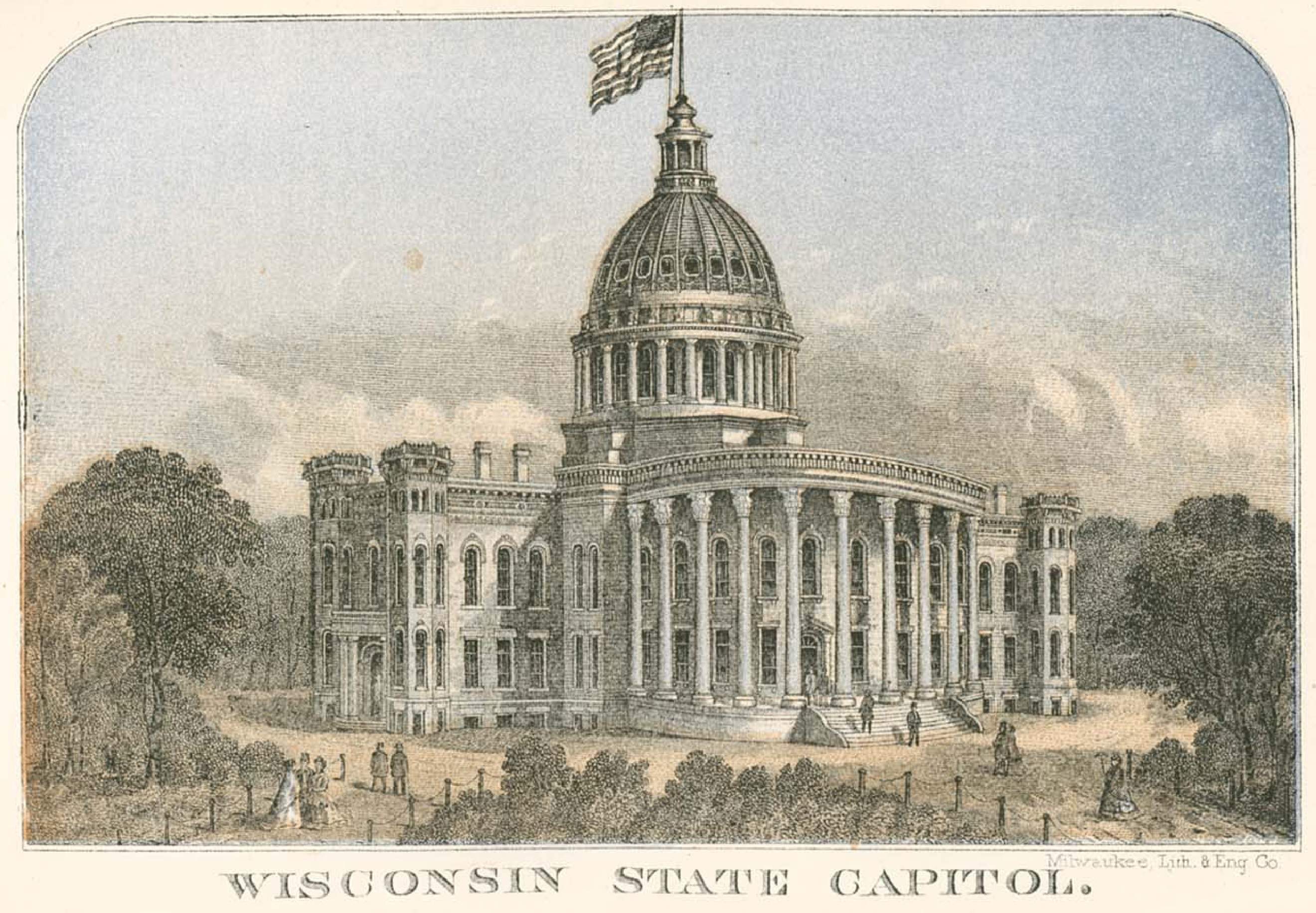
- Wisconsin State Capitol, 1863

Overview
- Legislative body: Wisconsin Legislature
- Meeting place: Wisconsin State Capitol
- Term: January 1, 1883 – January 5, 1885
- Election: November 7, 1882

Senate
- Members: 33
- Senate President: Sam S. Fifield (R)
- President pro tempore: George W. Ryland (R)
- Party control: Republican

Assembly
- Members: 100
- Assembly Speaker: Earl Finch (D)
- Party control: Democratic

Sessions
- 1st: January 10, 1883 – April 4, 1883

The Thirty-Sixth Wisconsin Legislature convened from January 10, 1883, to April 4, 1883, in regular session.

This was the first legislative session after the redistricting of the Senate and Assembly according to an act of the previous session.

This session also saw the implementation of an 1881 amendment to the Constitution of Wisconsin. The amendment converted the Legislature from annual sessions to biennial sessions, and doubled the length of terms for legislative officeholders.

Senators representing odd-numbered districts were newly elected for this session and were serving the first two years of a four-year term. Assembly members were elected to a two-year term. Assembly members and odd-numbered senators were elected in the general election of November 7, 1882. Senators representing even-numbered districts had been elected in the general election of November 8, 1881, and their term was extended from two years to three years, with the end of their term coinciding with the end of this (36th) legislative term.

The governor of Wisconsin during this entire term was Republican Jeremiah M. Rusk, of Vernon County, serving the second year of a two-year term, having won election in the 1881 Wisconsin gubernatorial election.

== Major events ==
- January 10, 1883: The Newhall House Hotel Fire in Milwaukee killed 73 people, including former Wisconsin state senator and judge George B. Reed.
- January 20, 1883: The 1883 Tehachapi train wreck resulted in 15 deaths, including former Wisconsin congressman Charles H. Larrabee.
- October 15, 1883: The United States Supreme Court decided the Civil Rights Cases, striking down parts of the Civil Rights Act of 1875 and permitting individuals and corporations to discriminate based on race.
- November 8, 1883: The partially-constructed south wing of the Wisconsin State Capitol collapsed, killing six laborers and wounding 15 others.
- November 15, 1883: The United States and Canada implemented five standard time zones for the North American continent.
- April 20, 1884: Pope Leo XIII published the encyclical Humanum genus, denouncing Freemasonry and certain liberal beliefs which he considered to be associated with it.
- May 1, 1884: The eight-hour workday was proclaimed by the Federation of Organized Trades and Labor Unions in the United States. The date would later become recognized in nearly every industrialized country as May Day or Labour Day.
- October 22, 1884: The International Meridian Conference in Washington, D.C., established the Greenwich meridian as the prime meridian.
- November 4, 1884: 1884 United States general election:
  - Grover Cleveland elected President of the United States.
  - Jeremiah McLain Rusk re-elected as Governor of Wisconsin.
- December 6, 1884: The Washington Monument was completed in Washington, D.C., becoming the tallest structure in the world at that time.

== Major legislation ==
- March 9, 1883: An Act relating to electors and general elections, and amendatory of sections 12 and 14, chapter 5, of the revised statutes, 1883 Act 29. Established that eligible voters in Wisconsin can vote in any precinct where they had been residents for at least ten days prior to the election. It also established that a person could be disqualified from voting if they were convicted of bribery, or found to be gambling on election outcomes.
- April 3, 1883: An act to create a bureau of labor statistics, 1883 Act 319.

== Party summary ==
=== Senate summary ===
Senate partisan composition Democratic: 15 seats Republican: 18 seats

	Party (Shading indicates majority caucus)		Total	
	Dem.	Rep.	Total	Vacant
End of previous Legislature	10	23	33	0
Start of 1st Session	15	18	33	0
From April 1883	15	17	32	1
Final voting share	45.45%	51.52%		
Beginning of the next Legislature	13	20	33	0

=== Assembly summary ===
Assembly partisan composition Democratic: 53 seats Greenback: 1 seat Trades Assembly: 2 seats Independent: 1 seat Republican: 43 seats

	Party (Shading indicates majority caucus)					Total	
	Dem.	Gbk.	Trades Assm.	Ind.	Rep.	Total	Vacant
End of previous Legislature	34	0	0	2	64	100	0
1st Session	53	1	2	1	43	100	0
Final voting share	57%				43%		
Beginning of the next Legislature	39	0	0	0	61	100	0

== Sessions ==
- 1st Regular session: January 10, 1883 – April 4, 1883

== Leaders ==
=== Senate leadership ===
- President of the Senate: Sam S. Fifield (R)
- President pro tempore: George W. Ryland (R)

=== Assembly leadership ===
- Speaker of the Assembly: Earl Finch (D)

== Members ==
=== Members of the Senate ===
Members of the Senate for the Thirty-Sixth Wisconsin Legislature:

Senate partisan representation Democratic: 15 seats Republican: 18 seats

Dist.	Counties	Senator	Residence	Party
01	Door, Florence, Kewaunee, Langlade, Marinette, & Oconto	Edward S. Minor	Sturgeon Bay	Rep.
02	Brown	Thomas R. Hudd	Green Bay	Dem.
03	Racine	Charles Jonas	Racine	Dem.
04	Crawford & Vernon	Van S. Bennett	Whitestown	Rep.
05	Milwaukee (Northern Part)	Jedd P. C. Cottrill	Milwaukee	Dem.
06	Milwaukee (Southern Part)	Enoch Chase	Milwaukee	Dem.
07	Milwaukee (Central Part)	William S. Stanley	Milwaukee	Rep.
08	Kenosha & Walworth	Charles Palmetier	Geneva	Rep.
09	Green Lake, Portage, & Waushara	James F. Wiley	Hancock	Rep.
10	Waukesha	Henry M. Ackley	Oconomowoc	Dem.
11	Ashland, Clark, Lincoln, Price, Taylor, & Wood	Charles M. Webb	Grand Rapids	Rep.
12	Green & Lafayette	Archibald N. Randall	Brodhead	Rep.
13	Dodge	Benjamin F. Sherman	Beaver Dam	Dem.
14	Juneau & Sauk	John T. Kingston	Necedah	Rep.
15	Manitowoc	John Carey	Meeme	Dem.
16	Grant	George W. Ryland	Lancaster	Rep.
17	Rock	Simon Lord	Edgerton	Rep.
18	Fond du Lac (Western Part)	Edward Colman	Fond du Lac	Rep.
19	Winnebago	Thomas Wall	Oshkosh	Dem.
20	Sheboygan & Eastern Fond du Lac	Patrick H. Smith	Plymouth	Dem.
21	Marathon, Shawano, & Waupaca	John Ringle	Wausau	Dem.
22	Calumet & Outagamie	John L. Pingel	Appleton	Dem.
23	Jefferson	William W. Reed	Jefferson	Dem.
24	Barron, Bayfield, Burnett, Douglas, Polk, & St. Croix	James Hill	Warren	Rep.
25	Eau Claire, Pepin, & Pierce	Hans Warner	Ellsworth	Rep.
26	Dane	John Adams	Black Earth	Dem.
27	Adams, Columbia & Marquette	William T. Parry	Portage	Rep.
28	Iowa & Richland	William C. Meffert	Arena	Rep.
29	Buffalo & Trempealeau	Noah D. Comstock	Arcadia	Rep.
30	Chippewa & Dunn	Rockwell J. Flint	Menomonie	Rep.
31	La Crosse	Donald A. McDonald	La Crosse	Dem.
32	Jackson & Monroe	Charles K. Erwin	Tomah	Rep.
33	Ozaukee & Washington	Edward R. Blake	Port Washington	Dem.

=== Members of the Assembly ===
Members of the Assembly for the Thirty-Sixth Wisconsin Legislature:

Assembly partisan composition Democratic: 53 seats Greenback: 1 seat Trades Assembly: 2 seats Independent: 1 seat Republican: 43 seats

Senate District	County	Dist.	Representative	Party	Residence
27	Adams & Marquette		Samuel Tanner	Dem.	Westfield
11	Ashland, Lincoln, Price, & Taylor		Peter B. Champagne	Rep.	Merrill
24	Barron, Bayfield, Burnett, & Douglas		Canute Anderson	Rep.	Grantsburg
02	Brown	1	Philip M. Wirth	Dem.	Green Bay
02	Brown	2	James Rasmussen	Rep.	Fort Howard
29	Buffalo		John Tester	Rep.	Alma
22	Calumet & Outagamie	1	James Campion	Dem.	Mackville
22	Calumet & Outagamie	2	A. H. Pape	Dem.	New London
22	Calumet & Outagamie	3	James Lennon	Dem.	Appleton
22	Calumet & Outagamie	4	Thomas Lynch	Dem.	Chilton
30	Chippewa		James A. Taylor	Dem.	Chippewa Falls
11	Clark		Robert MacBride	Dem.	Neillsville
27	Columbia	1	John McKenzie	Rep.	Dekorra
27	Columbia	2	Michael Adams	Rep.	Columbus
04	Crawford		Thomas Curley	Dem.	Bell Center
26	Dane	1	Dexter Curtis	Dem.	Madison
26	Dane	2	Clement Warner	Rep.	Windsor
26	Dane	3	Henry C. Adams	Rep.	Madison
26	Dane	4	Eli Pederson	Rep.	Primrose
26	Dane	5	Bernard Esser	Dem.	Middleton
13	Dodge	1	Jacob Martin	Dem.	Beaver Dam
13	Dodge	2	Eli Hawks	Rep.	Juneau
13	Dodge	3	Henry Spiering	Dem.	Mayville
13	Dodge	4	Gustav Meissner	Dem.	Ashippun
01	Door		Christopher Leonhardt	Rep.	Sturgeon Bay
30	Dunn		Robert Macauley	Rep.	Menomonie
25	Eau Claire		Thomas Carmichael	Dem.	Eau Claire
01	Florence & Marinette		Hiram O. Fairchild	Rep.	Marinette
18	Fond du Lac	1	William W. D. Turner	Rep.	Ripon
18	Fond du Lac	2	James F. Ware	Rep.	Fond du Lac
20	Fond du Lac	3	John Hardgrove	Dem.	Forest
16	Grant	1	Ensign Dickinson	Rep.	Platteville
16	Grant	2	William J. McCoy	Dem.	Lancaster
16	Grant	3	Edward I. Kidd	Rep.	Millville
12	Green	1	Hiram Gabriel	Rep.	York
12	Green	2	John Bolender	Rep.	Monroe
09	Green Lake		Orrin W. Bow	Dem.	Kingston
28	Iowa	1	James Ryan	Dem.	Ridgeway
28	Iowa	2	Richard Kennedy	Dem.	Highland
32	Jackson		Ralza W. Button	Rep.	City Point
23	Jefferson	1	Francis V. Piper	Dem.	Ixonia
23	Jefferson	2	Samuel A. Craig	Dem.	Fort Atkinson
14	Juneau		George W. Bishop	Dem.	Wonewoc
08	Kenosha		Walter Maxwell	Rep.	Somers
01	Kewaunee		Louis Bruemmer	Dem.	Kewaunee
31	La Crosse		John Dawson	Dem.	La Crosse
12	Lafayette	1	James S. Gallagher	Dem.	Gratiot
12	Lafayette	2	John O'Neill	Dem.	Shullsburg
01	Langlade & Oconto		Alexander Brazeau	Dem.	Oconto
15	Manitowoc	1	Joseph Miller	Dem.	Maple Grove
15	Manitowoc	2	Henry Goedjen	Dem.	Two Rivers
15	Manitowoc	3	Wilhelm Albers	Dem.	Centerville
21	Marathon		John E. Leahy	Ind. D.	Wausau
05	Milwaukee	1	John A. Wall	Dem.	Milwaukee
07	Milwaukee	2	George A. Abert	Dem.	Milwaukee
07	Milwaukee	3	Michael P. Walsh	Trades Assm.	Milwaukee
07	Milwaukee	4	Robert W. Pierce	Rep.	Milwaukee
06	Milwaukee	5	Daniel Hooker	Trades Assm.	Milwaukee
05	Milwaukee	6	Frederick Scheiber	Dem.	Milwaukee
07	Milwaukee	7	Jacob E. Friend	Rep.	Milwaukee
06	Milwaukee	8	John Fellenz	Dem.	Milwaukee
05	Milwaukee	9	Frederick C. G. Brand	Dem.	Milwaukee
05	Milwaukee	10	Fred N. Comdohr	Rep.	Milwaukee
05	Milwaukee	11	George Everts	Dem.	Granville
06	Milwaukee	12	Michael J. Egan	Dem.	Franklin
32	Monroe	1	William H. Blyton	Rep.	Sparta
32	Monroe	2	Jay R. Hinckley	Dem.	Tomah
33	Ozaukee		John J. Race	Dem.	Fredonia
25	Pepin		William H. Huntington	Rep.	Durand
25	Pierce		John Day Putnam	Dem.	River Falls
24	Polk		George D. McDill	Rep.	Osceola
09	Portage		Charles A. Lane	Rep.	Plover
03	Racine	1	William P. Packard	Dem.	Racine
03	Racine	2	Adam Apple	Dem.	Norway
28	Richland		Charles G. Thomas	Rep.	Buena Vista
17	Rock	1	John Huntly	Rep.	Avon
17	Rock	2	William B. Britton	Rep.	Janesville
17	Rock	3	John Conley	Rep.	Clinton
14	Sauk	1	Carl C. Kuntz	Ind.	Sauk City
14	Sauk	2	William S. Grubb	Rep.	Baraboo
21	Shawano		Herman Naber	Ind. D.	Shawano
20	Sheboygan	1	Tarrett C. Sharp	Dem.	Elkhart Lake
20	Sheboygan	2	Alfred L. Swart	Dem.	Plymouth
20	Sheboygan	3	George W. Weeden	Dem.	Wilson
24	St. Croix		James Johnston	Rep.	Boardman
29	Trempealeau		Robert Cance	Rep.	Ettrick
04	Vernon	1	Christian Ellefson	Gbk.	Franklin
04	Vernon	2	Marshall C. Nichols	Rep.	Viroqua
08	Walworth	1	Donald Stewart	Rep.	Sugar Creek
08	Walworth	2	Orris Pratt	Rep.	Spring Prairie
33	Washington	1	George Noller	Dem.	Richfield
33	Washington	2	Philip Schneider	Dem.	Farmington
10	Waukesha		Matthias J. Regan	Dem.	Eagle
21	Waupaca	1	Eliada W. Brown	Rep.	Weyauwega
21	Waupaca	2	George Warren	Dem.	Matteson
09	Waushara		Jacob S. Bugh	Rep.	Wautoma
19	Winnebago	1	Earl Finch	Dem.	Oshkosh
19	Winnebago	2	Peter Vredenburgh	Rep.	Winneconne
19	Winnebago	3	Carlton Foster	Rep.	Oshkosh
11	Wood		George R. Gardner	Rep.	Grand Rapids

== Committees ==
=== Senate committees ===
- Senate Committee on Agriculture
- Senate Committee on Assessment and Collection of Taxes
- Senate Committee on Education
- Senate Committee on Engrossed Bills
- Senate Committee on Enrolled Bills
- Senate Committee on Federal Relations
- Senate Committee on Finance, Banks, and Insurance
- Senate Committee on Incorporations
- Senate Committee on the Judiciary
- Senate Committee on Legislative Expenditures
- Senate Committee on Manufactures and Commerce
- Senate Committee on Military Affairs
- Senate Committee on Privileges and Elections
- Senate Committee on Public Lands
- Senate Committee on Railroads
- Senate Committee on Roads and Bridges
- Senate Committee on State Affairs
- Senate Committee on Town and County Organizations

=== Assembly committees ===
- Assembly Committee on Agriculture
- Assembly Committee on Assessment and Collection of Taxes
- Assembly Committee on Bills on their Third Reading
- Assembly Committee on Cities
- Assembly Committee on Education
- Assembly Committee on Engrossed Bills
- Assembly Committee on Enrolled Bills
- Assembly Committee on Federal Relations
- Assembly Committee on Incorporations
- Assembly Committee on Insurance, Banks, and Banking
- Assembly Committee on the Judiciary
- Assembly Committee on Legislative Expenditures
- Assembly Committee on Lumber and Manufactures
- Assembly Committee on Medical Societies
- Assembly Committee on Militia
- Assembly Committee on Privileges and Elections
- Assembly Committee on Public Improvements
- Assembly Committee on Public Lands
- Assembly Committee on Railroads
- Assembly Committee on Roads and Bridges
- Assembly Committee on State Affairs
- Assembly Committee on Town and County Organization
- Assembly Committee on Ways and Means

=== Joint committees ===
- Joint Committee on Charitable and Penal Institutions
- Joint Committee on Claims
- Joint Committee on Printing

== Changes from the 35th Legislature ==
New districts for the 36th Legislature were defined in 1882 Wisconsin Act 242, passed into law in the 35th Wisconsin Legislature.

=== Senate redistricting ===
==== Summary of changes ====
- 23 Senate districts were left unchanged (or were only renumbered).
- Dane County went from having 2 districts to 1 (26).

==== Partisan implications ====
- Republicans had 18 safe seats, down from 20.
- Democrats had 6 safe seats, no change from the previous map.
- 9 seats were competitive, up from 7.

==== Senate districts ====
after redistricting, changes highlighted

before redistricting

Dist.	35th Legislature	36th Legislature
1	Door, Kewaunee, Langlade, Marinette, Oconto, Shawano counties	Door, Florence, Kewaunee, Langlade, Marinette, Oconto counties
2	Brown County	Brown County
3	Racine County	Racine County
4	Crawford, Vernon counties	Crawford, Vernon counties
5	Northern Milwaukee County	Northern Milwaukee County
6	Southern Milwaukee County	Southern Milwaukee County
7	Central Milwaukee County	Central Milwaukee County
8	Kenosha, Walworth counties	Kenosha, Walworth counties
9	Green Lake, Marquette, Waushara counties	Green Lake, Portage, Waushara counties
10	Waukesha County	Waukesha County
11	Chippewa, Clark, Lincoln, Price, Taylor, Wood counties	Ashland, Clark, Lincoln, Price, Taylor, Wood counties
12	Green, Lafayette counties	Green, Lafayette counties
13	Dodge County	Dodge County
14	Juneau, Sauk counties	Juneau, Sauk counties
15	Manitowoc County	Manitowoc County
16	Grant County	Grant County
17	Rock County	Rock County
18	Western Fond du Lac County	Western Fond du Lac County
19	Winnebago County	Winnebago County
20	Sheboygan, Eastern Fond du Lac counties	Sheboygan, Eastern Fond du Lac counties
21	Marathon, Portage, Waupaca counties	Marathon, Shawano, Waupaca counties
22	Calumet, Outagamie counties	Calumet, Outagamie counties
23	Jefferson County	Jefferson County
24	Ashland, Barron, Bayfield, Burnett, Douglas, Polk, St. Croix counties	Barron, Bayfield, Burnett, Douglas, Polk, St. Croix counties
25	Eastern Dane County	Eau Claire, Pepin, Pierce counties
26	Western Dane County	Dane County
27	Adams, Columbia counties	Adams, Columbia, Marquette counties
28	Iowa, Richland counties	Iowa, Richland counties
29	Buffalo, Pepin, Trempealeau counties	Buffalo, Trempealeau counties
30	Dunn, Eau Claire, Pierce counties	Chippewa, Dunn counties
31	La Crosse County	La Crosse County
32	Jackson & Monroe counties	Jackson & Monroe counties
33	Ozaukee, Washington counties	Ozaukee, Washington counties

=== Assembly redistricting ===
==== Summary of changes ====
- 51 Assembly districts were left unchanged (or were only renumbered).
- Adams and Marquette counties were combined into a shared district after previously being separate districts.
- Brown County went from having 3 districts to 2.
- Calumet County went from having its 1 district to having 1 whole district and 1 shared district with Outagamie County.
- Chippewa County became its own district after previously having been in a shared district with Price.
- Clark and Wood counties each became their own Assembly districts after previously having been in a shared district with Lincoln and Taylor counties.
- Dane County went from having 3 districts to 5.
- Fond du Lac County went from having 4 districts to 3.
- Jefferson County went from having 3 districts to 2.
- Juneau County went from having 2 districts to 1.
- The northeast corner of the state, comprising Florence, Langlade, Marinette, Oconto, and Shawano counties, went from 1 shared district to 3.
- Milwaukee County went from having 11 districts to 12.
- Pepin County became its own district after previously having been in a shared district with Buffalo County.
- Polk County became its own district after previously having been in a shared district with Ashland, Barron, Bayfield, Burnett, and Douglas counties.
- Walworth County went from having 3 districts to 2.
- Richland County went from having 2 districts to 1.
- Waukesha County went from having 2 districts to 1.
- Winnebago County went from having 4 districts to 3.

==== Assembly districts ====
after redistricting, changes highlighted

before redistricting

County	Districts in 35th Legislature	Districts in 36th Legislature	Change
Adams	1 District	Shared with Marquette	▼
Ashland	Shared with Barron, Bayfield, Burnett, Douglas, Polk	Shared with Lincoln, Price, Taylor	Steady
Barron	Shared with Ashland, Bayfield, Burnett, Douglas, Polk	Shared with Bayfield, Burnett, Douglas	Steady
Bayfield	Shared with Ashland, Barron, Burnett, Douglas, Polk	Shared with Barron, Burnett, Douglas	Steady
Brown	3 Districts	2 Districts	▼
Buffalo	2 shared with Pepin	1 District	▼
Burnett	Shared with Ashland, Barron, Bayfield, Douglas, Polk	Shared with Barron, Bayfield, Douglas	Steady
Calumet	1 District	2 shared with Outagamie	▲
Chippewa	Shared with Price	1 District	▲
Clark	Shared with Lincoln, Taylor & Wood	1 District	▲
Columbia	3 Districts	2 Districts	▼
Crawford	1 District	1 District	Steady
Dane	3 Districts	5 Districts	▲▲
Dodge	4 Districts	4 Districts	Steady
Door	1 District	1 District	Steady
Douglas	Shared with Ashland, Barron, Bayfield, Burnett, Polk	Shared with Barron, Bayfield, Burnett	Steady
Dunn	1 District	1 District	Steady
Eau Claire	1 District	1 District	Steady
Fond du Lac	4 Districts	3 Districts	▼
Grant	3 Districts	3 Districts	Steady
Green	2 Districts	2 Districts	Steady
Green Lake	1 District	1 District	Steady
Iowa	2 Districts	2 Districts	Steady
Jackson	1 District	1 District	Steady
Jefferson	3 Districts	2 Districts	▼
Juneau	2 Districts	1 District	▼
Kenosha	1 District	1 District	Steady
Kewaunee	1 District	1 District	Steady
La Crosse	1 District	1 District	Steady
Lafayette	2 Districts	2 Districts	Steady
Langlade	Shared with Marinette, Oconto, Shawano	Shared with Oconto	Steady
Lincoln	Shared with Clark, Taylor, Wood	Shared with Ashland, Price, Taylor	Steady
Manitowoc	3 Districts	3 Districts	Steady
Marathon	1 District	1 District	Steady
Marinette	Shared with Langlade, Oconto, Shawano	Shared with Florence	Steady
Marquette	1 District	Shared with Adams	▼
Milwaukee	11 Districts	12 Districts	▲
Monroe	2 Districts	2 Districts	Steady
Oconto	Shared with Langlade, Marinette, Shawano	Shared with Langlade	Steady
Outagamie	2 Districts	3 shared with Calumet	▲
Ozaukee	1 District	1 District	Steady
Pepin	Shared with Buffalo	1 District	▲
Pierce	1 District	1 District	Steady
Polk	Shared with Ashland, Barron, Bayfield, Burnett, Douglas	1 District	▲
Portage	1 District	1 District	Steady
Price	Shared with Chippewa	Shared with Ashland, Lincoln, Taylor	Steady
Racine	2 Districts	2 Districts	Steady
Richland	2 Districts	1 District	▼
Rock	3 Districts	3 Districts	Steady
Sauk	2 Districts	2 Districts	Steady
Shawano	Shared with Oconto	1 District	▲
Sheboygan	3 Districts	3 Districts	Steady
St. Croix	1 District	1 District	Steady
Taylor	Shared with Clark, Lincoln, Wood	Shared with Ashland, Lincoln, Price	Steady
Trempealeau	1 District	1 District	Steady
Vernon	2 Districts	2 Districts	Steady
Walworth	3 Districts	2 Districts	▼
Washington	2 Districts	2 Districts	Steady
Waukesha	2 Districts	1 District	▼
Waupaca	2 Districts	2 Districts	Steady
Waushara	1 District	1 District	Steady
Winnebago	4 Districts	3 Districts	▼
Wood	Shared with Clark, Lincoln, Taylor	1 District	▲

== Employees ==
=== Senate employees ===
- Chief Clerk: Charles E. Bross
  - Assistant Clerk: J. W. Bates
  - Bookkeeper: Oliver Munson
  - Engrossing Clerk: Thomas Bright
  - Enrolling Clerk: James T. Greene
  - Transcribing Clerk: Samuel S. Lockhart
  - Proofreader: Willard W. Flinn
  - Clerk for the Judiciary Committee: A. T. E. Blessing
  - Clerk for the Committee on Enrolled Bills: Stephen Thomas
  - Clerk for the Committee on Engrossed Bills: E. S. Hotchkiss
  - Clerk for the Committee on Claims: J. H. Whitney
  - Document Clerk: Thomas Watson
- Sergeant-at-Arms: Adelbert D. Thorp
  - Assistant Sergeant-at-Arms: Charles A. Landridge
- Postmaster: H. C. Spaulding
  - Assistant Postmaster: John J. Marshall
- Gallery Attendant: Claus Johnson
- Committee Room Attendant: A. A. Curtis
- Document Room Attendant: Frank Hutson
- Doorkeepers:
  - Joseph Granvogel
  - H. T. E. Tilleson
  - Jos. S. Adlington
  - Jos. W. Hodges
- Porter: O. L. Wright
- Night Watch: G. W. Churchill
- Janitor: Owen Pritchard
- Messengers:
  - Charlie Adamson
  - Lemuel R. Parry
  - Emile Forgeot
  - Fred. D. Irish
  - Elliot B. Davis
  - A. M. Kneeland
  - Dennie M. Wright

=== Assembly employees ===
- Chief Clerk: Isaac T. Carr
  - 1st Assistant Clerk: James W. Murphy
    - 2nd Assistant Clerk: J. L. O'Connor
  - Bookkeeper: Clarence L. Clark
  - Engrossing Clerk: C. R. Blumenfeld
  - Enrolling Clerk: Charles N. Holden
  - Transcribing Clerk: James Douglas
  - Proofreader: George Stone
  - Clark for the Judiciary Committee: Joseph Roy
  - Clerk for the Committee on Enrolled Bills: W. C. Brawley
  - Clerk for the Committee on Engrossed Bills: J. C. Conners
- Sergeant-at-Arms: Thomas Kennedy
  - Assistant Sergeant-at-Arms: Bernard McGinty
- Postmaster: T. W. Wiebold
  - Assistant Postmaster: William H. Fitzgerald
- Doorkeepers:
  - Byron Abert
  - John D. Bradford
  - O. B. Phelps
- Fireman: Frank Grams
- Gallery Attendants:
  - T. F. McCarty
  - Michael Riedy
- Engrossing Room Attendant: J. B. Rand
- Policeman: John W. Liebenstein
- Night Watch: A. H. Burns
- Wash Room Attendant: Matthew Dunne
- Messengers:
  - W. G. Kropf
  - H. Allman
  - J. F. Donovan
