= Senator Stanley =

Senator Stanley may refer to:

- Arthur Jehu Stanley Jr. (1901–2001), Kansas State Senate
- Augustus Owsley Stanley (1867–1958), Kentucky State Senate
- Bill Stanley (politician) (born 1967), Virginia State Senate
- Brenda Stanley (born 1952), Oklahoma State Senate
- Paul Stanley (Tennessee politician) (born 1962), Tennessee State Senate
- William Stillman Stanley Jr. (1838–?), Wisconsin State Senate
