= Senator Ackley =

Senator Ackley may refer to:

- Edward Ackley (1887–1964), Wisconsin State Senate
- Henry M. Ackley (1827–1912), Wisconsin State Senate
