= Abijah Beckwith =

Abijah Beckwith may refer to:

- Abijah Beckwith (New York politician) (1784–1874), American politician from New York
- Abijah Beckwith (Wisconsin politician) (1843–1897), American politician from Wisconsin
