= Hector H. Perry =

American lawyer

Hector H. Perry was a politician in North Dakota.

== Biography ==
Perry was born on August 20, 1876, in New London, Wisconsin to Ebenezer P. and Caroline J. Perry. He would go on to work in real estate and become a lawyer. In 1900, he married Jennie H. Monty.

== Political career ==
Perry was twice Chairman of the North Dakota Democratic Party. First, from 1914 to 1926, and second, from 1928 to 1931. He had also been a member of the North Dakota Democratic Committee twice. First, from 1912 to 1916, and second, from 1928 to 1936. Perry was a member of the Democratic National Committee from 1926 to 1924 and in 1932. In 1920, he was a candidate for the United States Senate, losing to Edwin F. Ladd. Later, he was U.S. Collector of Internal Revenue of North Dakota from 1933 to 1947.
