= Shamrock Club of Wisconsin =

Irish American membership organization

The Shamrock Club of Wisconsin is the oldest and largest Irish American membership organization in the State of Wisconsin. It was founded on March 17, 1960, in Milwaukee. Currently there are chapters in Milwaukee, Fox Cities (Appleton and Oshkosh), Green Bay and Northeast Wisconsin (Green Bay, Wisconsin), South Central (Baraboo), Dane County, (Madison), New London, La Crosse, and Lafayette County, (Darlington). The Rock County (Beloit and Janesville) chapter folded in 2007.

The Shamrock Club was organized by members of Milwaukee's Irish community who had been a part of the Milwaukee Holiday Folk Fair's annual November festival. Helped by the International Institute of Wisconsin, the Club met to organize on March 17, 1960, St Patrick's Day. A few years later, it would incorporate under Wisconsin corporation laws, and later would receive a federal 501 C (4) as a charitable, social and cultural organization.

The Shamrock Club would gain a foothold in the Irish community by sponsoring and chartering flights to Ireland. These trips were very popular, and there were often multiple trips to Ireland each year. When the chartered flights program started, there was little in the way of direct flights to Ireland, and those that existed were often prohibitively expensive. Changes in the federal laws would take the Shamrock Club out of the charter business, as more commercial airlines saw the growing interest in Ireland to be a viable money making option for them.

== State chapters ==
As interest in the Irish in Wisconsin grew, various chapters came to life across the state. The current chapters include the Shamrock Club of La Crosse in western Wisconsin; Darlington's LaFayette County chapter; New London's Shamrock Club of New Dublin; Dane County based in Madison; the Shamrock Club of Green Bay and Northeast Wisconsin, based in Green Bay; and the South Central Chapter, based in Baraboo and Portage. Fox Cities was revitalized by an influx of native-born Irish in the late 2000s. Some chapters have disappeared, including Twin Lakes and Fond du Lac. The Rock County chapter disbanded in 2007 due to a lack of new members.

Statewide chapters hold monthly meetings, organize Saint Patrick's Day parades, hold various celebrations, raise the flag over the State Capitol, and carry out other Irish-related activities. In the New London club, leprechauns change the town's name to New Dublin for St. Patrick's Day week. All of the chapters are involved in fundraising and have donated thousands of dollars to numerous causes over the past four decades. Chapters print a monthly publication for members of the club.

=== Milwaukee Chapter of the Shamrock Club of Wisconsin ===
The Milwaukee Chapter meets on the first Thursday of each month at the CelticMKE Center, 1532 North Wauwatosa Avenue, Wauwatosa, starting in December 2025. This occurred after the closure of the Irish Cultural and Heritage Center in November 2025.

Milwaukee Saint Patrick's Day activities throughout the year include:

- Gaelic Mass at St. Patrick's Parish, 7th and Washington, on Parade Day
- Parade at noon on Wisconsin Avenue
- Post-Parade party at 1 p.m. at the St. Brigid Center
- Monthly meeting on the first Thursday of the month at 6:30 p.m., CelticMKE
- Visit the Shamrock Club at Milwaukee Irish Fest in the Sales and Cultural Areas
- Representing the Irish at Milwaukee's Holiday Folk Fair in the Cultural and Food areas
- The annual picnic in August
- The Halfway to St. Patrick's Day Mass and Breakfast in September
- Christmas Party and Potluck Dinner
- Emerald Reflections, the monthly newsletter
- Shamrock Club Color Guard Pipes and Drums
- Easter Rising Mass

==== Milwaukee board of directors ====
The 2026-27 board of directors for the Milwaukee chapter is as follows: Past President: Joseph Hughes; President: Josh Walton; Treasurer: Megan Walton Mueller; Membership: Terese Dineen; Sergeant at Arms: Deb Kreuser; Secretary: Ashling Ivers; Vice President: Mike Malloy; Senior Trustee: Gail Hettrick; Trustee: John Avery; Junior Trustee: Pam Canon. Their terms are from July 1, 2026, until June 30, 2027.

==== Shamrock Club Color Guard Pipes and Drums ====
The Shamrock Club Color Guard Pipes and Drums of the Milwaukee chapter carried the colors of the Shamrock Club, Ireland, and various Irish organizations of Wisconsin. They have marched in Dublin, Ireland; San Antonio, Texas; Savannah, Georgia; New Orleans, Louisiana; and New York City. The combination of the Color Guard with the fully augmented pipe band has brought awards and praise to the unit.

Currently, the Color Guard is in reorganization.

== Organizations that grew from the Shamrock Club of Wisconsin ==
Organizations that grew directly or indirectly from the Shamrock Club are Milwaukee Irish Fest, founded in 1981 by Ed Ward, past president of the Shamrock Club; Cashel Academy and Trinity Irish Dancers, formed when the Shamrock Club gave up control of the Shamrock Club Dancers; the Irish Cultural and Heritage Center of Wisconsin, founded by Shamrock Club members as a home for Milwaukee's Irish; and Celtic Women International, and the Conference of Celtic Women, both founded by Jean Bills, who was treasurer of the Shamrock Club at the time.

Other organizations that have been given sponsorship or financial assistance by the Shamrock Club include: Milwaukee School of Piping; the annual Irish Language immersion weekend in Milwaukee each year; Milwaukee Celtic Soccer Club; Milwaukee Hurling Club Shamrock Club Griffins and a youth team; and the Miltown Gaels Gaelic Football team.

== Shamrock Club Scholarships ==
Starting in 1972, the Shamrock Club came up with a scholarship for Irish Studies. Initially it was for students at the University of Wisconsin-Milwaukee. In the early 1970s, the Shamrock Club began fundraising for scholarship funds. This included an Irish film series at the University of Wisconsin Milwaukee Union's Cinema. The funds went to the Shamrock Club Scholarship Fund at the UW Milwaukee Foundation. Individuals in Irish or Irish-related fields of studies were given the scholarship to study in Ireland. Most of the Scholarship Winners came back to the Shamrock Club.

A total of fifteen scholarships were awarded between 1972 and 1996. Scholarship funds were initially $500, but were increased to $1000 in the middle of the 1980s. Unfortunately, the funds were blended into the general UWM Foundation funds, and the scholarship money ran out in 1996. A change in how scholarship money was allocated led to the end of a self-perpetuating fund in 1994.

In 2003, the Scholarship Fund was resurrected by the Shamrock Club, this time managed by the Club itself. The scholarship was set at $500, but the parameters were changed to allow up to five winners per year, from all schools and universities in Wisconsin, or for Wisconsin residents of college age. Since 2003, 48 scholarships were awarded to students across the State of Wisconsin.

The Shamrock Club also administered the Milwaukee Chapter of the Ancient Order of Hibernians scholarship for a number of years.

The Shamrock Club also awarded the Ted Nestor Drumming and Piping Scholarship to Club members only for the Milwaukee School of Piping, until the school's demise. A total of 15 scholarships were award at $500 each.

Starting in 2022, the scholarship was renamed for Irish born UWM professors John Gleeson and James Liddy. (Liddy was also renowned as Beat poet during his time in San Francisco.)

In 2021, the Shamrock Club awarded $250 scholarships to one dancer in each of the Milwaukee area Irish dance schools. In June, 2023, $1000 scholarships were awarded to Mia Gleason from Marquette University, and Reyna Delikat from the University of Wisconsin, Milwaukee. In 2024, UWM Celtic Studies student Leah Mauldin, and Marquette University English major Katie Fograc were awarded $1000 each.

In 2025, three scholarships were awarded. They are: Gwyn Parker; Hanna Swanson and Hailey Fox. All three are students at UW Milwaukee, and two are involved in the Celtic Studies program. One of the scholarships is funded by Frank Miller, in the name of his wife, Mary Ellen Powers. All three received $1,000 each.

Through the end of calendar year 2024, the Shamrock Club has awarded over $50,000 in scholarships in all areas of interest. Many students have used the money to study in Glen Colmcille, County Donegal. Others have attended school at Trinity College, or many of the UC Colleges or the NUI schools in Ireland. Scholarships in the past have been awarded to students who went to the Craobh Curtin Conrad Na Gaeilge Language Immersion School, held each year in Milwaukee.

== Chapter parades and festivals ==
=== Milwaukee St Patrick's Day Parade ===
The Shamrock Club would hold its first St Patrick's Parade in 1967 along Wisconsin Avenue. The parade was under the auspices of bar and restaurant owner Danny O'Donoghue for many years. O'Donoghue, a native of County Cork, was one of the driving forces of the Irish community in Milwaukee and Wisconsin for decades. The parade continued on Wisconsin Avenue until the Wisconsin Avenue's Bridge 1975 rebuilding forced a move to Mitchell Street, on Milwaukee's South Side. The parade was then headed up by Jeanne McCue, in 1976, and then Catherine "Cate" Harris in 1977. She was succeeded by Chuck Ward. The North Avenue Business Association wooed it to North Avenue, where it ran from 53 to 74 Streets, in 1986. Michael Boyle headed up the parade for many years, until he passed the reins to Tim O'Brien and Mick McDermott. The parade crossed two cities, Milwaukee and Wauwatosa.

The parade would later move to Bluemound Road for one year, in 2001, still crossing both the cities of Milwaukee and Wauwatosa. A move to Downtown Milwaukee took place in 2002, which was the beginning of a partnership with the Westown Association, a downtown business association promoting the neighborhood west of the Milwaukee River. The Westown Association brought on Miller Lite in 2003 as presenting sponsor of the parade. During its run in downtown Milwaukee, the Shamrock Club has had Dan Malloy, Mike O'Leary and Kristine Pluskota all as parade directors. Mike Boyle returned in 2009, assisted by daughters Erin Boyle and Meghan Boyle. In 2012 and 2013, the parade was directed by Mike Boyle and Denis Donohoe. Killian's Irish Red, a MiolsonCoors brand, was the lead sponsor in 2013 and 2014.

In 2014, Josh Walton took over the parade. The parade was again led by Michael Boyle starting in 2015 and to the present.

The Shamrock Club of Wisconsin's parade annually draws between 20,000 and 40,000 spectators, who brave all types of weather conditions to watch the parade in either perfect or less than perfect conditions. It is the largest St. Patrick's celebration in the state of Wisconsin. The parade typically features between 110-125 units which include the area's eight Irish dance schools, numerous pipe and drum corps, as well as other community leaders and Irish groups. In 2007, the New York City Police Department debuted in the Milwaukee St. Patrick's Day Parade, bringing a contingent of 95 officers to march. They returned in 2008, with over 100 of NYPD's finest helping Milwaukee celebrate, as well as many members of the New York City Fire Department.22

The 2019 Parade was the 53rd annual, and was held on Saturday, March 9, 2019. And again, as in 2018, it stepped off at MLK and Wisconsin at noon. MillerCoors was the presenting sponsor in 2018. In 2020, the 54th Annual Saint Patrick's Parade was canceled, due to the Covid-19 pandemic. The Parade was due to be held on March 14, but on March 13, the City of Milwaukee, Shamrock Club and Westown jointly announced the cancellation of the parade, and other events held in conjunction with the parade. The parade was delayed in 2021 until September, but with the rise of the Delta Variant, it was again postponed until March 12, 2022. In 2025, the Parade was held on March 15, starting again at Noon. This was the 57th edition of the parade. The 58th parade will take place on Saturday, March 14, 2026, at noon.

There is an annual Mass in Honor of St. Patrick on Parade Day at the historic St Patrick's Church, 7 and Washington. Now mainly a Hispanic parish, it is decorated in Celtic knots and has a statue in honor of St Patrick and its heritage as an Irish immigrant church. The combination of pipes, choir and Gaelic liturgy have made it one of the highlights of the Irish community each St Patrick's Day.

A Post Parade Party has been held at various locations for the past fifty-four years. The most recent home has been the Irish Cultural and Heritage Center, 2133 West Wisconsin Avenue, which is also the home of the Shamrock Club. The event is the largest Parade day family event in Milwaukee, with three Irish dance schools, a Scottish dance school, a dedicated children's education and play area, and a total of four stages. It averages about 1200 attendees each year.

=== Dane County Shamrock Club - Social * Cultural * Charitable ===
Each year, the DCSC hosts its annual Irish Flag Raising Ceremony at the Wisconsin State Capitol building in beautiful downtown Madison, Wisconsin; they honor their Irish Person of the Year; they host a St. Patrick's Day Dinner and a Celtic Christmas Banquet, along with numerous educational and social events throughout the year. The DCSC also provide charitable donations and scholarships to local community groups and individuals.

=== New London - St. Patrick's Day Parade & Irish Fest ===
Each year the Shamrock Club of New Dublin hosts Wisconsin's largest St. Patrick's Day parade with an Irish Fest in New London. The parade typically features multiple bagpipe & marching bands, clown performers, specialty, clan, and business floats. Irish Fest is held in a heated big top tent with several Celtic style bands, food, beverage, and market booths.

A whole week of St. Patrick's Day events starts when club leprechauns rename the town to New Dublin. The events include; an evening of Irish entertainment, an Irish Ceili with a band and caller/teacher, Irish caroling, and an Irish wake parody. Corned beef and cabbage is served in the area in restaurants that week too. The parade and Irish Fest top off the week on Saturday.

Finnegan's Wake is a yearly tradition in 'New Dublin'. It started years ago as a 'lark' when locals in mourning paraded down the main street with a mannequin (Finnegan) in a wicker casket. The parade has grown each year since with Finnegan now riding in a green hearse with faulty door locks that allow him with casket to fly out when the hearse pulls away.

=== La Crosse - St Patrick Day Parade ===
The La Crosse chapter has a St Patrick Day Parade on the Saturday prior to March 17 each year, in downtown La Crosse.

In addition, the La Crosse Chapter also has a number of activities during the week before St Patrick's Day, including caroling at nursing homes.

=== Green Bay St. Patrick Day Parade ===
The Shamrock Club of Green Bay and Northeastern Wisconsin has a parade in downtown Green Bay on the Saturday prior to St. Patrick's Day.

=== Beloit St. Patrick's Day Parade ===
The Rock County Chapter of the Shamrock Club is no longer in existence. The Shamrock club does not have a connection to the Beloit St. Patrick's Day parade any longer. The Beloit St. Patrick's Day Parade took place every year in downtown Beloit. The parade began at the Kerry Group headquarters, a prominent food producer having originated in Ireland, and finished in Beloit's Central Park (Horace White). The parade was held annually on the Friday before St. Patrick's Day.
