= Theodore Knapstein =

American politician

Theodore Knapstein (November 12, 1848 – March 17, 1917) was an American brewer and politician.

Born in Prussia, Knapstein emigrated to the United States in 1855 and settled in the town of Greenville, Outagamie County, Wisconsin. Knapstein then moved to New London, Wisconsin and was a brewer. Knapstein served on the New London Village Board and the New London Common Council; Knapstein served as president of the New London Common Council. He also served as mayor of New London and was a Democrat. In 1889 and 1891, Knapstein served in the Wisconsin State Assembly. Knapstein died in New London, Wisconsin after being in poor health.
