= Marcus Plant =

American lawyer

Marcus L. Plant (November 10, 1911 – July 15, 1984) was an American law professor and athletic administrator. He was a law professor at the University of Michigan and served as president of the NCAA from 1967 to 1968.

Plant was born in New London, Wisconsin. He received his B.A. and M.A. degrees from Lawrence College in 1932 and 1934. He worked as a school teacher for two years before enrolling at the University of Michigan Law School. After graduating from law school in 1938, Plant worked as a lawyer in private practice in Milwaukee and New York, and also in the World War II-era Office of Price Administration.

After the war, Plant joined the faculty of the University of Michigan Law School where he served as a professor for 38 years until his death in 1984. Plant became a nationally recognized expert in the area of workers' compensation and employment rights, torts, the law of medical practice, and medical legal problems. In 1953, he published the book Cases on Torts, and in 1959 he co-authored the treatise The Law of Medicine. He also published a treatise on workers' compensation law. He taught at the University of Michigan Law School from 1946-1984.

From 1954-1978, Plant also served as the University of Michigan's faculty representative to the National Collegiate Athletic Association and the Big Ten Conference. He was the president of the NCAA from 1967-1969 and also served for many years on the NCAA policy-making committees. He was also a member of the U.S. Olympic Committee from 1969-1972. In 1982, Plant retired from active faculty status and became a professor emeritus. Plant died at his home in Ann Arbor, Michigan at age 72.

== See also ==
- University of Michigan Athletic Hall of Honor
