= Mitchell, Wisconsin =

- Town
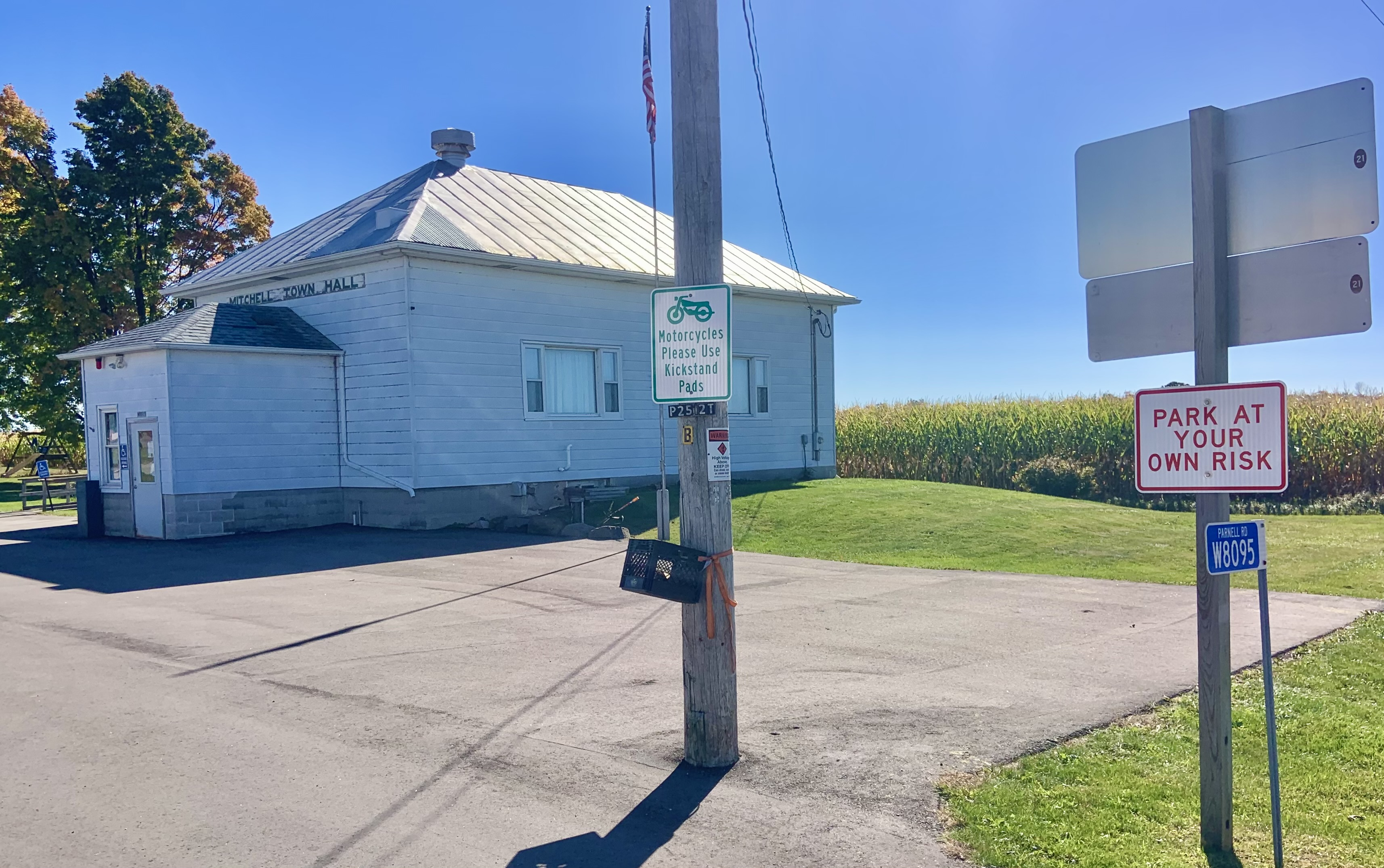
- Town hall

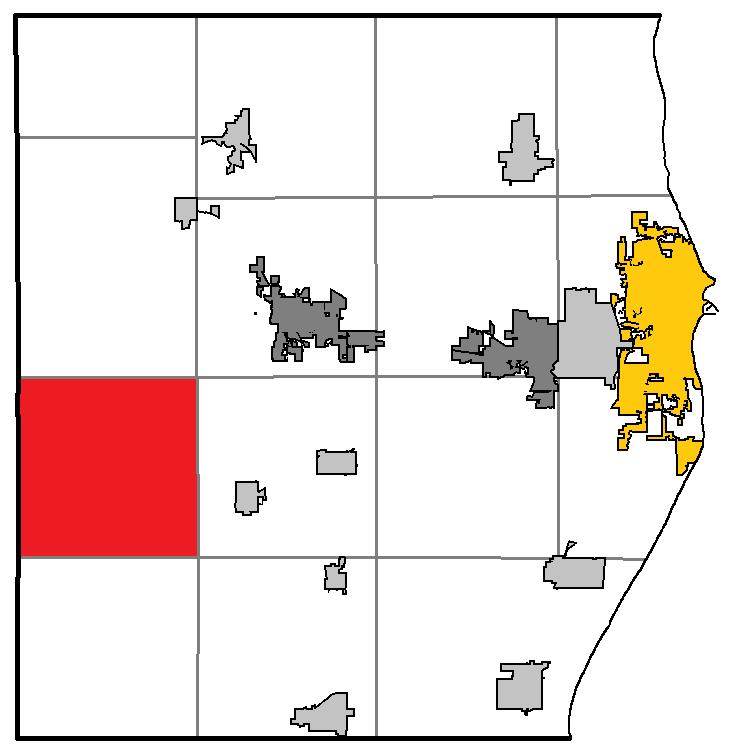
- Location of Mitchell, within Sheboygan County
- Coordinates: 43°40′14″N 88°6′18″W
- Country: United States
- State: Wisconsin
- County: Sheboygan

Area
  - Total: 36.2 sq mi (93.7 km^{2})
  - Land: 36.1 sq mi (93.6 km^{2})
  - Water: 0.039 sq mi (0.1 km^{2})
- Elevation: 1,089 ft (332 m)

Population (2020)
  - Total: 1,900
  - Density: 53/sq mi (20/km^{2})
- Time zone: UTC-6 (Central (CST))
  - Summer (DST): UTC-5 (CDT)
- Area code: 920
- FIPS code: 55-53375
- GNIS feature ID: 1583732
- Website: www.townofmitchell.com

Mitchell is a town in Sheboygan County, Wisconsin, United States. The population was 1,900 at the 2020 census. It is included in the Sheboygan, Wisconsin Metropolitan Statistical Area. The unincorporated community of Parnell is located in the town.

== Geography ==
According to the United States Census Bureau, the town has a total area of 36.2 square miles (93.7 km^{2}), of which 36.1 square miles (93.6 km^{2}) is land and 0.04 square miles (0.1 km^{2}) (0.08%) is water.

== Demographics ==
As of the census of 2000, there were 1,132 people, 419 households, and 333 families residing in the town. The population density was 31.3 people per square mile (12.1/km^{2}). There were 437 housing units at an average density of 12.1 per square mile (4.7/km^{2}). The racial makeup of the town was 99.12% White, 0.44% Native American, 0.18% Asian, and 0.27% from two or more races. Hispanic or Latino of any race were 0.71% of the population.

There were 419 households, out of which 32.7% had children under the age of 18 living with them, 71.4% were married couples living together, 4.1% had a female householder with no husband present, and 20.3% were non-families. 16.2% of all households were made up of individuals, and 5.0% had someone living alone who was 65 years of age or older. The average household size was 2.70 and the average family size was 3.04.

In the town, the population was spread out, with 25.0% under the age of 18, 6.4% from 18 to 24, 27.7% from 25 to 44, 29.4% from 45 to 64, and 11.4% who were 65 years of age or older. The median age was 40 years. For every 100 females, there were 106.6 males. For every 100 females age 18 and over, there were 108.6 males.

The median income for a household in the town was $56,875, and the median income for a family was $65,000. Males had a median income of $39,934 versus $27,500 for females. The per capita income for the town was $23,896. About 1.2% of families and 2.8% of the population were below the poverty line, including 4.3% of those under age 18 and 4.5% of those age 65 or over.

== Notable people ==
- W. J. Gilboy, teacher and socialist member of the State Assembly was raised on a farm in Mitchell
- Simon Gillen, farmer, judge, Wisconsin State Representative was born in Mitchell
