= Walter Melchior =

American politician

Walter Melchior (August 18, 1894 – October 22, 1976) was a member of the Wisconsin State Assembly.

== Biography ==
Melchior was born on August 18, 1894, in Green Bay, Wisconsin and grew up in Algoma, Wisconsin. During World War I, he served with the Rainbow Division of the United States Army. He was awarded the Silver Star and the Croix de guerre of France. He graduated from the University of Wisconsin Law School and was admitted to the bar in 1925. During World War II, he served as an officer with the Wisconsin Army National Guard. He died on October 22, 1976.

== Political career ==
Melchior was elected to the Assembly in 1950. In addition, he was city attorney of New London, Wisconsin, as well as a delegate to the Republican National Convention in 1932 and 1948. He was a member of the Wisconsin Progressive Party.
