= Simon Gillen =

American lawyer and politician

The Honorable Simon Gillen
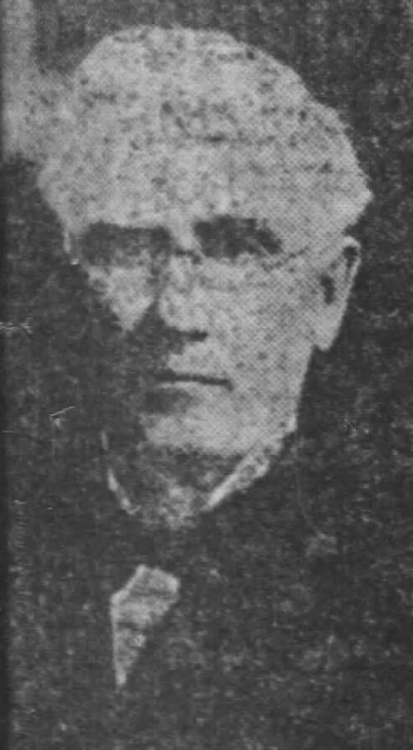

Member of the Wisconsin State Assembly from the Sheboygan 2nd district
- In office January 1, 1882 – January 1, 1883
- Preceded by: Maurice D. L. Fuller
- Succeeded by: Alfred L. Swart

Personal details
- Born: May 1, 1855 Mitchell, Wisconsin
- Died: July 6, 1918 (aged 63) Sheboygan, Wisconsin
- Cause of death: Stroke
- Resting place: Calvary Cemetery; Sheboygan, Wisconsin
- Party: Democratic
- Spouses: Mary Amelia Stude; (m. 1896; died 1919)
- Parents: James Gillen (father); Nancy (Larken) Gillen (mother)
- Occupation: farmer, lawyer, politician

Simon Gillen (May 1, 1855 – July 6, 1918) was an American politician, farmer, attorney and jurist. He served one term in the Wisconsin State Assembly and held a number of local offices in Sheboygan County, Wisconsin.

== Biography ==
Born in the Town of Mitchell, Sheboygan County, Wisconsin, Gillen was a farmer. He served as chairman of the Mitchell Town Board and on the Sheboygan County Board of Supervisors in 1880 and 1881. In 1882, Gillen served in the Wisconsin State Assembly and was a Democrat. Then, in 1882, Gillen was elected Clerk of Circuit Court for Sheboygan County. In 1888, Gillen was admitted to the Wisconsin bar and was elected district attorney for Sheboygan County. In 1894, Gillen was elected county judge and served until 1898. Gillen also served on the Sheboygan Common Council in 1891 and from 1907 to 1909. Gillen died in Sheboygan, Wisconsin as a result of a stroke while working in his garden at his home.
