= Carl Zabel =

American politician

Carl Albert Maximilian Zabel (March 19, 1837 - ?) was an American merchant and manufacturer from Milwaukee, Wisconsin, who spent one term as an independent member of the Wisconsin State Assembly.

== Background ==
Zabel was born March 19, 1837, in Magdeburg, Saxony, in the Kingdom of Prussia. He immigrated to New York City in 1851, and moved to Milwaukee in 1856. He described himself as "having received a collegiate education", became a merchant and manufacturer, and retired from active business before ever holding public office.

== Public office ==
Zabel became commissioner of Milwaukee Public Schools in May 1881; and was elected to the Assembly for 1882 for the 6th Milwaukee County Assembly district (the 6th and 13th Wards of the City of Milwaukee) with 790 votes, unseating incumbent Republican Henry Herzer, who polled 675 votes. He was assigned to the standing committee on the assessment and collection of taxes.

In February 1882, he introduced a bill in the Assembly which called for any land grants to defunct railroads to revert to the state, rather than being transferred to the successors to those railroads. Zabel told a Milwaukee Sentinel reporter that he was not at all sanguine about the bill's passage, "in view of the fact that all, or nearly all, of the members of the Legislature have their complimentary railroad passes in their pockets" and thus felt obligated to the railroad corporations.

He was not a candidate for re-election for 1883, and was succeeded by Democrat Frederick Scheiber.
