= Parnell, Wisconsin =

- Unincorporated community
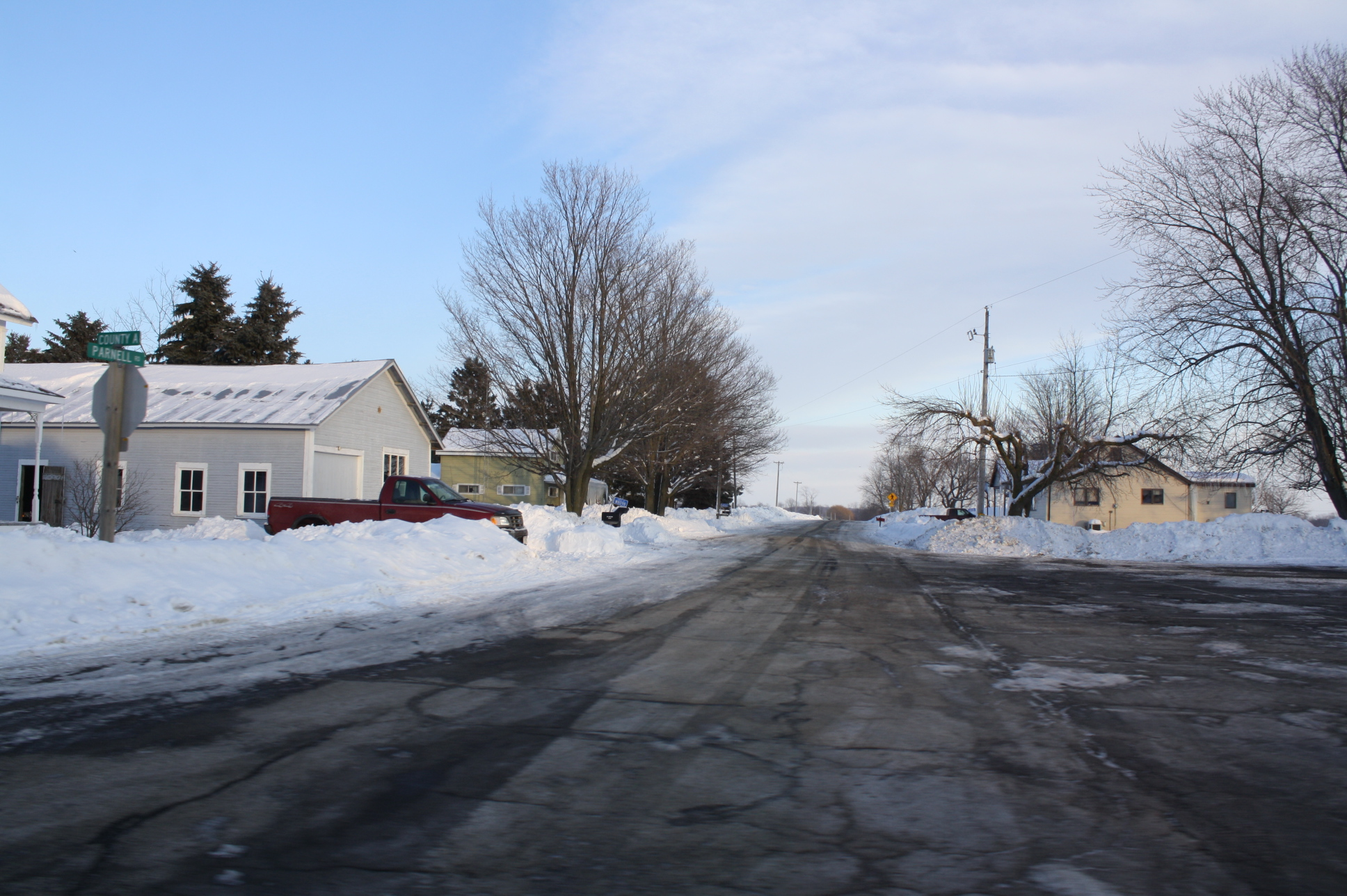
- Looking east in Parnell
- Etymology: In honor of Irish nationalist Charles Stewart Parnell
- Location within Wisconsin Location within the United States
- Coordinates: 43°40′00″N 88°06′00″W
- Country: United States
- State: Wisconsin
- County: Sheboygan
- Elevation: 1,086 ft (331 m)
- Time zone: UTC-6 (Central (CST))
  - Summer (DST): UTC-5 (CDT)
- Area code: 920
- GNIS feature ID: 1571063

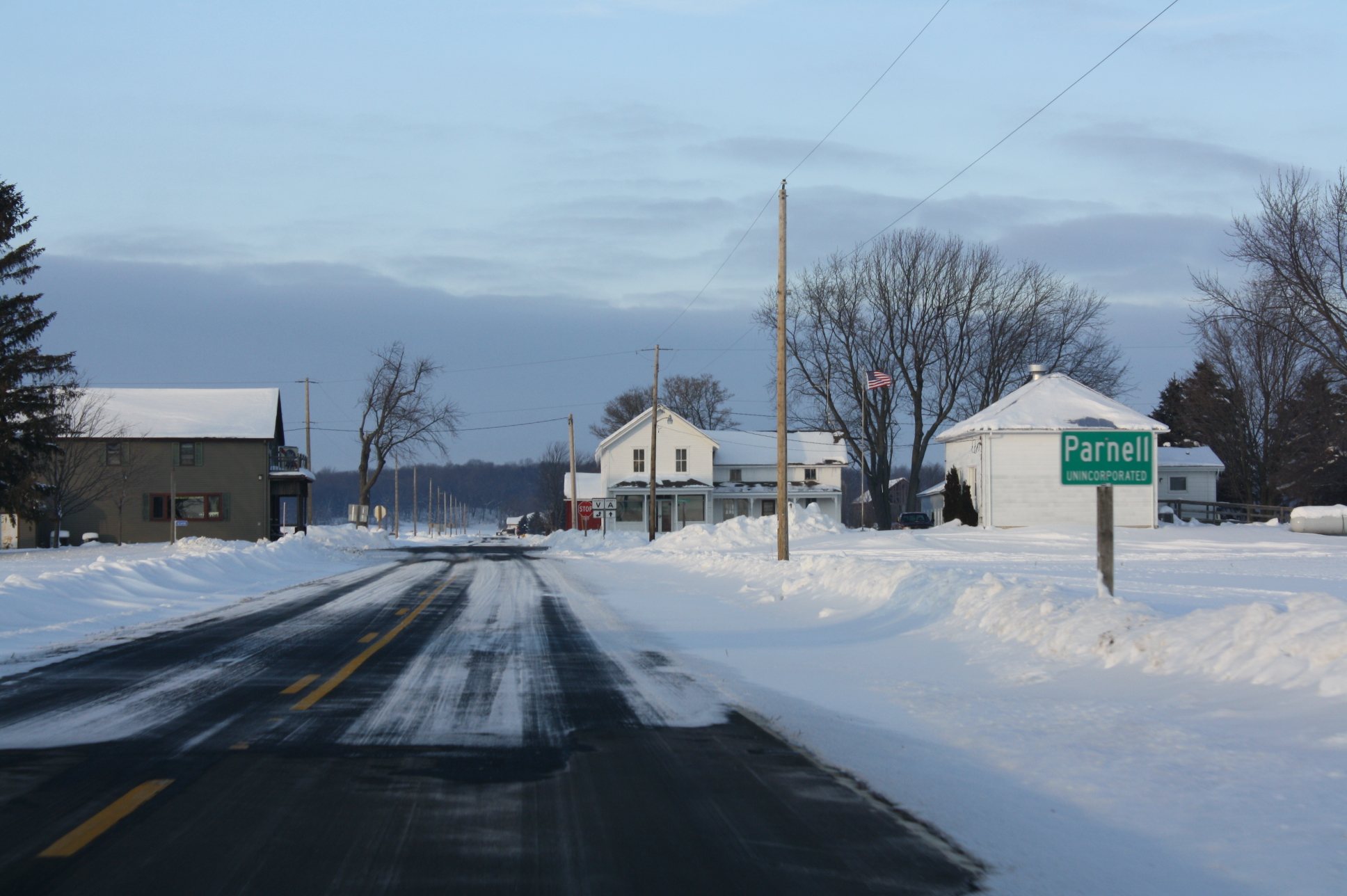
Looking north at the sign for Parnell

Parnell is an unincorporated community located in the town of Mitchell, Sheboygan County, Wisconsin, United States. Parnell is located at the junction of County Highways A and V, 4.7 miles (7.6 km) west of Cascade.
