= Frank Lewis Nason =

American mining engineer, teacher, and writer

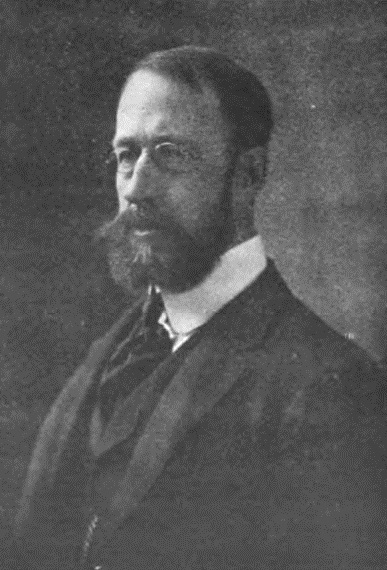
- Born: May 12, 1856; New London, Wisconsin, US
- Died: September 12, 1928 (aged 72); Glens Falls, New York, US
- Education: A.B., A.M.
- Alma mater: Amherst College
- Occupations: Mining engineer, teacher, and writer
- Spouse(s): Tholia Abigail Painter (1885), Madeline Elinor Reynolds (1909)
- Children: 2

Frank Lewis Nason (May 12, 1856 – September 12, 1928) was an American mining engineer, teacher, and writer.

== Biography ==
He was born to Lewis Clark Nason and Maria Julia (Stickles) in New London, Wisconsin and attended Middlebury High School in Middlebury, Vermont. In 1877 he entered Amherst College in Massachusetts, graduating in June, 1882 with an A.B. degree. After two months at Yale Divinity School, he became an instructor, teaching mathematics at Rensselaer Polytechnic Institute in Troy, New York and geology at the nearby Troy Female Seminary. He spent part of 1885–6 at Johns Hopkins University, then received an A.M. from Amherst College in 1885, and on July 29 was married to Tholia Abigail Painter. The couple had two children: Stanley Lewis and Alexia Painter.

From 1888 to 1891 he was the assistant state geologist of New Jersey state, then for Missouri until 1893. He became a manager at the Columbia Hydraulic Mining Company in British Columbia, Canada in 1895, then at the Mt. Wilson Gold and Silver Mining Company in Colorado starting in 1897. From 1901 to 1903 he was a mining geologist at Derby Lead Mining Company and the Federal Lead Mining Company in Missouri. He then became a consulting mining engineer for the New Jersey Zinc Mining Company, and in 1907 for the Virginia-Carolina Chemical Company and for Witherbee, Sherman & Co. He remarried on December 11, 1909, to Madeline Elinor Reynolds. In 1910 he performed special work for the Standard Oil Company.

He died as the consequence of an automobile accident in Glens Falls, New York. Nason was a fellow of the American Association for the Advancement of Science and the Geological Society of America. The mineral nasonite is named after him.

== Bibliography ==
- Iron mines: notes on the active iron mines (1891)
- The post-archean age of the white limestones of Sussex County, N.J (1891)
- To the end of the trail (1902)
- The blue goose (1903)
- The vision of Elijah Berl (1905)
