= Fred N. Comdohr =

Nineteenth century Republican politician from Wisconsin

Fred N. Comdohr was a member of the Wisconsin State Assembly in 1883. Additionally, he was an alderman of Milwaukee, Wisconsin from 1878 to 1881. He was a Republican. Comdohr was born on April 22, 1839, in what is now Schleswig-Holstein, Germany.
