= John A. Wall =

American politician

John A. Wall (November 30, 1847 – June 24, 1886) was an American lawyer and politician.

Born in Milwaukee County, Wisconsin Territory, Wall studied law with Edward George Ryan, Chief Justice of the Wisconsin Supreme Court and was admitted to the Wisconsin bar. He practiced law. He served in the Wisconsin State Assembly, in 1883, as a Democrat.
