= William Lindsay (Wisconsin politician) =

American politician

William Lindsay (July 15, 1840 – December 6, 1927) was a member of the Wisconsin State Assembly.

== Biography ==
Lindsay was born on July 15, 1840, in Dundee, Scotland. He would later move to Trenton, Dodge County, Wisconsin. After living for a time in Olmsted County, Minnesota, he moved to Milwaukee, Wisconsin, in 1874.

== Career ==
Lindsay was elected to the Assembly in 1882. Previously, he was Chairman of the Olmsted County Board in 1866. He was a Republican.
