= George Warren (Wisconsin politician) =

American politician

George Warren was an American politician. He was a member of the Wisconsin State Assembly in 1883, representing the 2nd District of Waupaca County, Wisconsin. He was a Democrat. Warren was born on June 28, 1828, in Lexington, New York.
