= Frederick C. G. Brand =

American politician

Member of the Wisconsin State Assembly

Treasurer of Milwaukee

Personal details
- Born: Gottfried Brand; June 17, 1829 Meschede, Province of Westphalia, Kingdom of Prussia
- Died: February 11, 1901 (aged 71)
- Party: Democratic
- Occupation: Church organist

Frederick C. G. Brand (born Gottfried Brand; June 17, 1829 – February 11, 1901) was a Prussian-born American politician. He was a member of the Wisconsin State Assembly.

== Biography ==
Brand was born in Meschede, Westphalia, then in Prussia. He went on to become a church organist.

== Political career ==
Brand was a member of the Assembly in 1883. Additionally, he was the city treasurer of Milwaukee, Wisconsin, in 1872 and 1874. He was a Democrat.
