= John Schmidt (state representative) =

American politician

John Schmidt April 28, 1833, Wirschweiler – September 4, 1905, Muskego, Wisconsin) was an American politician. He was a member of the Wisconsin State Assembly during the 1864, 1880 and 1893 sessions. He served as a Republican affiliated with the National Union Party and as a Democrat.
