= Josephus Wakefield =

American politician

Josephus Wakefield was a member of the Wisconsin State Assembly.

== Biography ==
Wakefield was born on October 10, 1819. He died on April 14, 1901.

== Career ==
Wakefield was a member of the Assembly in 1882. Other positions he held include Postmaster of Medina, Outagamie County, Wisconsin, member of the Board of Supervisors of Outagamie County, Wisconsin and District Attorney of Waupaca County, Wisconsin. He was a Republican.
