= William Alonzo Barber =

American politician

William Alonzo Barber (January 11, 1843 – February 16, 1913) was a member of the Wisconsin State Assembly.

== Biography ==
Barber was born on January 11, 1843, in Saratoga County, New York and moved to Wisconsin in 1856. During the American Civil War, he served with the 37th Wisconsin Volunteer Infantry Regiment of the Union Army. Other jobs he held include merchant, banker, partner of a lumber firm, teacher, and Director of Wayland Academy.

On April 9, 1867, Barber married Mary Lawton. They had two children. Barber was a Baptist.

Barber died in 1913 at his home in Warrens, Wisconsin.

== Political career ==
Barber was a member of the Assembly in 1882. Other positions he held included postmaster of Warrens, Wisconsin. He was a Republican.
