= Herman Schatz =

American politician

Herman Schatz, Sr. (December 26, 1843 – June 28, 1906) was an American politician and blacksmith.

Born in Greifenberg, Kingdom of Bavaria, Schatz emigrated with his parents to the United States in 1851. Schatz lived in Watertown, Wisconsin, then in Cedarburg, Wisconsin, and then finally settled in Brookfield, Wisconsin. Schatz operated a hotel and blacksmith shop. During the American Civil War, Schatz served as a blacksmith in the Union Army. In 1882, Schatz served in the Wisconsin State Assembly and was a Democrat. Schatz died at his home in Brookfield, Wisconsin.
