= Robert W. Pierce =

American politician

Robert W. Pierce was a member of the Wisconsin State Assembly.

== Biography ==
Pierce was born on February 14, 1821, in Buckland, Massachusetts. He died in 1914.

== Career ==
Pierce was a member of the Assembly during the 1883 and 1885 sessions. He was a Republican.
