= Arnold Huchting =

American politician

Arnold Huchting (October 15, 1828 – April 16, 1901) was a member of the Wisconsin State Assembly.

== Biography ==
Huchting was born in 1828 in Bremen, Germany. He spent time in Australia and India (in 1847) before immigrating to the United States in 1852. He initially lived in the southern United States, and he married Louise Wetter in Savannah, Georgia, in 1860. He then moved to Madison, Wisconsin, and Milwaukee, Wisconsin. He became an officer of the Madison Fire Department in 1861 and was a member of the Madison Turn-Verein in the 1860s. Huchting committed suicide in 1901 while suffering from sciatic rheumatism.

== Career ==
Huchting was a member of the Assembly in 1882. He was a merchant by trade.
