= Alfred L. Swart =

American politician

Alfred L. Swart was a member of the Wisconsin State Assembly in 1883, representing the 2nd District of Sheboygan County, Wisconsin. He was a Democrat. Swart was born on June 11, 1840, in Florida, Montgomery County, New York.
