= New London, Wisconsin =

- City
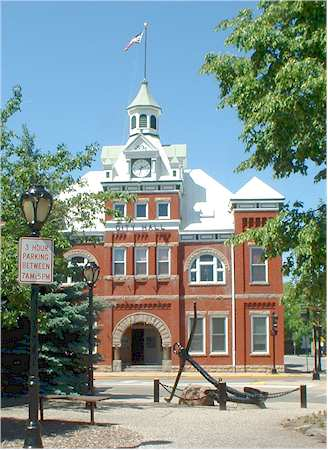
- Old City Hall of New London

- Location of New London in Waupaca and Outagamie Counties, Wisconsin.

- Location within Wisconsin Location within the United States
- Coordinates: 44°23′14″N 88°44′25″W
- Country: United States
- State: Wisconsin
- Counties: Waupaca, Outagamie

Area
  - Total: 5.80 sq mi (15.02 km^{2})
  - Land: 5.57 sq mi (14.43 km^{2})
  - Water: 0.22 sq mi (0.58 km^{2})
- Elevation: 768 ft (234 m)

Population (2020)
  - Total: 7,348
  - Estimate (2022): 7,425
  - Density: 1,273/sq mi (491.4/km^{2})
- Time zone: UTC-6 (Central (CST))
  - Summer (DST): UTC-5 (CDT)
- Area code: 920
- FIPS code: 55-56925
- GNIS feature ID: 1570226
- Website: https://www.newlondonwi.org/

New London is a city in Outagamie and Waupaca counties in the U.S. state of Wisconsin. Founded in 1851, the population was 7,348 at the 2020 census.

The city has an annual Saint Patrick's Day Parade, Irish Fest, and week-long festivities, when the city's name is changed to "New Dublin" for the week. In 2022, Killaloe, County Clare, Ireland became New London's sister city (known in Ireland as Twinning).

== History ==
For thousands of years, this area was occupied by successive indigenous cultures. Some were known as moundbuilders, constructing a reported 72 earthworks near what is now Taylor Lake in the county, including many effigy mounds. Their descendants included the Menominee, who lived here for thousands of years. In the Menominee language this place is known as Sakēmāēwataenoh, meaning "mosquito place", likely due to its riverside location. The Menominee sold this land to the United States in the 1836 Treaty of the Cedars, which saw over four million acres of land in Wisconsin sold after years of negotiation about how to accommodate the Oneida, Stockbridge-Munsee, and Brothertown peoples who were being removed from New York to Wisconsin.

Following the treaty which made the land available for purchase, New London was established by European-American settlers in 1852 and was named after New London, Connecticut by Reeder Smith, a founder whose father was from there. Reeder Smith built the plank road between Appleton and Stevens Point. New London became a lumber center and the terminus of steamboats plying the Wolf River from Oshkosh.

The American Water Spaniel was developed as a registered breed by F. J. Pfeifer of New London. It was named the state dog in 1986.

== Geography ==
New London is located at 44°23′14″N 88°44′25″W (44.387142, -88.740140). According to the United States Census Bureau, the city has a total area of 5.78 square miles (14.97 km^{2}), of which 5.55 square miles (14.37 km^{2}) is land and 0.23 square miles (0.60 km^{2}) is water. New London sits on both the Wolf and Embarrass Rivers, making it a destination for boaters and fishermen.

=== Climate ===
Climate data for New London, Wisconsin (1991–2020)
Month	Jan	Feb	Mar	Apr	May	Jun	Jul	Aug	Sep	Oct	Nov	Dec	Year
Mean daily maximum °F (°C)	24.8 (−4.0)	28.6 (−1.9)	40.7 (4.8)	54.2 (12.3)	67.6 (19.8)	77.0 (25.0)	81.1 (27.3)	79.2 (26.2)	71.7 (22.1)	58.1 (14.5)	43.2 (6.2)	30.3 (−0.9)	54.7 (12.6)
Daily mean °F (°C)	16.5 (−8.6)	19.7 (−6.8)	31.1 (−0.5)	43.8 (6.6)	56.4 (13.6)	66.0 (18.9)	70.1 (21.2)	68.5 (20.3)	60.4 (15.8)	47.8 (8.8)	34.8 (1.6)	22.7 (−5.2)	44.8 (7.1)
Mean daily minimum °F (°C)	8.3 (−13.2)	10.8 (−11.8)	21.6 (−5.8)	33.3 (0.7)	45.3 (7.4)	55.0 (12.8)	59.0 (15.0)	57.7 (14.3)	49.0 (9.4)	37.5 (3.1)	26.4 (−3.1)	15.1 (−9.4)	34.9 (1.6)
Average precipitation inches (mm)	1.28 (33)	1.18 (30)	2.08 (53)	3.46 (88)	4.21 (107)	4.79 (122)	4.06 (103)	3.73 (95)	3.43 (87)	2.92 (74)	1.90 (48)	1.81 (46)	34.85 (886)
Average snowfall inches (cm)	10.8 (27)	11.0 (28)	6.8 (17)	3.7 (9.4)	0.0 (0.0)	0.0 (0.0)	0.0 (0.0)	0.0 (0.0)	0.0 (0.0)	0.2 (0.51)	2.4 (6.1)	11.0 (28)	45.9 (116.01)
Source: NOAA

== Demographics ==
Historical population
Census	Pop.	Note	%±
1860	468		—
1870	1,015		116.9%
1880	1,808		78.1%
1890	2,050		13.4%
1900	2,742		33.8%
1910	3,383		23.4%
1920	4,667		38.0%
1930	4,661		−0.1%
1940	4,825		3.5%
1950	4,922		2.0%
1960	5,288		7.4%
1970	5,801		9.7%
1980	6,210		7.1%
1990	6,658		7.2%
2000	7,085		6.4%
2010	7,295		3.0%
2020	7,348		0.7%
U.S. Decennial Census

=== 2010 census ===
As of the census of 2010, there were 7,295 people, 3,038 households, and 1,903 families residing in the city. The population density was 1,314.4 inhabitants per square mile (507.5/km^{2}). There were 3,310 housing units at an average density of 596.4 per square mile (230.3/km^{2}). The racial makeup of the city was 93.2% White, 0.2% African American, 0.7% Native American, 0.9% Asian, 3.8% from other races, and 1.3% from two or more races. Hispanic or Latino of any race were 6.9% of the population.

There were 3,038 households, of which 32.7% had children under the age of 18 living with them, 45.0% were married couples living together, 11.8% had a female householder with no husband present, 5.8% had a male householder with no wife present, and 37.4% were non-families. 32.3% of all households were made up of individuals, and 14.1% had someone living alone who was 65 years of age or older. The average household size was 2.35 and the average family size was 2.95.

The median age in the city was 37.4 years. 25.7% of residents were under the age of 18; 7.8% were between the ages of 18 and 24; 26.4% were from 25 to 44; 24.5% were from 45 to 64; and 15.7% were 65 years of age or older. The gender makeup of the city was 49.4% male and 50.6% female.

=== 2000 census ===
As of the census of 2000, there were 7,085 people, 2,894 households, and 1,843 families residing in the city. The population density was 1,265.5 people per square mile (488.5/km^{2}). There were 3,045 housing units at an average density of 543.9 per square mile (209.9/km^{2}). The racial makeup of the city was 96.64% White, 0.20% African American, 0.45% Native American, 0.51% Asian, 0.01% Pacific Islander, 1.28% from other races, and 0.90% from two or more races. Hispanic or Latino of any race were 2.46% of the population.

There were 2,894 households, out of which 33.1% had children under the age of 18 living with them, 48.9% were married couples living together, 10.4% had a female householder with no husband present, and 36.3% were non-families. 30.3% of all households were made up of individuals, and 13.5% had someone living alone who was 65 years of age or older. The average household size was 2.38 and the average family size was 2.98.

In the city, the population was spread out, with 25.5% under the age of 18, 9.7% from 18 to 24, 30.2% from 25 to 44, 18.8% from 45 to 64, and 15.8% who were 65 years of age or older. The median age was 35 years. For every 100 females, there were 96.5 males. For every 100 females age 18 and over, there were 91.2 males.

The median income for a household in the city was $37,491, and the median income for a family was $49,028. Males had a median income of $34,481 versus $21,728 for females. The per capita income for the city was $18,153. About 3.8% of families and 5.9% of the population were below the poverty line, including 5.2% of those under age 18 and 6.5% of those age 65 or over.

== Transportation ==
US 45 Northbound to Clintonville; Southbound, to Oshkosh.
WIS 54 travels east to Green Bay, and west to Waupaca.
WIS 15 travels east (from immediately southeast of the city) to Appleton.

== Culture ==
=== Museums ===
The New London Public Museum, which was founded in 1917, contains exhibits on local and natural history and Native American and world cultures. Five historic buildings can be toured at the Heritage Historical Village, which includes a railroad museum.

=== Performing arts ===
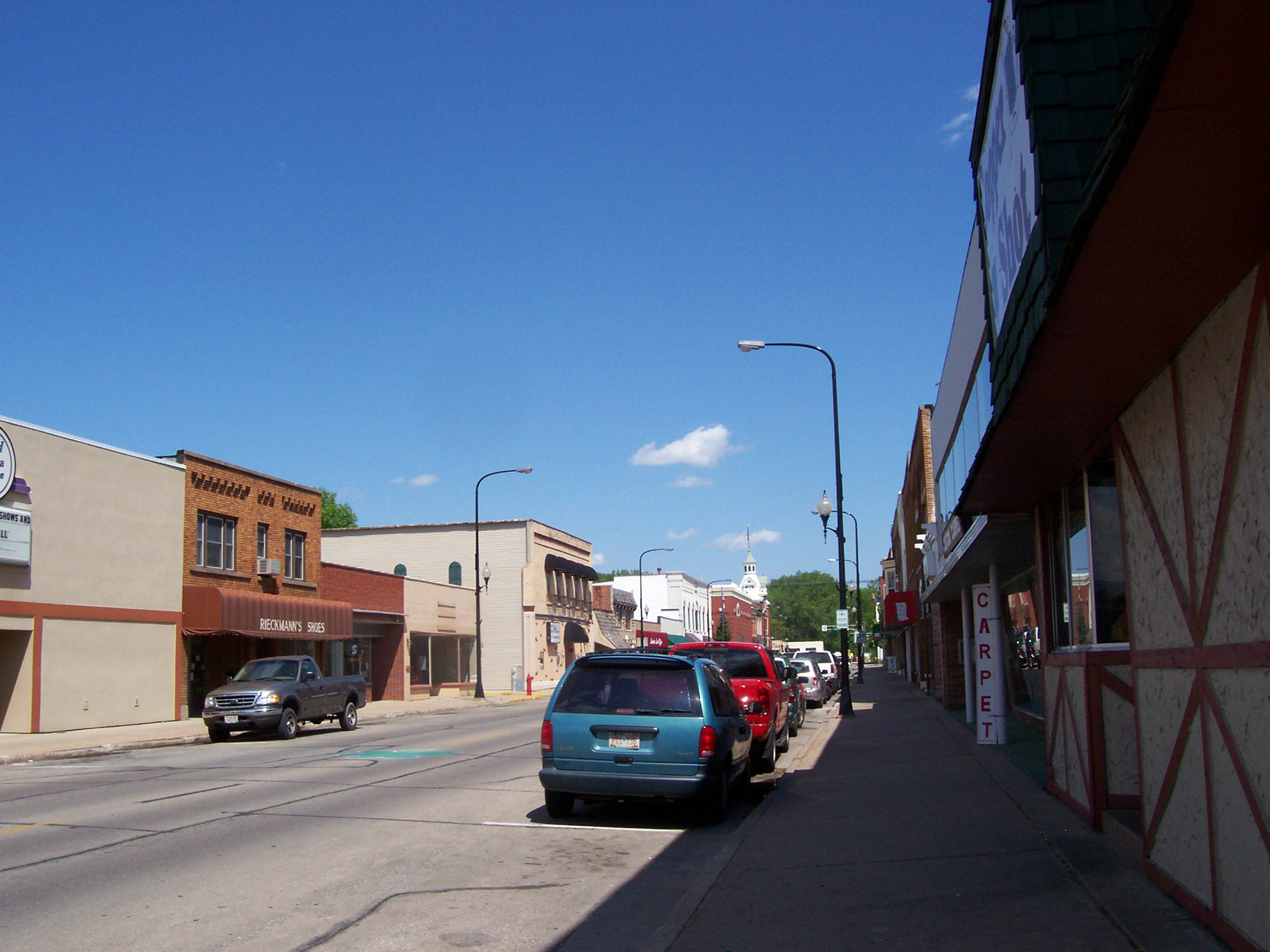
Downtown New London

The Wolf River Theatrical Troupe produces plays and productions throughout various sites in New London including Crystal Falls and the New London High School. A professional western stunt show called "Whips, Garters, and Guns Wild West Review" performed by movie stunt performers has its home in New London. Its performances are also held in other cities at fairs, festivals, rodeos, and business places each summer.

=== Festivals and parades ===
"Leprechauns" kick off week-long festivities by renaming New London to New Dublin

Each March, Wisconsin's largest St. Patrick's Day parade is held with an Irish Fest and sponsored by the Shamrock Club of New Dublin, as the town is renamed "New Dublin" for the week. Weeknight Irish festivities are also scheduled that include Irish entertainment, an Irish Cèilidh, Finnegan's wake, and Irish caroling. Corned beef and cabbage is served in local restaurants that week too.

Early in August the New London Heritage Historical Society holds its annual "Heritage Days and Rail Fest" event with a buckskinners rendezvous encampment at New London's Heritage Historical Village. A September "Cheese and Sausage Fall Family Fest" is held downtown, and late in the year is the "Holiday of Wonder" festivity with a parade, children's crafts, a live nativity scene, and a "Santa Land".

== Recreation ==
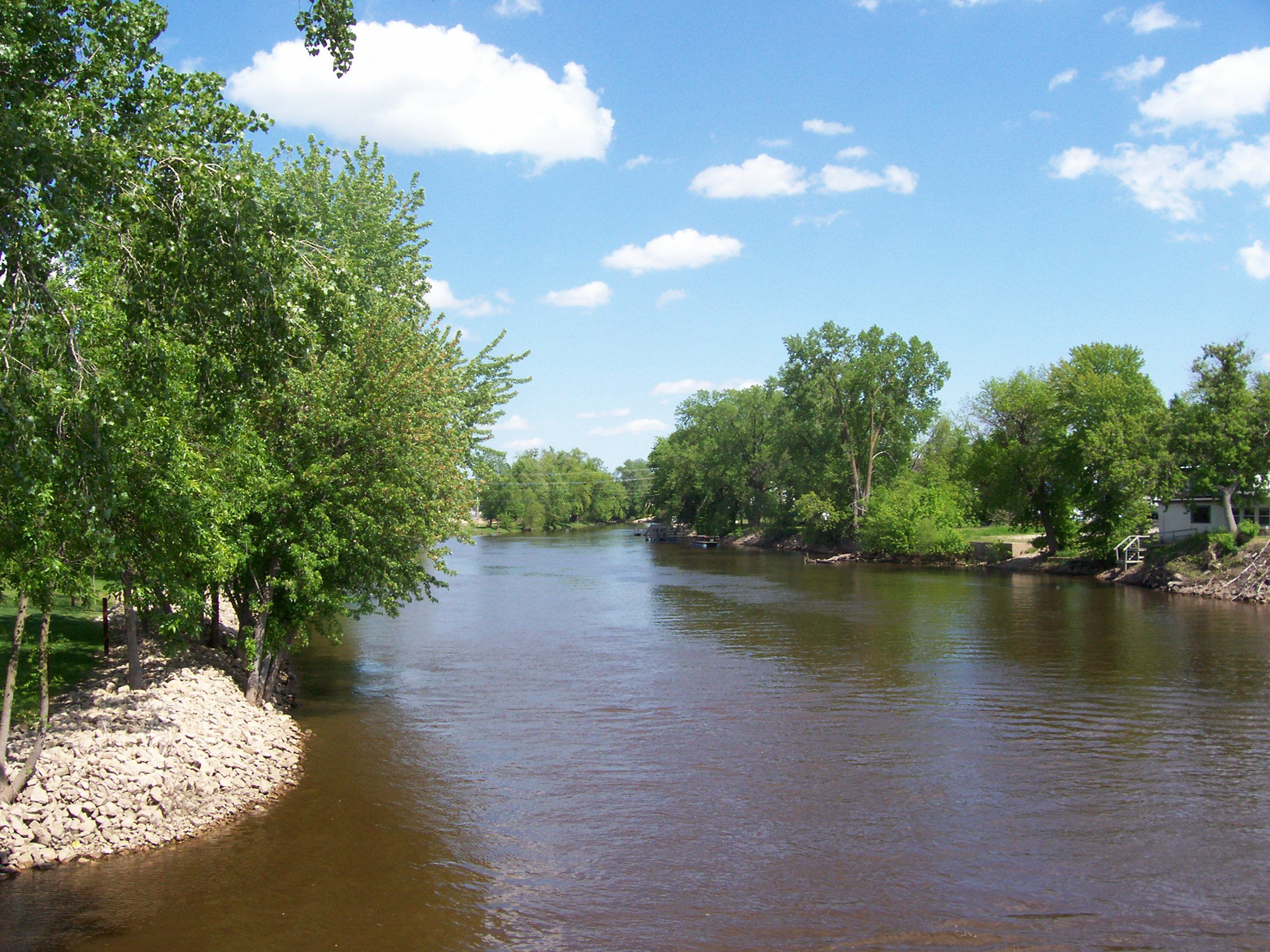
The Wolf River in downtown New London

Situated on both the Embarrass River and Wolf River, New London is a year-round fisherman's paradise with some of the earliest walleye fishing in the state. New London is also a popular destination for river tubing, canoeing, and camping. Tube and canoe rentals with a shuttle service are available on the scenic Little Wolf River four miles west of town. The par-70 Shamrock Heights Golf and Supper Club has 18 holes of both traditional and links style. Grand Cinema Theatres, located downtown on North Water Street, is another great stop in New London. The "Grand" auditorium, built in 1895 and completed in 1896, has offered services such as an opera house, community center, and, currently, a modern-day movie theatre.

=== Newton-Blackmour State Trail ===
The Newton Blackmour State Trail extends 24 miles from Seymour, WI to New London, WI. The trail is used for snowmobiles, snowshoeing, and cross country skiing in winter and hiking, biking and horse back riding in summer. The name "Newton-Blackmour" is made up from the four incorporated communities on the trail.

=== Sturgeon Trail ===
The Sturgeon Trail, located in the Mukwa State Wildlife Area west of New London, Wisconsin, is a half mile paved trail along the Wolf River. During a short period of time, usually between late March and early May, sturgeon begin to swim upriver. Many swim close to shore looking for a place to spawn. During the summer months, the sturgeon trail is another great spot for fishing.

== Education ==
The School District of New London consists of seven learning facilities as well as three other buildings. Two parochial schools are also located in New London.

Elementary Schools

Parkview Elementary: Parkview Elementary, located on Werner-Allen Road, New London, Wisconsin, is the largest elementary school in the New London School District. Parkview offers grades 4k through 4th.

Lincoln Elementary: Lincoln Elementary, located on East Washington Street, near downtown New London, teaches over 300 students annually. Lincoln offers grades 4k through 4th.

Readfield Elementary: Readfield Elementary is located outside of New London in the Town of Readfield on Hwy 96. Readfield offers grades kindergarten through 4th.

Sugarbush Elementary: Sugarbush Elementary is located north of New London on City Road WW. It is the smallest school in the New London School District. Sugar bush offers grades 4k through 4th.

Middle/Intermediate School:

New London Intermediate/Middle School is located on West Washington Street, New London. It serves over 700 students in grades 5 through 8.

High School:

New London High School is located on Klatt Road, New London. It is the largest school in the New London School District, with approximately 800 students and offers grades 9 through 12.

Alternate Learning

Catalyst Academy: Catalyst Academy is one of the New London School District's alternate learning options. It is located on South Shawno Street, New London.

Next Generation Academy: The Next Generation Academy is another of New London's alternate learning options. It is located in the high school building on Klatt Road, New London.

Parochial Schools:

Emmanuel Lutheran School: Emmanuel Lutheran School is a private Christian school of the Wisconsin Evangelical Lutheran Synod located on East Quincy Avenue, New London. It offers grades 4k through 8th.

Most Precious Blood: Most Precious Blood (MPB) is a private Catholic school located on East Washington Street, New London. Most Precious Blood offers 3p through 5th.

== Notable people ==
- Hannibal Dixon, Wisconsin politician and president of New London
- Elmer Hall, Wisconsin state senator, mayor of Green Bay, Wisconsin Secretary of State
- William H. Hatton, Wisconsin politician
- David E. Hutchison, Wisconsin politician
- F. Badger Ives, Wisconsin politician
- Theodore Knapstein, Wisconsin politician and mayor of New London
- Walter Melchior, Wisconsin politician
- Robert F. Morneau, Roman Catholic bishop
- Mary Mullarkey, Chief Justice of the Colorado Supreme Court
- Frank Lewis Nason, geologist
- Edward Nordman, Wisconsin politician
- A. H. Pape, Wisconsin politician
- Hector H. Perry, Chairman of the North Dakota Democratic Party
- Marcus Plant, educator
- Dennis Sommers, baseball player
- Jack Voight, Wisconsin State Treasurer

== Images ==
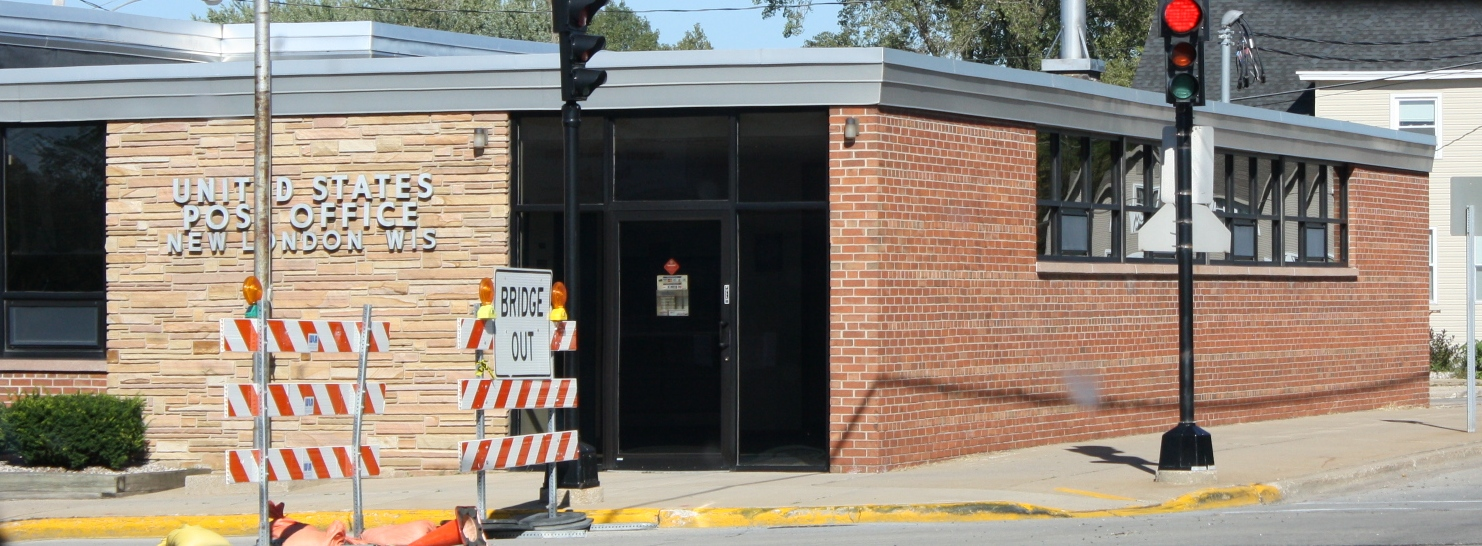
The post office in New London, in Wisconsin.

Rainbow Motel sign, in New London, in Wisconsin

Sport-O-Lectric Silo sign, in New London, in Wisconsin

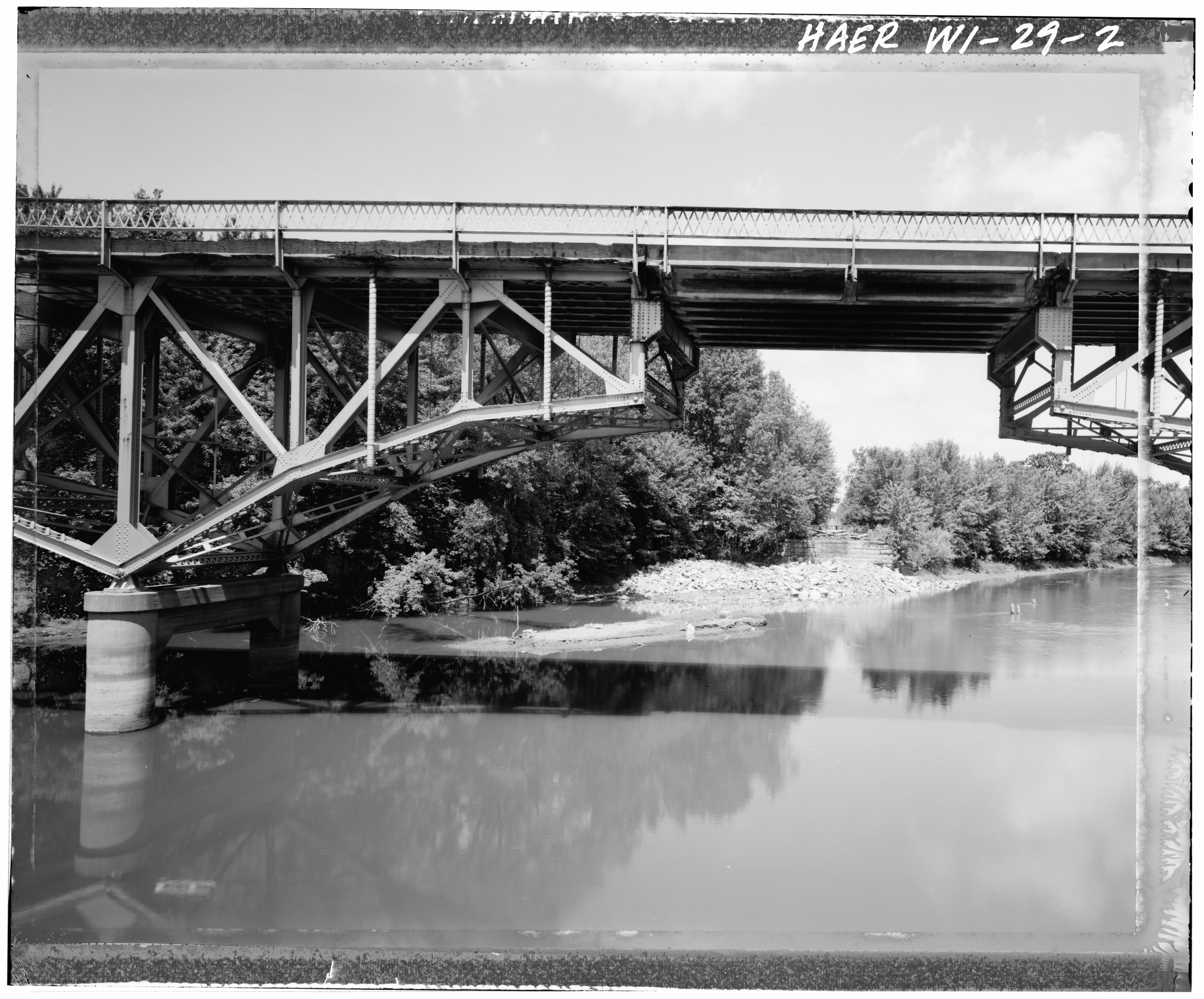

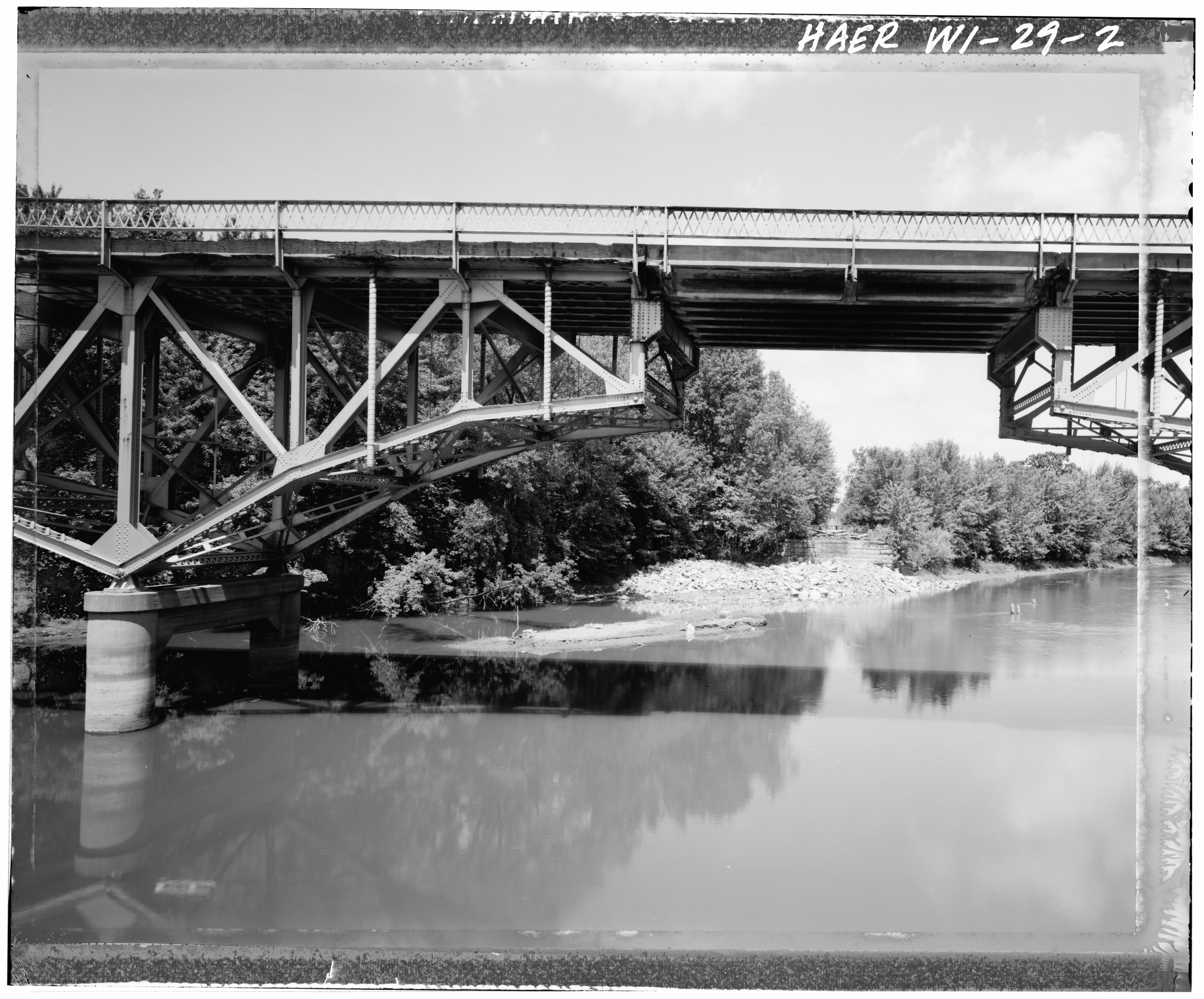

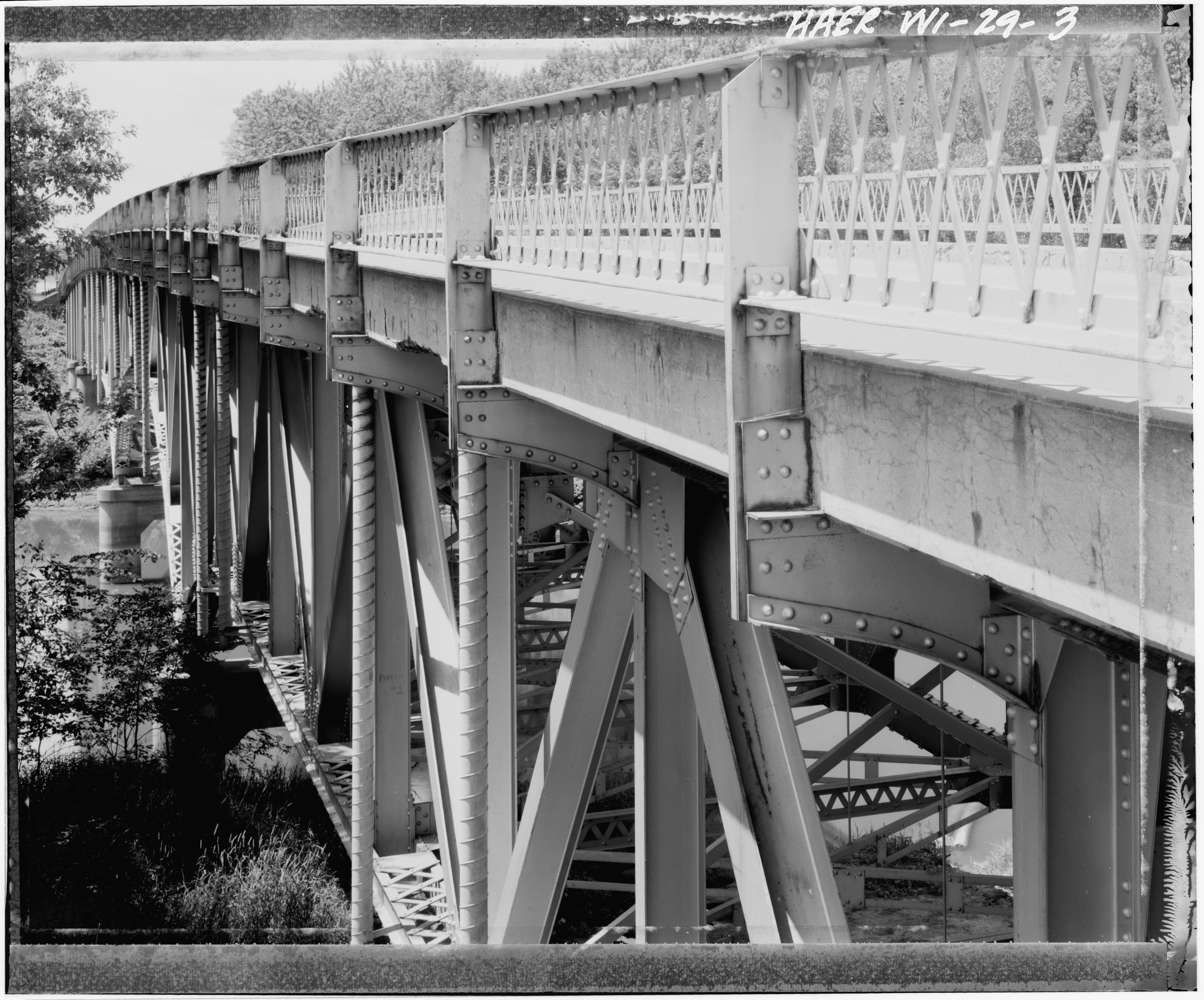
VIEW OF CENTER CANTILEVER - New London Bridge, Spanning Embarrass River on State Trunk Highway 54, New London, Waupaca County, WI HAER WIS, after C.E.1968

== See also ==
- List of cities in Wisconsin
