= Charles A. Lane =

American politician (1825–1906)

Charles A. Lane (August 10, 1825 – May 6, 1906) was an American politician who was a member of the Wisconsin State Assembly in 1882 and 1883. Additionally, he was postmaster and town clerk of Plover, Portage County, Wisconsin and a justice of the peace. In 1876, he was a candidate for county treasurer of Portage County, Wisconsin. Lane was Republican. He was born on August 10, 1825, in Springport, New York.
