= Frederick Scheiber =

American politician

Frederick Scheiber (September 2, 1843 – June 10, 1913) was an American politician.

Born in Rhenish Prussia, Scheiber moved with his parents to West Bend, Wisconsin in 1847. He studied at the University of Wisconsin and then taught school. Schreiber then studied law and was admitted to the Wisconsin bar in 1871. He served in the Wisconsin State Assembly in 1883 as a Democrat. He also served as a court commissioner and on the board of regents for the Wisconsin Normal Schools (now the University of Wisconsin System). He was arrested on charges on conspiracy in 1905.
