= William Langer (Wisconsin politician) =

Member of the Wisconsin State Assembly in 1882

William Langer was a member of the Wisconsin State Assembly in 1882. Other positions he held include President (similar to Mayor) of Waukesha, Wisconsin in 1872 and member of the county board of Waukesha County, Wisconsin in 1872, 1879, 1880 and 1881. He was a Republican. Langer was born on June 28, 1828, in Prussia.
