= Henry Goedjen =

American politician

Henry Goedjen was a member of the Wisconsin State Assembly.

== Biography ==
Goedjen was born on June 26, 1844. He died in 1911.

== Career ==
Goedjen was a member of the Assembly in 1882 and 1883. Other positions he held include Supervisor and Chairman of the town board (similar to city council) of Two Rivers (town), Wisconsin. He was a Democrat.
