= A. H. Pape =

German-American politician in Wisconsin

August Henry Pape (November 25, 1845 – October 8, 1925) was a German-American banker, insurance agent, and politician from New London, Wisconsin. He served two one-year terms as a member of the Wisconsin State Assembly and held various local political offices.

== Background ==
Pape was born in 1845, in the Kingdom of Hanover. He attended the universities of Göttingen and Heidelberg. He graduated from college in 1864, and became an insurance agent. He moved to the United States in 1866, settling in New London.

== Political office ==
Pape started serving as a member of the county board of supervisors of Outagamie County, Wisconsin, in 1876. He also served as treasurer of New London for 1875, '76, '77, '79 and '81. Pape was elected as a Democratic member of the Wisconsin House of Representatives 2nd Outagamie County district (the towns of Bovina, Black Creek, Cicero, Dale, Deer Creek. Ellington, Greenville, Hortonia, Liberty, Maine, Maple Creek, Osborn and Seymour, and the third ward of the village of New London) for 1882, with 715 votes, to 649 for Republican L. B. Mills, and 213 for Greenbacker N. Day (the incumbent, Republican James McMurdo, was not a candidate). He was assigned to the standing committee on engrossed bills. Pape was re-elected for 1883, with 749 votes to 676 for Republican John Dey and 340 for Greenbacker Z. D. Scott. He was not a candidate for re-election in 1883, and was succeeded by fellow Democrat William Frederick Cirkel.

== Banking ==
In 1886, Pape joined G. A. Murray in running the Bank of New London (the oldest in the village, established in 1872). In August 1903, the bank was reorganized under the state's new banking laws, and Pape became president, with his son, Edwin Charles Pape, as cashier. As of 1912, Pape was still president and principal (94%) shareholder.
