= John L. Pingel =

American politician

John L. Pingel (September 14, 1834 – February 28, 1923) was an American farmer, businessman, and politician.

Born in Domsuhl, Mecklenburg-Schwerin, Germany, Pingel emigrated to the United States in 1852 and settled in New York. He then moved to the town of Greenville, Outagamie County, Wisconsin, and settled on a farm. In 1887, Pingel sold the farm and started a farm implement business. Pingel served as chairman of the Greenville Town Board and as town clerk. He also served as justice of the peace. In 1882 and 1883, Pingel served in the Wisconsin State Senate as a Democrat. Pingel died from pneumonia while living at his daughter's home in Portland, Oregon.
