= Abijah Beckwith (Wisconsin politician) =

American politician

Abijah Beckwith was a member of the Wisconsin State Assembly.

== Biography ==
Beckwith was born on November 10, 1843, in Columbia, New York. In 1867, he settled in Bear Creek, Sauk County, Wisconsin. He died on June 22, 1897, and was buried in Bear Valley, Wisconsin.

== Career ==
Beckwith was a member of the Assembly during the 1882 session. Previously, he was Chairman (similar to Mayor) of Bear Creek in 1879. He was a Republican.
