= William Stillman Stanley Jr. =

American politician

William Stillman Stanley Jr. was a member of the Wisconsin State Assembly and the Wisconsin State Senate.

== Biography ==
Stanley was born on March 28, 1838, in Smithfield, Rhode Island. During the American Civil War, he was an officer in the Union Army with the Army of the James. Stanley moved to Colorado in 1865 before settling in Milwaukee, Wisconsin, in 1867. There, he worked as a jeweler.

== Political career ==
Stanley was elected to the Assembly in 1881 and re-elected 1882. That year, he was also elected to the Senate. Previously, he had been a postmaster in Colorado. He was a Republican.
