= Henry M. Ackley =

American politician

Henry Meyers Ackley was a member of the Wisconsin State Senate.

== Biography ==
Ackley was born on January 12, 1827, in what is now known as Ellisburg, New York. He first settled in what would become Oconomowoc, Wisconsin 1857. After leaving to work with Nashotah House in Nashotah, Wisconsin, in 1860, he returned to Oconomowoc in 1865. Ackley died on December 15, 1912, in Oconomowoc, Wisconsin.

On December 29, 1856, Ackley married Permelia Reynolds. They had two children before her death in 1864. The following year, Ackley married Josephine Breck, a niece of James Lloyd Breck. They had four children.

== Political career ==
Ackley represented the 10th District in the Senate in 1882 and 1883. He was also a delegate to the 1880 Democratic National Convention.
