= 37th Wisconsin Legislature =

Wisconsin legislative term for 1885-1886

←	36th	38th	→
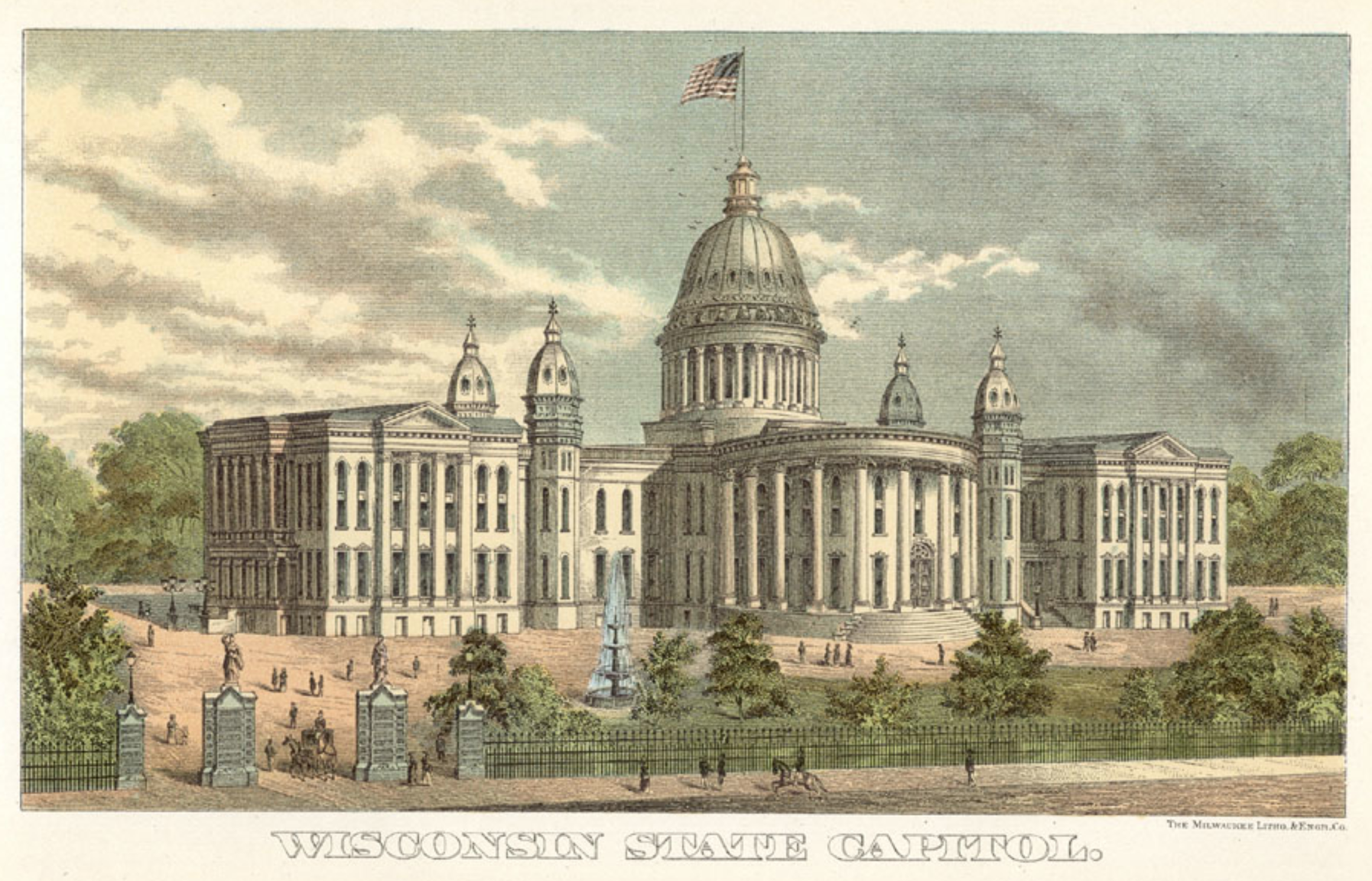
- Wisconsin State Capitol, 1887

Overview
- Legislative body: Wisconsin Legislature
- Meeting place: Wisconsin State Capitol
- Term: January 5, 1885 – January 3, 1887
- Election: November 4, 1884

Senate
- Members: 33
- Senate President: Sam S. Fifield (R)
- President pro tempore: Edward S. Minor (R)
- Party control: Republican

Assembly
- Members: 100
- Assembly Speaker: Hiram O. Fairchild (R)
- Party control: Republican

Sessions
- 1st: January 14, 1885 – April 13, 1885

The Thirty-Seventh Wisconsin Legislature convened from January 14, 1885, to April 13, 1885, in regular session.

Senators representing even-numbered districts were newly elected for this session and were serving the first two years of a four-year term. Assembly members were elected to a two-year term. Assembly members and even-numbered senators were elected in the general election of November 4, 1884. Senators representing odd-numbered districts were serving the third and fourth year of a four-year term, having been elected in the general election of November 7, 1882.

The governor of Wisconsin during this entire term was Republican Jeremiah M. Rusk, of Vernon County, serving his second two-year term, having won re-election in the 1884 Wisconsin gubernatorial election.

== Major events ==
- January 27, 1885: John Coit Spooner elected United States Senator by the Wisconsin Legislature in Joint Session.
- February 16, 1885: Charles Dow published the first edition of the Dow Jones Industrial Average.
- March 4, 1885: Inauguration of Grover Cleveland as the 22nd President of the United States.
- March 12, 1885: Wisconsin state legislator William Freeman Vilas was confirmed as United States Postmaster General.
- March 26, 1885: Prussia began deporting Poles and Jews from their territory.
- June 17, 1885: The Statue of Liberty arrived at New York Harbor.
- May 1, 1886: A general strike began in the United States.
- May 4, 1886: Wisconsin National Guard soldiers fired at a group of striking workers in Bay View, Milwaukee, killing seven, in an incident known as the Bay View massacre.
- May 17, 1886: The United States Supreme Court, in the case Santa Clara County v. Southern Pacific Railroad Co., held that corporations had the same rights as living persons.
- September 4, 1886: Apache leader Geronimo surrendered to U.S. Army forces at Skeleton Canyon, Arizona.
- September 9, 1886: The Berne Convention for the Protection of Literary and Artistic Works was signed in Bern, Switzerland.
- November 2, 1886: Jeremiah McLain Rusk re-elected as Governor of Wisconsin.

== Major legislation ==
- March 9, 1885: An Act relating to fire escapes, and amendatory of section 4575a, of the revised statutes, 1885 Act 50. Required easy-to-access metallic or fire-proof fire escape ladders for buildings taller than three floors.
- March 23, 1885: An Act to regulate the practice of dentistry, and to establish a state board of dental examiners, 1885 Act 129.
- Joint Resolution to amend section 1, article 10, of the constitution, relating to education, 1885 Joint Resolution 34. Proposed an amendment to the Constitution of Wisconsin to clarify the wording of the section defining the office of Superintendent of Public Instruction of Wisconsin and other education-supervision officers. The proposed amendment would also remove the maximum compensation limit for the Superintendent, which had been set at $1200 per year.

== Party summary ==
=== Senate summary ===
Senate partisan composition Democratic: 13 seats Republican: 20 seats

	Party (Shading indicates majority caucus)				Total	
	Dem.	Peo.	Ind.	Rep.	Total	Vacant
End of previous Legislature	15	0	0	17	32	1
1st Session	13	0	0	20	33	0
From Mar. 8, 1886	12	0	0	20	32	1
Final voting share	39.39%			60.61%		
Beginning of the next Legislature	6	1	1	25	33	0

=== Assembly summary ===
Assembly partisan composition Democratic: 39 seats Republican: 61 seats

	Party (Shading indicates majority caucus)						Total	
	Dem.	Gbk.	Trades Assm.	Peo.	Ind.	Rep.	Total	Vacant
End of previous Legislature	53	1	2	0	1	43	100	0
Start of 1st Session	39	0	0	0	0	61	100	0
From Mar. 9, 1885 (Note: Democrat William Freeman Vilas (Dane County 1st district) resigned March 9, 1885, to accept appointment as United States Postmaster General.)	38	0	0	0	0	61	99	1
From Mar. 25, 1885 (Note: Democrat Michael J. Cantwell (Dane County 1st district) replaced William Freeman Vilas.)	39	0	0	0	0	61	100	0
Final voting share	39%					61%		
Beginning of the next Legislature	34	0	0	5	4	57	100	0

== Sessions ==
- 1st Regular session: January 14, 1885 – April 13, 1885

== Leaders ==
=== Senate leadership ===
- President of the Senate: Sam S. Fifield (R)
- President pro tempore: Edward S. Minor (R)

=== Assembly leadership ===
- Speaker of the Assembly: Hiram O. Fairchild (R)

== Members ==
=== Members of the Senate ===
Members of the Senate for the Thirty-Seventh Wisconsin Legislature:

Senate partisan representation Democratic: 13 seats Republican: 20 seats

Dist.	Counties	Senator	Residence	Party
01	Door, Florence, Kewaunee, Langlade, Marinette, & Oconto	Edward S. Minor	Sturgeon Bay	Rep.
02	Brown	Thomas R. Hudd	Green Bay	Dem.
03	Racine	Charles Jonas	Racine	Dem.
04	Crawford & Vernon	Joseph W. Hoyt	Chaseburg	Rep.
05	Milwaukee (Northern Part)	Jedd P. C. Cottrill	Milwaukee	Dem.
06	Milwaukee (Southern Part)	Julius Wechselberg	Milwaukee	Rep.
07	Milwaukee (Central Part)	William S. Stanley	Milwaukee	Rep.
08	Kenosha & Walworth	Walter Maxwell	Somers	Rep.
09	Green Lake, Portage, & Waushara	James F. Wiley	Hancock	Rep.
10	Waukesha	John Lins	Eagle	Rep.
11	Ashland, Clark, Lincoln, Price, Taylor, & Wood	Merritt C. Ring	Neillsville	Rep.
12	Green & Lafayette	James Waddington	Argyle	Rep.
13	Dodge	Benjamin F. Sherman	Beaver Dam	Dem.
14	Juneau & Sauk	David B. Hulburt	Loganville	Rep.
15	Manitowoc	John Carey	Meeme	Dem.
16	Grant	Edward I. Kidd	Millville	Rep.
17	Rock	Simon Lord	Edgerton	Rep.
18	Fond du Lac (Western Part)	James F. Ware	Fond du Lac	Rep.
19	Winnebago	Thomas Wall	Oshkosh	Dem.
20	Sheboygan & Eastern Fond du Lac	Ignatius Klotz	Eden	Dem.
21	Marathon, Shawano, & Waupaca	John Ringle	Wausau	Dem.
22	Calumet & Outagamie	William Kennedy	Appleton	Dem.
23	Jefferson	William W. Reed	Jefferson	Dem.
24	Barron, Bayfield, Burnett, Douglas, Polk, St. Croix, & Washburn	Joel F. Nason	St. Croix Falls	Rep.
25	Eau Claire, Pepin, & Pierce	Hans Warner	Ellsworth	Rep.
26	Dane	James Conklin	Madison	Dem.
27	Adams, Columbia & Marquette	William T. Parry	Portage	Rep.
28	Iowa & Richland	Norman L. James	Richland Center	Rep.
29	Buffalo & Trempealeau	Noah D. Comstock	Arcadia	Rep.
30	Chippewa & Dunn	George C. Ginty	Chippewa Falls	Rep.
31	La Crosse	Donald A. McDonald	La Crosse	Dem.
32	Jackson & Monroe	Charles K. Erwin	Tomah	Rep.
33	Ozaukee & Washington	Edward R. Blake	Port Washington	Dem.

=== Members of the Assembly ===
Members of the Assembly for the Thirty-Seventh Wisconsin Legislature:

Assembly partisan composition Democratic: 39 seats Republican: 61 seats

Senate District	County	Dist.	Representative	Party	Residence
27	Adams & Marquette		James W. Perkins	Rep.	New Chester
11	Ashland, Lincoln, Price, & Taylor		John K. Parish	Rep.	Medford
24	Barron, Bayfield, Burnett, & Douglas		Charles S. Taylor	Rep.	Barron
02	Brown	1	Enos W. Persons	Dem.	De Pere
02	Brown	2	Albert L. Gray	Dem.	Fort Howard
29	Buffalo		Samuel D. Hubbard	Rep.	Mondovi
22	Calumet & Outagamie	1	Leopold Hammel	Dem.	Appleton
22	Calumet & Outagamie	2	William F. Cirkel	Dem.	Seymour
22	Calumet & Outagamie	3	William LaMure	Dem.	Kaukauna
22	Calumet & Outagamie	4	Leopold Strasser	Dem.	Stockbridge
30	Chippewa		Henry J. Goddard	Rep.	Chippewa Falls
11	Clark		James O'Neill	Rep.	Neillsville
27	Columbia	1	Ferdinand Schulze	Rep.	Portage
27	Columbia	2	Martin C. Hobart	Rep.	Fall River
04	Crawford		Thomas Curley	Dem.	Bell Center
26	Dane	1	William F. Vilas (until March 9, 1885)	Dem.	Madison
26	Dane	1	Michael J. Cantwell (from March 25, 1885)	Dem.	Madison
26	Dane	2	Charles E. Buell	Rep.	Sun Prairie
26	Dane	3	Henry C. Adams	Rep.	Madison
26	Dane	4	Christopher J. Rollis	Rep.	Oregon
26	Dane	5	Edward E. Fitzgibbon	Dem.	Westport
13	Dodge	1	Felix Lynch	Dem.	Elba
13	Dodge	2	John Leslie	Dem.	Juneau
13	Dodge	3	Andrew Bachhuber	Dem.	Lomira
13	Dodge	4	August Schoenwetter	Dem.	Lowell
01	Door		John Fetzer	Dem.	Forestville
30	Dunn		John M. Oddie	Rep.	Tiffany
25	Eau Claire		Thomas E. Williams	Rep.	Eau Claire
01	Florence & Marinette		Hiram O. Fairchild	Rep.	Marinette
18	Fond du Lac	1	Chester Hazen	Rep.	Springvale
18	Fond du Lac	2	Samuel B. Stanchfield	Rep.	Fond du Lac
20	Fond du Lac	3	Andrew Schmidlkofer	Dem.	Marshfield
16	Grant	1	James V. Hollman	Rep.	Platteville
16	Grant	2	William J. McCoy	Dem.	Lancaster
16	Grant	3	Rufus M. Day	Rep.	Mount Hope
12	Green	1	Daniel H. Morgan	Rep.	Albany
12	Green	2	Frederick W. Byers	Rep.	Monroe
09	Green Lake		Lorentus J. Brayton	Rep.	Marquette
28	Iowa	1	George G. Cox	Rep.	Mineral Point
28	Iowa	2	Jesse B. Huse	Rep.	Mifflin
32	Jackson		Thomas B. Mills	Rep.	Millston
23	Jefferson	1	Carl R. Feld	Dem.	Watertown
23	Jefferson	2	Samuel A. Craig	Dem.	Fort Atkinson
14	Juneau		Edmund Hart	Rep.	Elroy
08	Kenosha		Andrew Patterson	Rep.	Salem
01	Kewaunee		Joseph E. Darbellay	Dem.	Kewaunee
31	La Crosse		Charles Linse	Rep.	Shelby
12	Lafayette	1	John Mason	Rep.	Wiota
12	Lafayette	2	Charles Priestley	Dem.	Shullsburg
01	Langlade & Oconto		William H. Young	Rep.	Oconto
15	Manitowoc	1	Joseph Miller	Dem.	Maple Grove
15	Manitowoc	2	John Robinson	Dem.	Kossuth
15	Manitowoc	3	Charles E. Estabrook	Rep.	Manitowoc
21	Marathon		Sebastian Kronenwetter	Dem.	Mosinee
05	Milwaukee	1	Hugh Ryan	Dem.	Milwaukee
07	Milwaukee	2	George Poppert	Dem.	Milwaukee
07	Milwaukee	3	Michael P. Walsh	Dem.	Milwaukee
07	Milwaukee	4	Robert W. Pierce	Rep.	Milwaukee
06	Milwaukee	5	Daniel Hooker	Dem.	Milwaukee
05	Milwaukee	6	John Lagrand	Rep.	Milwaukee
07	Milwaukee	7	Jacob E. Friend	Rep.	Milwaukee
06	Milwaukee	8	Frank Haderer	Dem.	Milwaukee
05	Milwaukee	9	Gottfried Inden	Dem.	Milwaukee
05	Milwaukee	10	Charles Elkert	Rep.	Milwaukee
05	Milwaukee	11	Frederick G. Isenring	Rep.	Whitefish Bay
06	Milwaukee	12	James Lemont	Rep.	Bay View
32	Monroe	1	William H. Blyton	Rep.	Sparta
32	Monroe	2	Levi Wallace	Rep.	Sheldon
33	Ozaukee		John J. Race	Dem.	Fredonia
25	Pepin		Vivus W. Dorwin	Rep.	Durand
25	Pierce		Jesse B. Thayer	Rep.	River Falls
24	Polk		Frank Nye	Rep.	Clear Lake
09	Portage		Albert W. Sanborn	Rep.	Stevens Point
03	Racine	1	Louis C. Klein	Rep.	Racine
03	Racine	2	Adam Apple	Dem.	Norway
28	Richland		Charles G. Thomas	Rep.	Buena Vista
17	Rock	1	John Smiley	Rep.	Plymouth
17	Rock	2	Pliny Norcross	Rep.	Janesville
17	Rock	3	James C. Bartholf	Rep.	Milton
14	Sauk	1	Evan W. Evans	Dem.	Spring Green
14	Sauk	2	Alfred F. Lawton	Rep.	Winfield
21	Shawano		Marion Wescott	Rep.	Shawano
20	Sheboygan	1	Tarrett C. Sharp	Dem.	Elkhart Lake
20	Sheboygan	2	John E. Dennis Jr.	Dem.	Greenbush
20	Sheboygan	3	Henry Walvoord	Rep.	Holland
24	St. Croix		Thomas Porter	Rep.	New Richmond
29	Trempealeau		Andrew H. Lewis	Rep.	Hale
04	Vernon	1	Philip Bouffleur	Rep.	Jefferson
04	Vernon	2	Samuel Sloggy	Rep.	Whitestown
08	Walworth	1	John B. Johnson	Rep.	Darien
08	Walworth	2	James C. Reynolds	Rep.	Lake Geneva
33	Washington	1	James Kenealy	Dem.	Erin
33	Washington	2	Frederick C. Schuler	Dem.	Farmington
10	Waukesha		John Stephens	Rep.	Waukesha
21	Waupaca	1	Andrew G. Nelson	Rep.	Waupaca
21	Waupaca	2	Ambrose S. McDonald	Rep.	Marion
09	Waushara		Samuel R. Clark	Rep.	Bloomfield
19	Winnebago	1	Andrew Haben	Dem.	Oshkosh
19	Winnebago	2	Charles B. Clark	Rep.	Neenah
19	Winnebago	3	Frank Challoner	Rep.	Omro
11	Wood		Thomas E. Nash	Dem.	Centralia

== Committees ==
=== Senate committees ===
- Senate Committee on Agriculture
- Senate Committee on Assessment and Collection of Taxes
- Senate Committee on Education
- Senate Committee on Enrolled Bills
- Senate Committee on Engrossed Bills
- Senate Committee on Federal Relations
- Senate Committee on Finance, Banks, and Insurance
- Senate Committee on Incorporations
- Senate Committee on the Judiciary
- Senate Committee on Legislative Expenditures
- Senate Committee on Manufactures and Commerce
- Senate Committee on Military Affairs
- Senate Committee on Privileges and Elections
- Senate Committee on Public Lands
- Senate Committee on Railroads
- Senate Committee on Roads and Bridges
- Senate Committee on State Affairs
- Senate Committee on Town and County Organizations

=== Assembly committees ===
- Assembly Committee on Agriculture – Chester Hazen, chair
- Assembly Committee on Assessment and Collection of Taxes – C. E. Estabrook, chair
- Assembly Committee on Bills on their Third Reading – John K. Parish, chair
- Assembly Committee on Cities – J. E. Friend, chair
- Assembly Committee on Education – C. E. Buell, chair
- Assembly Committee on Engrossed Bills – Samuel B. Stanchfield, chair
- Assembly Committee on Enrolled Bills – R. W. Pierce, chair
- Assembly Committee on Federal Relations – A. W. Sanborn, chair
- Assembly Committee on Incorporations – Marion Wescott, chair
- Assembly Committee on Insurance, Banks, and Banking – W. H. Blyton, chair
- Assembly Committee on the Judiciary – Pliny Norcross, chair
- Assembly Committee on Legislative Expenditures – S. D. Hubbard, chair
- Assembly Committee on Lumber and Manufactures – Thomas B. Mills, chair
- Assembly Committee on Medical Societies – J. C. Reynolds, chair
- Assembly Committee on Militia – F. W. Byers, chair
- Assembly Committee on Privileges and Elections – Charles G. Thomas, chair
- Assembly Committee on Public Improvements – M. C. Hobart, chair
- Assembly Committee on Railroads – H. J. Goddard, chair
- Assembly Committee on Roads and Bridges – George G. Cox, chair
- Assembly Committee on State Lands – S. R. Clark, chair
- Assembly Committee on State Affairs – L. J. Brayton, chair
- Assembly Committee on Town and County Organization – William H. Young, chair
- Assembly Committee on Ways and Means – Thomas Porter, chair

=== Joint committees ===
- Joint Committee on Charitable and Penal Institutions
- Joint Committee on Claims
- Joint Committee on Printing

== Employees ==
=== Senate employees ===
- Chief Clerk: Charles E. Bross
  - Assistant Clerk: Fred W. Coon
  - Bookkeeper: J. H. Whitney
  - Engrossing Clerk: J. M. Hayden
  - Enrolling Clerk: E. S. Hotchkiss
  - Transcribing Clerk: F. J. Turner
  - Proofreader: Adelbert D. Thorp
  - Clerk for the Judiciary Committee: Willard W. D. Turner
  - Clerk for the Committee on Enrolled Bills: John O. Newgard
  - Clerk for the Committee on Engrossed Bills: John O. Newgard
  - Clerk for the Committee on Claims: John O. Newgard
  - Document Clerk: J. J. Marshall
- Sergeant-at-Arms: Hubert Wolcott
  - Assistant Sergeant-at-Arms: T. J. George
- Postmaster: J. F. McKenzie
  - Assistant Postmaster: George A. Ludington
- Gallery Attendant: Michael Bransfield
- Document Room Attendant: Frank Partridge
- Doorkeepers:
  - John C. Frisvold
  - Frederick H. Johnson
  - Alvah Eaton
  - William Crank
- Porter: O. J. Wiley
- Night Watch: H. Worthington
- Janitor: Daniel Corbett
- Messengers:
  - W. M. Smith
  - Ben Smith
  - Lemuel Parry
  - Elliot B. Davis
  - Ferdinand Werner
  - Adolph Glenz
  - Willis Melville
  - Werner Pressentine
  - Guy Paine

=== Assembly employees ===
- Chief Clerk: Edwin Coe
  - 1st Assistant Clerk: John W. DeGroff
    - 2nd Assistant Clerk: Theodore W. Goldin
  - Bookkeeper: J. T. Huntington
  - Engrossing Clerk: Egbert Wyman
  - Enrolling Clerk: L. J. Burlingame
  - Transcribing Clerk: Ellis C. Oliver
  - Proofreader: D. P. Beach
  - Clerk for the Judiciary Committee: Frank D. Jackson
  - Clerk for the Committee on Enrolled Bills: Robert W. Pierce Jr.
  - Clerk for the Committee on Engrossed Bills: Warren Meiklejohn
  - Document Clerk: H. G. Brown
- Sergeant-at-Arms: John M. Ewing
  - Assistant Sergeant-at-Arms: William A. Adamson
- Postmaster: J. H. Young
  - Assistant Postmaster: Frank M. Durkee
- Doorkeepers:
  - W. A. Mayhew
  - G. W. Dart
  - A. A. Curtis
  - Fred Dewey
- Fireman: W. J. Bendixon
- Gallery Attendants:
  - Goetlieb Schuebbert
  - W. Muntz
- Committee Room Attendant: L. B. Kinney
- Document Room Attendant: John H. Pulcifer
- Porter: James Nolan
- Policeman: Ed. Dempey
- Flagman: F. O. Janzen
- Night Watch: Michael J. Wallrich
- Wash Room Attendant: Bertie Oftelie
- Messengers:
  - James Howley
  - Willie Gillett
  - Willie Baker
  - Herman Schulze
  - Eugene Wescott
  - Charles McGee
  - Eddie Sherman
  - Willie Robson
  - Clifford Best
  - Willie Smith
  - Lewis Adams
