= Evan W. Evans =

19th century American politician

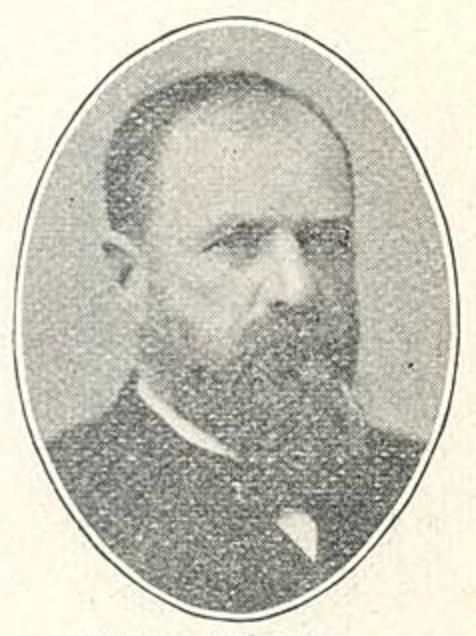

Member of the Wisconsin State Assembly
- In office January 7, 1901 – January 5, 1905
- Preceded by: John E. Morgan
- Succeeded by: David B. Hulburt
- Constituency: Sauk 2nd district
- In office January 5, 1885 – January 7, 1889
- Preceded by: Carl C. Kuntz
- Succeeded by: Thomas Hill
- Constituency: Sauk 1st district

Personal details
- Born: June 13, 1841 Wales, UK
- Died: August 6, 1917 (aged 76) Spring Green, Wisconsin, U.S.
- Resting place: Spring Green Cemetery, Spring Green, Wisconsin
- Party: Democratic
- Spouse: Mary Ellen Jones (m. 1869–1917)
- Children: Emma Frances Evans^{(b. 1869; died 1933)}; George B. Evans^{(b. 1871; died 1946)}; Mary Margaret Evans^{(b. 1873; died 1947)}; Isaac C. Evans^{(b. 1879; died 1954)}; Lillian Helen Evans^{(b. 1881; died 1927)}; Alice E. (Steeps)^{(b. 1883; died 1960)}

Military service
- Allegiance: United States
- Branch/service: United States Volunteers; Union Army
- Years of service: 1861–1864
- Rank: Corporal, USV
- Unit: 6th Bty. Wis. Lt. Artillery
- Battles/wars: American Civil War

Evan W. Evans (June 13, 1841 – August 6, 1917) was a Welsh American immigrant, farmer, Democratic politician, and Wisconsin pioneer. He was a member of the Wisconsin State Assembly for eight years, representing Sauk County. He also served in the Union Army through most of the American Civil War.

== Biography ==
Born June 13, 1841, in Wales, Evans came with his family to the United States in 1842, at first to Pennsylvania; the family then moved to Wisconsin in 1849 and settled in the town of Spring Green, Sauk County. Evans lived much of the rest of his life in Spring Green. He was educated in public schools with some academic education. During the American Civil War, he served with the 6th Independent Battery Wisconsin Light Artillery. Conflicts he took part in include the Battle of Island Number Ten, the Siege of Corinth, the Second Battle of Corinth, the Battle of Raymond, the Battle of Jackson, Mississippi, the Battle of Champion Hill, the Battle of Big Black River Bridge, the Siege of Vicksburg, and Sherman's March to the Sea.

== Public office ==
Evans had held various local positions, such as town treasurer, assessor, chairman of the town board and supervisor of the village, before first elected to the first Sauk County Assembly district (the Towns of Bear Creek, Franklin, Honey Creek, Ironton, Merrimac, Prairie du Sac, Sumpter, Spring Green, Troy, Washington and Westfield) in 1884, with 1327 votes, against 1151 votes for Republican Christian Sprecher and 92 for Peter Schueller of the Prohibition Party (the incumbent, Carl C. Kuntz, was not a candidate). He was assigned to the standing committee on railroads. He was re-elected in 1886, with 1175 votes to 1105 for Republican D. D. Davis and 148 for Prohibitionist H. E. Stone. He was not a candidate in 1888, instead serving as the Democratic candidate for state insurance commissioner. He lost, with 154,951 votes to Democrat Philip Cheek, Jr. with 176,153 votes, Prohibitionist S. M. Bixby (14,511) and 8,695 for Ritner Stephens of the Labor Party. Evans was succeeded in the Assembly by Republican Thomas Hill (who like Evans was a British-born farmer and livestock dealer from Spring Green).

In 1894, Evans was the Democratic nominee for Wisconsin's 27th State Senate district, losing to Republican William F. Conger, with 1194 votes to Conger's 1453 and 390 for Prohibitionist Joseph Wood.

Evans returned to the Assembly in 1900 from what was now the 2nd Sauk County District (Towns of Bear Creek, Franklin, Honey Creek, Ironton, La Valle, Reedsburg, Spring Green, Troy, Washington, Westfield, Winfield, Woodland; the Villages of La Valle and Spring Green; and the City of Reedsburg), with 1835 votes to 1553 for Republican James A. Stone and 104 for Henry B. Hemmerly of the Prohibition Party. He was assigned to the committee on state affairs. He was re-elected in 1902, with 1186 votes to 1139 for Republican Edward C. Gottry and 103 for Prohibitionist F. I. Houghton. He was not a candidate for re-election in 1904, and was succeeded by Republican David B. Hulburt.

== Later years ==
Evans died August 6, 1917, survived by a wife and seven children. He was described as one of the best-known and most trusted livestock dealers in the region.

Party political offices
Preceded by John Carel	Democratic nominee for Commissioner of Insurance of Wisconsin; 1888	Succeeded by Wilbur M. Root
Wisconsin State Assembly
Preceded by Carl C. Kuntz	Member of the Wisconsin State Assembly for the Sauk 1st district January 5, 1885 – January 7, 1889	Succeeded by Thomas Hill
Preceded by John E. Morgan	Member of the Wisconsin State Assembly for the Sauk 2nd district January 7, 1901 – January 5, 1905	Succeeded by David B. Hulburt
