= Walter Maxwell =

American politician (1836–1895)

Walter S. Maxwell
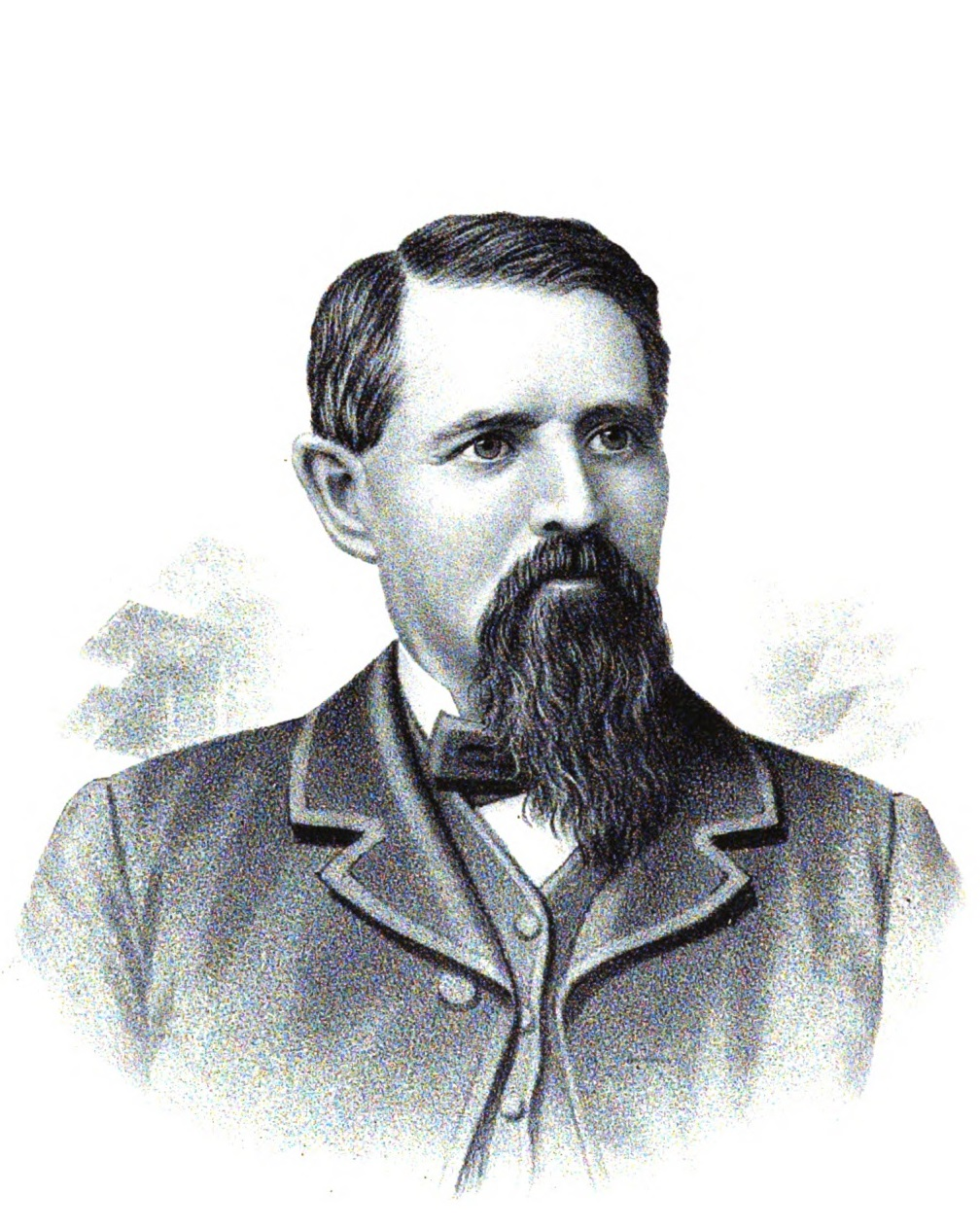
- From Portrait and Biographical Album of Racine and Kenosha Counties (1892)

Member of the Wisconsin Senate from the 8th district
- In office January 5, 1885 – January 7, 1889
- Preceded by: Charles Palmetier
- Succeeded by: James C. Reynolds

Member of the Wisconsin State Assembly from the Kenosha district
- In office January 1, 1883 – January 5, 1885
- Preceded by: John B. Vosburgh
- Succeeded by: Andrew Patterson
- In office January 3, 1881 – January 2, 1882
- Preceded by: Cornelius Williams
- Succeeded by: John B. Vosburgh
- In office January 1, 1877 – January 7, 1878
- Preceded by: Frederick Robinson
- Succeeded by: Walter L. Dexter

Personal details
- Born: September 12, 1836 Jackson, New York, U.S.
- Died: August 17, 1895 (aged 58) Superior, Wisconsin, U.S.
- Resting place: Green Ridge Cemetery, Kenosha, Wisconsin
- Party: Republican
- Spouses: Annie M. Robinson (died 1874); Annie A. Beach (m. 1876; died 1878); Cornelia McLean (m. 1880; died 1898)
- Children: Elmer A. Maxwell^{(b. 1865; died 1951)}
- Relatives: Robert A. Maxwell (brother)

Walter S. Maxwell (September 12, 1836 – August 17, 1895) was an American farmer, businessman, and Republican politician from Kenosha County, Wisconsin. He represented Kenosha County for four years as a member of the Wisconsin Senate (1885–1889) and served three years in the State Assembly (1877, 1881, 1883).

== Biography ==
Maxwell was born on September 12, 1836, in Jackson, New York. He was raised on his father's farm and attended common schools and the State Normal School. He taught school for a few years, then moved west to Wisconsin in 1860, settling in Kenosha County. He purchased a tract of unimproved land in what is now Somers, Wisconsin, and cultivated it into a productive farm.

Maxwell cast his first presidential vote for Abraham Lincoln in 1860, and remained a Republican for the rest of his life. He was elected to eight consecutive terms as chairman of the town board of Somers, from 1874 through 1881, and then served as chairman of the town board and chairman of the Kenosha County board of supervisors in 1884.

He first ran for Wisconsin State Assembly in 1875, but was defeated by Democrat Frederick Robinson. He made another attempt in 1876—with higher voter turnout in a Presidential election year—and defeated Democrat Robert S. Houston. He did not run again in 1877, but was elected to two subsequent terms in 1880 and 1882. During these years, his Assembly district comprised all of Kenosha County.

In 1884, he was elected to a four-year term in the Wisconsin State Senate, representing Wisconsin's 8th State Senate district. The 8th Senate district then comprised Kenosha and Walworth counties. He was not a candidate for re-election in 1888.

After leaving office, he purchased an ownership stake in the Arcadian Brown Stone Company, a brown sandstone quarry in Superior, Wisconsin. He split his time between Superior and Kenosha for the rest of his life, generally spending summers in Superior and winters in Kenosha. He died in Superior on August 17, 1895. His death was sudden and unexpected, having appeared to be in good health in the days leading up to his death.

== Personal life and family ==
Walter Maxwell was one of ten children born to Alexander Maxwell and his wife Jane (née Alexander). Walter's elder sister Mary married Robert Graham, the 12th Wisconsin Superintendent of Public Instruction. His younger brother, Robert A. Maxwell, was New York State Treasurer during the 1880s.

Walter Maxwell married three times. His first wife was Anna A. Robinson, who he married at Easton, New York. They had one son, Elmer, before her death in 1874. He next married Anna A. Greenbaum (née Beach), who died just two years later, in 1878. He finally married Cornelia McLean in 1880, who survived him. Elmer A. Maxwell, from his first marriage, was his only known offspring.

== Electoral history ==
=== Wisconsin Assembly (1875, 1876) ===
Wisconsin Assembly, Kenosha District Election, 1875
Party	Candidate	Votes	%	±%
General Election, November 2, 1875
Democratic	Frederick Robinson	1,202	54.00%	
Republican	Walter S. Maxwell	1,024	46.00%	−9.24%
Plurality		178	8.00%	-2.49%
Total votes		2,226	100.0%	-7.33%
Democratic hold				

Wisconsin Assembly, Kenosha District Election, 1876
Party	Candidate	Votes	%	±%
General Election, November 7, 1876
Republican	Walter S. Maxwell	1,672	54.96%	+8.96%
Democratic	Robert S. Houston	1,374	45.04%	
Plurality		302	9.93%	
Total votes		3,042	100.0%	+36.66%
Republican gain from Democratic				

=== Wisconsin Assembly (1880) ===
Wisconsin Assembly, Kenosha District Election, 1880
Party	Candidate	Votes	%	±%
General Election, November 2, 1880
Republican	Walter S. Maxwell	1,650	53.69%	−5.73%
Democratic	John G. Fleming	1,423	46.31%	
Plurality		227	7.39%	-11.45%
Total votes		3,073	100.0%	+43.67%
Republican hold				

=== Wisconsin Assembly (1882) ===
Wisconsin Assembly, Kenosha District Election, 1882
Party	Candidate	Votes	%	±%
General Election, November 7, 1882
Republican	Walter S. Maxwell	1,385	52.38%	−4.81%
Democratic	Nicholas Spartz	1,259	47.62%	
Plurality		126	4.77%	-9.61%
Total votes		2,644	100.0%	+23.03%
Republican hold				

=== Wisconsin Senate (1884) ===
Wisconsin Senate, 8th District Election, 1884
Party	Candidate	Votes	%	±%
General Election, November 4, 1884
Republican	Walter S. Maxwell	5,920	58.42%	−9.48%
Democratic	Andrew Kull Jr.	3,620	35.72%	+3.63%
Prohibition	Cooley E. Wing	593	5.85%	
Plurality		2,300	22.70%	-13.12%
Total votes		10,133	100.0%	+83.94%
Republican hold				

Wisconsin State Assembly
Preceded by Frederick Robinson	Member of the Wisconsin State Assembly from the Kenosha district January 1, 1877 – January 7, 1878	Succeeded by Walter L. Dexter
Preceded by Cornelius Williams	Member of the Wisconsin State Assembly from the Kenosha district January 3, 1881 – January 2, 1882	Succeeded by John B. Vosburgh
Preceded by John B. Vosburgh	Member of the Wisconsin State Assembly from the Kenosha district January 1, 1883 – January 5, 1885	Succeeded by Andrew Patterson
Wisconsin Senate
Preceded by Charles Palmetier	Member of the Wisconsin Senate from the 8th district January 5, 1885 – January 7, 1889	Succeeded by James C. Reynolds
