= Inden =

Inden may refer to:

== People ==
- Gottfried Inden (1827–1896), American politician
- Ronald Inden, American indologist

== Places ==
- Inden, North Rhine-Westphalia, Germany
- Inden, Switzerland
