= Isenring =

Isenring is a surname. Notable people with the surname include:

- Frederick G. Isenring (1854–?), American politician and businessman
- Johann Baptist Isenring (1796–1860), Swiss painter and printer
