= Sheldon, Wisconsin =

Sheldon, Wisconsin may refer to:

- Sheldon, Monroe County, Wisconsin, a town
- Sheldon, Rusk County, Wisconsin, a village
