= That's Amazing =

American YouTube channel

YouTube information
- Channels: That's Amazing; That's Amazing Shorts
- Years active: 2015–present
- Genre: Trick shots
- Subscribers: 5.81 million (main channel); 19.4 million (That's Amazing Shorts)
- Views: 1.97 billion (main channel); 7.34 billion (That's Amazing Shorts)
- Last updated: April 13, 2026

That's Amazing is an American YouTube channel run by brothers Thomas "Tommy" End and Matthew End. Both from Whitefish Bay, Wisconsin, they primarily focus their content around trick shots, gaining virality in 2016 from their bottle flipping.

== Career ==
Tommy created the channel in 2012, originally to share videos he made about drawing and video games with his family. When bottle flipping became popular in 2016, Tommy and Matthew were inspired by Dude Perfect to upload their own video, going viral. The brothers were initially only allowed to film outside, but, following the success of their first video, took their filming in the house.

== Personal life ==
Both were born in Whitefish Bay, Wisconsin to Jim and Laura End. They have five other siblings. Tommy and Matthew have both played soccer and basketball for amateur teams.

In October 2024, Tommy became engaged to his girlfriend, and on July 20, 2026, he announced that he had gotten married.

== Content ==
That's Amazing performs a variety of trick shots on their channel, including bottle flipping, card throwing, dice stacking, and throwing frisbees into basketball hoops. Colin's proficiency in dice stacking has led him to appear on Live with Kelly and Ryan. Tommy is the channel's video editor.
