= Bertha E. Reynolds =

American physician

- Born: May 22, 1868; Thiensville, Wisconsin, U.S.
- Died: October 31, 1961 (aged 93); Dodgeville, Wisconsin, U.S.
- Occupation: physician

Bertha E. Reynolds (May 22, 1868 – October 31, 1961), known in her community as "Dr. Bertha," was a rural medical doctor in south central Wisconsin, and one of the state's first licensed female physicians, practicing medicine in and around Lone Rock and Avoca from 1902 to 1953.

== Youth and education ==
Bertha Elizabeth Reynolds was born in Thiensville, Wisconsin, in 1868. Her parents, John and Margaret Reynolds, had migrated to Milwaukee, Wisconsin, from Quebec, Canada, three years earlier. Reynolds grew up in Ozaukee County, Wisconsin, on her family's farm. In 1892, the Reynolds family moved to Lincoln, Nebraska, where Bertha enrolled in the Lincoln Normal School, afterwards working briefly as a teacher. But she had long harbored a desire to become a doctor, as nine other members of her family (both brothers and cousins) had done. One cousin, Walter H. Neilson, the first dean of the medical school at Marquette University, discouraged her, indicating that medicine was an inappropriate career for women. She matriculated at the University of Nebraska, where she was also discouraged from pursuing the MD. In 1898, thirty-year-old Reynolds nevertheless enrolled in the Woman's Hospital Medical College of Chicago; she completed her MD in 1901.

== Medical practice ==
Upon graduation she returned to Wisconsin, joining the Lone Rock, Wisconsin (Richland County, Wisconsin) practice of a brother, Dr. Nelson Reynolds (1872-1910). When Nelson Reynolds relocated to Milwaukee, Wisconsin, Dr. Bertha Reynolds became the area's only physician, her practice predating by about twenty years the better-known work of another pioneering Wisconsin physician, Dr. Kate Pelham Newcomb). A 1923 incident in which Reynolds, unable to reach patients due to Spring flooding, drafted then-unknown aviator Charles Lindbergh to transport her to patients across the Wisconsin River, has been well remembered by residents. Dr. Reynolds would sometimes take elderly patients into her own home until they were well enough to care for themselves. In the 1930s she also served on the Richland County Children's Board. Reynolds attempted to retire in 1940, moving to Avoca, Wisconsin, but when that town's only physician was called to service in World War II, she returned to work, serving Avoca patients until her second retirement in 1953.

== Later years and memorialization ==
Reynolds received several awards during her lifetime, including a Distinguished Service Award from the University of Wisconsin–Madison. She died October 31, 1961, at the age of 93, and is buried in the Little Brown Church cemetery in Bear Valley. The town of Lone Rock dedicated a park to her memory; a street in Lone Rock has been named for her as well. Her medical apparatus, including her bag and scalpels, were donated to the State Historical Society of Wisconsin.

== Bibliography ==
- Thayer, Earl R. and Steve Bussalachi. “First in their class: Wisconsin's pioneering women physicians.” Wisconsin Academy Review (Spring 2005), 51-62.
- Coopey, Judith Redline. "A Life of Service." Wisconsin Trails, Vol 18, No.3, (Autumn 1977), 30.
- Coopey, Judith Redline. "She Flew With Lindbergh" Scholastic Newstime, Vol 48, No. 27 (5 May 1977), 2.
- Durbin, Richard D. The Wisconsin River: An Odyssey Through Time and Space. Spring Freshet Press, 1997.
- Gard, Robert Edward. This is Wisconsin. Wisconsin House, 1969.
- Sherr, Lynn. American Women's Gazetteer. Bantam Books, 1976.
- State Medical Society of Wisconsin. Wisconsin Medical Journal. Vol. 15, 1917.
