= Walter L. Dexter =

19th century American politician (1841-1920)

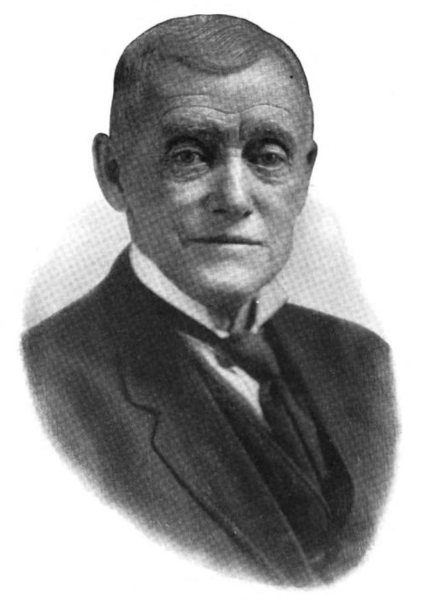

Sheriff of Kenosha County, Wisconsin
- In office January 1, 1883 – January 5, 1885
- Preceded by: Horace G. Blackman
- Succeeded by: Eleazer Robert Wilson

Member of the Wisconsin State Assembly from the Kenosha County district
- In office January 7, 1878 – January 6, 1879
- Preceded by: Walter Maxwell
- Succeeded by: Joseph V. Quarles

Personal details
- Born: Walter Lovejoy Dexter; December 19, 1841 Pleasant Prairie, Wisconsin Territory
- Died: June 17, 1920 (aged 78) Pleasant Prairie, Wisconsin, U.S.
- Resting place: Spring Brook Cemetery, Pleasant Prairie
- Party: Democratic
- Spouse: Catherine Johnson (m. 1860; died 1899)
- Children: William H. Dexter^{(b. 1861; died 1914)}; Charles Jackson Dexter^{(b. 1862; died 1929)}; Jennie (Browne)^{(b. 1864; died 1924)}; Mary Louise (Dewey)^{(b. 1866; died 1928)}; Walter Sydney Dexter^{(b. 1868; died 1949)}; Flora Belle Dexter^{(b. 1870; died 1944)}
- Occupation: Farmer, politician

Walter Lovejoy Dexter (December 19, 1841 – June 17, 1920) was an American farmer and Democratic politician from Kenosha County, Wisconsin. He served one term in the Wisconsin State Assembly (1878), and served two years as sheriff of Kenosha County. He was a major landowner in the early years of the town of Pleasant Prairie, Wisconsin, and served several years as town treasurer and town board chairman.

== Biography ==
Walter Dexter was born on his family's farm in what is now the village of Pleasant Prairie, Kenosha County, Wisconsin. At the time of his birth, the area was still part of Racine County in the Wisconsin Territory. Dexter's family had settled in the area just five years earlier, and were some of the earliest American settlers in the region.

His father died shortly after his birth. His mother remarried with English widower James Cole Dowse, another significant landowner in Pleasant Prairie. Dexter inherited 211 acres from his father, and his paternal grandfather—also an extensive landowner in the Wisconsin Territory—acted as caretaker of his financial assets until he reached adulthood. His grandfather sold off 131 acres of his inheritance, then left him an additional 67 acres of his own estate when he died in 1862. Dexter subsequently expanded his estate, purchasing another 80 acres, and remained a prosperous farmer for his entire life. He was particularly successful in raising horses and dairy cows; the large Dexter family estate along with several neighboring estates—many owned by relatives of Dexter—came to be known as "Dexter's Corners".

He was elected town treasurer of Pleasant Prairie in 1868 and 1869, and was then elected chairman of the town board in 1872, 1874, 1875, and 1876.

In 1877, Dexter was the Democratic Party nominee for Wisconsin State Assembly in the Kenosha County district. He won the election, defeating Republican Henry Blackman by 24 votes.

After his term in the legislature, he was elected town chairman again in 1879. He made his first run for sheriff of Kenosha County in 1880, but lost the election to Horace Blackman by just 5 votes. Two years later, he made another attempt at sheriff and won the election, defeating Republican George Hale.

Dexter next ran for public office in 1886, running as the Democratic nominee for Kenosha County treasurer. He lost the general election to the Republican incumbent, Horace E. Clark. Dexter was not a candidate for elected office again, but remained active in the local Democratic Party and was a frequent attendee of local caucuses.

== Personal life and family ==
Walter Dexter was a son of John Jackson Dexter and his wife Sarah (née Lovejoy) of Chautauqua County, New York. Sarah Lovejoy's father, Abijah Lovejoy, was one of the earliest pioneers of Lake County, Illinois. John Jackson Dexter owned a mill in Jamestown, New York, and the nearby hamlet of Dexterville was named in his honor; he came to the Wisconsin Territory in 1837 with his father, John Dexter. The elder John Dexter speculated extensively on land in Kenosha County; he purchased 13 tracts of land of 80 acres each, and gradually sold off parcels to new settlers. John Dexter was also a veteran of the War of 1812 and was chairman of Racine County board of supervisors in 1846; his father Samuel Dexter had served in the 4th Connecticut Regiment in the American Revolutionary War. The Dexter family were descendants of Gregory Dexter, a Mayflower passenger and the 7th colonial president of Providence and Warwick.

Walter Dexter's father, John Jackson Dexter, died in 1845 at age 29. His mother then married another prominent early settler, widower James C. Dowse, and had another son, Byron C. Dowse. James Dowse also had four children from his previous marriage, who became Walter's step-siblings.

Walter Dexter married Irish American immigrant Catherine Johnson on June 15, 1860. They had six children together and were married for 39 years before Catherine's death in 1899.

Throughout his life, in addition to managing his farm and his public duties, Dexter was also active in local agricultural organizations, like the Kenosha County Horse Owners Protective Association and the Pleasant Prairie Fire Insurance Cooperative, and fraternal organizations like the Modern Woodmen of America and Freemasonry.

Dexter died at his family's farm in Pleasant Prairie on June 17, 1920, after a long illness. He was interred at Spring Brook Cemetery in Pleasant Prairie, the cemetery sits on land donated by Walter Dexter's grandfather, John Dexter.

== Electoral history ==
=== Wisconsin Assembly (1877) ===
Wisconsin Assembly, Kenosha County District Election, 1877
Party	Candidate	Votes	%	±%
Democratic	Walter L. Dexter	953	50.64%	−4.32pp
Republican	Henry Blackman	929	49.36%	
Plurality		24	1.28%	
Total votes		1,882	100.0%	-38.13%
Democratic gain from Republican				

=== Kenosha County sheriff (1880, 1882) ===
Kenosha County Sheriff Election, 1880
Party	Candidate	Votes	%	±%
Republican	Horace G. Blackman	1,542	50.05%	
Democratic	Walter L. Dexter	1,537	49.89%	
	Scattering	2	0.06%	
Plurality		5	0.16%	
Total votes		3,081	100.0%	
Republican gain from Democratic				

Kenosha County Sheriff Election, 1882
Party	Candidate	Votes	%	±%
Democratic	Walter L. Dexter	1,584	60.05%	+10.16pp
Republican	George Hale	1,054	39.95%	
Plurality		530	20.09%	
Total votes		2,638	100.0%	-14.38%
Democratic gain from Republican				

=== Kenosha County treasurer (1886) ===
Kenosha County Treasurer Election, 1886
Party	Candidate	Votes	%	±%
Republican	Horace E. Clark (incumbent)	1,680	57.61%	
Democratic	Walter L. Dexter	1,236	42.39%	
Plurality		444	15.23%	
Total votes		2,916	100.0%	
Republican hold				

Wisconsin State Assembly
Preceded by Walter Maxwell	Member of the Wisconsin State Assembly from the Kenosha County district January 7, 1878 – January 6, 1879	Succeeded by Joseph V. Quarles
Legal offices
Preceded by Horace G. Blackman	Sheriff of Kenosha County, Wisconsin; January 1, 1883 – January 5, 1885	Succeeded by Eleazer Robert Wilson
