= Lone Rock, Wisconsin =

- Village
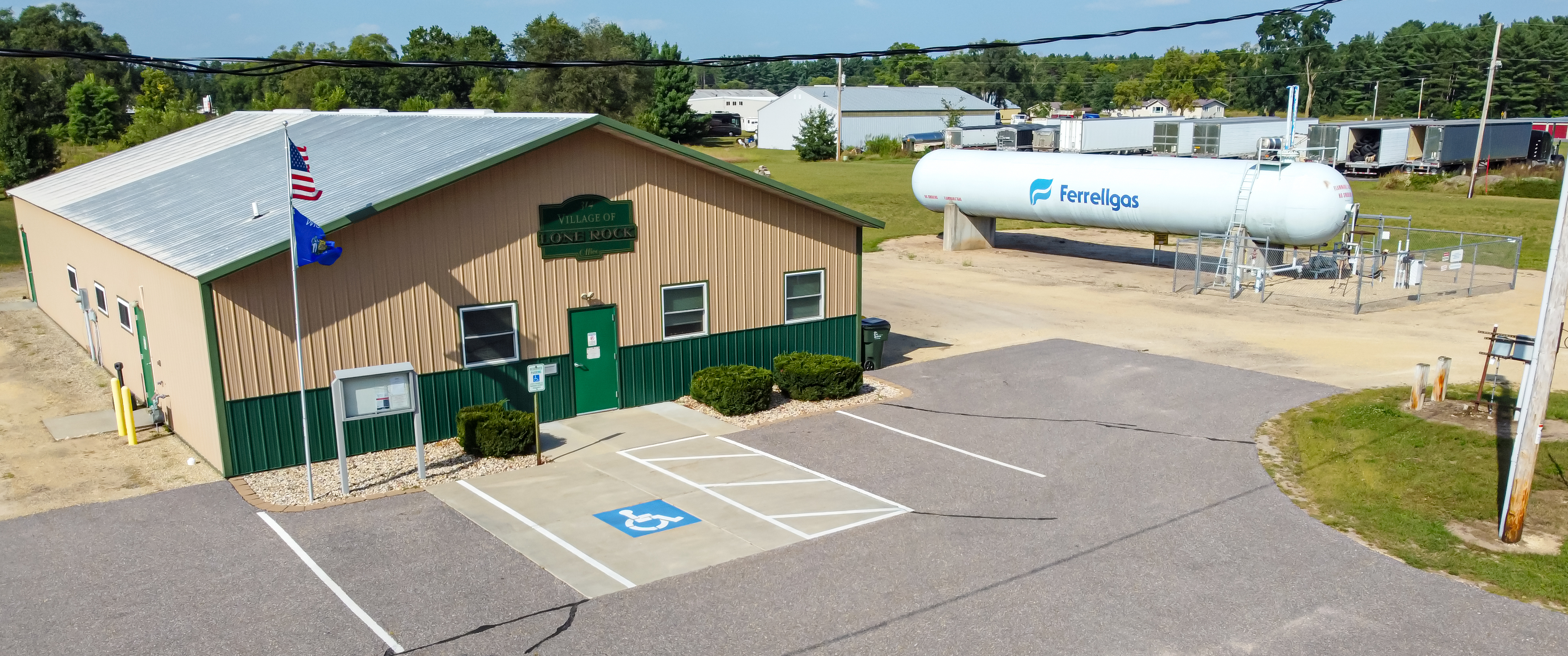
- Village hall

- Location of Lone Rock in Richland County, Wisconsin.
- Coordinates: 43°11′3″N 90°11′54″W
- Country: United States
- State: Wisconsin
- County: Richland

Area
  - Total: 1.00 sq mi (2.58 km^{2})
  - Land: 1.00 sq mi (2.58 km^{2})
  - Water: 0 sq mi (0.00 km^{2})
- Elevation: 709 ft (216 m)

Population (2020)
  - Total: 829
  - Density: 832/sq mi (321/km^{2})
- Time zone: UTC-6 (Central (CST))
  - Summer (DST): UTC-5 (CDT)
- Area code: 608
- FIPS code: 55-45575
- GNIS feature ID: 1568511
- Website: villageoflonerock-wi.gov

Lone Rock is a village in Richland County, Wisconsin, United States. The population was 829 at the 2020 census. The village is named after a sandstone outcrop.

== History ==
According to a sign near the site, "The Lone Rock - At one time a massive piece of sandstone stood a short distance from the north bank of the Wisconsin River. The rock became a landmark for early river raftsmen and was known as 'Lone Rock' from which the town took its name. The rock was cut and used for basements and foundations in the village. What is left of the rock is located west of Highway 130 across from Brace Park."

The community was founded in 1856 and incorporated as a village in 1866. Among its best-known residents is Bertha E. Reynolds, or "Dr. Bertha," the physician who served the community in the early twentieth century. A park and street in Lone Rock honor Reynolds.

== Geography ==
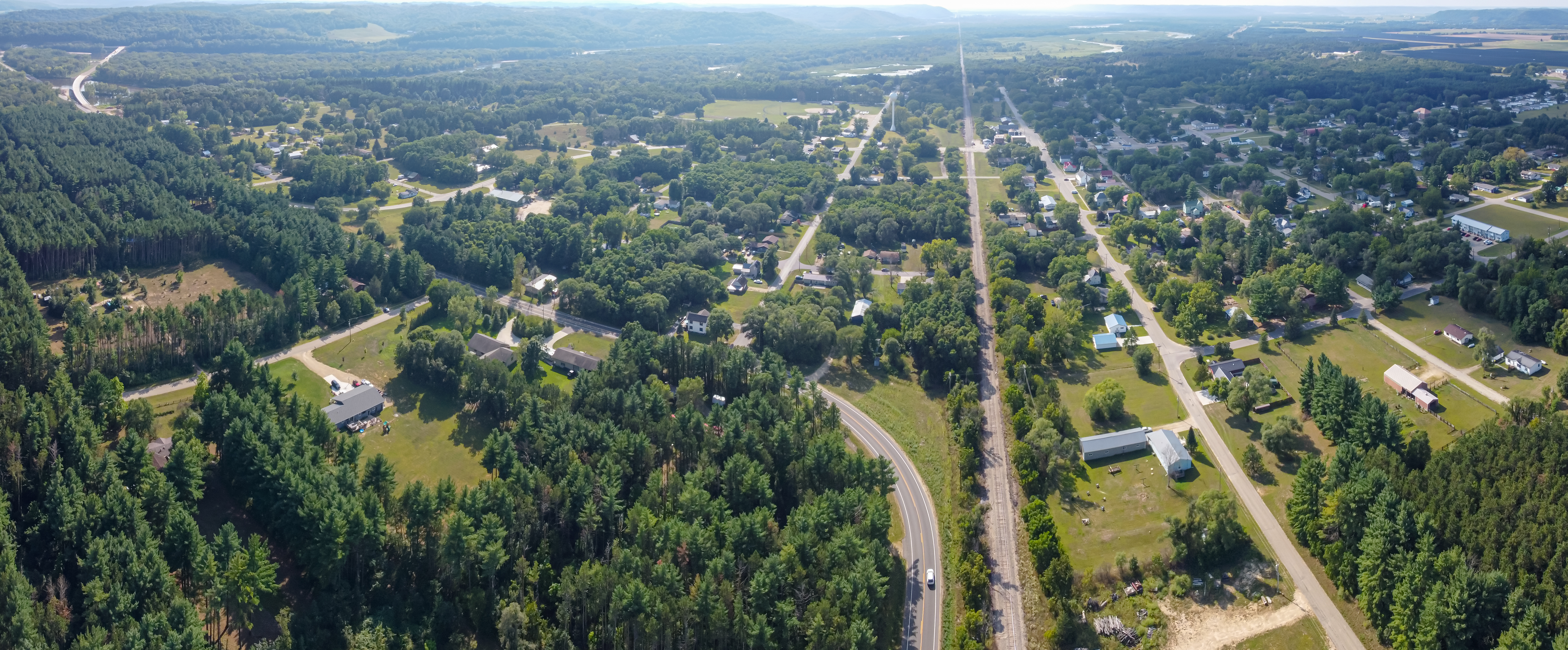

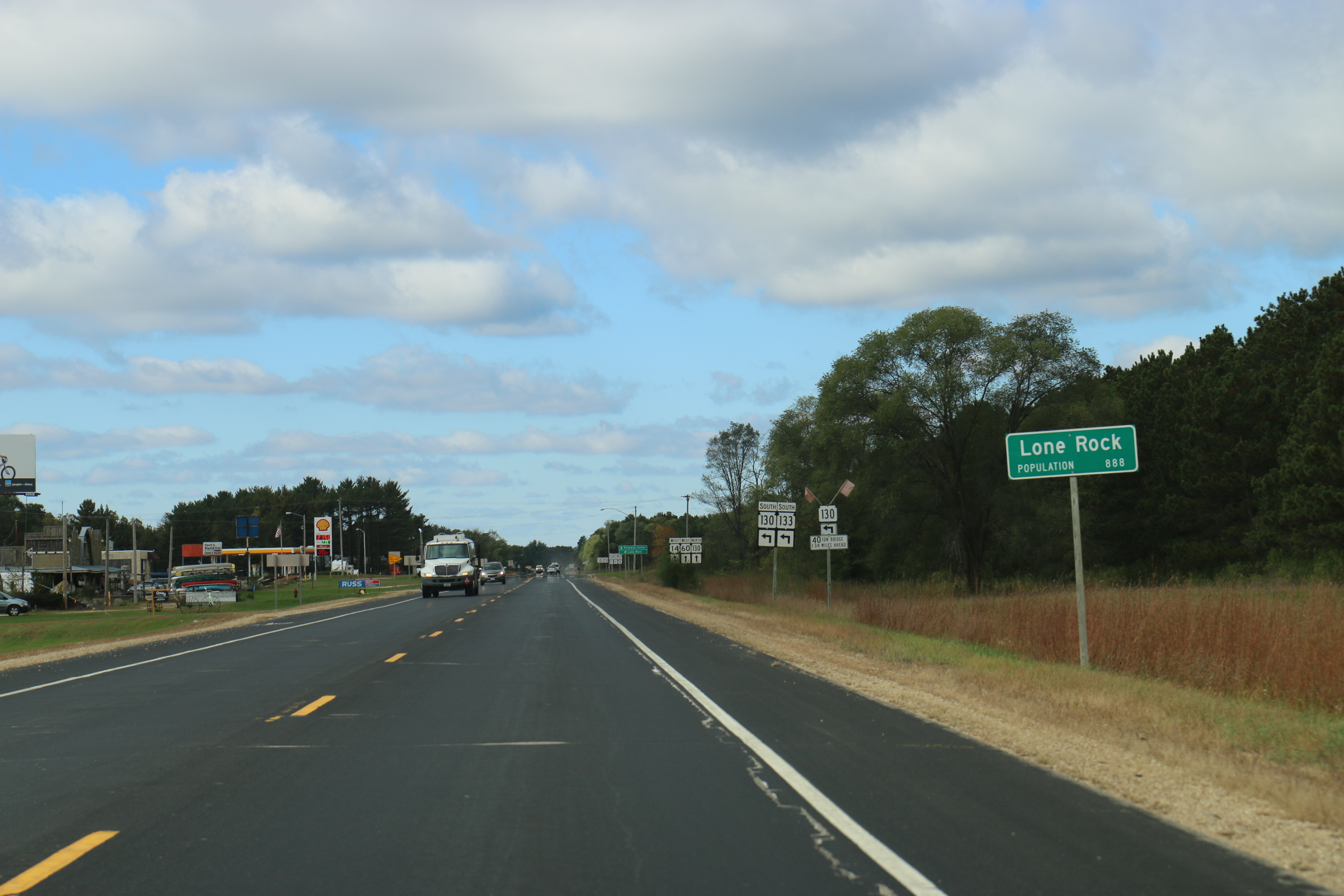
The sign for Lone Rock on US14/WIS60

Lone Rock is located at 43°11′3″N 90°11′54″W (43.184165, -90.198384).

According to the United States Census Bureau, the village has a total area of 1.11 square miles (2.87 km^{2}), all land.

The community is on the north side of the Wisconsin River on US Route 14 at the junction of State Highway 130.

== Climate ==
According to the Köppen Climate Classification system, Lone Rock has a hot-summer humid continental climate, abbreviated "Dfa" on climate maps. The hottest temperature recorded in Lone Rock was 102 °F (38.9 °C) on July 4–6, 2012, while the coldest temperature recorded was −53 °F (−47.2 °C) on January 30, 1951. Lone Rock held the record for the coldest temperature in Wisconsin until February 2, 1996, when Couderay recorded –55 °F (–48 °C).

Climate data for Lone Rock, Wisconsin (Tri-County Regional Airport), 1991–2020 normals, extremes 1948–present
Month	Jan	Feb	Mar	Apr	May	Jun	Jul	Aug	Sep	Oct	Nov	Dec	Year
Record high °F (°C)	59 (15)	73 (23)	82 (28)	97 (36)	97 (36)	99 (37)	102 (39)	101 (38)	100 (38)	94 (34)	78 (26)	69 (21)	102 (39)
Mean maximum °F (°C)	46.3 (7.9)	50.3 (10.2)	66.6 (19.2)	81.9 (27.7)	87.5 (30.8)	91.6 (33.1)	92.4 (33.6)	91.2 (32.9)	89.0 (31.7)	80.9 (27.2)	67.1 (19.5)	52.0 (11.1)	94.7 (34.8)
Mean daily maximum °F (°C)	27.5 (−2.5)	32.2 (0.1)	45.1 (7.3)	58.4 (14.7)	70.4 (21.3)	79.4 (26.3)	82.7 (28.2)	80.5 (26.9)	73.7 (23.2)	60.5 (15.8)	45.7 (7.6)	32.9 (0.5)	57.4 (14.1)
Daily mean °F (°C)	18.7 (−7.4)	23.0 (−5.0)	35.5 (1.9)	47.3 (8.5)	59.2 (15.1)	68.6 (20.3)	72.0 (22.2)	69.8 (21.0)	62.1 (16.7)	49.6 (9.8)	36.8 (2.7)	24.7 (−4.1)	47.3 (8.5)
Mean daily minimum °F (°C)	9.9 (−12.3)	13.8 (−10.1)	26.0 (−3.3)	36.2 (2.3)	47.9 (8.8)	57.8 (14.3)	61.3 (16.3)	59.2 (15.1)	50.6 (10.3)	38.8 (3.8)	27.8 (−2.3)	16.5 (−8.6)	37.2 (2.9)
Mean minimum °F (°C)	−16.8 (−27.1)	−12.3 (−24.6)	1.7 (−16.8)	20.9 (−6.2)	30.8 (−0.7)	45.0 (7.2)	51.2 (10.7)	47.8 (8.8)	35.8 (2.1)	22.5 (−5.3)	10.6 (−11.9)	−8.5 (−22.5)	−22.8 (−30.4)
Record low °F (°C)	−53 (−47)	−42 (−41)	−39 (−39)	−3 (−19)	21 (−6)	34 (1)	40 (4)	37 (3)	20 (−7)	8 (−13)	−18 (−28)	−36 (−38)	−53 (−47)
Average precipitation inches (mm)	0.88 (22)	0.87 (22)	1.88 (48)	3.69 (94)	3.72 (94)	5.28 (134)	4.54 (115)	4.17 (106)	3.42 (87)	2.48 (63)	1.95 (50)	1.20 (30)	34.08 (865)
Average precipitation days (≥ 0.01 in)	7.2	7.3	9.8	11.6	13.4	13.7	12.1	13.6	13.2	10.0	8.1	8.2	128.2
Source 1: NOAA
Source 2: National Weather Service

== Demographics ==
Historical population
Census	Pop.	Note	%±
1880	380		—
1890	342		−10.0%
1900	512		49.7%
1910	497		−2.9%
1920	453		−8.9%
1930	424		−6.4%
1940	502		18.4%
1950	570		13.5%
1960	563		−1.2%
1970	506		−10.1%
1980	577		14.0%
1990	641		11.1%
2000	929		44.9%
2010	888		−4.4%
2020	829		−6.6%
U.S. Decennial Census

=== 2010 census ===
As of the census of 2010, there were 888 people, 370 households, and 244 families living in the village. The population density was 800.0 inhabitants per square mile (308.9/km^{2}). There were 417 housing units at an average density of 375.7 per square mile (145.1/km^{2}). The racial makeup of the village was 96.8% White, 0.3% African American, 0.6% Native American, 0.5% Asian, 0.5% from other races, and 1.4% from two or more races. Hispanic or Latino of any race were 1.9% of the population.

There were 370 households, of which 33.0% had children under the age of 18 living with them, 42.4% were married couples living together, 15.9% had a female householder with no husband present, 7.6% had a male householder with no wife present, and 34.1% were non-families. 28.6% of all households were made up of individuals, and 10.8% had someone living alone who was 65 years of age or older. The average household size was 2.40 and the average family size was 2.87.

The median age in the village was 37 years. 26.4% of residents were under the age of 18; 9.4% were between the ages of 18 and 24; 25.3% were from 25 to 44; 25.2% were from 45 to 64; and 13.6% were 65 years of age or older. The gender makeup of the village was 52.4% male and 47.6% female.

=== 2000 census ===
As of the census of 2000, there were 929 people, 393 households, and 240 families living in the village. The population density was 790.2 people per square mile (304.0/km^{2}). There were 425 housing units at an average density of 361.5 per square mile (139.1/km^{2}). The racial makeup of the village was 98.17% White, 0.22% African American, 0.11% Native American, 0.11% Asian, 0.54% from other races, and 0.86% from two or more races. Hispanic or Latino of any race were 1.51% of the population.

There were 393 households, out of which 33.8% had children under the age of 18 living with them, 46.1% were married couples living together, 12.0% had a female householder with no husband present, and 38.7% were non-families. 30.3% of all households were made up of individuals, and 11.7% had someone living alone who was 65 years of age or older. The average household size was 2.36 and the average family size was 2.95.

In the village, the population was spread out, with 27.7% under the age of 18, 8.4% from 18 to 24, 33.0% from 25 to 44, 20.2% from 45 to 64, and 10.7% who were 65 years of age or older. The median age was 34 years. For every 100 females, there were 93.1 males. For every 100 females age 18 and over, there were 87.2 males.

The median income for a household in the village was $33,060, and the median income for a family was $37,750. Males had a median income of $29,844 versus $21,023 for females. The per capita income for the village was $15,985. About 4.1% of families and 5.4% of the population were below the poverty line, including 4.1% of those under age 18 and 7.5% of those age 65 or over.

== Education ==
Lone Rock is within the River Valley School District.

Lone Rock Elementary School closed in 2018.

== Transportation ==
Tri-County Regional Airport (KLNR) serves the city and surrounding communities.
