= Cornelius Williams (politician) =

American politician (1819–1891)

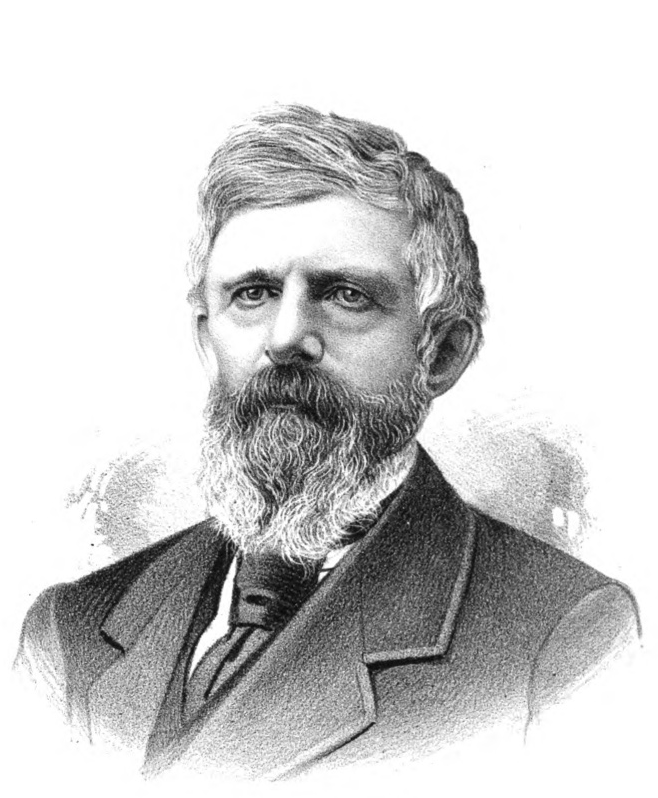
- From Portrait and Biographical Album of Racine and Kenosha Counties (1892)

Member of the Wisconsin State Assembly from the Kenosha district
- In office January 5, 1880 – January 3, 1881
- Preceded by: Joseph V. Quarles
- Succeeded by: Walter Maxwell

Personal details
- Born: September 16, 1819 Copake, New York, U.S.
- Died: March 27, 1891 (aged 71) Bristol, Kenosha County, Wisconsin, U.S.
- Resting place: Hosmer Cemetery, Bristol, Wisconsin
- Party: Republican
- Spouse: Catherine Trafford (died 1889)
- Children: Franklin Williams^{(b. 1844; died 1849)}; Esther Williams^{(b. 1847; died 1849)}; Etta (Hubbard)^{(b. 1850; died 1877)}; Clarence E. Williams^{(b. 1860; died 1929)}
- Occupation: Farmer, teacher

Cornelius Williams (September 16, 1819 – March 27, 1891) was an American farmer, politician, and Wisconsin pioneer. He was a member of the Wisconsin State Assembly, representing Kenosha County in the 1880 session.

== Biography ==
Cornelius Williams was born September 16, 1819, in Copake, New York. He was raised and educated on his father's farm and worked for several years as a teacher in Columbia County, New York.

In 1854, he traveled west to Kenosha County, Wisconsin, and purchased a tract of undeveloped land in the town of Bristol. He would cultivate this land into a farm and remain there for the rest of his life. By the time of his death, the farm had grown to 350 acres.

Williams was always a staunch Republican in politics. He served on the Bristol school board and the Kenosha County board of supervisors, and, in 1879, he was elected to the Wisconsin State Assembly on the Republican ticket. He served only one term, and his district comprised all of Kenosha County. He did not run for re-election in 1880.

He died at his home in Bristol on March 27, 1891.

== Personal life and family ==
The Williams family were of Welsh American descent. Cornelius Williams married Catherine Trafford, who was also a native of Columbia County, New York. They had four children together, but their first two children died in the 1846–1860 cholera pandemic. Only one child survived them, their son Clarence.

Clarence E. Williams also went on to serve on the Kenosha County board of supervisors and the Bristol school board.

== Electoral history ==
=== Wisconsin Assembly (1879) ===
Wisconsin Assembly, Kenosha District Election, 1879
Party	Candidate	Votes	%	±%
General Election, November 4, 1879
Republican	Cornelius Williams	1,271	59.42%	+3.04%
Democratic	John Tuttle	868	40.58%	−0.55%
Plurality		403	18.84%	+3.59%
Total votes		2,139	100.0%	-15.49%
Republican hold				

Wisconsin State Assembly
Preceded by Joseph V. Quarles	Member of the Wisconsin State Assembly from the Kenosha district January 5, 1880 – January 3, 1881	Succeeded by Walter Maxwell
