= Tri-County Regional Airport =

- IATA: LNR; ICAO: KLNR; FAA LID: LNR

Summary
- Airport type: Public
- Owner: Sauk, Iowa & Richland Counties
- Serves: Lone Rock, Wisconsin
- Opened: November 1943
- Time zone: CST (UTC−06:00)
  - Summer (DST): CDT (UTC−05:00)
- Elevation AMSL: 717 ft (219 m)
- Coordinates: 43°12′43″N 090°10′47″W

Map
- Location of airport in Wisconsin LNR (the United States)

Runways
Direction	Length		Surface
Direction	ft	m	Surface
9/27	5,000	1,524	Asphalt
18/36	1,850	564	Asphalt

Statistics
- Aircraft operations (2022): 16,000
- Based aircraft (2024): 27
- Source: Federal Aviation Administration

Tri-County Regional Airport (IATA: LNR, ICAO: KLNR, FAA LID: LNR) is a public use airport in the Town of Spring Green, Sauk County, Wisconsin, United States. It is located 2 nautical miles (3.7 km) north of the central business district of Lone Rock, a village in Richland County. The airport is owned by the Wisconsin counties of Sauk, Iowa and Richland. It is included in the Federal Aviation Administration (FAA) National Plan of Integrated Airport Systems for 2025–2029, in which it is categorized as a local general aviation facility.

== Facilities and aircraft ==
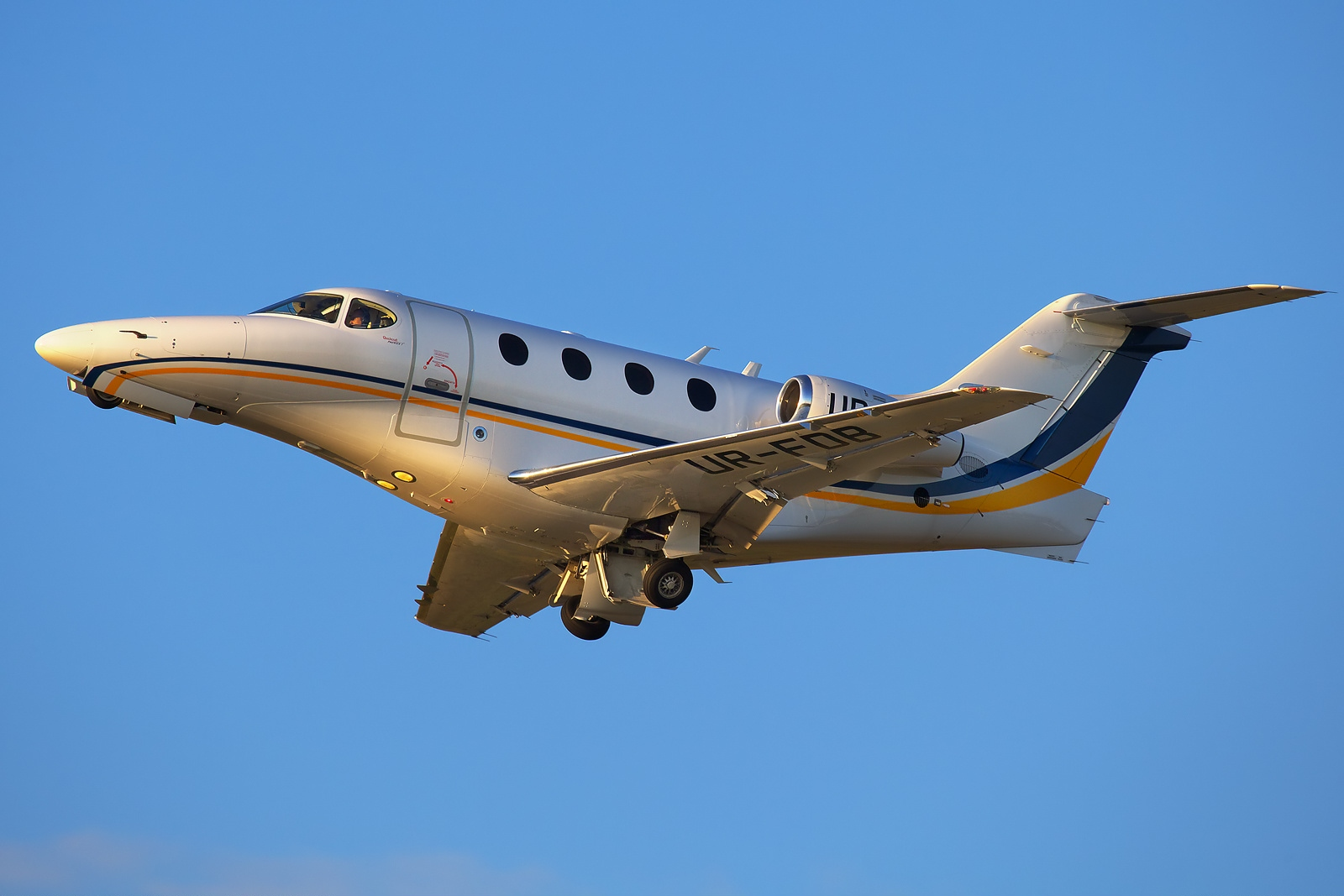
Premier IA climbing

Tri-County Regional Airport covers an area of 225 acres (91 ha) at an elevation of 717 feet (219 m) above mean sea level. It has two runways with asphalt surfaces: 9/27 is 5,000 by 75 feet (1,524 x 23 m) and 18/36 is 1,850 by 60 feet (564 x 18 m).

For the 12-month period ending September 26, 2022, the airport had 16,000 aircraft operations, an average of 44 per day: 96% general aviation, 3% air taxi and 1% military. In July 2024, there were 27 aircraft based at this airport: 26 single-engine and 1 jet.

== See also ==
- List of airports in Wisconsin
