= Oil City, Wisconsin =

- Unincorporated community
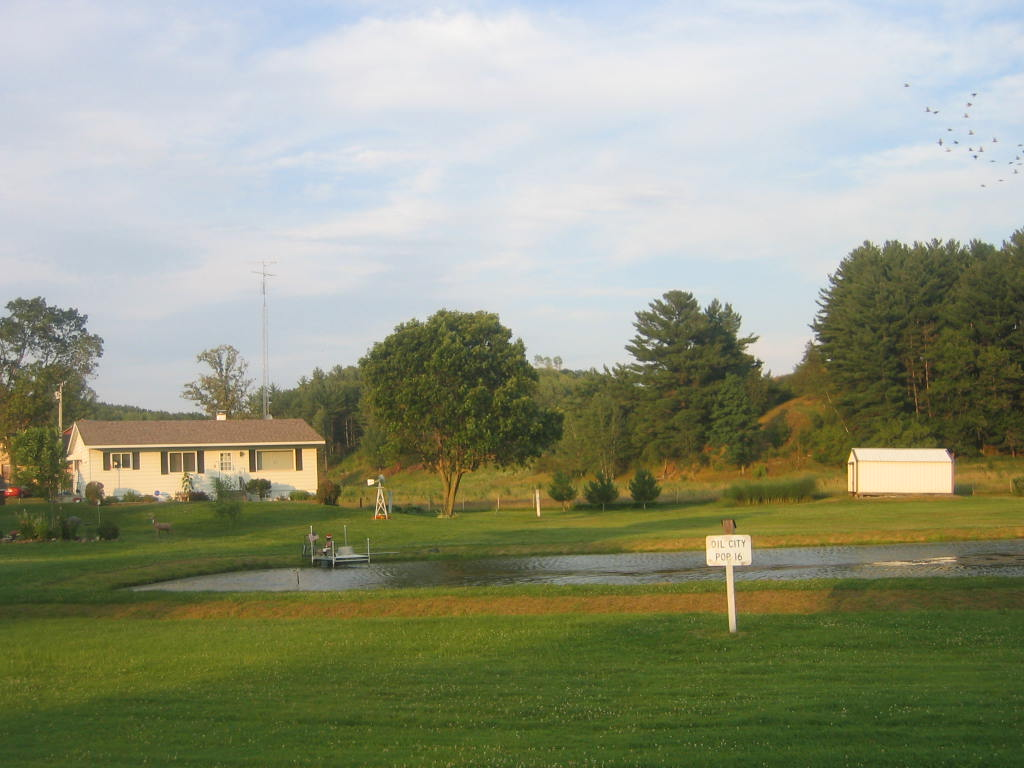
- Oil City today

- Location within Wisconsin Location within the United States
- Coordinates: 43°45′02″N 90°35′12″W
- Country: United States
- State: Wisconsin
- County: Monroe
- Elevation: 886 ft (270 m)
- Time zone: UTC-6 (Central (CST))
  - Summer (DST): UTC-5 (CDT)
- Area code: 608
- GNIS feature ID: 1570758

Oil City is an unincorporated community in the Town of Sheldon in Monroe County, Wisconsin, United States. It was the site of a nineteenth-century oil swindle and is located approximately halfway between Wilton and Ontario on WI-131.

A cemetery in the area, known either as the Sheldon Township Cemetery or the Oil City Cemetery, was used from the 1860s to the early 1900s. It was plowed over by a local farmer in the 1940s; while the cemetery has since been restored, many of the original headstones are now gone.
