= Levi Wallace (politician) =

American politician (1839–1917)

Levi Wallace (October 20, 1839 – February 5, 1917) was a member of the Wisconsin State Assembly.

== Biography ==
Wallace was born on October 20, 1839, in Muskingum County, Ohio. After residing for a time in Vernon County, Wisconsin, he purchased a farm in Sheldon, Monroe County, Wisconsin in 1879.

He married twice. First, to Harriet Dalton in 1866. They would have four children before her death in 1880. Later, Wallace married Civilia Jane Appleman and they would have six children. He died on February 5, 1917.

== Political career ==
Wallace was a member of the Assembly in 1885. Other positions he held include Chairman (similar to Mayor) and member of the town board (similar to city council) of Sheldon and member of the county board of Monroe County, Wisconsin. He was a Republican.
