= Andrew Patterson (Wisconsin politician) =

American politician (1831–1893)

Member of the Wisconsin State Assembly from the Kenosha district
- In office January 5, 1885 – January 3, 1887
- Preceded by: Walter Maxwell
- Succeeded by: John G. Fleming

Personal details
- Born: December 15, 1831 Rathmullan, County Donegal, Ireland
- Died: October 24, 1893 (aged 61) Burlington, Wisconsin, U.S.
- Cause of death: Cholera
- Resting place: Burlington Cemetery, Burlington, Wisconsin
- Party: Republican
- Spouse: Anna Wilson (m. 1857–1893)
- Children: George W. Patterson^{(b. 1857; died 1940)}; Jane Ellen (Voak)^{(b. 1859; died 1948)}; Sarah A. Patterson^{(died after 1893)}; Ida M. (Stewart)^{(died after 1893)}; Emma E. Patterson^{(b. 1867; died 1947)}; Mary Etta Patterson^{(b. 1869; died 1893)}; Minnie Lorette Patterson^{(b. 1872; died 1959)}; Florence Marguerite Patterson^{(b. 1874; died 1962)}; Fred Russell Patterson^{(b. 1874; died 1963)}
- Occupation: Farmer

Andrew Patterson (December 15, 1831 – October 24, 1893) was an Irish American immigrant, farmer, and Wisconsin pioneer. He was a member of the Wisconsin State Assembly, representing Kenosha County in the 1885 session.

== Biography ==
Andrew Patterson was born in County Donegal, Ireland, in December 1831. He received a common education in Ireland until age 13. At that time, in 1841, he emigrated with his parents and his many siblings to the United States. They settled first in the town of Brighton, in what is now Kenosha County, Wisconsin. He worked as a farmhand in Brighton and then in the town of Wheatland, before purchasing his own farm in Salem.

By 1879, he had a successful and productive farm of 316 acres, raising grain and maintaining a herd of sheep. He served as chairman of the town board of supervisors in 1873, and, in 1884, he was elected to the Wisconsin State Assembly, running on the Republican Party ticket. He represented Kenosha in the 37th Wisconsin Legislature, and served on the committee on assessment and collection of taxes.

In 1892, he and his wife took a trip to Europe with their daughter Sarah, visiting England, Scotland, and Ireland. During the trip, he visited the home he grew up in, in County Donegal. Around this same time, he moved his primary residence to the city of Burlington, Wisconsin.

Andrew Patterson died of acute Cholera in October 1893, at his home in Burlington. He and his wife visited the World's Columbian Exposition in Chicago just days before his death.

== Personal life and family ==
Andrew Patterson married Anna Wilson at Wheatland, on May 22, 1857. Anna Wilson was born in Burlington, Wisconsin, the daughter of Scottish American immigrants. Two of Anna's brothers died in the American Civil War. Andrew and Anna Patterson had at least nine children together. His wife and all nine children survived him, though his daughter Mary died just a few weeks later, possibly suffering from the same disease.

Wisconsin State Assembly
Preceded by Walter Maxwell	Member of the Wisconsin State Assembly from the Kenosha district January 5, 1885 – January 3, 1887	Succeeded by John G. Fleming
