= Charles Palmetier =

American businessman and politician

Charles Palmetier (December 29, 1834 - ?) was an American businessman and politician.

Born in the town of Catskill, New York, Palmetier moved to Wisconsin Territory in 1847 and settled in Geneva, Wisconsin in 1861. Palmetier was a lumber dealer. He served in the 8th Wisconsin Volunteer Infantry Regiment during the American Civil War. Palmetier served in local government: town board, school board, etc. He served in the Wisconsin State Senate as a Republican in 1882 and 1883.
