= Philip Bouffleur =

American politician (1829–1912)

Philip Bouffleur was a member of the Wisconsin State Assembly.

== Biography ==
A native of Prussia, Bouffleur was born on September 7, 1829. From 1849 to 1851, he served with the Prussian Army. Pursuits he followed afterwards include shoemaking.

On November 27, 1855, Bouffleur married Mary Reinlinder. They would have eight children. Bouffleur was affiliated with the Methodist Episcopal Church. He died on November 24, 1912.

== Political career ==
Bouffleur was a member of the Assembly during the 1885 session. Previously, he had been Postmaster of Springville, Vernon County, Wisconsin from 1864 to 1883. He was a Republican.
