= Frederick C. Schuler =

American politician

Frederick C. Schuler (born March 8, 1844) was a member of the Wisconsin State Assembly during the 1885, 1887 and 1889 sessions. He was a Democrat.
