= Carl R. Feld =

American politician (1858–1914)

Carl R. Feld was a member of the Wisconsin State Assembly.

== Biography ==
Born on December 14, 1858, Feld graduated from what is now Northwestern University Pritzker School of Law. He died in 1914.

== Career ==
Feld was elected to the Assembly in 1885, 1886 and 1888. He was a Democrat.
