= Whitefish Bay, Wisconsin =

Village in Milwaukee County, Wisconsin

- Village
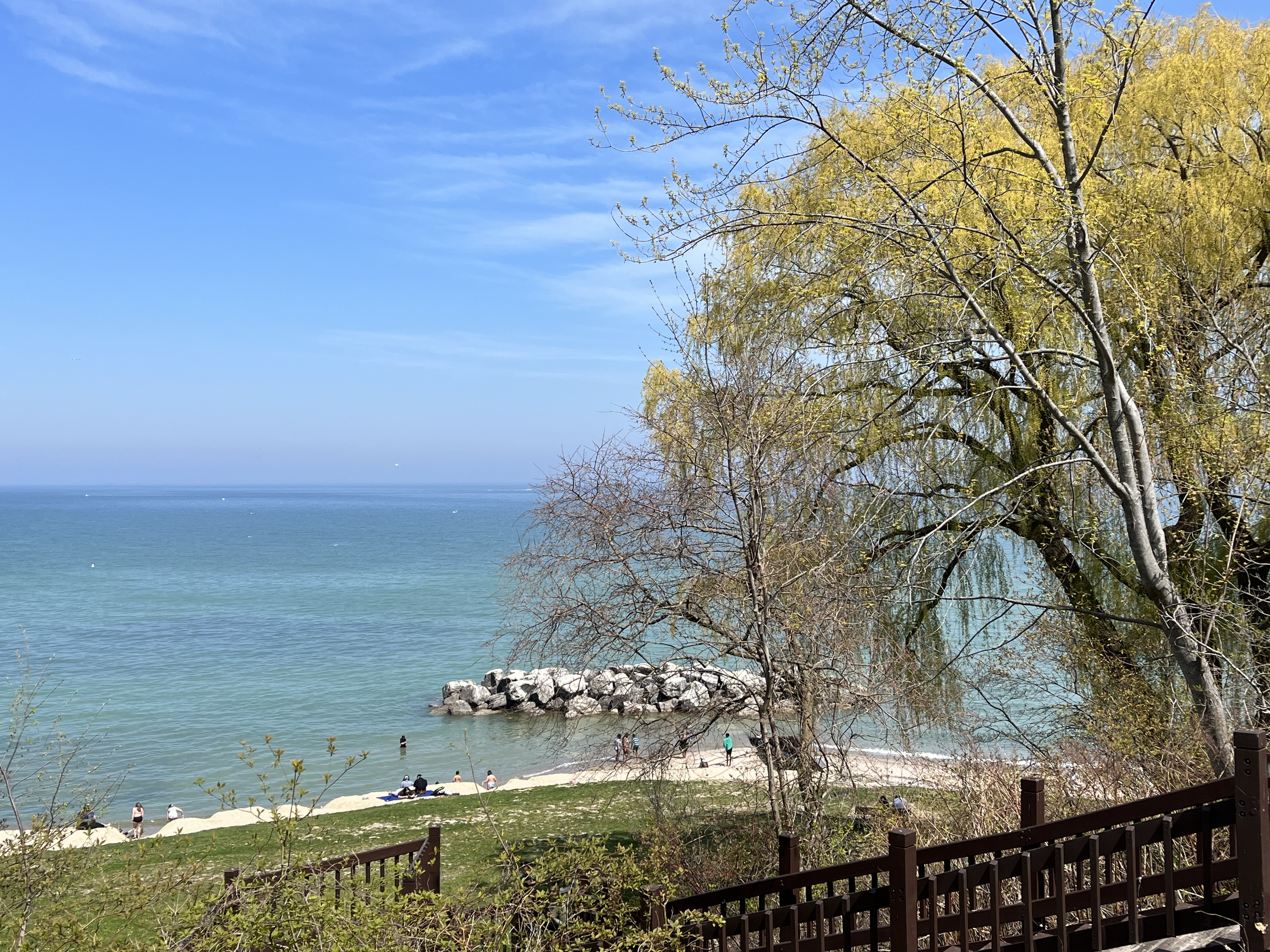
- Lake Michigan shore in Whitefish Bay

- Location of Whitefish Bay in Milwaukee County, Wisconsin.
- Coordinates: 43°6′42″N 87°54′3″W
- Country: United States
- State: Wisconsin
- County: Milwaukee

Area
  - Total: 2.12 sq mi (5.48 km^{2})
  - Land: 2.12 sq mi (5.48 km^{2})
  - Water: 0 sq mi (0.00 km^{2})
- Elevation: 650 ft (198 m)

Population (2020)
  - Total: 14,954
  - Density: 7,070/sq mi (2,728/km^{2})
- Time zone: UTC-6 (Central (CST))
  - Summer (DST): UTC-5 (CDT)
- Area code: 414
- FIPS code: 55-86700
- GNIS feature ID: 1576675
- Website: www.wfbvillage.gov

Whitefish Bay is a village in Milwaukee County, Wisconsin, United States. The population was 14,954 at the 2020 census. A suburb north of Milwaukee along the shore of Lake Michigan, it is part of the Milwaukee metropolitan area.

== History ==
In the early 19th century when the first white settlers arrived, the Whitefish Bay area was controlled by Native Americans, including the Menominee, Potawatomi, and Sauk people. The area came under the control of the United States Federal Government in 1832 when the Menominee surrendered their claims to the land by signing the Treaty of Washington. The land was organized as part of the Town of Milwaukee in 1835, and for much of the 19th century, the community's main economic activities were farming and fishing. Many of the early settlers were German immigrants.

In 1889, Pabst Brewing Company owner Frederick Pabst purchased land in the Whitefish Bay area which he developed into the Pabst Whitefish Bay Resort, which included a hotel, restaurant, beer garden, and bandshell. He later added a Ferris wheel and a carousel, as well. At its height, the park hosted as many as 15,000 visitors each weekend, and was once visited by President Theodore Roosevelt. Some leisure seekers travelled to the park from Milwaukee via steam boats that docked at Whitefish Bay's lakeshore; others took the Milwaukee & Whitefish Bay Railroad, a steam-powered tram that began running to Whitefish Bay in 1886 and was replaced by the electric streetcars of the Milwaukee Electric Railway and Light Company in 1898.

In the early 1890s, the area's residents lobbied the Town of Milwaukee for a local school; the nearest school was seven miles from Whitefish Bay. The town did not acquiesce to the residents' demands, and in 1892, the local residents responded by incorporating as the Village of Whitefish Bay and forming a school district independent of the Town of Milwaukee. At the time, it was the first village in Milwaukee County.

In the early 20th century, the village developed as a streetcar suburb, with the population growing from 512 in 1900 to 9651 in 1940. As the population grew, real estate developers constructed new residential subdivisions. Even though the Pabst Whitefish Bay Resort closed in 1914, the lakeshore land it occupied was redeveloped into seventeen lakefront residential lots, including the National Register of Historic Places-listed Herman Uihlein Mansion, constructed between 1917 and 1919 for one of the sons of the president of the Joseph Schlitz Brewing Company. In the first decades of the 1900s, eastern Whitefish Bay became part of the "gold coast" area that developed along the lakeshore north of Milwaukee and attracted some of the city's most affluent families.

Whitefish Bay continued to grow during the suburbanization that followed World War II, reaching a peak population of 18,390 in 1960, before the population began to slowly decline, stabilizing at approximately 14,000 at the turn of the 21st century.

== Geography ==
Whitefish Bay is located at 43°6′42″N 87°54′3″W (43.111711, −87.900762). According to the United States Census Bureau, the village has a total area of 2.13 square miles (5.52 km^{2}), all land.

== Demographics ==
Historical population
Census	Pop.	Note	%±
1900	512		—
1910	542		5.9%
1920	882		62.7%
1930	5,362		507.9%
1940	9,651		80.0%
1950	14,665		52.0%
1960	18,390		25.4%
1970	17,402		−5.4%
1980	14,930		−14.2%
1990	14,272		−4.4%
2000	14,163		−0.8%
2010	14,110		−0.4%
2020	14,954		6.0%
U.S. Decennial Census

=== 2020 census ===
As of the 2020 census, Whitefish Bay had a population of 14,954. The median age was 38.9 years. 29.5% of residents were under the age of 18 and 13.8% of residents were 65 years of age or older. For every 100 females there were 95.5 males, and for every 100 females age 18 and over there were 90.8 males age 18 and over.

100.0% of residents lived in urban areas, while 0.0% lived in rural areas.

There were 5,413 households in Whitefish Bay, of which 44.3% had children under the age of 18 living in them. Of all households, 66.8% were married-couple households, 9.3% were households with a male householder and no spouse or partner present, and 19.7% were households with a female householder and no spouse or partner present. About 18.4% of all households were made up of individuals and 8.8% had someone living alone who was 65 years of age or older.

There were 5,640 housing units, of which 4.0% were vacant. The homeowner vacancy rate was 0.7% and the rental vacancy rate was 5.2%.

Racial composition as of the 2020 census
Race	Number	Percent
White	12,654	84.6%
Black or African American	418	2.8%
American Indian and Alaska Native	21	0.1%
Asian	725	4.8%
Native Hawaiian and Other Pacific Islander	8	0.1%
Some other race	151	1.0%
Two or more races	977	6.5%
Hispanic or Latino (of any race)	640	4.3%

=== 2010 census ===
As of the census of 2010, there were 14,110 people, 5,355 households, and 3,944 families residing in the village. The population density was 6,624.4 inhabitants per square mile (2,557.7/km^{2}). There were 5,553 housing units at an average density of 2,607.0 per square mile (1,006.6/km^{2}). The racial makeup of the village was 91.9% White, 1.9% African American, 0.1% Native American, 3.7% Asian, 0.5% from other races, and 1.9% from two or more races. Hispanic or Latino of any race were 2.8% of the population.

There were 5,355 households, of which 40.8% had children under the age of 18 living with them, 64.1% were married couples living together, 7.3% had a female householder with no husband present, 2.3% had a male householder with no wife present, and 26.3% were non-families. 21.8% of all households were made up of individuals, and 8% had someone living alone who was 65 years of age or older. The average household size was 2.63 and the average family size was 3.13.

The median age in the village was 39.6 years. 29.6% of residents were under the age of 18; 4.6% were between the ages of 18 and 24; 24.8% were from 25 to 44; 30.6% were from 45 to 64; and 10.6% were 65 years of age or older. The gender makeup of the village was 48.1% male and 51.9% female.

== Education ==
The Whitefish Bay School District, which covers all of the municipality, maintains four public schools and one recreational facility. These facilities include:

- Whitefish Bay High School – a high school serving children in grades 9–12. In 2024, it was ranked #1 in Milwaukee, #1 in Wisconsin and #164 nationally by U.S. News & World Report Rankings.
- Whitefish Bay Middle School – a middle school/junior high school serving children in grades 6–8.
- Cumberland Elementary School – an elementary school serving children age-4 kindergarten through grade 5.
- Richards Elementary School – an elementary school serving children age-4 kindergarten through grade 5.
- Lydell School – a community recreation facility.

The Archdiocese of Milwaukee maintains two Catholic schools in Whitefish Bay: Holy Family School and St. Monica School, each serving kindergarten through grade 8. In addition, the Sinsinawa Dominican Sisters sponsor Dominican High School.

At the north end of the village are two Jewish grade schools: Milwaukee Jewish Day School and Hillel Academy, sharing the Max and Mary Kohl Education building.

== Notable people ==
- Kostas Antetokounmpo, NBA player
- Nick Bellore, NFL player
- Jeff Bridich, MLB executive
- Art Bues, MLB player
- Evan Conway, soccer player
- Richard W. Conway, Professor Emeritus, Cornell University
- Craig Counsell, MLB player and manager
- Brad Courtney, chairman of the Republican Party of Wisconsin
- Rebecca Dallet, Wisconsin Supreme Court Justice
- Randy Dean, NFL quarterback, Olympic handball player and Director of the Petit National Ice Center
- Colleen Dewhurst, actress
- Bernardine Dohrn, former Weather Underground leader & retired law professor
- Tommy and Matthew End, of the YouTube channel That's Amazing
- Jay Guidinger, NBA player
- Julius P. Heil, Governor of Wisconsin
- Ed Hochuli, NFL referee
- Jeffrey Hunter, Hollywood film actor
- Frederick Isenring, Wisconsin State Representative
- Kristen Johnston, actress
- Jack Larscheid, professional football player
- Pat McCurdy, singer/songwriter
- Niels Mueller, director/writer (film)
- Barbara Notestein, Wisconsin State Representative
- Caitlin O'Heaney, actress
- Samuel Page, actor
- Marcus Raskin, co-founder of the Institute for Policy Studies, father of Jamie Raskin
- Michael Salomon, music video/film director
- Mike Schneck, NFL player
- Donald K. Stitt, chairman of the Republican Party of Wisconsin
- Diamond Stone, NBA player
- Paul Michael Valley, actor
- Dan Vebber, writer/producer (TV)
- Chip Zien, actor
