= Thomas Hill (politician, born 1846) =

American politician

Thomas Hill (October 16, 1846 - January 1, 1937) was an American farmer and livestock dealer from Spring Green who served a single two-year term as a Republican member of the Wisconsin State Assembly from Sauk County.

Hill was born in Lancashire, England, on October 16, 1846. He was elected to the assembly in 1888, with 1,925 votes against 1,266 votes for Democrat Lawrence Watson, and 312 votes for E. 0. Stone, Prohibition Party candidate.
