= 6th Independent Battery Wisconsin Light Artillery =

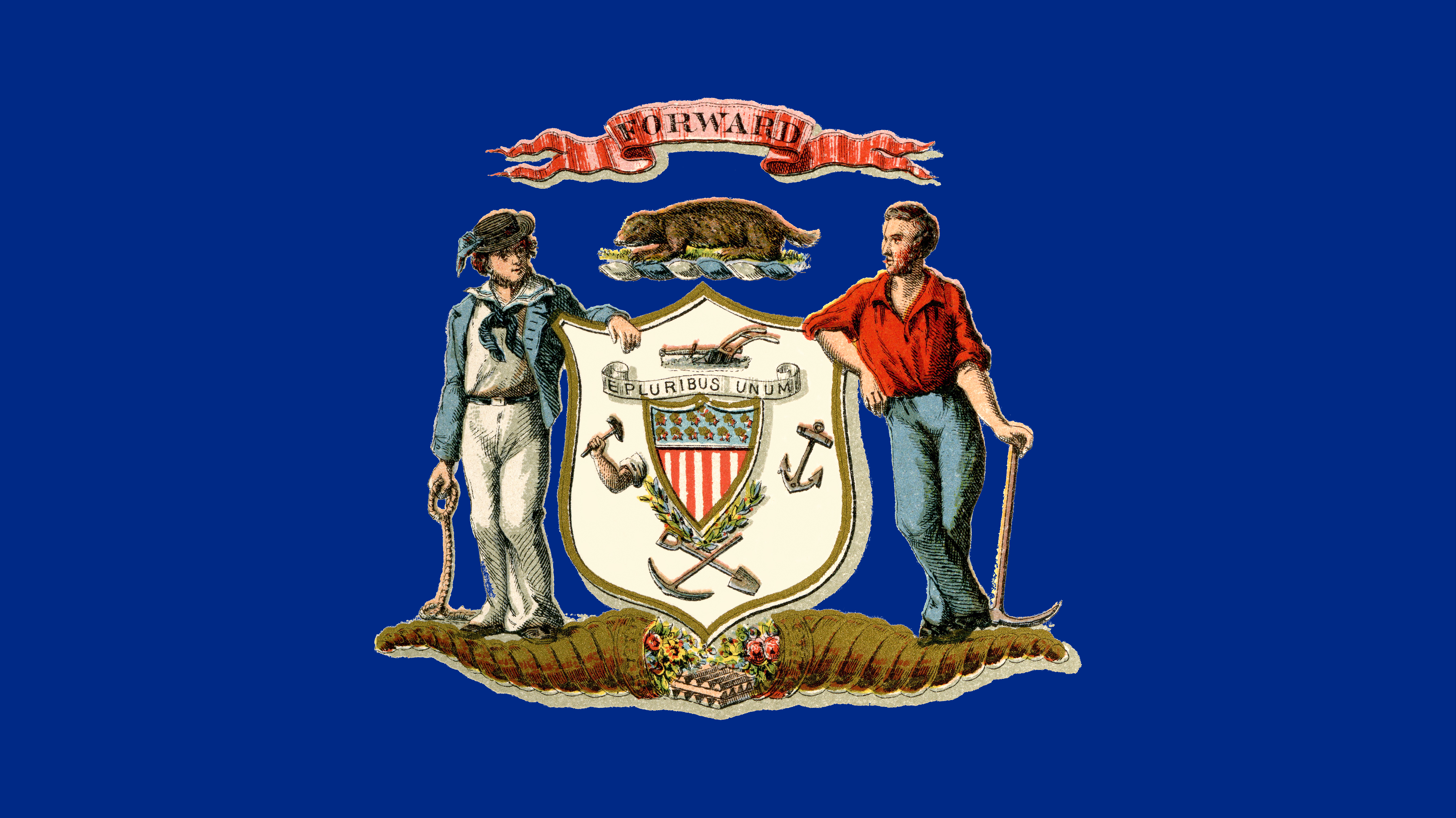
- Active: October 2, 1861, to July 3, 1865
- Country: United States
- Allegiance: Union
- Branch: Artillery
- Engagements: Siege of Corinth; Battle of Corinth; Battle of Port Gibson; Battle of Champion Hill; Siege of Vicksburg; Siege of Chattanooga; Battle of Nashville

The 6th Independent Battery Wisconsin Light Artillery, nicknamed the "Buena Vista Artillery," was an artillery battery that served in the Union Army during the American Civil War.

== Service ==
The 6th Independent Battery was mustered into service at Racine, Wisconsin, on October 2, 1861.

The battery was mustered out on July 3, 1865, at Madison, Wisconsin.

== Total strength and casualties ==
The 6th Independent Battery initially recruited 157 officers and men. An additional 85 men were recruited as replacements, for a total of 242 men.

The battery suffered 1 officer and 6 enlisted men killed in action or died of wounds and 22 enlisted men who died of disease, for a total of 29 fatalities.

== Commanders ==
- Captain Henry Dillon
- Captain Thomas R. Hood

== See also ==
- List of Wisconsin Civil War units
- Wisconsin in the American Civil War
