= Charles Elkert =

American politician

Charles Elkert was a Prussian-born American politician. He was a member of the Wisconsin State Assembly.

== Biography ==
Elkert was born on December 8, 1849, in Prussia. He emigrated to Milwaukee, Wisconsin, in 1851 and became a tanner.

== Political career ==
Elkert was a member of the Assembly during the 1885 and 1889 sessions. Additionally, he was a member of the county board of supervisors of Milwaukee County, Wisconsin, and a Milwaukee alderman. He was a Republican.
