= Ferdinand Schulze =

American politician (1840–1907)

Ferdinand Schulze (July 20, 1840 – December 6, 1907) was a member of the Wisconsin State Assembly.

== Biography ==
A native of Prussia, Schulze moved with his family to Columbia County, Wisconsin in 1850. After working as a miner in Virginia City, Nevada, he settled in Portage, Wisconsin and became a merchant of dry goods. A Lutheran, Schulze married Minnie A. Dent (1854–1926) on March 2, 1880 in Milwaukee, Wisconsin. They had four children. Schulze was a member of the Assembly in 1885. He was a Republican. Schulze died of a stroke at his home in Portage in 1907. He was buried at Silver Lake Cemetery in Portage.
