= William F. Cirkel =

American politician

William Frederick Cirkel (November 14, 1857 – May 17, 1893) was an American politician and businessman.

Cirkel was born in Appleton, Wisconsin. He went to Lawrence University. Cirkel owned a stave factory in Seymour, Wisconsin and served as mayor from 1882 to 1884. In 1885 and 1886, Cirkel served in the Wisconsin Assembly as a Democrat. In 1887, Cirkel moved to Cadott, Wisconsin where he established a stave factory. Cirkel died at his home from coal gas that was leaking in his room.
