= James Lemont =

American politician

James Lemont was a member of the Wisconsin State Assembly during the 1885 session, representing the 12th District of Milwaukee County, Wisconsin. He was a Republican. Lemont was born near what was then Bangor, Ireland on December 10, 1843.
