= Bottle flipping =

2016 trend popularized online

Flipping a water bottle

Bottle flipping is the act of throwing a plastic bottle, typically partially full of liquid, into the air so that it rotates in an attempt to land it upright on its base or cap. It became an international trend in the summer of 2016, with numerous videos of people attempting the activity being posted online. With its popularity, the repetitive thuds of multiple attempts have been criticized as a distraction and a public nuisance. Parents and teachers have expressed frustration at the practice, resulting in water bottle flipping being banned at several schools worldwide and many people calling for the practice only to be performed in private.

== History ==
The concept of bottle flipping was seen in a stunt on the game show Minute to Win It in 2010.

In 2016, a viral video of teenager Mike Senatore flipping a water bottle at a talent show at Ardrey Kell High School in Charlotte, North Carolina popularized the activity.

== Description ==
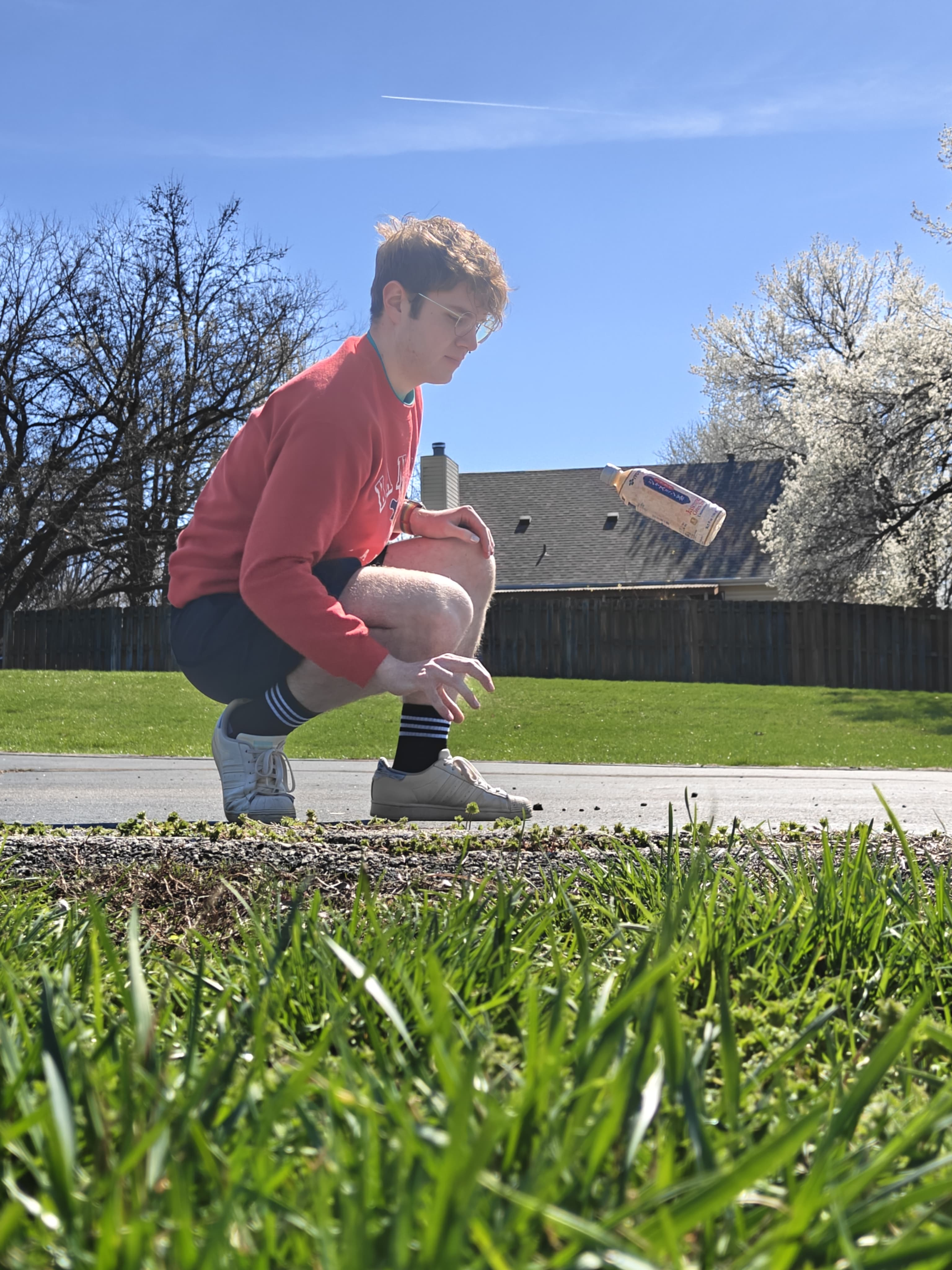
Mid bottle flip

Water bottle flipping involves taking a plastic water bottle that is partially empty and holding it by the neck of the bottle. Force is applied with a flicking of wrist, with the bottom of the bottle rotating away from the person. If performed successfully, the bottle will land upright. Alternatively, the bottle may land upside-down or on its cap. Doing this is significantly more difficult than flipping a bottle so it lands upright. The amount of fluid in the bottle greatly influences the success of the feat, and it has been shown empirically that filling the bottle about one-third of the way improves the rate of success. The type of water bottle also plays a role; for instance, the brand Deer Park Spring Water has been noted to make the task easier due to its unique hourglass shape with a third divot.

The feat is often performed with disposable plastic water bottles due to their availability. Still, other containers can be used as well. The bottle flip is often combined with the dab after a successful flip as a part of the trend. The complex physics behind the activity incorporates concepts of fluid dynamics, projectile motion, angular momentum, centripetal force, and gravity. In 2018, a group of students and professors from the Netherlands developed a minimal model of the water bottle flip involving conservation of angular momentum and, most importantly, the redistribution of mass along the bottle. The model estimates that the best-filling fractions for water flipping lie in the range between 20% and 40%.

Multiple mobile apps have been created to recreate the activity; the app "Bottle Flip 2k16" was downloaded 3 million times in the first month of its release.

== See also ==
- List of viral videos
- Internet meme
- Viral phenomenon
