= Frederick G. Isenring =

American politician

- Born: April 1, 1854; Milwaukee County, Wisconsin, U.S.
- Died: Unknown
- Occupations: Politician, businessman
- Known for: Mysterious disappearance

Frederick G. Isenring (April 1, 1854 – Unknown) was an American politician and businessman.

== Biography ==
Born in Milwaukee County, Wisconsin, Isenring went to a business college. He served in the Wisconsin Militia and was commissioned captain. He was a hotel owner and was in the real estate and insurance business. In 1885, Isenring served in the Wisconsin State Assembly and was a Republican. His wife died in 1894. From 1892 to 1895, Isenring served as the first president of the village of Whitefish Bay, Wisconsin. He also served on the Milwaukee County Board of Supervisors. In 1897 and 1898, Isenring served as sheriff of Milwaukee County. During that time $20,000 from the sheriff's sale was not accounted for and was missing. He was ordered to appear in court and did not do so. Eventually, an arrest warrant was issued around Christmas 1899. Isenring was supposed to do business in Fond du Lac, Wisconsin, but was never seen again.

== See also ==
- List of people who disappeared mysteriously (pre-1910)
