= Gottfried Inden =

American politician

Gottfried Inden (June 1, 1827 – August 1, 1896) was an American politician.

Born in Prussia, Inden settled in Granville, Wisconsin and managed a hotel. He served as Granville town clerk and supervisor. In 1885, Inden served in the Wisconsin State Assembly and was a Democrat.
