= Winfield, Wisconsin =

Town of Winfield, Wisconsin
- Town
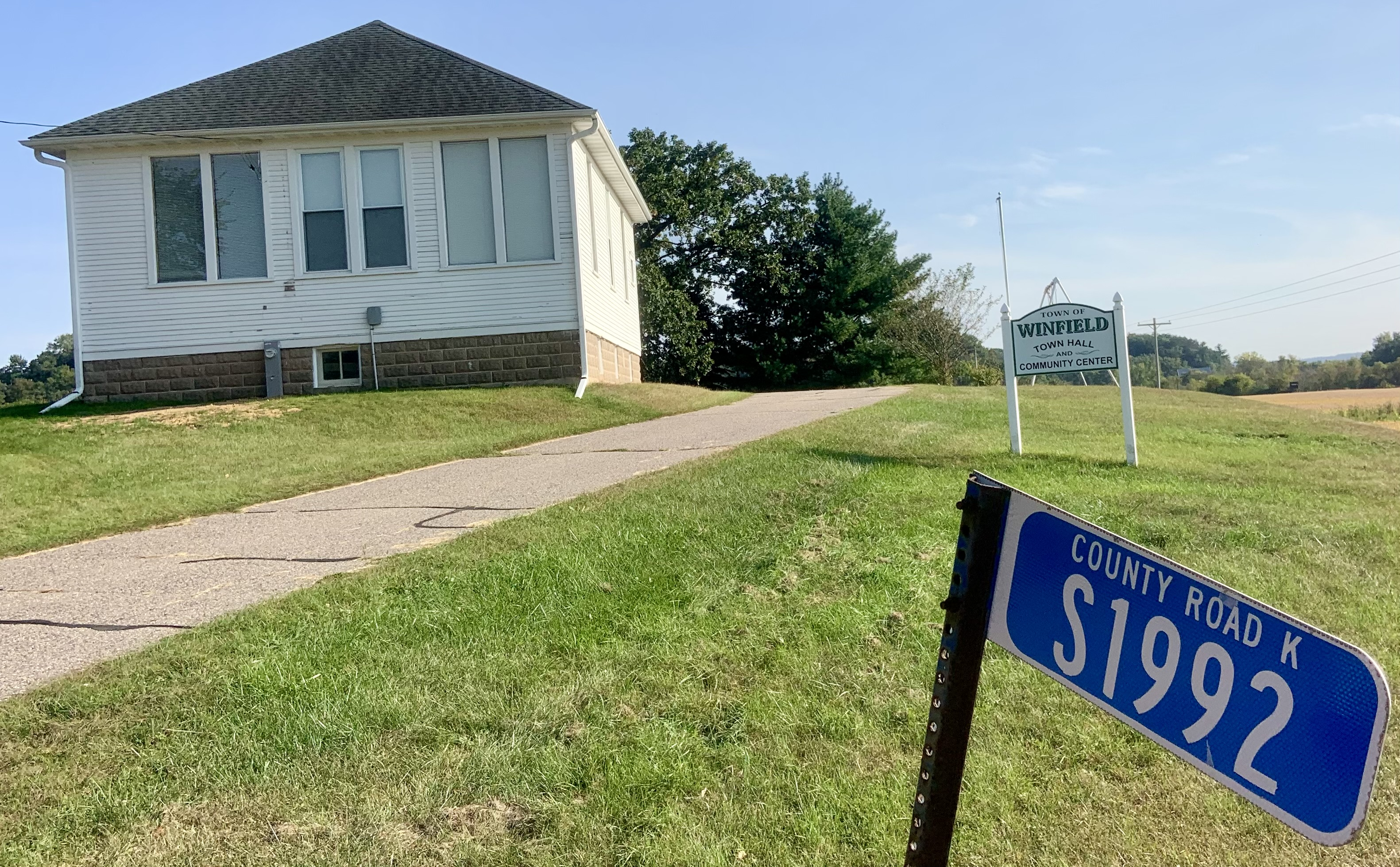
- Town hall

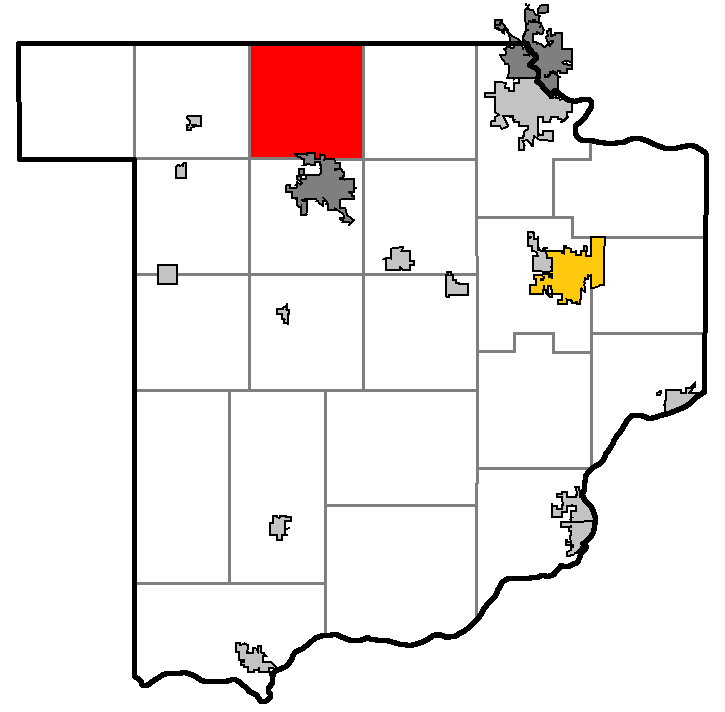
- Location of the Town of Winfield, Wisconsin

- Location of Sauk County, Wisconsin
- Coordinates: 43°35′37″N 90°1′17″W
- Country: United States
- State: Wisconsin
- County: Sauk

Area
  - Total: 35.4 sq mi (91.8 km^{2})
  - Land: 35.4 sq mi (91.8 km^{2})
  - Water: 0 sq mi (0.0 km^{2})
- Elevation: 1,142 ft (348 m)

Population (2020)
  - Total: 890
  - Density: 25/sq mi (9.7/km^{2})
- Time zone: UTC-6 (Central (CST))
  - Summer (DST): UTC-5 (CDT)
- Area code: 608
- FIPS code: 55-87775
- GNIS feature ID: 1584455
- Website: https://townofwinfieldwi.gov/

The Town of Winfield is located in Sauk County, Wisconsin, United States. The population was 890 at the 2020 census.

== History ==
The town was named for General Winfield Scott, who gained fame in the Mexican-American War and was a candidate for president against Franklin Pierce.

== Geography ==
According to the United States Census Bureau, the town has a total area of 35.5 square miles (91.8 km^{2}), of which 35.4 square miles (91.8 km^{2}) is land and 0.03% is water.

== Demographics ==
As of the census of 2000, there were 752 people, 265 households, and 227 families residing in the town. The population density was 21.2 people per square mile (8.2/km^{2}). There were 297 housing units at an average density of 8.4 per square mile (3.2/km^{2}). The racial makeup of the town was 99.20% White, 0.13% Native American, 0.13% Asian, and 0.53% from two or more races. Hispanic or Latino of any race were 0.53% of the population.

There were 265 households, out of which 37.0% had children under the age of 18 living with them, 76.6% were married couples living together, 6.4% had a female householder with no husband present, and 14.3% were non-families. 9.1% of all households were made up of individuals, and 2.3% had someone living alone who was 65 years of age or older. The average household size was 2.84 and the average family size was 3.00.

In the town, the population was spread out, with 26.5% under the age of 18, 7.4% from 18 to 24, 29.5% from 25 to 44, 27.0% from 45 to 64, and 9.6% who were 65 years of age or older. The median age was 38 years. For every 100 females, there were 102.7 males. For every 100 females age 18 and over, there were 109.5 males.

The median income for a household in the town was $49,688, and the median income for a family was $51,375. Males had a median income of $32,222 versus $22,031 for females. The per capita income for the town was $20,717. About 4.3% of families and 3.0% of the population were below the poverty line, including 3.4% of those under age 18 and 9.8% of those age 65 or over.
