= James C. Reynolds =

American politician

James C. Reynolds (July 17, 1849 – September 4, 1933) was a member of the Wisconsin State Assembly and the Wisconsin State Senate.

== Biography ==
Reynolds was born on July 17, 1849, in Exeter, Wisconsin. He attended Beloit College, Racine College, Rush Medical College, and Bellevue Hospital Medical College. He died in Lake Geneva, Wisconsin, in 1933.

== Political career ==
Reynolds was a member of the Assembly during the 1885 and 1887 sessions and represented the 8th District of the Senate during the 1889 and 1891 sessions. He was a delegate to the 1900 Republican National Convention and a member of the village board of Lake Geneva.
