= David B. Hulburt =

American educator & politician (1829–1912)

David B. Hulburt (December 8, 1829 – September 19, 1912) was an American educator and politician.

Born in Portland, Chautauqua County, New York, Hulburt went to public schools in Fredonia, New York and graduated from the normal department at Fredonia Academy (now State University of New York at Fredonia). Hulburt moved to Loganville, Sauk County, Wisconsin, in 1857. Hulburt was a farmer and surveyor. He was also a merchant. During the American Civil War, Hulburt served as an enrollment officer. He also served as county surveyor for Sauk County, justice of the peace, town superintendent of schools, and was postmaster of Loganville. In 1876, 1877, 1878, and 1905, Hulburt served in the Wisconsin State Assembly and was a Republican. Hulburt also served in the Wisconsin State Senate from 1885 to 1889. In 1907, Hulburt moved to Reedsburg, Wisconsin to live in retirement, and then to his daughter's house in Madison, Wisconsin where he died.
