= Sheldon, Monroe County, Wisconsin =

Sheldon, Wisconsin
- Town
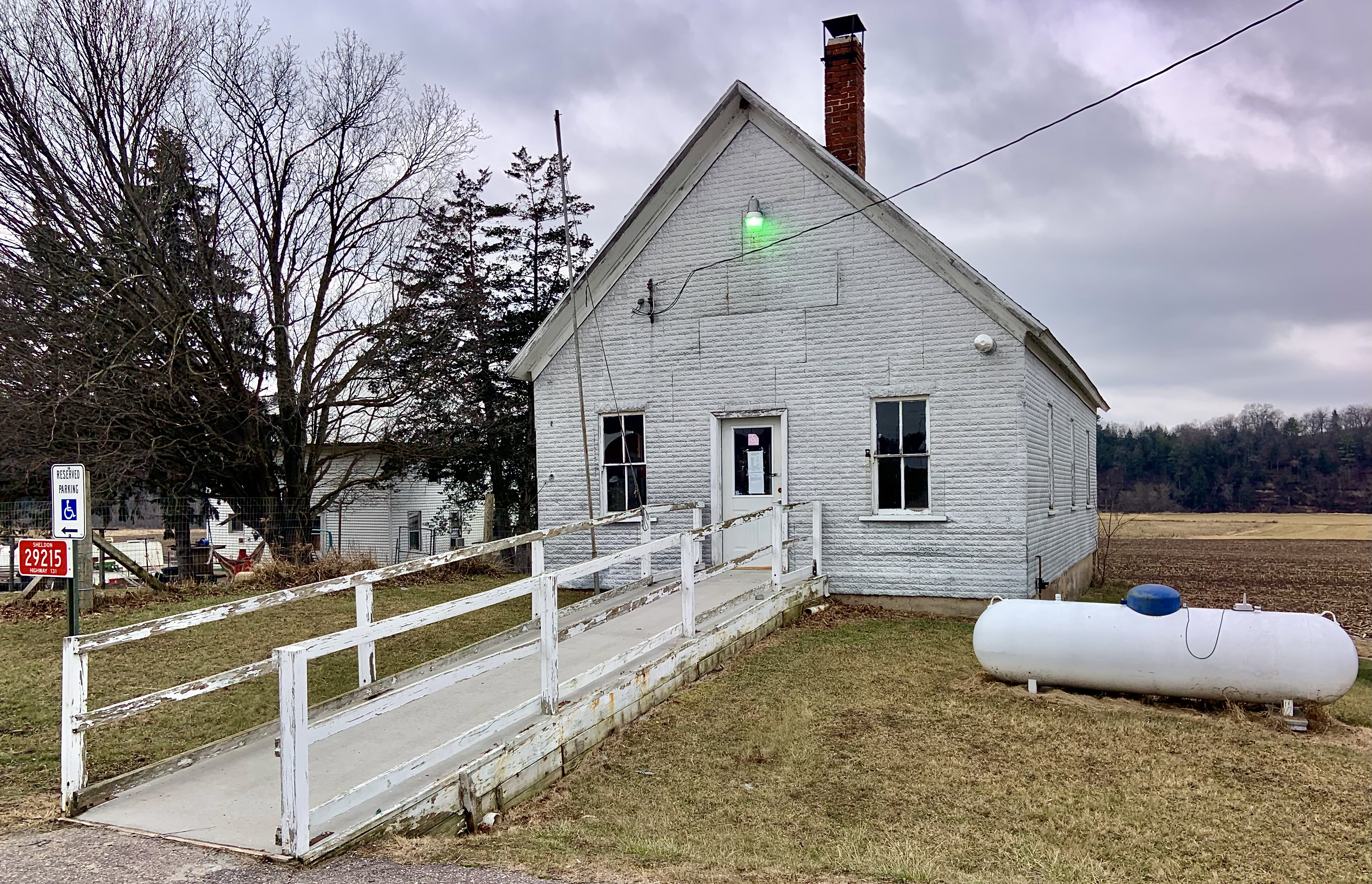
- Town hall

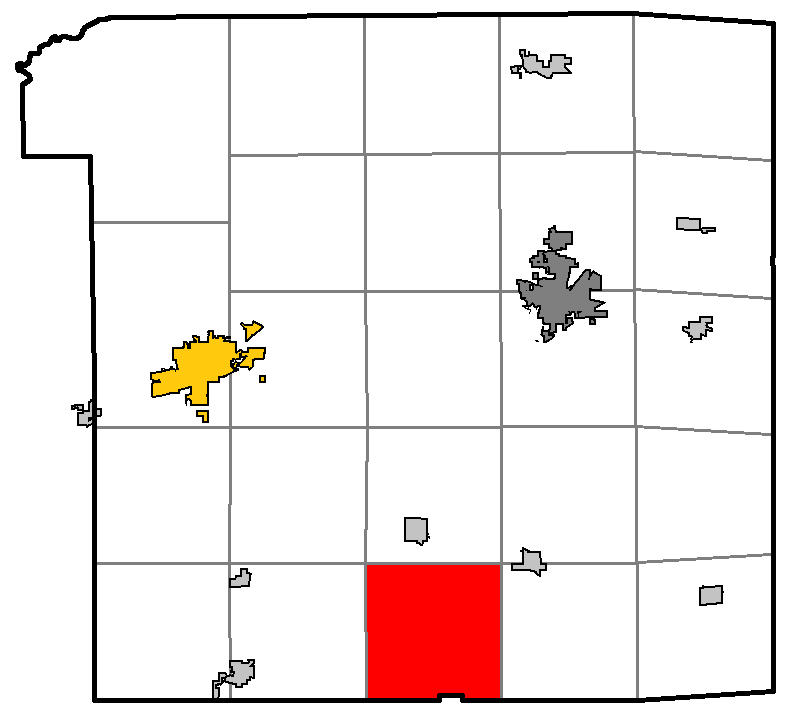
- Location of Sheldon, Monroe County, Wisconsin

- Location of Monroe County, Wisconsin
- Coordinates: 43°44′53″N 90°36′28″W
- Country: United States
- State: Wisconsin
- County: Monroe

Area
  - Total: 35.3 sq mi (91.5 km^{2})
  - Land: 35.3 sq mi (91.5 km^{2})
  - Water: 0 sq mi (0.0 km^{2})
- Elevation: 981 ft (299 m)

Population (2020)
  - Total: 649
  - Density: 18.4/sq mi (7.09/km^{2})
- Time zone: UTC-6 (Central (CST))
  - Summer (DST): UTC-5 (CDT)
- Area code: 608
- FIPS code: 55-73150
- GNIS feature ID: 1584141

Sheldon is a town in Monroe County, Wisconsin, United States. The population was 649 at the 2020 census. The unincorporated community of Oil City, Wisconsin is located within the town of Sheldon.

== Geography ==
According to the United States Census Bureau, the town has a total area of 35.3 square miles (91.5 km^{2}), all land.

== Demographics ==
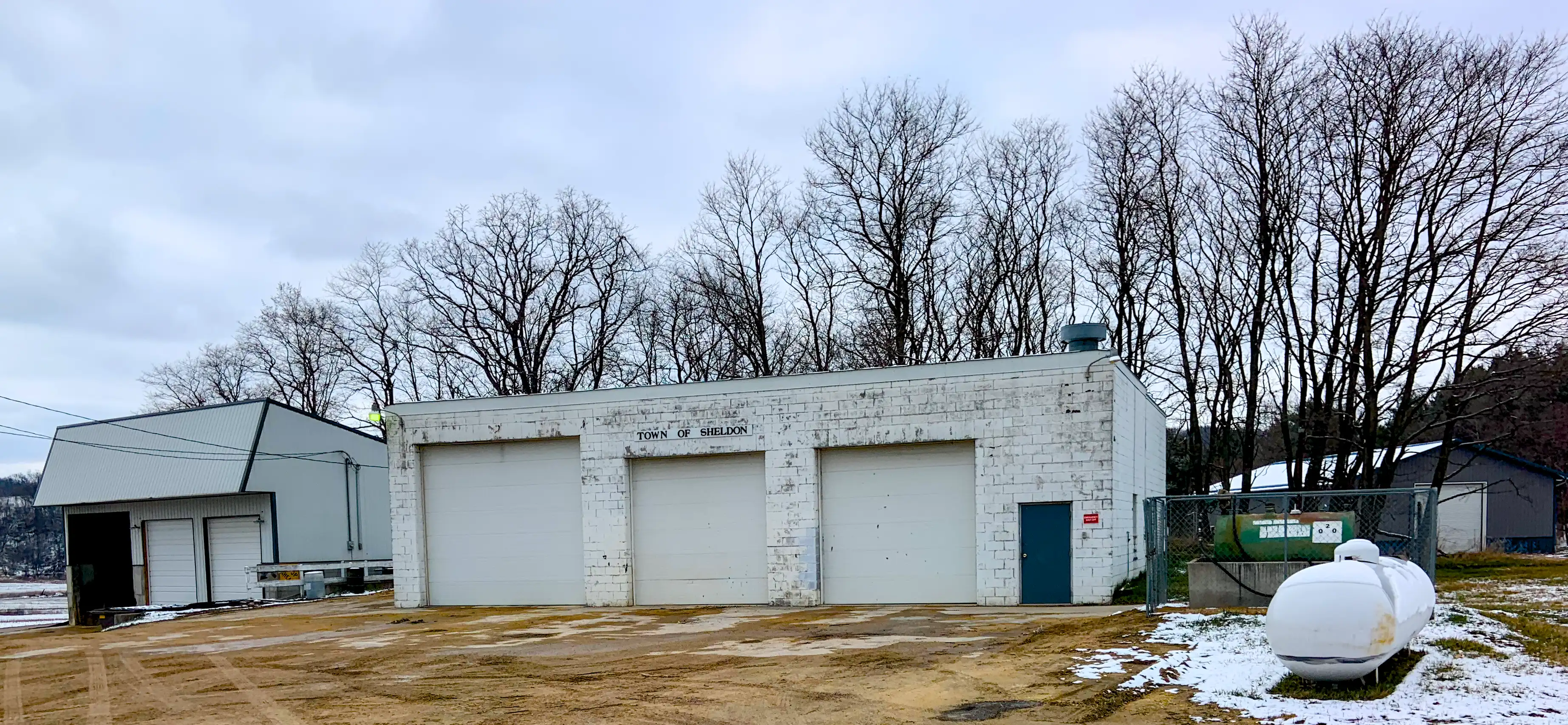
Sheldon Town Shop

As of the census of 2000, there were 682 people, 190 households, and 156 families residing in the town. The population density was 19.3 people per square mile (7.5/km^{2}). There were 214 housing units at an average density of 6.1 per square mile (2.3/km^{2}). The racial makeup of the town was 98.68% White, 0.29% African American, 0.29% from other races, and 0.73% from two or more races. Hispanic or Latino of any race were 1.17% of the population.

There were 190 households, out of which 47.9% had children under the age of 18 living with them, 72.6% were married couples living together, 6.8% had a female householder with no husband present, and 17.4% were non-families. 15.3% of all households were made up of individuals, and 4.7% had someone living alone who was 65 years of age or older. The average household size was 3.59 and the average family size was 4.02.

In the town, the population was spread out, with 41.3% under the age of 18, 9.5% from 18 to 24, 25.5% from 25 to 44, 17.7% from 45 to 64, and 5.9% who were 65 years of age or older. The median age was 24 years. For every 100 females, there were 107.9 males. For every 100 females age 18 and over, there were 103.0 males.

The median income for a household in the town was $32,361, and the median income for a family was $32,250. Males had a median income of $24,688 versus $19,750 for females. The per capita income for the town was $11,049. About 21.3% of families and 28.6% of the population were below the poverty line, including 43.2% of those under age 18 and 15.9% of those age 65 or over.
