= 39th Wisconsin Legislature =

Wisconsin legislative term for 1889-1890

←	38th	40th	→
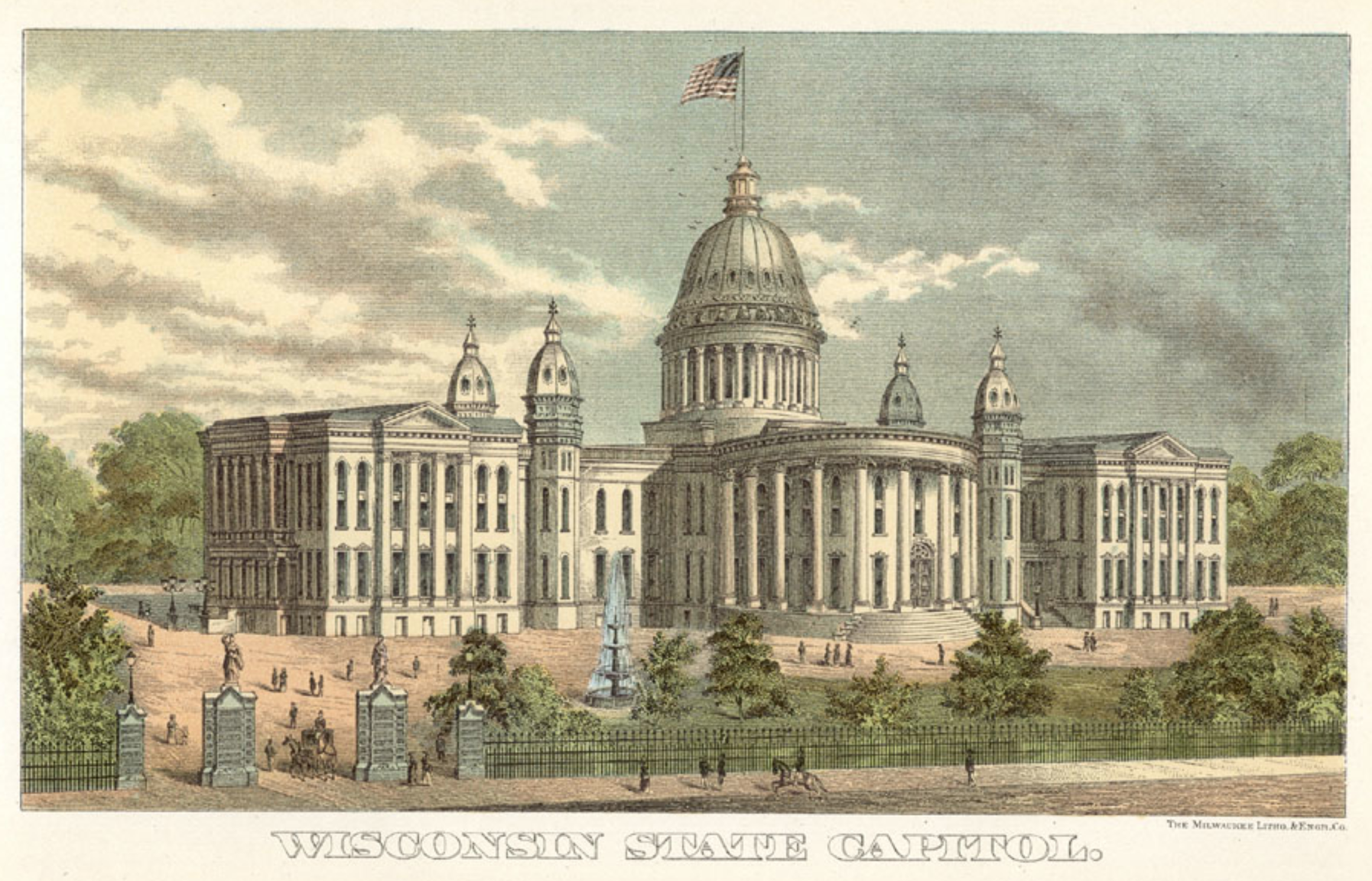
- Wisconsin State Capitol, 1887

Overview
- Legislative body: Wisconsin Legislature
- Meeting place: Wisconsin State Capitol
- Term: January 7, 1889 – January 5, 1891
- Election: November 6, 1888

Senate
- Members: 33
- Senate President: George W. Ryland (R)
- President pro tempore: Thomas A. Dyson (R)
- Party control: Republican

Assembly
- Members: 100
- Assembly Speaker: Thomas B. Mills (R)
- Party control: Republican

Sessions
- 1st: January 9, 1889 – April 19, 1889

The Thirty-Ninth Wisconsin Legislature convened from January 9, 1889, to April 19, 1889, in regular session.

This was the first legislative session after the redistricting of the Senate and Assembly according to an act of the previous session.

Senators representing even-numbered districts were newly elected for this session and were serving the first two years of a four-year term. Assembly members were elected to a two-year term. Assembly members and even-numbered senators were elected in the general election of November 6, 1888. Senators representing odd-numbered districts were serving the third and fourth year of a four-year term, having been elected in the general election of November 2, 1886.

The governor of Wisconsin during this entire term was Republican William D. Hoard, of Jefferson County, serving a two-year term, having won election in the 1888 Wisconsin gubernatorial election.

== Major events ==
- January 7, 1889: Inauguration of William D. Hoard as the 16th Governor of Wisconsin.
- March 4, 1889: Inauguration of Benjamin Harrison as the 23rd President of the United States
- April 2, 1889: At the state's spring general election, Wisconsin voters approved an amendment to the Constitution of Wisconsin which abolished the separate offices of "chief justice" and "associate justices" of the Wisconsin Supreme Court, converting all members to "justices" and designating that the most senior justice would serve as chief justice.
- May 1889: First reported cases associated with the 1889–1890 pandemic.
- November 8, 1889: Montana was admitted as the 41st U.S. state.
- November 11, 1889: Washington was admitted as the 42nd U.S. state.
- March 18, 1890: The Wisconsin Supreme Court published its decision in State ex rel. Weiss v. District Board of School District No. Eight, also known as the Edgerton Bible Case. The Court ruled that the use of the bible in public school instruction was an unconstitutional merging of church and state. This decision was later cited by the United States Supreme Court in its 1963 decision banning compulsory prayer in schools.
- March 20, 1890: The new German Emperor Wilhelm II dismissed long-time German chancellor Otto von Bismarck.
- May 1, 1890: Coordinated mass rallies and strikes were held in the United States to call for an eight-hour workday.
- July 2, 1890: U.S. President Benjamin Harrison signed the Sherman Antitrust Act of 1890 into law.
- July 3, 1890: Idaho was admitted as the 43rd U.S. state.
- July 10, 1890: Wyoming was admitted as the 44th U.S. state.
- July 14, 1890: U.S. President Benjamin Harrison signed the Sherman Silver Purchase Act into law. The law increased the amount of silver the U.S. government would purchase, in order to encourage inflation.
- October 1, 1890: U.S. President Benjamin Harrison signed the Tariff Act of 1890, raising the average tariff on imports to 50%.
- November 4, 1890: George Wilbur Peck elected Governor of Wisconsin.
- December 29, 1890: The 7th U.S. Cavalry Regiment killed 153 Lakota Sioux at Wounded Knee, South Dakota, in an incident known as the Wounded Knee Massacre.

== Major legislation ==
- April 18, 1889: An Act concerning the education and employment of children, 1889 Act 519. Referred to as the "Bennett Law". The main purpose of the act was to raise the minimum employment age from 12 to 13 and required parents and guardians to ensure that children between the ages of 7 and 14 were receiving at least 12 weeks of education per year. "Section 5" of the act defined a "school" as only one which provided instructions solely in the English language. This proved to be a highly controversial move in a state which had many German, Polish, and Scandinavian language schools. The backlash against the law likely contributed significantly to the Democratic wave election in 1890.
- Joint Resolution agreeing to a proposed amendment to the constitution, 1889 Joint Resolution 3. This was the required second legislative passage of a proposed amendment to the Wisconsin Constitution to abolish the separate offices of "chief justice" and "associate justices" of the Wisconsin Supreme Court and instead define all members of the court as "justices" with the most senior justice acting as "chief justice". This amendment was ratified by voters at the 1889 spring general election.
- Joint Resolution proposing an amendment to section 1, of article 10, of the constitution of the state of Wisconsin, relating to Education, 1889 Joint Resolution 7. This was another attempt to amend the section of the Constitution of Wisconsin dealing with the Superintendent of Public Instruction. The previous attempt had just been defeated in an 1888 referendum.

== Party summary ==
=== Senate summary ===
Senate partisan composition Democratic: 6 seats Union Labor: 2 seats Independent: 1 seat Republican: 24 seats

	Party (Shading indicates majority caucus)				Total	
	Dem.	Union Labor	Ind.	Rep.	Total	Vacant
End of previous Legislature	6	1	1	25	33	0
1st Session	6	2	1	24	33	0
Final voting share	27.27%			72.73%		
Beginning of the next Legislature	19	0	0	14	33	0

=== Assembly summary ===
Assembly partisan composition Democratic: 29 seats Republican: 71 seats

	Party (Shading indicates majority caucus)				Total	
	Dem.	Union Labor	Ind.	Rep.	Total	Vacant
End of previous Legislature	34	5	4	57	100	0
1st Session	29	0	0	71	100	0
Final voting share	29%			71%		
Beginning of the next Legislature	66	1	0	33	100	0

== Sessions ==
- 1st Regular session: January 9, 1889 – April 19, 1889

== Leaders ==
=== Senate leadership ===
- President of the Senate: George W. Ryland (R)
- President pro tempore: Thomas A. Dyson (R)

=== Assembly leadership ===
- Speaker of the Assembly: Thomas B. Mills (R)

== Members ==
=== Members of the Senate ===
Members of the Senate for the Thirty-Ninth Wisconsin Legislature:

Senate partisan representation Democratic: 6 seats Labor: 2 seats Independent: 1 seat Republican: 24 seats

Dist.	Counties	Senator	Residence	Party
01	Door, Marinette, & Oconto	Edward Scofield	Oconto	Rep.
02	Brown & Calumet	Enos W. Persons	De Pere	Dem.
03	Racine	Henry A. Cooper	Racine	Rep.
04	Milwaukee (City North)	John J. Kempf	Milwaukee	Rep.
05	Milwaukee (City Center)	Theodore Fritz	Milwaukee	Union Lab.
06	Milwaukee (City South)	Herman Kroeger	Milwaukee	Union Lab.
07	Milwaukee (County)	Christian Widule	Milwaukee	Rep.
08	Kenosha & Walworth	James C. Reynolds	Lake Geneva	Rep.
09	Green Lake, Portage, Waushara, & western Marathon	George Fitch	Berlin	Rep.
10	Pierce & St. Croix	Horace A. Taylor	Hudson	Rep.
11	Ashland, Florence, Forest, Langlade, Lincoln, Price, & Taylor	George F. Merrill	Ashland	Rep.
12	Green & Lafayette	Phineas Clawson	Monroe	Rep.
13	Dodge	Charles Pettibone	Juneau	Ind.
14	Juneau & Sauk	Frank Avery	Baraboo	Rep.
15	Kewaunee & Manitowoc	William F. Nash	Two Rivers	Dem.
16	Crawford & Grant	Edward I. Kidd	Millville	Rep.
17	Rock	Allen P. Lovejoy	Janesville	Rep.
18	Fond du Lac (Western Part)	Samuel B. Stanchfield	Fond du Lac	Rep.
19	Winnebago (Except Manasha)	George H. Buckstaff	Oshkosh	Rep.
20	Sheboygan & Eastern Fond du Lac	Major C. Mead	Plymouth	Dem.
21	Shawano, Waupaca, & eastern Marathon	John E. Leahy	Wausau	Rep.
22	Outagamie (Plus Manasha)	William Kennedy	Appleton	Dem.
23	Jefferson & western Waukesha	Walter S. Greene	Fort Atkinson	Dem.
24	Barron, Bayfield, Burnett, Douglas, Polk, Sawyer, & Washburn	Charles S. Taylor	Barron	Rep.
25	Clark & Eau Claire	William A. Rust	Eau Claire	Rep.
26	Dane	Willett Main	Madison	Rep.
27	Adams, Columbia & Marquette	Levi E. Pond	Westfield	Rep.
28	Iowa & Richland	Robert Joiner	Wyoming	Rep.
29	Buffalo, Trempealeau, & Pepin	John W. DeGroff	Alma	Rep.
30	Chippewa & Dunn	William Millar	Red Cedar	Rep.
31	La Crosse & Vernon	Thomas A. Dyson	La Crosse	Rep.
32	Jackson, Monroe, & Wood	Hugh H. Price	Black River Falls	Rep.
33	Ozaukee, Washington, & eastern Waukesha	Peter Lochen	Trenton	Dem.

=== Members of the Assembly ===
Members of the Assembly for the Thirty-Ninth Wisconsin Legislature:

Assembly partisan composition Democratic: 29 seats Republican: 71 seats

Milwaukee County districts

Senate District	County	Dist.	Representative	Party	Residence
27	Adams & Marquette		John W. Gunning	Rep.	Friendship
11	Ashland, Florence, Forest, Oneida, & Price		Peter H. Leonard	Rep.	Fifield
24	Barron		Charles W. Moore	Rep.	Chetek
24	Bayfield, Burnett, Douglas, Sawyer, & Washburn		Lewis H. Mead	Rep.	Shell Lake
02	Brown	1	Albert L. Gray	Dem.	Fort Howard
02	Brown	2	Robert J. McGeehan	Dem.	De Pere
29	Buffalo		John W. Whelan	Rep.	Mondovi
02	Calumet		William V. McMullen	Dem.	Brillion
30	Chippewa		Benjamin F. Millard	Rep.	Chippewa Falls
25	Clark		Merritt C. Ring	Rep.	Neillsville
27	Columbia	1	Christian F. Mohr	Rep.	Portage
27	Columbia	2	Theodore Henton	Rep.	Otsego
16	Crawford		Hugh Porter	Rep.	Seneca
26	Dane	1	David Stephens	Rep.	Madison
26	Dane	2	H. F. William Fehlandt	Dem.	Mazomanie
26	Dane	3	Peter O. Baker	Rep.	Primrose
26	Dane	4	Henry G. Klinefelter	Rep.	Nora
13	Dodge	1	Thomas F. Solon	Dem.	Shields
13	Dodge	2	John Stoddart	Dem.	Fox Lake
13	Dodge	3	John A. Barney	Dem.	Mayville
01	Door		Hans Johnson	Rep.	Liberty Grove
30	Dunn		Stewart J. Bailey	Rep.	Menomonie
25	Eau Claire	1	Hobart Stocking	Rep.	Eau Claire
25	Eau Claire	2	George Caldwell	Rep.	Otter Creek
18	Fond du Lac	1	Charles F. Simmons	Rep.	Ripon
18	Fond du Lac	2	James W. Watson	Dem.	Fond du Lac
20	Fond du Lac	3	Peter Loehr	Dem.	Forest
16	Grant	1	James B. McCoy	Rep.	Platteville
16	Grant	2	Reuben B. Showalter	Rep.	Lancaster
16	Grant	3	A. C. V. Elston	Rep.	Muscoda
12	Green & Lafayette	1	Philip Allen	Rep.	Cadiz
12	Green & Lafayette	2	Charles F. Osborn	Rep.	Darlington
12	Green & Lafayette	3	James W. Freeman	Rep.	Shullsburg
09	Green Lake		E. C. Smith	Dem.	Markesan
28	Iowa	1	Nicholas T. Martin	Rep.	Mineral Point
28	Iowa	2	Michael J. Bennett	Rep.	Clyde
32	Jackson		Thomas B. Mills	Rep.	Millston
23	Jefferson	1	Carl R. Feld	Dem.	Watertown
23	Jefferson	2	Mark Curtis	Rep.	Hebron
14	Juneau		Joseph W. Babcock	Rep.	Necedah
08	Kenosha		Dwight L. Burgess	Rep.	Salem
15	Kewaunee & Manitowoc	1	Emil P. Scheibe	Dem.	Centerville
15	Kewaunee & Manitowoc	2	Isaac Craite	Dem.	Mishicot
15	Kewaunee & Manitowoc	3	James S. Anderson	Rep.	Manitowoc
15	Kewaunee & Manitowoc	4	Joseph Wery	Dem.	Darbellay
31	La Crosse	1	James J. Hogan	Dem.	La Crosse
31	La Crosse	2	William Smith	Rep.	Bangor
11	Langlade, Lincoln, & Taylor		Hermann R. Fehland	Dem.	Merrill
09	Marathon	1	Joseph Chesak	Dem.	Rietbrock
21	Marathon	2	Matthew Beebe	Dem.	Wausau
01	Marinette		Patrick Clifford	Dem.	Marinette
04	Milwaukee	1	Michael Dunn	Dem.	Milwaukee
05	Milwaukee	2	Frank E. Woller	Rep.	Milwaukee
06	Milwaukee	3	Edward Keogh	Dem.	Milwaukee
05	Milwaukee	4	William J. McElroy	Rep.	Milwaukee
06	Milwaukee	5	Henry Siebers	Rep.	Milwaukee
04	Milwaukee	6	Christopher Raesser	Rep.	Milwaukee
05	Milwaukee	7	Henry E. Legler	Rep.	Milwaukee
07	Milwaukee	8	Amos Thomas	Rep.	Milwaukee
04	Milwaukee	9	Charles Christiaansen	Rep.	Milwaukee
07	Milwaukee	10	Charles Elkert	Rep.	Milwaukee
07	Milwaukee	11	William L. Dennis	Rep.	Milwaukee
06	Milwaukee	12	Edward I. Slupecki	Dem.	Milwaukee
32	Monroe	1	William H. Blyton	Rep.	Sparta
32	Monroe	2	James R. Lyon	Rep.	Glendale
01	Oconto		Charles Hall	Rep.	Oconto
33	Outagamie	1	Louis L. Jabas	Dem.	Appleton
33	Outagamie	2	Theodore Knapstein	Dem.	New London
33	Ozaukee		Frederick W. Horn	Ind.D.	Cedarburg
29	Pepin		Vivus W. Dorwin	Rep.	Durand
10	Pierce		Daniel J. Dill	Rep.	Prescott
24	Polk		James H. McCourt	Rep.	St. Croix Falls
09	Portage		Edward McGlachlin	Rep.	Stevens Point
03	Racine		Alfred L. Buchan	Rep.	Dover
28	Richland		Robert H. DeLap	Rep.	Richland Center
17	Rock	1	Martin V. Pratt	Rep.	Evansville
17	Rock	2	Cyrus Miner	Rep.	Janesville
17	Rock	3	Henry Tarrant	Rep.	La Prairie
14	Sauk	1	Thomas Hill	Rep.	Spring Green
14	Sauk	2	Benjamin G. Paddock	Rep.	La Valle
21	Shawano & Waupaca	1	Evan Coolidge	Rep.	Waupaca
21	Shawano & Waupaca	2	Jacob Wipf	Rep.	Iola
21	Shawano & Waupaca	3	Robert W. Jackson	Rep.	Shawano
20	Sheboygan	1	Valentine Detling	Dem.	Sheboygan
20	Sheboygan	2	Charles A. Corbett	Rep.	Greenbush
20	Sheboygan	3	Ellis C. Oliver	Rep.	Holland
10	St. Croix		Edward Conner	Rep.	Woodville
29	Trempealeau		Knudt Hagestad	Rep.	Ettrick
31	Vernon	1	John Stevenson	Rep.	Chaseburg
31	Vernon	2	Thomas J. Shear	Rep.	Hillsboro
08	Walworth	1	Fernando C. Kizer	Rep.	Whitewater
08	Walworth	2	Dwight S. Allen	Rep.	Lake Geneva
33	Washington		Frederick C. Schuler	Dem	Farmington
33	Waukesha	1	George Winans	Dem.	Waukesha
23	Waukesha	2	Ephraim Beaumont	Rep.	Merton
09	Waushara		William B. La Selle	Rep.	Plainfield
19	Winnebago	1	George W. Pratt	Dem.	Oshkosh
19	Winnebago	2	Walter L. Miller	Rep.	Winneconne
19	Winnebago	3	Casper Schmidt	Rep.	Oshkosh
32	Wood		Robert Connor	Rep.	Auburndale

== Committees ==
=== Senate committees ===
- Senate Committee on Agriculture – S. B. Stanchfield, chair
- Senate Committee on Assessment and Collection of Taxes – J. E. Leahy, chair
- Senate Committee on Education – C. Widule, chair
- Senate Committee on Enrolled Bills – J. W. DeGroff, chair
- Senate Committee on Engrossed Bills – P. J. Clawson, chair
- Senate Committee on Federal Relations – H. A. Cooper, chair
- Senate Committee on Finance, Banks, and Insurance – G. H. Buckstaff, chair
- Senate Committee on Incorporations – W. A. Rust, chair
- Senate Committee on the Judiciary – George F. Merrill, chair
- Senate Committee on Legislative Expenditures – W. S. Main, chair
- Senate Committee on Manufacturing and Commerce – H. A. Taylor, chair
- Senate Committee on Military Affairs – E. Scofield, chair
- Senate Committee on Privileges and Elections – E. Scofield, chair
- Senate Committee on Public Lands – R. E. Joiner, chair
- Senate Committee on Railroads – George Fitch, chair
- Senate Committee on Roads and Bridges – Frank Avery, chair
- Senate Committee on State Affairs – A. P. Lovejoy, chair
- Senate Committee on Town and County Organizations – J. C. Reynolds, chair

=== Assembly committees ===
- Assembly Committee on Agriculture – E. Beaumont, chair
- Assembly Committee on Assessment and Collection of Taxes – J. W. Whelan, chair
- Assembly Committee on Bills on their Third Reading – Hugh Porter, chair
- Assembly Committee on Cities – H. E. Legler, chair
- Assembly Committee on Education – M. J. Bennett, chair
- Assembly Committee on Engrossed Bills – H. G. Klinefelter, chair
- Assembly Committee on Enrolled Bills – C. F. Simmons, chair
- Assembly Committee on Federal Relations – James W. Freeman, chair
- Assembly Committee on Incorporations – J. W. Babcock, chair
- Assembly Committee on Insurance, Banks, and Banking – W. H. Blyton, chair
- Assembly Committee on the Judiciary – W. J. McElroy, chair
- Assembly Committee on Legislative Expenditures – Dwight S. Allen, chair
- Assembly Committee on Labor and Manufactures – V. W. Dorwin, chair
- Assembly Committee on Lumber and Mining – J. H. McCourt, chair
- Assembly Committee on Medical Societies – R. H. Delap, chair
- Assembly Committee on Militia – J. B. McCoy, chair
- Assembly Committee on Privileges and Elections – W. B. La Selle, chair
- Assembly Committee on Public Improvements – K. K. Hagestad, chair
- Assembly Committee on Public Lands – C. F. Mohr, chair
- Assembly Committee on Railroads – R. W. Jackson, chair
- Assembly Committee on Roads and Bridges – John Stevenson, chair
- Assembly Committee on State Affairs – H. M. Stocking, chair
- Assembly Committee on Town and County Organization – Charles Hall, chair
- Assembly Committee on Ways and Means – E. C. Oliver, chair
- Assembly Special Committee on Labor and Industries – Henry Siebers, chair

=== Joint committees ===
- Joint Committee on Charitable and Penal Institutions – L. E. Pond (Sen.) & R. B. Showalter (Asm.), co-chairs
- Joint Committee on Claims – E. I. Kidd (Sen.) & Evan Coolidge (Asm.), co-chairs
- Joint Committee on Printing – C. A. Pettibone (Sen.) & E. McGlachlin (Asm.), co-chairs

== Changes from the 38th Legislature ==
New districts for the 39th Legislature were defined in 1887 Wisconsin Act 461, passed into law in the 38th Wisconsin Legislature.

=== Senate redistricting ===
==== Summary of changes ====
- 11 Senate districts were left unchanged (or were only renumbered).
- Milwaukee County went from having 3 districts to 4 (4, 5, 6, 7).
- Waukesha County was divided between two multi-county districts with Jefferson (23) and with Washington and Ozaukee (33).
- Marathon County was divided between two multi-county districts with Green Lake, Portage, and Waushara (9) and with Shawano and Waupaca (21).
- Eau Claire and Jackson became a shared district (25) after having been in separate multi-county districts.
- Pierce and St. Croix became a shared district (10) after having been in separate multi-county districts.
- Crawford, Grant, La Crosse, and Vernon went from sharing 3 districts to 2 (16, 31).
- Manitowoc County went from having its own district to sharing a district with Kewaunee County (15).
- Brown County went from having its own district to sharing a district with Calumet County (2).

==== Partisan implications ====
- Republicans had 13 safe seats, down from 18.
- Democrats had 5 safe seats, down from 6.
- 15 seats were competitive, up from 9.

==== Senate districts ====
after redistricting, changes highlighted

before redistricting

Dist.	38th Legislature	39th Legislature
1	Door, Florence, Kewaunee, Langlade, Marinette, Oconto counties	Door, Marinette, Oconto counties
2	Brown County	Brown, Calumet counties
3	Racine County	Racine County
4	Crawford, Vernon counties	Milwaukee County (city north)
5	Northern Milwaukee County	Milwaukee County (city center)
6	Southern Milwaukee County	Milwaukee County (city south)
7	Central Milwaukee County	Milwaukee County (outside the city)
8	Kenosha, Walworth counties	Kenosha, Walworth counties
9	Green Lake, Portage, Waushara counties	Green Lake, Portage, Waushara, western Marathon counties
10	Waukesha County	Pierce, St. Croix counties
11	Ashland, Clark, Lincoln, Price, Taylor, Wood counties	Ashland, Florence, Forest, Langlade, Lincoln, Price, Taylor counties
12	Green, Lafayette counties	Green, Lafayette counties
13	Dodge County	Dodge County
14	Juneau, Sauk counties	Juneau, Sauk counties
15	Manitowoc County	Kewaunee, Manitowoc counties
16	Grant County	Crawford, Grant counties
17	Rock County	Rock County
18	Western Fond du Lac County	Western Fond du Lac County
19	Winnebago County	Winnebago County (except Menasha)
20	Sheboygan, Eastern Fond du Lac counties	Sheboygan, Eastern Fond du Lac counties
21	Marathon, Shawano, Waupaca counties	Shawano, Waupaca, eastern Marathon counties
22	Calumet, Outagamie counties	Outagamie County (and Menasha)
23	Jefferson County	Jefferson, western Waukesha counties
24	Barron, Bayfield, Burnett, Douglas, Polk, St. Croix, Washburn counties	Barron, Bayfield, Burnett, Douglas, Polk, Sawyer, Washburn counties
25	Eau Claire, Pepin, Pierce counties	Clark, Eau Claire counties
26	Dane County	Dane County
27	Adams, Columbia, Marquette counties	Adams, Columbia, Marquette counties
28	Iowa, Richland counties	Iowa, Richland counties
29	Buffalo, Trempealeau counties	Buffalo, Pepin, Trempealeau counties
30	Chippewa, Dunn, Sawyer counties	Chippewa, Dunn counties
31	La Crosse County	La Crosse, Vernon counties
32	Jackson, Monroe counties	Jackson, Monroe, Wood counties
33	Ozaukee, Washington counties	Ozaukee, Washington, eastern Waukesha counties

=== Assembly redistricting ===
==== Summary of changes ====
- 42 districts were left unchanged (or were only renumbered).
- Barron County became its own district after previously having been in a shared district with Bayfield, Burnett, Douglas, and Washburn counties.
- Dane County went from having 5 districts to 4.
- Dodge County went from having 4 districts to 3.
- Eau Claire County went from having 1 district to 2.
- La Crosse County went from having 1 district to 2.
- Marathon County went from having 1 district to 2.
- Oconto County became its own district after previously having been in a shared district with Forest and Langlade counties
- Racine County went from having 2 districts to 1.
- Washington County went from having 2 districts to 1.
- Waukesha County went from having 1 district to 2.

==== Assembly districts ====
after redistricting, changes highlighted

before redistricting

County	Districts in 38th Legislature	Districts in 39th Legislature	Change
Adams	Shared with Marquette	Shared with Marquette	Steady
Ashland	Shared with Lincoln, Oneida, Price, Sawyer, & Taylor	Shared with Florence, Forest, Oneida, & Price	Steady
Barron	Shared with Bayfield, Burnett, Douglas, & Washburn	1 District	▲
Bayfield	Shared with Barron, Burnett, Douglas, & Washburn	Shared with Burnett, Douglas, Sawyer, & Washburn	Steady
Brown	2 Districts	2 Districts	Steady
Buffalo	1 District	1 District	Steady
Burnett	Shared with Barron, Bayfield, Douglas, & Washburn	Shared with Bayfield, Douglas, Sawyer, & Washburn	Steady
Calumet	1 District and 1 shared with Outagamie	1 District	▼
Chippewa	1 District	1 District	Steady
Clark	1 District	1 District	Steady
Columbia	2 Districts	2 Districts	Steady
Crawford	1 District	1 District	Steady
Dane	5 Districts	4 Districts	▼
Dodge	4 Districts	3 Districts	▼
Door	1 District	1 District	Steady
Douglas	Shared with Barron, Bayfield, Burnett, & Washburn	Shared with Bayfield, Burnett, Sawyer, & Washburn	Steady
Dunn	1 District	1 District	Steady
Eau Claire	1 District	2 Districts	▲
Florence	Shared with Marinette	Shared with Ashland, Forest, Oneida, & Price	Steady
Fond du Lac	3 Districts	3 Districts	Steady
Forest	Shared with Langlade & Oconto	Shared with Ashland, Florence, Oneida, & Price	Steady
Grant	3 Districts	3 Districts	Steady
Green	2 Districts	1 District and 1 shared with Lafayette	▼
Green Lake	1 District	1 District	Steady
Iowa	2 Districts	2 Districts	Steady
Jackson	1 District	1 District	Steady
Jefferson	2 Districts	2 Districts	Steady
Juneau	1 District	1 District	Steady
Kenosha	1 District	1 District	Steady
Kewaunee	1 District	1 District	Steady
La Crosse	1 District	2 Districts	▲
Lafayette	2 Districts	1 District and 1 shared with Green	▼
Langlade	Shared with Forest & Oconto	Shared with Lincoln & Taylor	Steady
Lincoln	Shared with Ashland, Oneida, Price, Sawyer, & Taylor	Shared with Langlade & Taylor	Steady
Manitowoc	3 Districts	2 Districts and 1 shared with Kewaunee	▼
Marathon	1 District	2 Districts	▲
Marinette	Shared with Florence	1 District	▲
Marquette	Shared with Adams	Shared with Adams	Steady
Milwaukee	12 Districts	12 Districts	Steady
Monroe	2 Districts	2 Districts	Steady
Oconto	Shared with Forest & Langlade	1 District	▲
Outagamie	2 Districts and 1 shared with Calumet	2 Districts	▼
Ozaukee	1 District	1 District	Steady
Pepin	1 District	1 District	Steady
Pierce	1 District	1 District	Steady
Polk	1 District	1 District	Steady
Portage	1 District	1 District	Steady
Price	Shared with Ashland, Lincoln, Oneida, Sawyer, & Taylor	Shared with Ashland, Florence, Forest, & Oneida	Steady
Racine	2 Districts	1 District	▼
Richland	1 District	1 District	Steady
Rock	3 Districts	3 Districts	Steady
Sauk	2 Districts	2 Districts	Steady
Sawyer	Shared with Ashland, Lincoln, Oneida, Price, & Taylor	Shared with Bayfield, Burnett, Douglas, & Washburn	Steady
Shawano	1 District	1 District and 1 shared with Waupaca	▲
Sheboygan	3 Districts	3 Districts	Steady
St. Croix	1 District	1 District	Steady
Taylor	Shared with Ashland, Lincoln, Oneida, Price, & Sawyer	Shared with Langlade & Lincoln	Steady
Trempealeau	1 District	1 District	Steady
Vernon	2 Districts	2 Districts	Steady
Walworth	2 Districts	2 Districts	Steady
Washburn	Shared with Barron, Bayfield, Burnett, & Douglas	Shared with Bayfield, Burnett, Douglas, & Sawyer	Steady
Washington	2 Districts	1 District	▼
Waukesha	1 District	2 Districts	▲
Waupaca	2 Districts	1 District and 1 shared with Shawano	▼
Waushara	1 District	1 District	Steady
Winnebago	3 Districts	3 Districts	Steady
Wood	1 District	1 District	Steady

== Employees ==
=== Senate employees ===
- Chief Clerk: Charles E. Bross
  - 1st Assistant Clerk: J. O. Warriner
    - 2nd Assistant Clerk: J. S. Parkinson
  - Bookkeeper: J. T. Huntington
  - Engrossing Clerk: J. C. Bishop
  - Enrolling Clerk: C. A. Christiansen
  - Transcribing Clerk: F. W. Sacket
  - Proofreader: J. J. Esch
  - Index Clerk: Grace Winfield Bross
  - Clerk for the Judiciary Committee: Linton McNeel
  - Clerk for the Committee on Incorporations: Levi Earle Pond
  - Clerk for the Committee on Claims: L. B. Noyes
  - Clerk for the Committee on Engrossed Bills: Charles H. Barnett
  - Clerk for the Committee on Enrolled Bills: Tobias Voegeli
  - Clerk for the Committee on Railroads: J. T. Ellerson
  - Document Clerk: K. W. Jensen
- Sergeant-at-Arms: T. J. George
  - Assistant Sergeant-at-Arms: A. Townsend
- Postmaster: H. Stone Richardson
  - Assistant Postmaster: J. O. Newgard
- Gallery Attendant: A. W. Wineberg
- Document Room Attendant: Jesse Kevill
- Committee Room Attendants:
  - Fred O. De Groff
  - L. Blackstone
- Comparing Clerks:
  - Mrs. M. M. Fowler
  - R. W. Cheever
  - John Ashton
- Doorkeepers:
  - E. W. Cole
  - H. C. Folz
  - J. M. Schweern
  - J. F. Nelson
- Porter: John Malone
- Night Watch: B. H. Bronson
- Janitor: M. Thronson
- Messengers:
  - Clarence Taylor
  - Willie Leahy
  - George Lund
  - L. Spaulding
  - Albert Bellows
  - Prentice Flint
  - Carroll Davis
  - A. McDougal
  - F. G. Seymore
  - A. W. Paine

=== Assembly employees ===
- Chief Clerk: Edwin Coe
  - 1st Assistant Clerk: Walter L. Houser
    - 2nd Assistant Clerk: Oliver G. Munson
  - Bookkeeper: Walter W. Pollock
  - Engrossing Clerk: F. Z. Alexander
    - Assistant Engrossing Clerks:
      - E. P. Bryant
      - Frances M. Hall
  - Enrolling Clerk: Charles M. Durkee
    - Assistant Enrolling Clerk: Sarah North
  - Transcribing Clerk: Robert Hastreiter
    - Assistant Transcribing Clerks:
      - Joseph Albrecht
      - William Evans
  - Index Clerk: James Scott
  - Comparing Clerks:
    - W. F. Tenney
    - William Irvine
    - H. T. Ames
  - Clerk for the Judiciary Committee: William M. Foster
  - Clerk for the Committee on Enrolled Bills: G. H. Downey
  - Clerk for the Committee on Engrossed Bills: C. D. Fish
  - Clerk for the Committee on State Affairs: Andrew Rohnscheib
  - Clerk for the Committee on Third Reading: J. M. Craigo
  - Document Clerk: H. J. Ormsby
  - Custodian of the Engrossing and Enrolling Rooms: Richard O'Donnell
- Sergeant-at-Arms: F. E. Parsons
  - Assistant Sergeant-at-Arms: H. N. Davis
- Postmaster: William T. Pugh
  - Assistant Postmaster: John B. Nugent
- Doorkeepers:
  - W. J. Zettler
  - Sure Johnson
  - J. K. Fisher
  - C. W. Blay
- Gallery Attendants:
  - Ira S. Vaughn
  - H. H. Lampman
- Committee Room Attendants:
  - T. B. Rowlands
  - Theodore Stenehjen
- Document Room Attendant: George L. Jones
- Gallery Attendants:
  - George Hanover
  - Hans C. Haller
- Porter: A. B. Lynn
- Police: F. O. Janzen
- Flagman: John Olson
- Night Watch: R. W. Jones
- Wash Room Attendant: W. B. Patterson
- Messengers:
  - Lewis Olson
  - Charles H. McCourt
  - Lewis Skinner
  - Louis Kreuger
  - Willie Berg
  - Robert Bissert
  - George Dean
  - Lewis Gregorson
  - Clyde L. Kimball
  - Frank Kelley
  - Eddie Dittmar
  - John Bucy
