= E. C. Smith =

E. C. Smith may refer to:

- Edgar C. Smith (Wisconsin politician) (1852–1913), American farmer, sheriff, and politician in Green Lake County, Wisconsin
- Erastus C. Smith (1810–1891), American politician and businessman in Rock County, Wisconsin
