= Magalloway =

Magalloway may refer to:

- Magalloway, Maine (formerly Magalloway Plantation), a township in Oxford County, Maine, U.S.
- Magalloway River, a river in the U.S. states of Maine and New Hampshire
- Mount Magalloway, a mountain in Pittsburg, New Hampshire, U.S.

== See also ==
- Peter McGalloway (1852–1931), American farmer and politician in Wisconsin
