= John Stoddart =

John Stoddart may refer to:

- John Stoddart (journalist) (1773–1856), English journalist and lawyer who served as editor of The Times
- John Stoddart (politician) (1842–1926), American politician
- John Stoddart (singer), American R&B/gospel singer-songwriter
- John Stoddart (stage designer) (1937–2001), Australian opera stage designer
- John Stoddart (tennis) (1962–2019), Australian tennis player
- John Fredrick Stoddart, colonial judge in Ceylon

== See also ==
- John Stoddard (disambiguation)
