= Henry Conner =

American politician and Union Army officer (1837–1918)

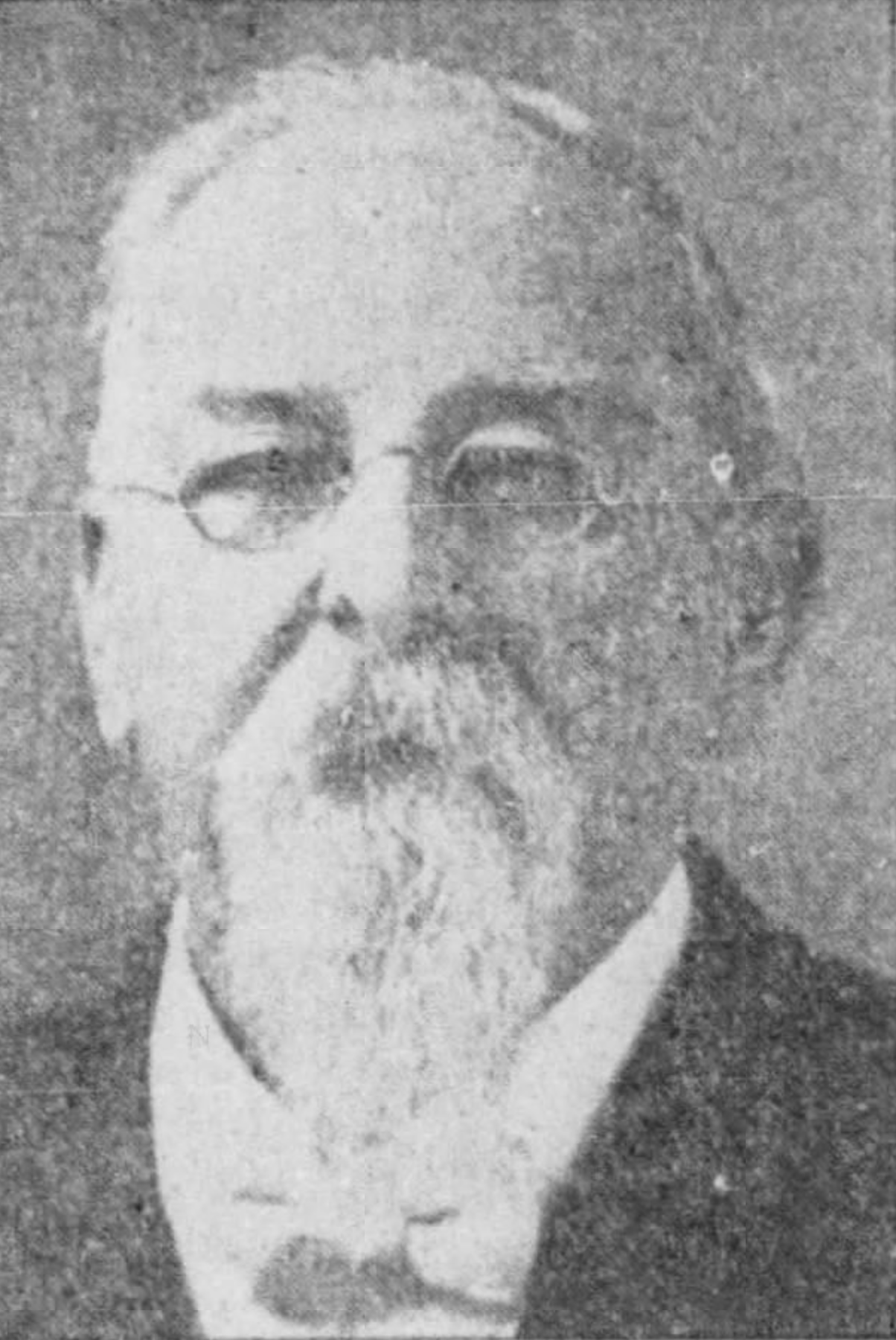
- Portrait from Vernon County Censor obituary

Member of the Wisconsin Senate from the 31st district
- In office January 5, 1891 – January 7, 1895
- Preceded by: Thomas A. Dyson
- Succeeded by: James J. McGillivray

Personal details
- Born: April 1, 1837 West Chester, Pennsylvania, U.S.
- Died: June 7, 1918 (aged 81) Snell Hospital, Viroqua, Wisconsin, U.S.
- Resting place: Viroqua Cemetery, Viroqua, Wisconsin
- Party: Democratic; Republican (before 1890)
- Spouse: Amanda M. Bransby (m. 1857; died 1908)
- Children: Mary Loxly (Keen) (Thompson); John Henry Conner; Henry John Conner
- Occupation: Hotel & restaurant operator

Military service
- Allegiance: United States
- Branch/service: United States Volunteers; Union Army
- Years of service: 1861–1865
- Rank: Captain, USV
- Unit: 17th Reg. Penn. Vol. Infantry; 118th Reg. Penn. Vol. Infantry
- Battles/wars: American Civil War

Henry Conner (April 1, 1837 – June 7, 1918) was an American hotelier, restaurateur, and politician. He was a member of the Wisconsin State Senate, representing Vernon and La Crosse counties during the 1891 and 1893 sessions. Earlier, he served as a Union Army officer during the American Civil War, and lost his right leg due to wounds. His last name was sometimes spelled Connor. (Note: Several obituaries spelled his name "Connor", whereas the 1893 Blue Book and his gravestone spelled his name "Conner".)

== Early life ==
Conner was born on April 1, 1837, in West Chester, Pennsylvania. His father died shortly after he was born, his mother remarried and he was raised at the home of his step-father until he was about fourteen years old, receiving a liberal education.

At age 14, he went to work a team of mules on the Erie Canal, but returned home after three years and apprenticed as a paper-strainer under his step-father, who then had an extensive business in that industry. A few years later, however, his step-father was ruined by the Panic of 1857, and Henry went to work for the Pennsylvania Central Railroad.

In 1858, he cast his first vote for Republican Alexander Henry, in his first campaign for mayor of Philadelphia. After winning the race, Mayor Henry appointed Conner as a fireman in the city's water department.

== Civil War service ==
In April 1861, as reports arrived of the attack on Fort Sumter, Conner quit his job with the city and volunteered for service with the Union Army. He was enrolled as a private in Company C of the 17th Pennsylvania Infantry Regiment on a three-month enlistment.

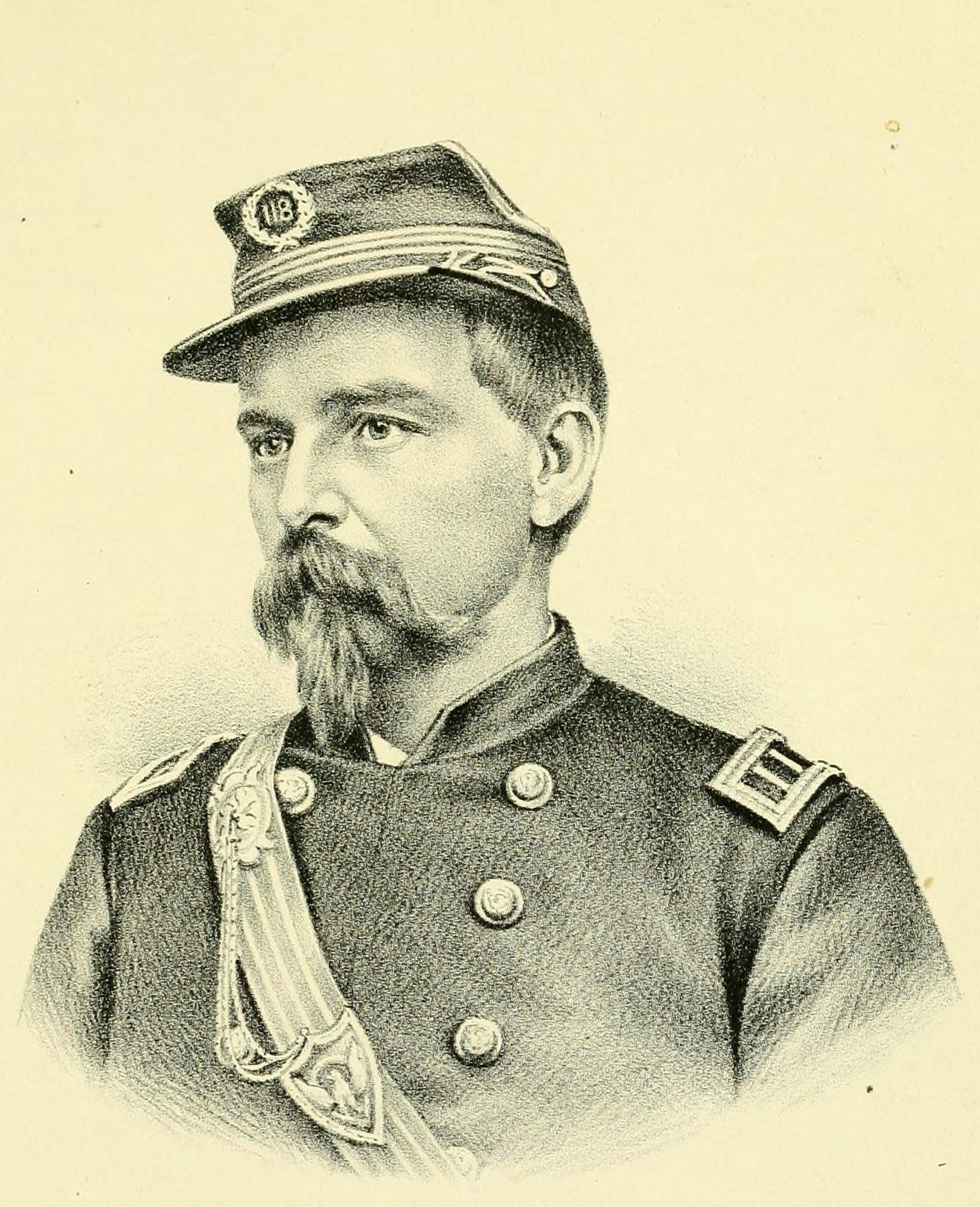
Woodcarving of Conner in his captain's uniform from History of Vernon County, Wisconsin (1884)

His enlistment expired in August and he briefly returned to his previous job in Philadelphia. Mayor Henry was replaced by a Democrat in the 1861 election, however, and Conner lost his role. The Republican-controlled gas department in the city, however, offered him a new job, where he remained for nine months.

In August 1862, he resigned again in order to return to the Union Army. He was enrolled as a private in Company G of the 118th Pennsylvania Infantry Regiment, but was immediately promoted to sergeant as the regiment was being organized. The regiment mustered into service August 30 and proceeded south to Washington, D.C., where they were attached to the Army of the Potomac.

He served in many of the significant battles of the eastern theater of the war, beginning with the Battle of Antietam, less than three weeks after they mustered into service. He was promoted to first sergeant in the midst of the Fredericksburg campaign in January 1863, and subsequently served at the Battle of Gettysburg.

In January 1864, he was commissioned as second lieutenant of Company C. In that capacity, he was wounded in the face and neck at the Battle of Poplar Springs Church in the Richmond–Petersburg campaign. He missed only six weeks to recuperate, and, on his return, he was promoted to first lieutenant for Company H. He was designated for promotion to captain of Company E on March 28, 1865, but was severely wounded three days later in the Battle of Gravely Run. His right leg had to be amputated above the knee and he spent the next seven months in a hospital.

== Postbellum years ==
While recuperating in the hospital, he mustered out of federal service and received a new appointment from the Philadelphia gas department as chief weightmaster. In the Fall of 1866, he was nominated by the Republican Party for the office of city commissioner and won the October municipal election. He served a three year term and then returned to employment with the Pennsylvania Central Railroad Company for four years.

In 1878, he visited his daughter at Boscobel, Wisconsin, and became enamored with the area. He immediately leased the Park Hotel in the nearby city of Viroqua, Wisconsin, and operated the hotel for more than a decade.

He switched his allegiance to the Democratic Party and was nominated for Wisconsin State Senate in 1890. He won in the Democratic wave election in Wisconsin in 1890, assisted by backlash against the passage of the anti-immigrant Bennett Law in the previous session. He represented the 31st State Senate district, which then comprised Vernon and La Crosse counties. Conner was part of the Democratic majority which repealed the law in 1891.

Conner was not a candidate for re-election in 1894, and was subsequently hired as a messenger in the United States Senate, serving two years. He largely retired in 1898.

He died at Snell Hospital in Viroqua on June 7, 1918, after a long period of poor health.

== Personal life ==
In 1857, Conner married Amanda M. Bransby of Philadelphia, with whom he had three children, Mary, John, and Henry, of whom only Mary survived her father. Amanda Conner died in 1908, after an illness.

== Electoral history ==
=== Wisconsin Senate (1890) ===
Wisconsin Senate, 31st District Election, 1890
Party	Candidate	Votes	%	±%
General Election, November 4, 1890
Democratic	Henry Conner	4,972	50.40%	+27.11%
Republican	B. E. Edwards	4,894	49.60%	+8.04%
Plurality		78	0.79%	-10.09%
Total votes		9,866	100.0%	+27.11%
Democratic gain from Republican				

== Notes ==
Wisconsin Senate
Preceded by Thomas A. Dyson	Member of the Wisconsin Senate from the 31st district January 5, 1891 – January 7, 1895	Succeeded by James J. McGillivray
