= John Stoddard =

John Stoddard may refer to:

- John Fair Stoddard (1825–1873), American educator and writer
- John Lawson Stoddard (1850–1931), American writer
- John Williams Stoddard (1837–1917), American manufacturer of agricultural implements and automobiles
- John Stoddard (businessman) (1809–1879), American merchant and planter

== See also ==
- Jonathan Stoddard (1807–1855), American lawyer
- John Stoddard Cancer Center, Des Moines, Iowa
- John Stoddart (disambiguation)
