= Slupecki =

Slupecki or Słupecki is a surname. Notable people with the surname include:

- Edward I. Slupecki (1863–?), American politician
- Jerzy Słupecki (1904–1987), Polish mathematician and logician

== See also ==
- Słupca County
