= John M. Stack =

American politician

John Michael Stack (April 27, 1852 – May 10, 1927) was an American farmer, insurance agent, and politician.

Born in the town of Forest, Fond du Lac County, Wisconsin, Stack went to the local schools. He was a farmer and insurance agent. He served on the Osceola Town Board and on the Osceola School Board. Stack also served on the Fond du Lac Board of Supervisors. In 1893, Stack served in the Wisconsin State Assembly as a Democrat. In 1923, Stack and his wife moved to Fond du Lac, Wisconsin. He died at his home in Fond du Lac, Wisconsin.

Stack was the brother of Stephen Sylvester Stack (1858–1932), a prominent Milwaukee physician, and James Langford Stack (1873–1928), a wealthy advertising agency owner, as well as the uncle of the actor Robert Stack (1919–2003).
