= Graham Corners, Wisconsin =

- Unincorporated community
- Location within Wisconsin Location within the United States
- Coordinates: 43°43′57″N 88°10′30″W
- Country: United States
- State: Wisconsin
- County: Fond du Lac
- Named for: Allen N. Graham- first postmaster
- Elevation: 1,050 ft (320 m)
- Time zone: UTC-6 (Central (CST))
  - Summer (DST): UTC-5 (CDT)
- Area code: 920
- GNIS feature ID: 1565705

Graham Corners is an unincorporated community located in the town of Forest, Fond du Lac County, Wisconsin, United States. The community was named after Allen N. Graham, who became the first postmaster in October 1900.
