= Peter Loehr (politician) =

American politician (1831–1899)

Peter Loehr (March 7, 1831 – February 9, 1899) was a member of the Wisconsin State Assembly.

== Biography ==
Loehr was born on March 7, 1831, in what is now Thalheim, Germany. He immigrated to the United States in 1855. After residing in Milwaukee, Wisconsin, he settled in Dotyville, Wisconsin, in 1858. He died on February 9, 1899, in Forest, Fond du Lac County, Wisconsin. Reports have differed on the location.

== Career ==
Loehr was elected to the Assembly in 1888. In addition, he was chairman (similar to mayor) of Forest. He was a Democrat.
