= Dornburg, Hesse =

Dornburg
- Municipality
- Flag Coat of arms

- Location of Dornburg within Limburg-Weilburg district
- Interactive map of Dornburg
- Location within Germany Location within Hesse
- Coordinates: 50°30′13″N 08°01′28″E
- Country: Germany
- State: Hesse
- Admin. region: Gießen
- District: Limburg-Weilburg

Government
  - Mayor (2021–27): Andreas Höfner (CDU)

Area
  - Total: 33.21 km^{2} (12.82 sq mi)
- Elevation: 194 m (636 ft)

Population (2025-12-31)
  - Total: 8,405
  - Density: 253.1/km^{2} (655.5/sq mi)
- Time zone: UTC+01:00 (CET)
  - Summer (DST): UTC+02:00 (CEST)
- Postal codes: 65599
- Dialling codes: 06436
- Vehicle registration: LM, WEL
- Website: www.gemeinde-dornburg.de

Dornburg (German pronunciation: [ˈdɔʁnbʊʁk]) is a municipality in the Westerwald in Limburg-Weilburg district in Hesse (German: Hessen), Germany.

== Geography ==
=== Neighbouring communities ===
Dornburg borders in the north and west on communities in the Westerwaldkreis in Rhineland-Palatinate, with the other neighbours all lying in Limburg-Weilburg. Among them is the town of Hadamar, historically the seat of a county.

=== Constituent communities ===
Dornburg’s Ortsteile are Frickhofen (administrative seat; celebrates its 1,200-year jubilee in 2009), Langendernbach, Dorndorf (state-recognized health resort), Thalheim and Wilsenroth (state-recognized air spa)

== History ==
The "Dornburg", which gave the community its name after its forerunner communities were amalgamated in 1974, is a roughly 396-m-high elevation upon which are found the remains of a ringwall site from La Tène times (5th to 1st century BC). Within it lay a Celtic settlement rather like a town. On the Blasiusberg was a heathen worship place. The Christian chapel built there later served until 1734 as the parish church for eleven of the area’s villages.

The founding of the five villages that now make up the community of Dornburg goes back in some cases more than 1,200 years. Wilsenroth had its first documentary mention in 879 under the name Welsenderode – meaning the area cleared by Willesind – as did also Langendernbach when Count Gebhard in the Lahngau donated property here to the St. Severus Monastery in Gemünden.

Dorndorf’s first documentary mention under the name Torndorph stems from the year 772. Frickhofen (Fridechuba, roughly estate surrounded by peace) was founded sometime between 802 and 812.

In 1636, the Plague ravaged Dornburg. In Dorndorf only a single family survived.

Within the framework of administrative reform in Hesse on 1 February 1971, the community of Dornburg came into being through the amalgamation of the formerly autonomous villages of Frickhofen, Dorndorf and Wilsenroth, and then shortly thereafter Thalheim as well. Langendernbach left amalgamation to the last possible moment, the deadline on 1 July 1974. It nevertheless joined the community.

== Politics ==
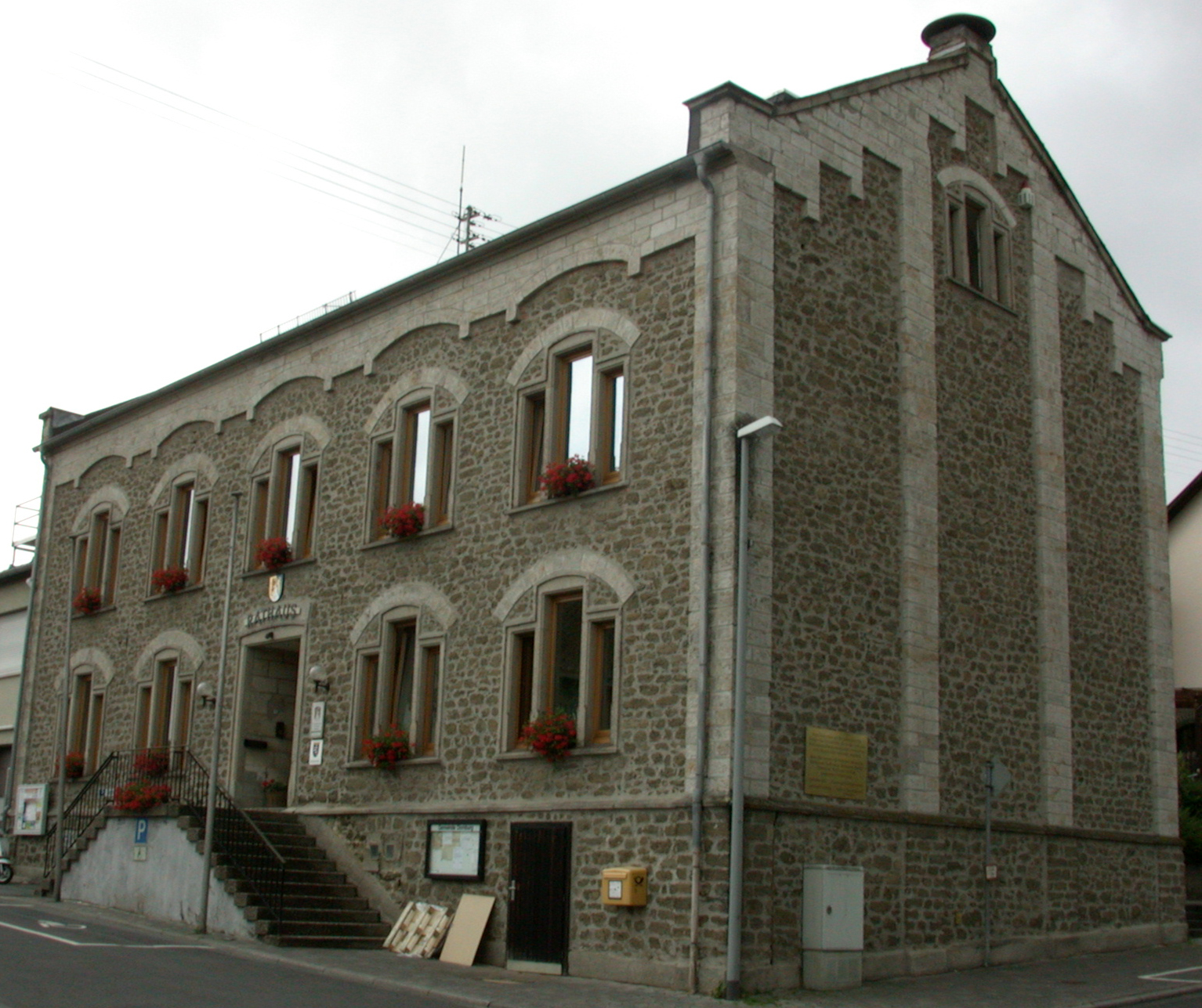
Dornburg town hall in Frickhofen

=== Community council ===
The municipal election held on 26 March 2006 yielded the following results:

Parties and voter communities		% 2006	seats 2006	% 2001	seats 2001
CDU	Christian Democratic Union of Germany	61.7	19	55.1	17
SPD	Social Democratic Party of Germany	24.1	8	27.0	8
FWG Dornburg	Freie Wählergemeinschaft Dornburg	14.2	4	10.3	3
DBL	Dornburger Bürgerliste	–	–	7.7	3
Total		100.0	31	100.0	31
Voter turnout in %		51.2		60.8	

=== Community executive ===
The Gemeindevorstand consists of the mayor (Bürgermeister) and 10 deputies (Beigeordneten). Here, too, the CDU currently holds an absolute majority.

=== Mayor ===
Dornburg’s mayor is Andreas Höfner (CDU).

== Sightseeing ==
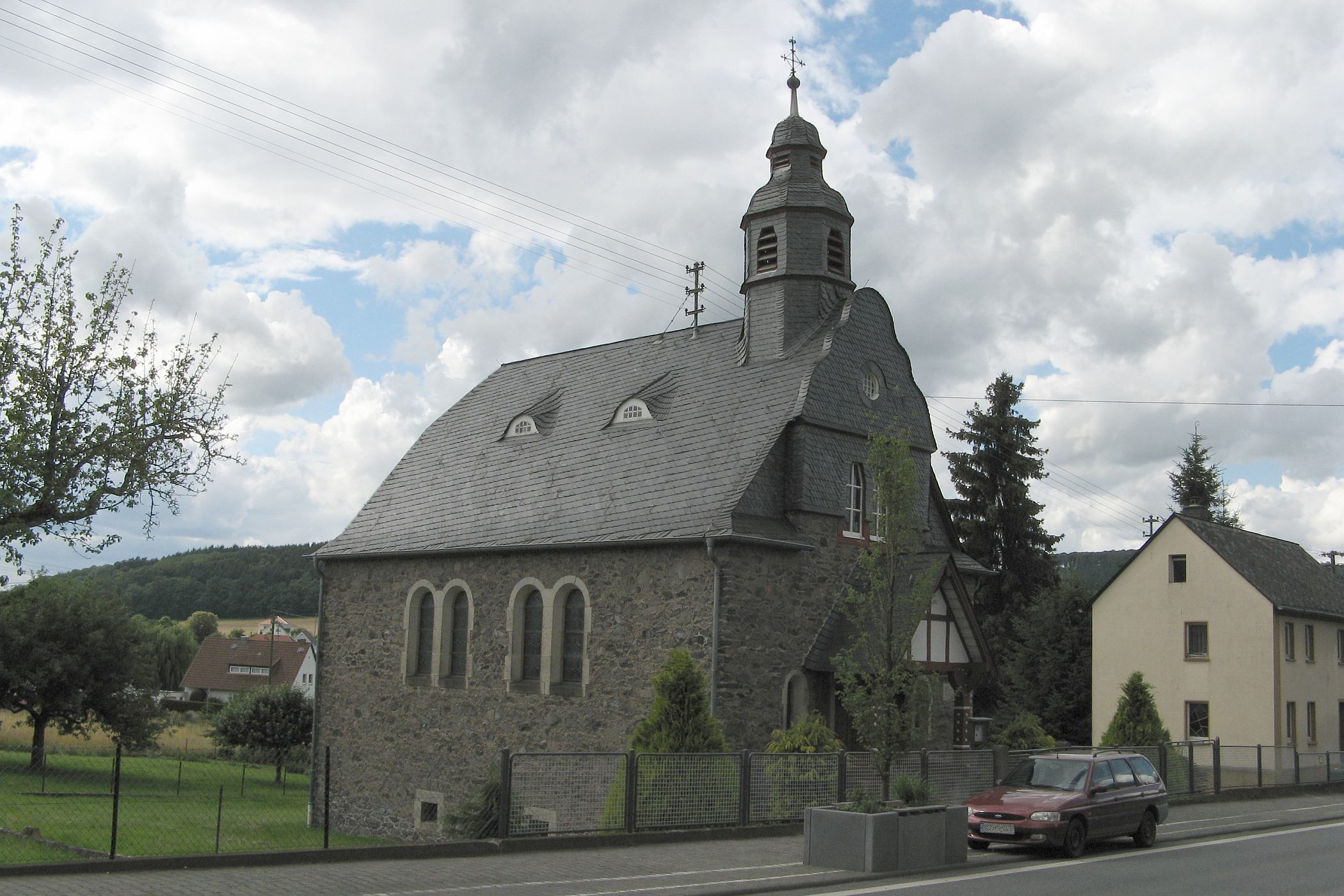
The Baroque Evangelical church in Langendernbach

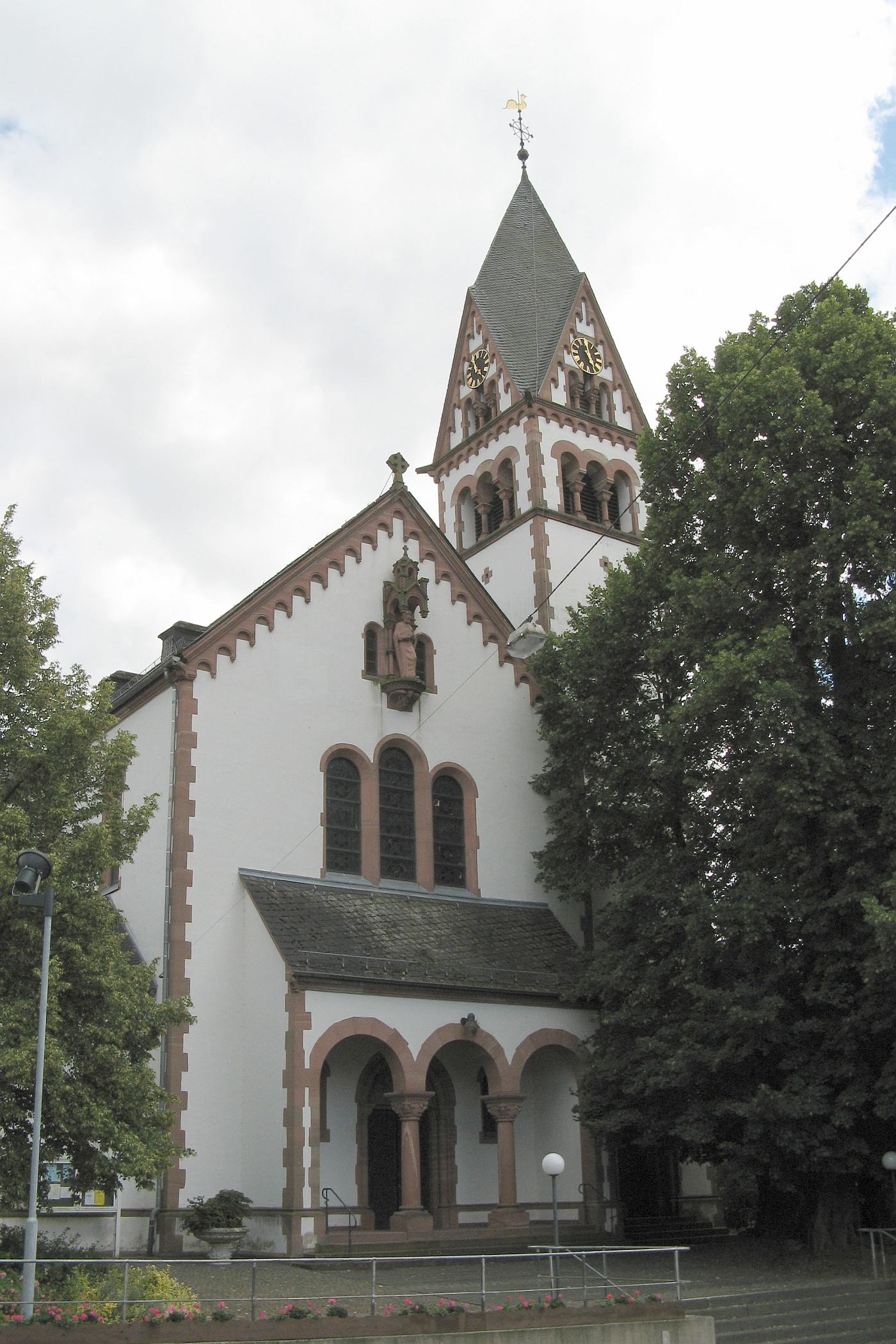
St. Matthew’s Church in Langendernbach with the “800-year-old lime”

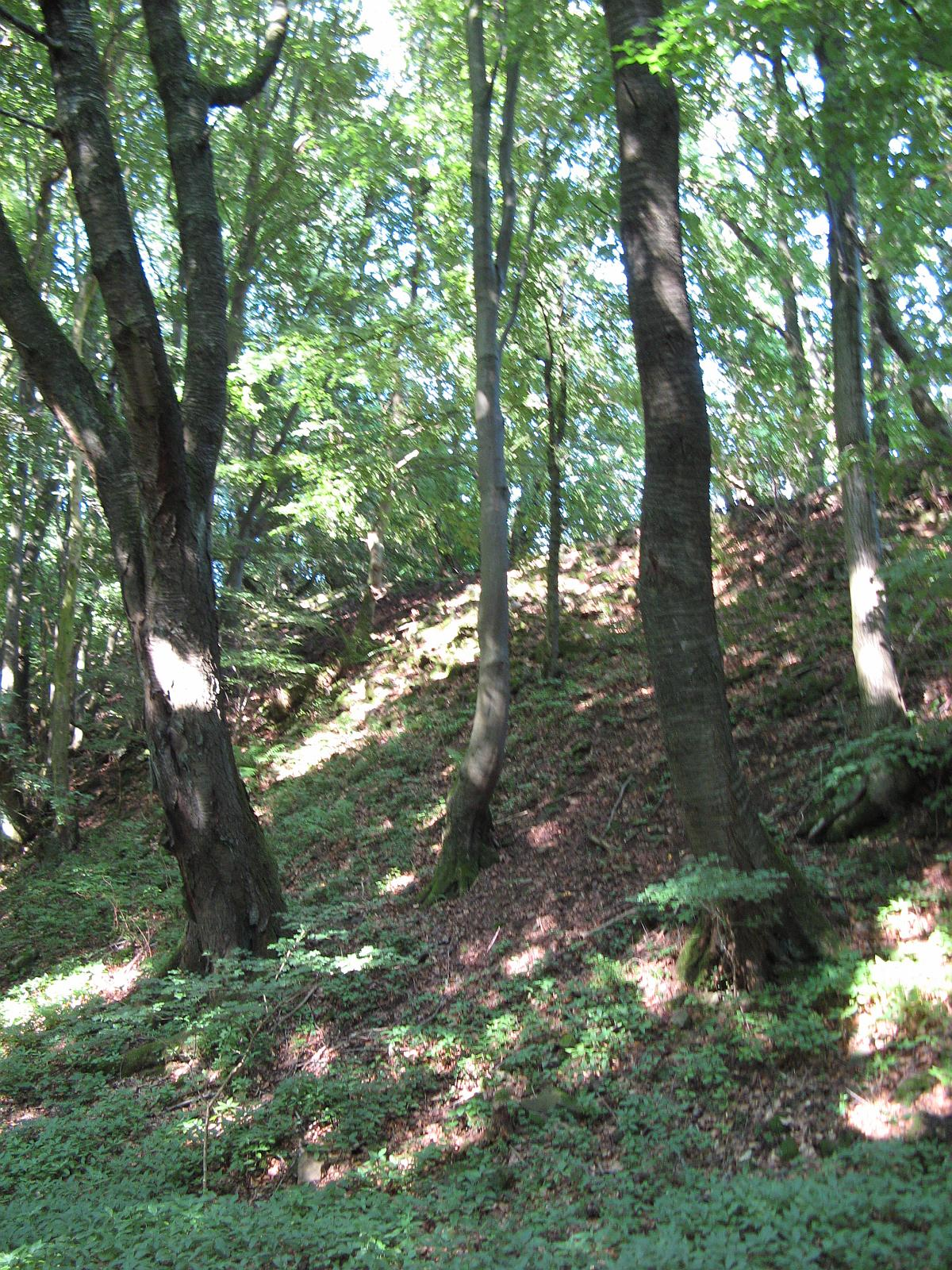
Remains of the Rödchensmauer, the Dornburg circular rampartl

- The Blasiuskapelle, first mentioned about 803, in Frickhofen’s community area, was until 1746 the midpoint of the parish of Frickhofen. The chapel was consecrated to the Archangel Michael.
- The Parish Church at Frickhofen was built in 1732. From the original church only the steeple and the quire have been preserved. These parts of the building were expanded in 1955 and 1956 to make the church bigger. The church has at its disposal a great Baroque altar of the Hadamar school.
- The neo-Romanesque Pfarrkirche St. Matthias (St. Matthew’s Parish Church) stands at Langendernbach along with its “800-year-old linden”.
- The Pfarrkirche St. Margaretha Dorndorf (St. Margaret’s Parish Church, Dorndorf) is built on the foundations of a castle tower from the 10th century.
- The Hofhaus in Langendernbach
- Jewish cemetery in Frickhofen’s community area
- Memorial to victims of both World Wars in Wilsenroth
- Local history museum in Wilsenroth
- The “Dornburg” with remains of an old Celtic oppidum with a circular rampart
- The Ewiges Eis (“Everlasting Ice”) at the foot of the Dornburg in Frickhofen`s community area. Here air currents under the mountain’s loose basalt scree in the winter freeze moisture into ice. The air is thereby dried and warmed, rises and keeps the upper surface of the scree slope snowless. In summer the air current shifts and warm air from above flows into the slope, is sharply cooled and comes out the bottom end as a cold air current. The good isolation through the basalt scree ensures that the layer of ice, which can reach up to eight metres in depth in the ground, never quite thaws even in summer. This phenomenon is unique in Hesse. It was discovered in 1839 by basalt quarrymen. Today it can be viewed from two man-made galleries originally built by a brewery in 1869 as a cool place to store beer.

== Culture ==
In Dornburg there are various cultural offerings, mostly under the responsibility of local clubs. There is also a village museum in Wilsenroth that affords the visitor a glimpse of the local history and a chance to remember or learn what it was like to live, work and celebrate festivals in a Westerwald village in days of yore.

=== Further reading (culture) ===
- Mützel - Der kleine Hase (Mützel - the Little Jackrabbit): Thomas Stähler (2. Tenor of the „Ohrenschmaus“ Frickhofen singing group.)
- St. Martinskirche Frickhofen - 50 Jahre; Publisher: St. Martin Parish, Author: Stefan Grüssinger

== Economy and infrastructure ==
=== Transport ===
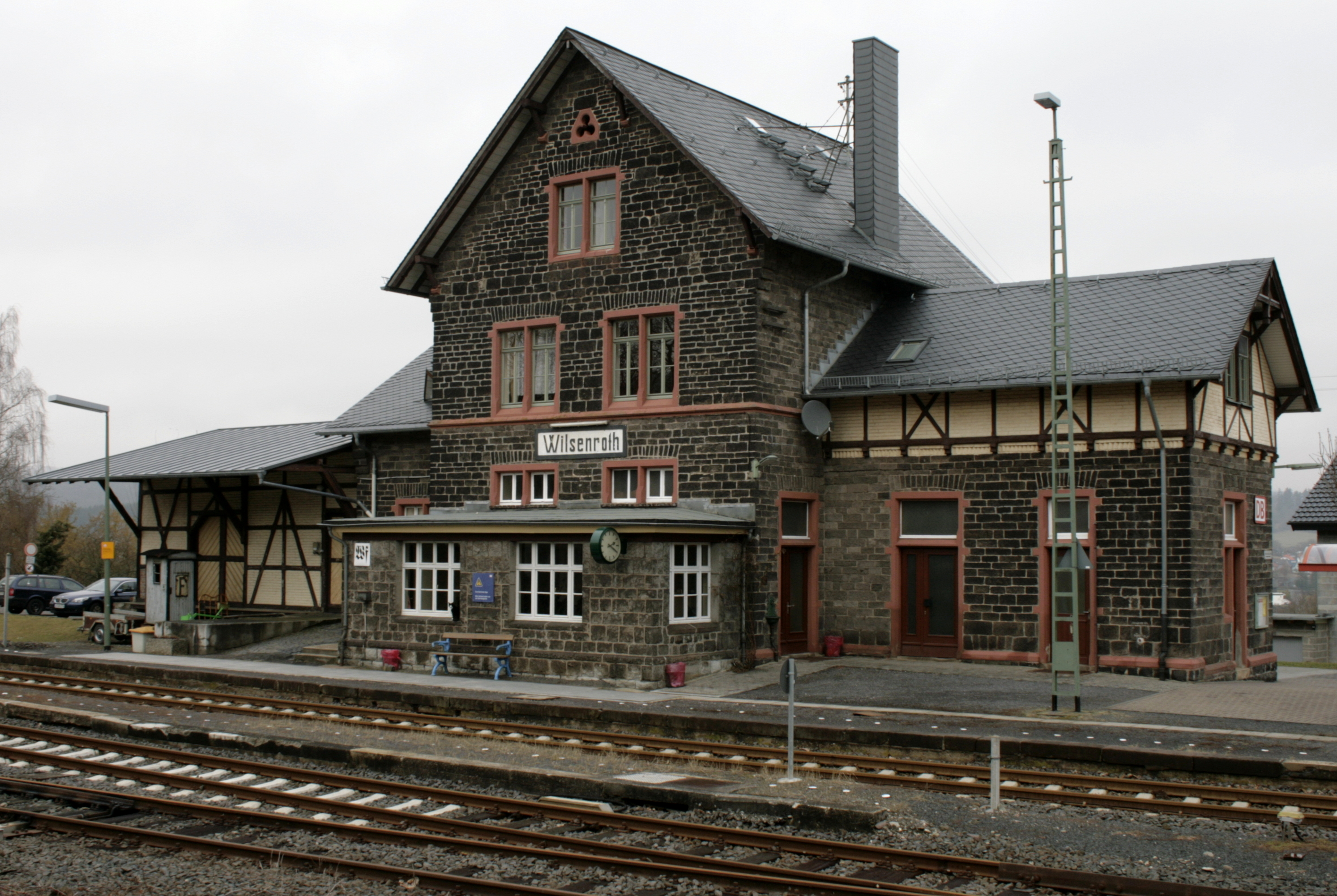
Wilsenroth station

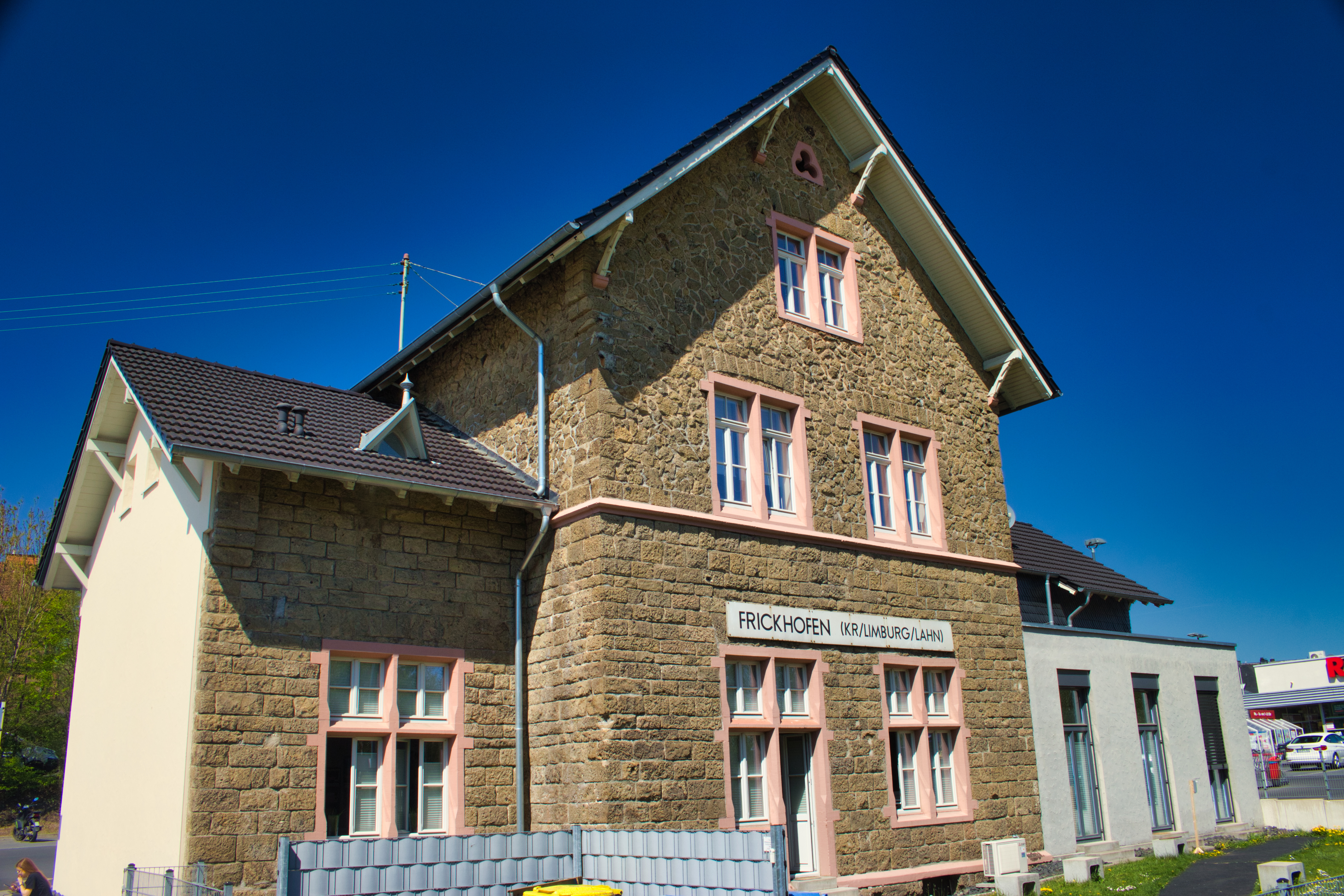
Frickhofen station

The train stations Frickhofen and Wilsenroth are located in Dornburg at the line number RB90 (Westerwald-Sieg-railway (Limburg (Lahn) - Diez Ost - Westerburg - Nistertal-Bad Marienberg - Hachenburg - Altenkirchen - Au (Sieg) - Wissen - Kirchen (Sieg) - Siegen, served by Hessische Landesbahn, section DreiLänderBahn.

Wilsenroth station has a park and ride lot for all train users as well.

Dornburg is located in the zone number 6060 of the transport association Rhein-Main-Verkehrsverbund (RMV) and the zone number 172 of the transport association Verkehrsverbund Rhein-Mosel (VRM). Through Langendernbach runs Bundesstraße 54 (Siegen - Limburg).

=== Education ===
In Dornburg there are primary schools in the constituent communities of Dorndorf, Langendernbach, Thalheim and Wilsenroth. Frickhofen is home to the Mittelpunktschule St. Blasius with primary school, Hauptschule and Realschule sections.

=== Public institutions ===
- Frickhofen Catholic Kindergarten
- Langendernbach Catholic Kindergarten
- Wilsenroth Catholic Kindergarten
- Dorndorf Catholic Kindergarten
- Thalheim Catholic Kindergarten
- Frickhofen Volunteer Fire Brigade, founded 1895
- Langendernbach Volunteer Fire Brigade, founded 1897
- Wilsenroth Volunteer Fire Brigade, founded 1928
- Dorndorf Volunteer Fire Brigade, founded 1928
- Thalheim Volunteer Fire Brigade, founded 1909

== Notable people ==
Notable people who were born or lived in Dornburg include:

- Peter Loehr (1831–1899), American politician from Thalheim
