= Clyman (town), Wisconsin =

Town in Dodge County, Wisconsin, United States

Clyman, Wisconsin
- Town
- Town of Clyman
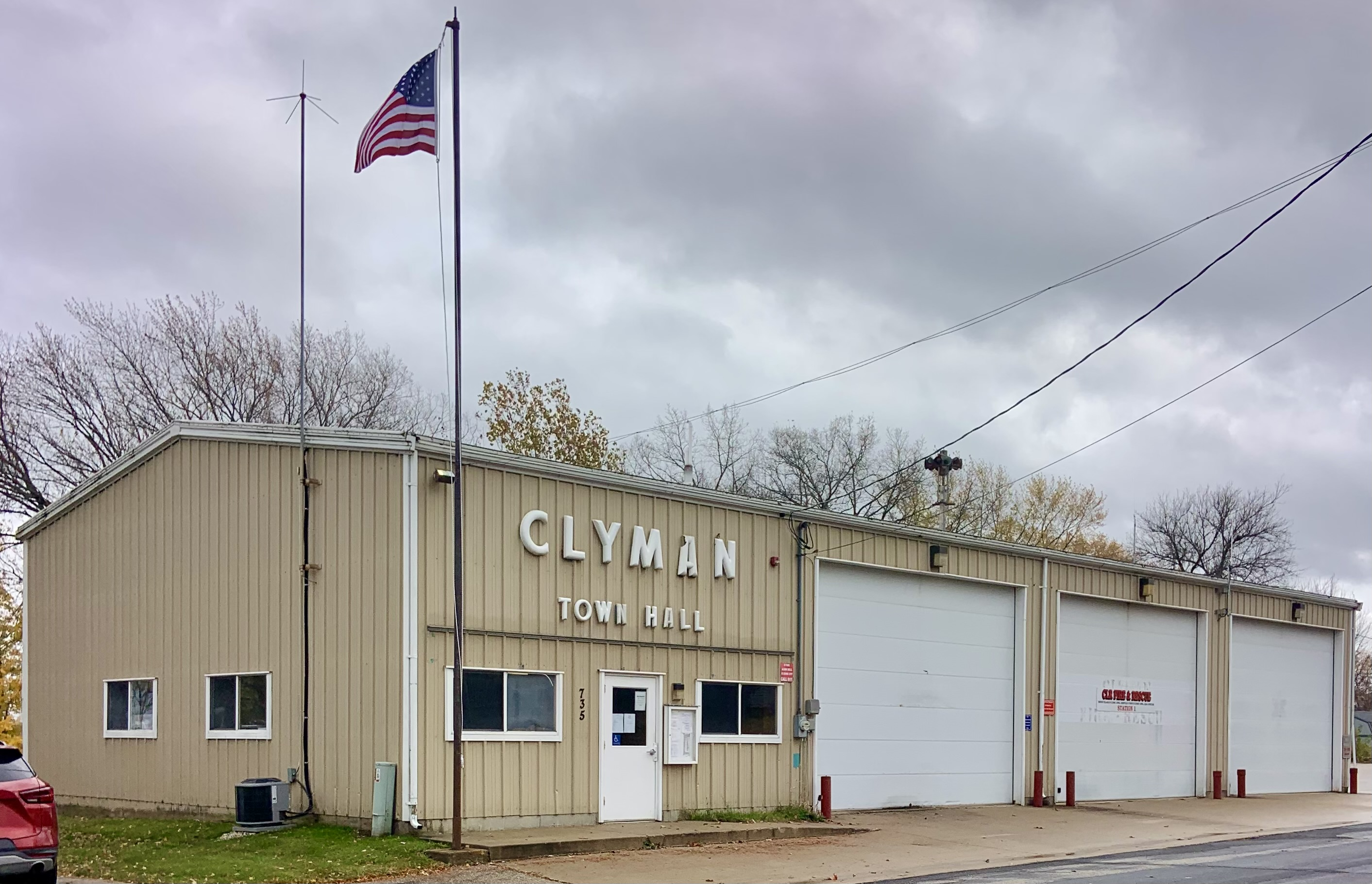
- Clyman Town Hall

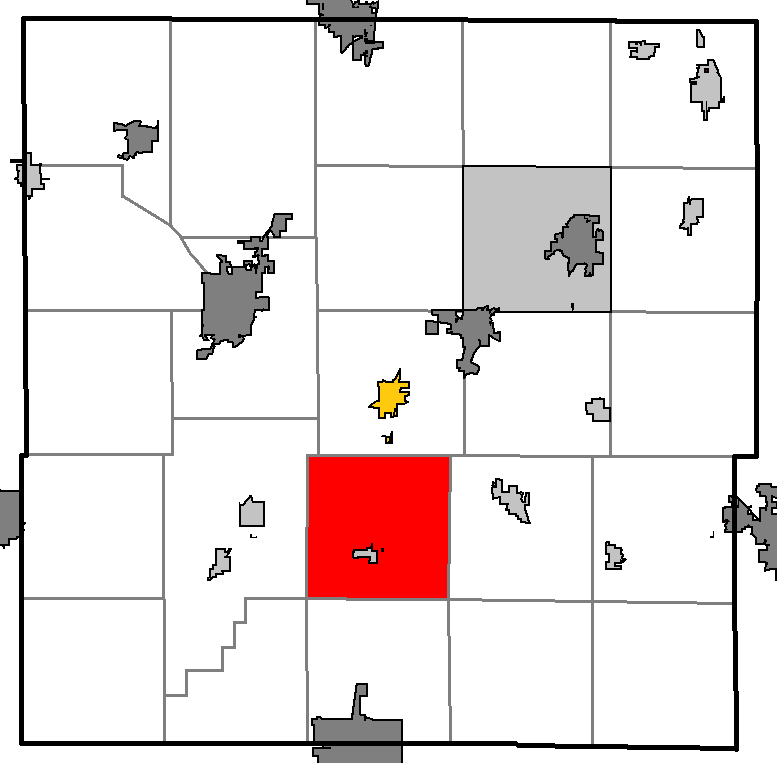
- Location of Clyman, within Dodge County
- Coordinates: 43°19′40″N 88°42′33″W
- Country: United States
- State: Wisconsin
- County: Dodge

Area
  - Total: 35.27 sq mi (91.3 km^{2})
  - Land: 35.21 sq mi (91.2 km^{2})
  - Water: 0.06 sq mi (0.16 km^{2})

Population (2020)
  - Total: 712
  - Density: 20.2/sq mi (7.81/km^{2})
- Time zone: UTC-6 (Central (CST))
  - Summer (DST): UTC-5 (CDT)
- Area code(s): 920 & 274
- GNIS feature ID: 1582992

Clyman is a town in Dodge County, Wisconsin, United States. The population was 712 at the 2020 census. The Village of Clyman is located within the town. The unincorporated community of Clyman Junction is also located in the town of Clyman.

== Geography ==
According to the United States Census Bureau, the town has a total area of 35.4 square miles (91.7 km^{2}), of which 35.4 square miles (91.7 km^{2}) is land and 0.04 square mile (0.1 km^{2}) (0.06%) is water.

== Demographics ==
As of the census of 2000, there were 849 people, 290 households, and 236 families living in the town. The population density was 24.0 people per square mile (9.3/km^{2}). There were 309 housing units at an average density of 8.7 per square mile (3.4/km^{2}). The racial makeup of the town was 97.64% White, 0.12% Native American, 0.71% Asian, 0.82% from other races, and 0.71% from two or more races. 2.12% of the population were Hispanic or Latino of any race.

There were 290 households, out of which 38.6% had children under the age of 18 living with them, 72.4% were married couples living together, 5.9% had a female householder with no husband present, and 18.6% were non-families. 13.4% of all households were made up of individuals, and 5.5% had someone living alone who was 65 years of age or older. The average household size was 2.93 and the average family size was 3.22.

In the town, the population was spread out, with 28.4% under the age of 18, 7.8% from 18 to 24, 29.3% from 25 to 44, 24.4% from 45 to 64, and 10.1% who were 65 years of age or older. The median age was 36 years. For every 100 females, there were 109.1 males. For every 100 females age 18 and over, there were 105.4 males.

The median income for a household in the town was $48,462, and the median income for a family was $55,341. Males had a median income of $30,982 versus $25,096 for females. The per capita income for the town was $20,102. About 2.9% of families and 4.8% of the population were below the poverty line, including 2.8% of those under age 18 and 10.3% of those age 65 or over.

== Notable people ==
- Eugene A. Clifford, Wisconsin State Senator (1931–1934)
- Patrick Clifford, member of the Wisconsin State Assembly (1889)
- Michael Laffey, member of the Wisconsin State Assembly (1923–1931)
- Oscar Elton Sette, influential 20th-century American fisheries scientist
