= Patrick Clifford (politician) =

American politician

Patrick Clifford was a member of the Wisconsin State Assembly.

== Biography ==
Clifford was born on December 19, 1854. After residing for a time in Clyman, Wisconsin, he moved to Marinette in 1871.

== Career ==
Clifford was elected to the Assembly in 1888. Previously, he had been elected Sheriff of Marinette in 1886. Clifford was a Democrat.
