= Forest, Fond du Lac County, Wisconsin =

Forest, Wisconsin
- Town
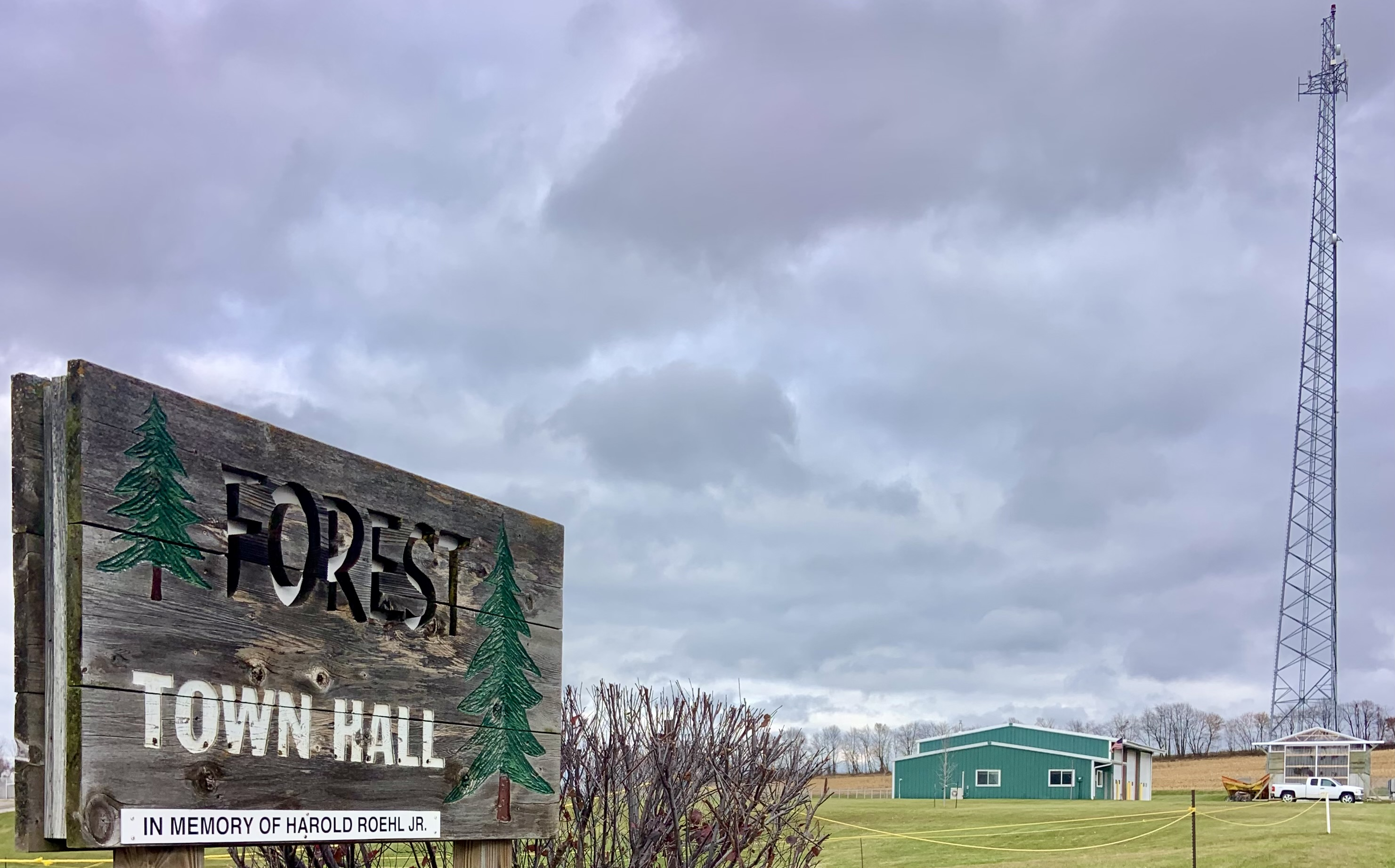
- Town hall

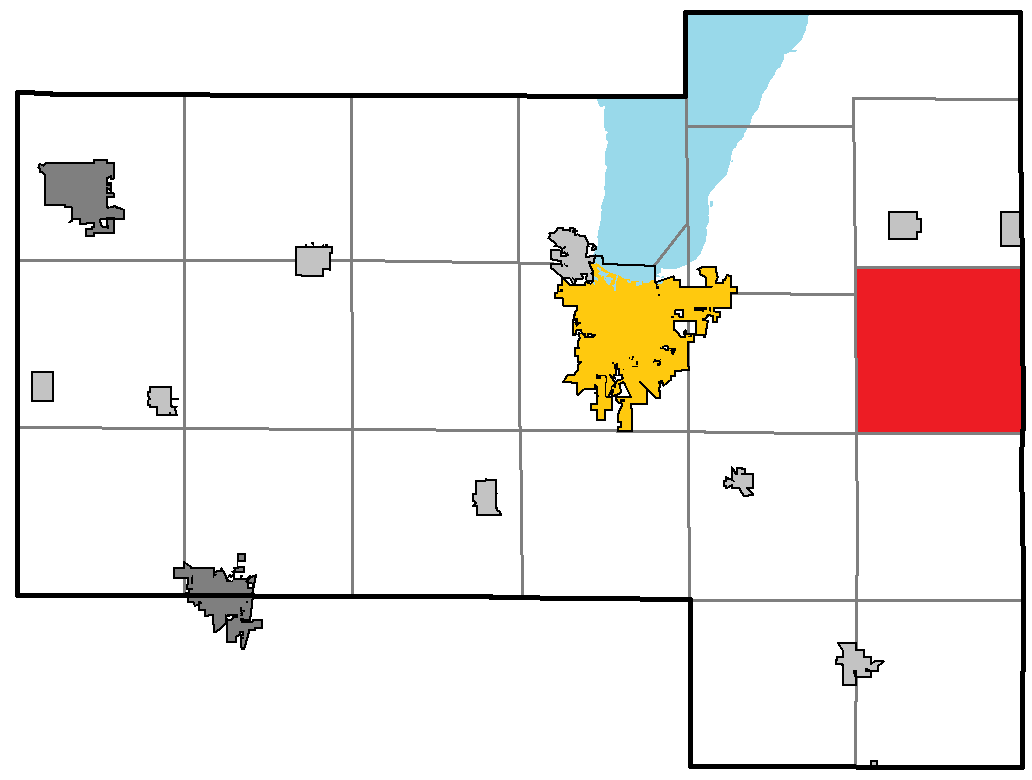
- Location of Forest, within Fond du Lac County
- Coordinates: 43°46′7″N 88°13′33″W
- Country: United States
- State: Wisconsin
- County: Fond du Lac

Area
  - Total: 36.1 sq mi (93.5 km^{2})
  - Land: 35.3 sq mi (91.3 km^{2})
  - Water: 0.85 sq mi (2.2 km^{2})
- Elevation: 1,014 ft (309 m)

Population (2020)
  - Total: 975
  - Density: 27.7/sq mi (10.7/km^{2})
- Time zone: UTC-6 (Central (CST))
  - Summer (DST): UTC-5 (CDT)
- Area code: 920
- FIPS code: 55-26450
- GNIS feature ID: 1583213

Forest is a town in Fond du Lac County, Wisconsin, United States. The population was 975 at the 2020 census. The unincorporated communities of Banner, Dotyville, and Graham Corners are located in the town.

== Geography ==
According to the United States Census Bureau, the town has a total area of 36.1 square miles (93 km^{2}), of which 35.2 square miles (91 km^{2}) is land and 0.9 square miles (2.3 km^{2}) (2.41%) is water.

== Demographics ==
As of the census of 2000, there were 1,108 people, 397 households, and 306 families residing in the town. The population density was 31.4 people per square mile (12.1/km^{2}). There were 410 housing units at an average density of 11.6 per square mile (4.5/km^{2}). The racial makeup of the town was 98.38% White, 0.45% Native American, 0.09% Asian, 0.54% from other races, and 0.54% from two or more races. Hispanic or Latino of any race were 0.81% of the population.

There were 397 households, out of which 35.0% had children under the age of 18 living with them, 70.0% were married couples living together, 5.0% had a female householder with no husband present, and 22.7% were non-families. 18.9% of all households were made up of individuals, and 9.3% had someone living alone who was 65 years of age or older. The average household size was 2.79 and the average family size was 3.22.

In the town, the population was spread out, with 27.8% under the age of 18, 6.9% from 18 to 24, 29.3% from 25 to 44, 23.9% from 45 to 64, and 12.0% who were 65 years of age or older. The median age was 37 years. For every 100 females, there were 109.1 males. For every 100 females age 18 and over, there were 116.8 males.

The median income for a household in the town was $49,583, and the median income for a family was $55,469. Males had a median income of $36,298 versus $26,250 for females. The per capita income for the town was $19,848. About 2.3% of families and 3.3% of the population were below the poverty line, including 2.6% of those under age 18 and 2.9% of those age 65 or over.

== Notable people ==
- Charles A. Corbett, Wisconsin State Representative and businessman
- Peter Loehr, Wisconsin State Representative and farmer
- Peter McGalloway, Wisconsin State Representative and farmer
- John M. Stack, Wisconsin State Representative and farmer
