= Evan Coolidge =

American politician

Evan Coolidge was a member of the Wisconsin State Assembly. A Republican, he was elected to the Assembly in 1888. In addition, he was County Treasurer of Waupaca County, Wisconsin, originally elected in 1863. Coolidge was born on May 27, 1838, in Philadelphia, New York.
