= Frank E. Woller =

American politician

Frank E. Woller (1859–1941) was a member of the Wisconsin State Assembly.

== Biography ==
Woller was born on February 15, 1859, in Milwaukee, Wisconsin. On September 25, 1881, he married Caroline Ebert (1860–1937). Woller was a Lutheran. In 1930, he was working as timekeeper at an iron foundry. Woller died at the age of 71 and was interred on January 8, 1941, with his wife at the Lincoln Memorial Cemetery in Milwaukee.

== Career ==
Woller was elected to the Assembly in 1888. Other positions he held include Milwaukee alderman from 1887 to 1888. He was a Republican.
