= John Fair Stoddard =

American educator and author

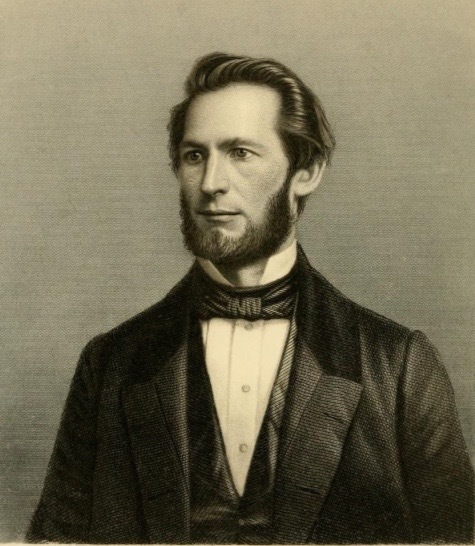
John Fair Stoddard

John Fair Stoddard (July 20, 1825 – August 6, 1873) was an American educator and author.

Stoddard was born in Greenfield, New York.

His early years were passed on a farm, and, after attending the public schools, he began teaching in 1843. Later he entered the New York normal school, and upon his graduation in 1847 began his life-work as an educator. He was eminently successful as an instructor of mathematics and in his efforts to promote normal schools, and left a fund to Rochester University for a gold medal, to be awarded to the best student in mathematics.

He served as principal of the Lancaster County Normal School (later Millersville University) from 1855 to 1856 and founded the Susquehanna Company Normal School.

His principal published works are Practical Arithmetic (New York, 1852), Philosophical Arithmetic (1853), University Algebra (1857), and School Arithmetic (1869). The annual sale of Stoddard's arithmetics was at one time about 200,000 copies, now 40,000, and up to July, 1898, over 2,500,000 copies had been issued.

Stoddard died in Kearney, New Jersey.
