= Dotyville, Wisconsin =

- Unincorporated community
- Location within Wisconsin Location within the United States
- Coordinates: 43°45′08″N 88°15′39″W
- Country: United States
- State: Wisconsin
- County: Fond du Lac
- Elevation: 1,027 ft (313 m)
- Time zone: UTC-6 (Central (CST))
  - Summer (DST): UTC-5 (CDT)
- Area code: 920
- GNIS feature ID: 1564077

Dotyville is an unincorporated community located in the town of Forest, Fond du Lac County, Wisconsin, United States. The community was named for James Duane Doty, the first person to represent Wisconsin's third congressional district after statehood and Governor of the Utah Territory during the American Civil War.
