= Walter L. Miller (politician) =

American politician

Walter L. Miller (26 February 1830 – ?) was a member of the Wisconsin State Assembly.

He was born in York County, New Brunswick. Later that year, he moved with his parents to Rushford, Wisconsin. He would own a saw mill and become involved in the lumber industry and would own and captain a steamboat on the Fox River and the Wolf River. In June 1874, Miller married Frances McCabe.

== Political career ==
Miller was elected to the Assembly in 1888. The previous year, he had been elected President (similar to Mayor) of Winneconne, Wisconsin. He was a Republican.
