= Asaph Elston =

American politician

Asaph Clayton Vanderwater Elston (September 9, 1845 – July 28, 1914) was a member of the Wisconsin State Assembly. He was born on September 9, 1845, in Unionville, Orange County, New York. Occupations he held include banker and merchant. He died on July 28, 1914, in Muscoda, Wisconsin. He was elected to the Assembly in 1888 as a Republican.
