= Edward McGlachlin =

American newspaper editor and politician

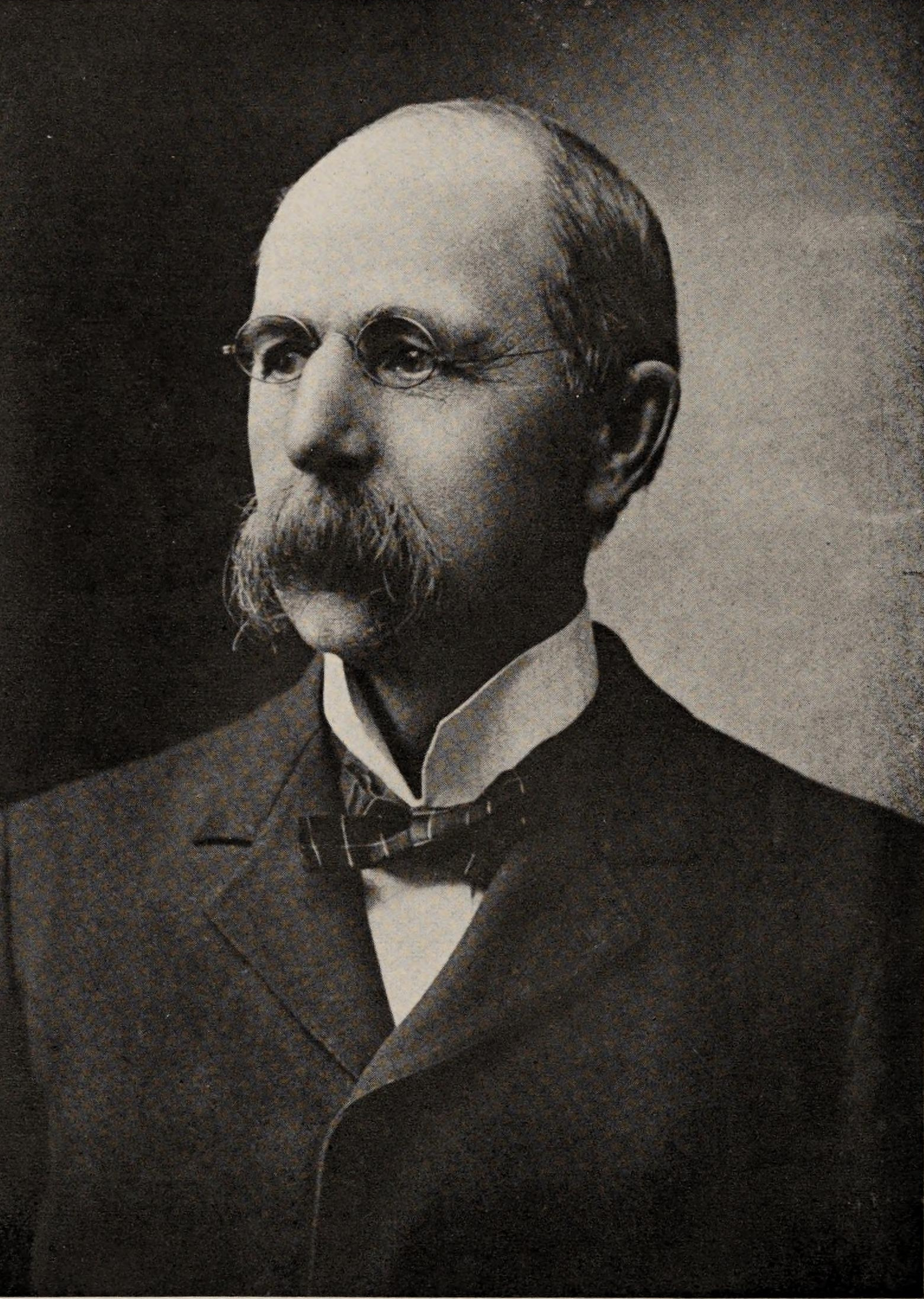
- Portrait from A Standard History of Portage County, Wisconsin (1919)

Member of the Wisconsin State Assembly from the Portage district
- In office January 7, 1889 – January 5, 1891
- Preceded by: Jerome Nelson
- Succeeded by: Charles Couch

Personal details
- Born: December 19, 1840 Watson, New York, U.S.
- Died: April 22, 1931 (aged 90) Stevens Point, Wisconsin, U.S.
- Resting place: Forest Cemetery, Stevens Point, Wisconsin
- Party: Republican
- Spouse: Mary Eliza Lawrence
- Children: Edward F. McGlachlin Jr.; (b. 1868; died 1946)

Military service
- Allegiance: United States
- Branch/service: United States Volunteers; Union Army
- Years of service: 1861–1864
- Rank: Sergeant, USV
- Unit: 1st Reg. Wis. Vol. Infantry
- Battles/wars: American Civil War

Edward Fenton McGlachlin, Sr., (December 19, 1840 – April 22, 1931) was an American newspaper editor and Republican politician. He served one term in the Wisconsin State Assembly, representing Portage County. During the American Civil War he served in the Union Army and was taken prisoner at the Battle of Chickamauga. His son, Edward McGlachlin, Jr., was a distinguished U.S. Army officer and rose to the rank of major general.

== Biography ==
Born in the town of Watson, Lewis County, New York, McGlachlin settled on a farm in Sheboygan County, Wisconsin, in 1857. In 1859, McGlachlin started working as a printer for the Fond du Lac Commonwealth newspaper in Fond du Lac, Wisconsin. During the American Civil War, McGlachlin served in the 1st Wisconsin Infantry Regiment and was promoted to sergeant. After the civil war, McGlachlin worked in the newspaper business in Fond du Lac, Wisconsin, Clinton, Iowa, and Oshkosh, Wisconsin. In 1873, McGlachlin moved to Stevens Point, Wisconsin, and was one of the editors and publishers of the Stevens Point Journal newspaper. In 1885, McGlachlin served on the Stevens Point Board of Education and was the board treasurer. In 1889, McGlachlin served in the Wisconsin State Assembly and was a Republican. He also served as postmaster and on the board of managers for the Grand Army Home for Veterans near Waupaca, Wisconsin. McGlachlin died at his home in Stevens Point, Wisconsin.
