= Peter McGalloway =

American politician

Peter McGalloway (June 14, 1852 – January 25, 1931) was an American farmer and politician.

Born in the town of Forest, Fond du Lac County, Wisconsin, McGalloway was a farmer. He served as the chairman of the Forest Town Board and as town clerk. McGalloway also served on the Fond du Lac County Board of Supervisors. In 1895, McGalloway served in the Wisconsin State Assembly and was a Democrat. In 1902, McGalloway was part of the committee responsible for the new Civil War monument in Fond du Lac. McGalloway died at his home in Fond du Lac, Wisconsin and was memorialized with other legislature members in a resolution in March 1931.
