= Henry Siebers =

Member of Wisconsin State

Henry Siebers was a member of the Wisconsin State Assembly representing the 5th District of Milwaukee County, Wisconsin. A Republican, Siebers was elected in 1888. He was born on October 5, 1844.
