= Charles A. Corbett =

American businessman and politician

Charles A. Corbett (November 21, 1840 – February 18, 1915) was an American businessman and politician.

Born in Benson, Rutland County, Vermont, Corbett and his parents moved to a farm in the town of Greenbush, Wisconsin in 1855. Corbett served in the 8th Wisconsin Volunteer Infantry Regiment during the American Civil War and lost a leg in a battle. Corbett then went to a business school in Milwaukee, Wisconsin and operated a store in the town of Forest, Fond du Lac County, Wisconsin. Corbett then returned to Greenbush, Wisconsin and operated another store. During that time, Corbett served as Greenbush town clerk and town board chairman. He also served in the Wisconsin State Assembly, in 1889, and was a Republican. In 1898, Corbett moved to Plymouth, Wisconsin. He died at his home in Plymouth, Wisconsin.
