= Thomas A. Dyson =

American lawyer and politician

Thomas Alfred Dyson (December 31, 1851 – April 29, 1898) was an American lawyer and politician.

Born in Milwaukee, Wisconsin, Dyson was educated in the Milwaukee public schools. Dyson was a court stenographer. He also was a newspaper reporter for the La Crosse Republican and Leader from 1873 to 1881. Dyson lived in La Crosse, Wisconsin. From 1887 to 1891, Dyson served in the Wisconsin State Senate and was a Republican. From 1887 to 1898, Dyson served as La Crosse County, Wisconsin judge. Dyson died in La Crosse, Wisconsin.
