= John Stoddart (politician) =

American politician

- Born: March 30, 1842; Kirkcaldy, Scotland
- Died: August 5, 1926 (aged 84); Fox Lake, Wisconsin
- Occupation: Wisconsin State Assembly
- Political party: Democratic

John Stoddart (or Stoddard; March 30, 1842 – August 5, 1926) was an American politician. He was a member of the Wisconsin State Assembly.

== Biography ==
Stoddart was born on March 30, 1842, in Kirkcaldy, Scotland. His places of residence included Fond du Lac County, Wisconsin, and Dodge County, Wisconsin. He died at his home in Fox Lake, Wisconsin, on August 5, 1926.

== Career ==
Stoddart was elected to the Assembly in 1888. Other positions he held include Chairman (similar to Mayor) of Fox Lake. He was a Democrat.
