= Edward I. Slupecki =

American politician

Edward I. Slupecki was a Prussian-born American politician. He was a member of the Wisconsin State Assembly.

== Biography ==
Slupecki was born on November 29, 1863, in Poznań, Kingdom of Prussia. Later, he moved to Milwaukee, Wisconsin. He graduated from what is now Marquette University and served in what is now the Wisconsin Army National Guard.

== Assembly career ==
Slupecki was elected to the Assembly in 1888. He was a Democrat.
