= Edgar C. Smith (Wisconsin politician) =

American politician (1852-1913)

E. C. Smith

Member of the Wisconsin State Assembly from the Green Lake district
- In office January 7, 1889 – January 2, 1893
- Preceded by: Charles D. McConnell
- Succeeded by: Orrin W. Bowe

Personal details
- Born: Edgar Clark Smith; December 28, 1852 Green Lake, Wisconsin, U.S.
- Died: April 18, 1913 (aged 60) Markesan, Wisconsin, U.S.
- Resting place: Markesan Memorial Cemetery, Markesan
- Party: Democratic
- Spouse: Marian Wilson (m. 1876–1913)
- Children: Edna Marian Smith; (b. 1878; died 1948)
- Occupation: Farmer, banker, politician

Edgar Clark "Ned" Smith (December 28, 1852 – April 18, 1913) was an American farmer, banker, and Democratic politician from Green Lake County, Wisconsin. He represented Green Lake County for two terms in the Wisconsin State Assembly, from 1889 to 1893. He also served as sheriff of Green Lake County, and was president of the Markesan State Bank in his later years. His name was sometimes abbreviated as E. C. Smith.

== Background ==
Smith was born in the town of Green Lake in Green Lake County, Wisconsin, on December 28, 1852; attended common schools and a business college, and became by occupation a farmer.

== Public office ==
He served as town clerk of the town of Green Lake in 1881–1882 and 1883; and in 1884 served as sheriff of Green Lake County.

Smith was elected to the Assembly in 1888 for a two-year term, receiving 1,602 votes against 1,531 votes for Republican H. B. Lowe and 125 votes for Prohibitionist Ira E. Smith (Republican incumbent Charles D. McConnell was not a candidate). He served on the committees for agriculture, town and county organization, and roads and bridges. McConnell attempted to reclaim his seat in 1890, but Smith prevailed, polling 1867 votes to McConnell's 1139 and Prohibitionist J. E. Smith's 61.

Smith was not a candidate for re-election in 1892, and was succeeded by fellow Democrat Orrin Bow. He died in 1913 and was interred in Markesan.
