= National Register of Historic Places listings in Richland County, Wisconsin =

Location of Richland County in Wisconsin

This is a list of the National Register of Historic Places listings in Richland County, Wisconsin. It is intended to provide a comprehensive listing of entries in the National Register of Historic Places that are located in Richland County, Wisconsin. The locations of National Register properties for which the latitude and longitude coordinates are included below may be seen in a map.

There are 15 properties and districts listed on the National Register in the county.

This National Park Service list is complete through NPS recent listings posted July 24, 2026.

== Current listings ==
	Name on the Register	Image	Date listed	Location	City or town	Description
1	A. D. German Warehouse	A. D. German Warehouse	December 31, 1974 (#74000122)	316 S. Church St. 43°20′00″N 90°23′04″W	Richland Center	Warehouse designed in Mayan Revival style in 1915 by Frank Lloyd Wright, native son of Richland Center. Alfred D. German was a wholesale distributor of cement, coal and grain.
2	Bloyer Mound Group	Bloyer Mound Group	September 18, 2006 (#06000873)	WI 60, 1,500 ft (460 m). SW of Cty Hwy 00; 43°12′07″N 90°24′36″W	Orion	Well-preserved group of mounds built by ancient Native Americans near the Wisconsin River: 3 bird effigies, 2 lizards, 1 bear, eight linear mounds and 1 conical. A.k.a. Twin Lizard Mounds. On state land.
3	Julia B. and Fred P. Bowen House	Julia B. and Fred P. Bowen House	July 5, 1996 (#96000729)	220 E. Union St. 43°20′15″N 90°23′01″W	Richland Center	Julia was the first president of Richland Center's Women's Club starting in 1882, and a pioneer for women's suffrage in Wisconsin. Fred built the house for her in 1869. Today it is a mix of Italianate and Colonial Revival styles.
4	Clipped Wing Eagle Mound	Clipped Wing Eagle Mound	November 15, 2005 (#05001300)	Address Restricted	Eagle	
5	Court Street Commercial Historic District	Court Street Commercial Historic District	November 13, 1989 (#89001955)	Roughly bounded by Mill, Church, Haseltine, and Main Sts. 43°20′09″N 90°23′07″W	Richland Center	The historic district in downtown Richland Center includes 50 commercial buildings in Late Victorian styles constructed from 1870 to 1938.
6	Cunningham Lane Bridge	Cunningham Lane Bridge	July 5, 1996 (#96000731)	Hansberry Lane, near Fancy Cr. 43°23′40″N 90°24′45″W	Rockbridge	Pratt full-slope pony truss bridge across the Pine River, built by the Chicago Bridge & Iron Company in 1895. One of the earliest remaining Pratt truss bridges in the state.
7	Eagle Township Mound Group	Eagle Township Mound Group	November 15, 2005 (#05001301)	Address Restricted	Eagle	
8	Henry Fiedler House	Henry Fiedler House	December 29, 1986 (#86003515)	Putnam and Washington Sts. 43°12′18″N 90°25′32″W	Orion	1860 house built of rough-coursed stone and barn built 1914. A.k.a. Ellen Hale House.
9	Hunting Eagle Mound	Hunting Eagle Mound	November 15, 2005 (#05001299)	Address Restricted	Eagle	
10	Richland Center Archeological District	Richland Center Archeological District	September 30, 1993 (#93001006)	Address Restricted	Richland Center	
11	Richland Center City Auditorium	Richland Center City Auditorium	August 18, 1980 (#80000182)	182 N. Central Ave. 43°20′09″N 90°23′08″W	Richland Center	The local Women's Club promoted a state law to allow municipalities to operate income-generating properties, and this was the first such property, built in 1912. Contains city offices, meeting rooms, and a 900-seat auditorium, which hosted minstrel shows, concerts, motion pictures, and lectures by William Jennings Bryan and William Howard Taft.
12	Shadewald I Mound Group	Shadewald I Mound Group	February 7, 2007 (#07000035)	north of Muscoda along 193	Eagle	Well-preserved sequence of effigy mounds built by ancient Native Americans on a hilltop: possibly including beaver, bird, bison and coyote. A.k.a. Frank's Hill and Elder Group. (The first reference has great aerial photos online.)
13	Shadewald II Mound Group	Shadewald II Mound Group	October 2, 2008 (#08000963)	north of Muscoda along 193	Eagle	Well-preserved line of twelve conical mounds built by ancient Native Americans on a hilltop - possibly with some time-keeping purpose (Summaries of I & II may be flipped in this list.)
14	Syttende Mai Site	Syttende Mai Site	December 30, 1991 (#91001869)	Address Restricted	Richland	
15	Tippesaukee Farm Rural Historic District	Tippesaukee Farm Rural Historic District	January 4, 1996 (#92000827)	Jct. of WI Trunk Hwy. 60 and Co. Trunk Hwy. X, Town of Richwood; 43°12′27″N 90°34′36″W	Port Andrew	John Coumbe, the first settler in the county, built a log cabin here in 1838. He built the timbered barn in 1861 and the current farmhouse in 1863. Previously the site of a Ho-Chunk village named Tippesaukee. This site was NRHP-listed as John Coumbe Farmstead on June 25, 1992, then subsumed by the larger historic district in 1996.

== See also ==
- List of National Historic Landmarks in Wisconsin
- National Register of Historic Places listings in Wisconsin
- Listings in neighboring counties: Crawford, Grant, Iowa, Sauk, Vernon
