= Basswood (disambiguation) =

Basswood (/ˈbæswʊd/) is the common name of several species of the genus Tilia:

- Tilia americana, American basswood
- Tilia caroliniana, Carolina basswood
- Tilia heterophylla, white basswood

Basswood may also refer to:

- Basswood, Michigan, an unincorporated community in the United States
- Basswood, Wisconsin, an unincorporated community in the United States
- Basswood Island, an island in Wisconsin, United States
- Basswood River, a river in the United States and Canada
- USCGC Basswood, a former US Coast Guard cutter
