= Rockbridge =

Rockbridge or Rock Bridge may refer to:

== Geological features and parks ==
- Natural arch, a landform with an opening underneath
- Rock Bridge Memorial State Park, Missouri
- Rockbridge State Nature Preserve, Ohio

== Places ==
United States

- Rockbridge, Georgia
- Rockbridge, Illinois
- Rockbridge, Missouri
- Rockbridge, Ohio
- Rockbridge, Wisconsin
- Rockbridge (community), Wisconsin, an unincorporated community
- Rockbridge County, Virginia

== Other uses ==
- Rock Bridge High School
- Rockbridge Network, American right-wing political advocacy group
- USS Rockbridge (APA-228)
