= Dayton, Wisconsin =

Dayton is the name of some places in the U.S. state of Wisconsin:

- Dayton, Green County, Wisconsin, an unincorporated community
- Dayton, Richland County, Wisconsin, a town
- Dayton, Waupaca County, Wisconsin, a town
