= John H. Babb =

American politician

John Hansel Babb (August 10, 1860 – October 11, 1938) was a farmer, businessman, and politician.

Born in the town of Sylvan, Richland County, Wisconsin, Babb graduated from Boaz High School in Boaz, Wisconsin. He was a farmer and taught in rural schools. In 1894, Babb served as chairman of the Sylvan Town Board and, in 1895, was the Richland County treasurer. In 1901, Babb served in the Wisconsin State Assembly and was a Republican. Babb also was in the banking business in Viola, Wisconsin. Babb died at a hospital in Richland Center, Wisconsin.
