= Sabin, Wisconsin =

Sabin
- Unincorporated community
- Location within the state of Wisconsin
- Coordinates: 43°25′52″N 90°34′8″W
- Country: United States
- State: Wisconsin
- County: Richland
- Time zone: UTC-6 (Central (CST))
  - Summer (DST): UTC-5 (CDT)
- Area code: 608

Sabin is an unincorporated community in the Town of Sylvan, Richland County, Wisconsin, United States. It is located at the intersection of County Highway E and Robbson Drive.

== History ==
Sabin was settled in the 1850s and named for Dr. Eli Sabin, one of the first settlers. Sabin lies near the head waters of Mill Creek, known originally as Eagle Creek or Eagle River. In early days the only access to Sabin was a rough road that followed the creek about 20 miles (30 km) south to its mouth on the Wisconsin River at Orion.

Sabin had two churches. The Disciples or Christian Church of Sabin was organized in 1858 and erected a frame building about 1872. This building was replaced with a new building seating about 400 in 1904. Baptisms were performed in Mill Creek during the summer and in the cheese factory during the winter. The last service in the Christian Church was December 11, 1966, and the building was burned on April 25, 1979. The other church was the Mt. Tabor Methodist Church for which land was deeded in 1868. The local Independent Order of Odd Fellows lodge contributed to the erection of this church and used it for their meetings. This church no longer exists but it was holding services as late as 1900. The Mt. Tabor Methodist Church stood next to the Mt Tabor Cemetery, which received its first burials in the 1860s and remains in use for new burials.

The first school building at Sabin was a log structure erected in 1856. It burned down in 1880 and was replaced the following year by a frame building. This building burned in 1917 and was replaced by another frame structure which burned down in 1929 and was replaced by a brick school house which still stands, although it ceased to be used as a school in 1962. The Sabin Livewires 4-H club has been active in the community since 1946.

There was a cheese factory in Sabin at least as early as 1901, and through a succession of ownership, cheesemakers, and at least three buildings, cheese was made in Sabin until 1960. The second cheese factory, constructed about 1915, was a two-story structure with the factory on the first floor and a large hall and kitchen on the second floor used for community gatherings. Sabin had its own post office from 1886 to 1911. Through several changes of ownership and location, there was a general store in Sabin from before 1896 until 1966. In the 1920s the Jones Lumber Company of Appleton, Wisconsin operated a saw mill at Sabin that produced 1,500,000 board feet (4,000 m^{3}) of lumber in six years.
