= Akan, Wisconsin =

- Town
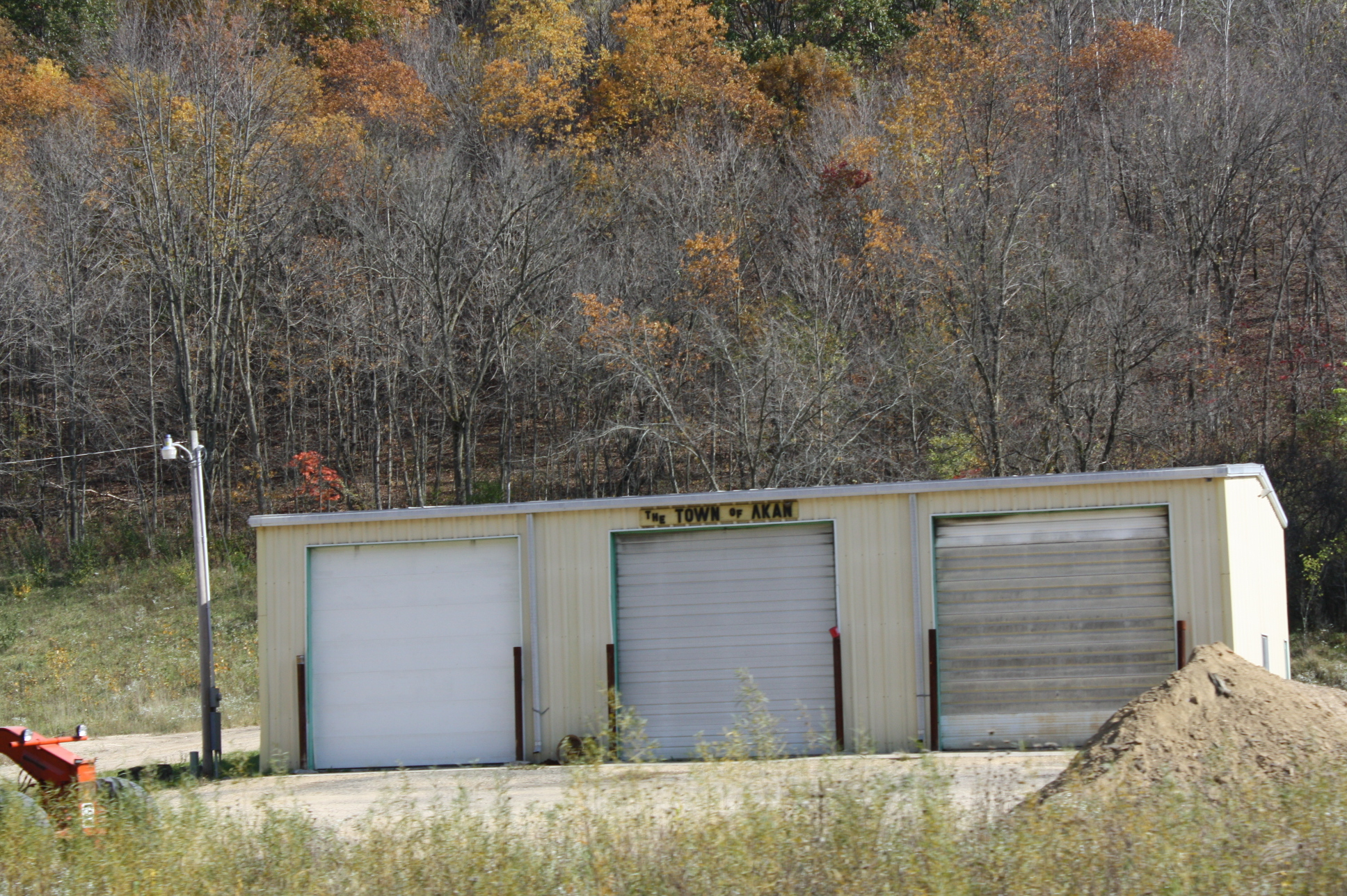
- Town hall

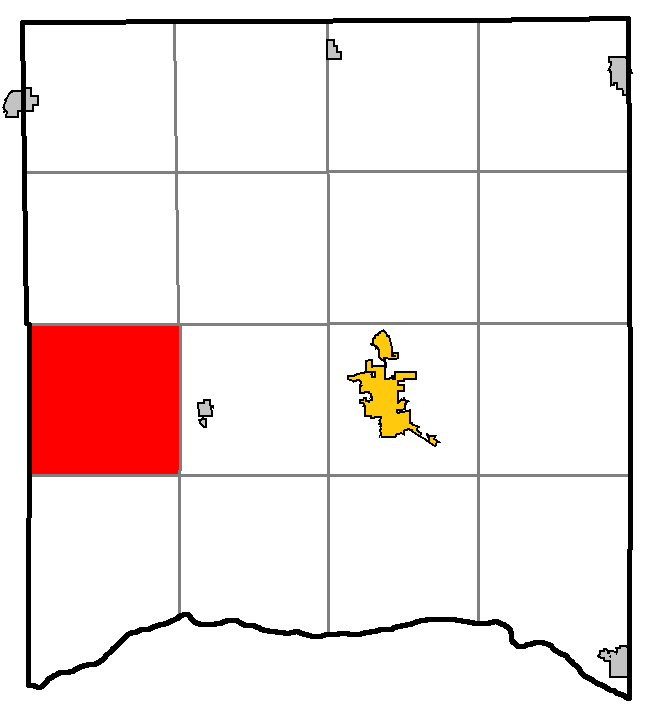
- Location of Akan, Wisconsin

- Location of Richland County, Wisconsin
- Coordinates: 43°19′37″N 90°37′13″W
- Country: United States
- State: Wisconsin
- County: Richland

Area
  - Total: 36.1 sq mi (93.5 km^{2})
  - Land: 36.1 sq mi (93.5 km^{2})
  - Water: 0 sq mi (0.0 km^{2})
- Elevation: 1,007 ft (307 m)

Population (2020)
  - Total: 391
  - Density: 10.8/sq mi (4.18/km^{2})
- Time zone: UTC-6 (Central (CST))
  - Summer (DST): UTC-5 (CDT)
- Area code: 608
- FIPS code: 55-00675
- GNIS feature ID: 1582663
- Website: https://townofakan.gov/

Akan is a town in Richland County, Wisconsin, United States. The population was 391 at the 2020 Census. The unincorporated communities of Five Points and Jimtown are located in the town.

== History ==
Akan was named for road builder Robert Akan, who helped construct a road to Rockbridge.

== Geography ==
According to the United States Census Bureau, the town has a total area of 36.1 square miles (93.6 km^{2}), all land.

== Demographics ==
At the 2000 census, there were 444 people, 158 households, and 125 families residing in the town. The population density was 12.3 per square mile (4.7/km^{2}). There were 211 housing units at an average density of 5.8 per square mile (2.3/km^{2}). The racial makeup of the town was 99.10% White, 0.90% from other races. Hispanic or Latino of any race were 0.90% of the population.

There were 158 households, of which 31.0% had children under the age of 18 living with them, 65.8% were married couples living together, 10.8% had a female householder with no husband present and 20.3% were non-families. 18.4% of all households were made up of individuals, and 7.0% had someone living alone who was 65 years of age or older. The average household size was 2.73 and the average family size was 3.08.

Age distribution was 27.3% under the age of 18, 6.3% from 18 to 24, 24.8% from 25 to 44, 25.9% from 45 to 64, and 15.8% who were 65 years of age or older. The median age was 40 years. For every 100 females, there were 104.6 males. For every 100 females age 18 and over, there were 112.5 males.

The median household income was $39,583, and the median family income was $42,000. Males had a median income of $26,607 versus $20,455 for females. The per capita income for the town was $15,257. About 4.9% of families and 10.8% of the population were below the poverty line, including 7.7% of those under age 18 and 13.5% of those age 65 or over.
