= Tippesaukee Farm Rural Historic District =

Historic district in Wisconsin, United States

- Tippesaukee Farm Rural Historic District (Boundary Increase)
- U.S. National Register of Historic Places
- U.S. Historic district
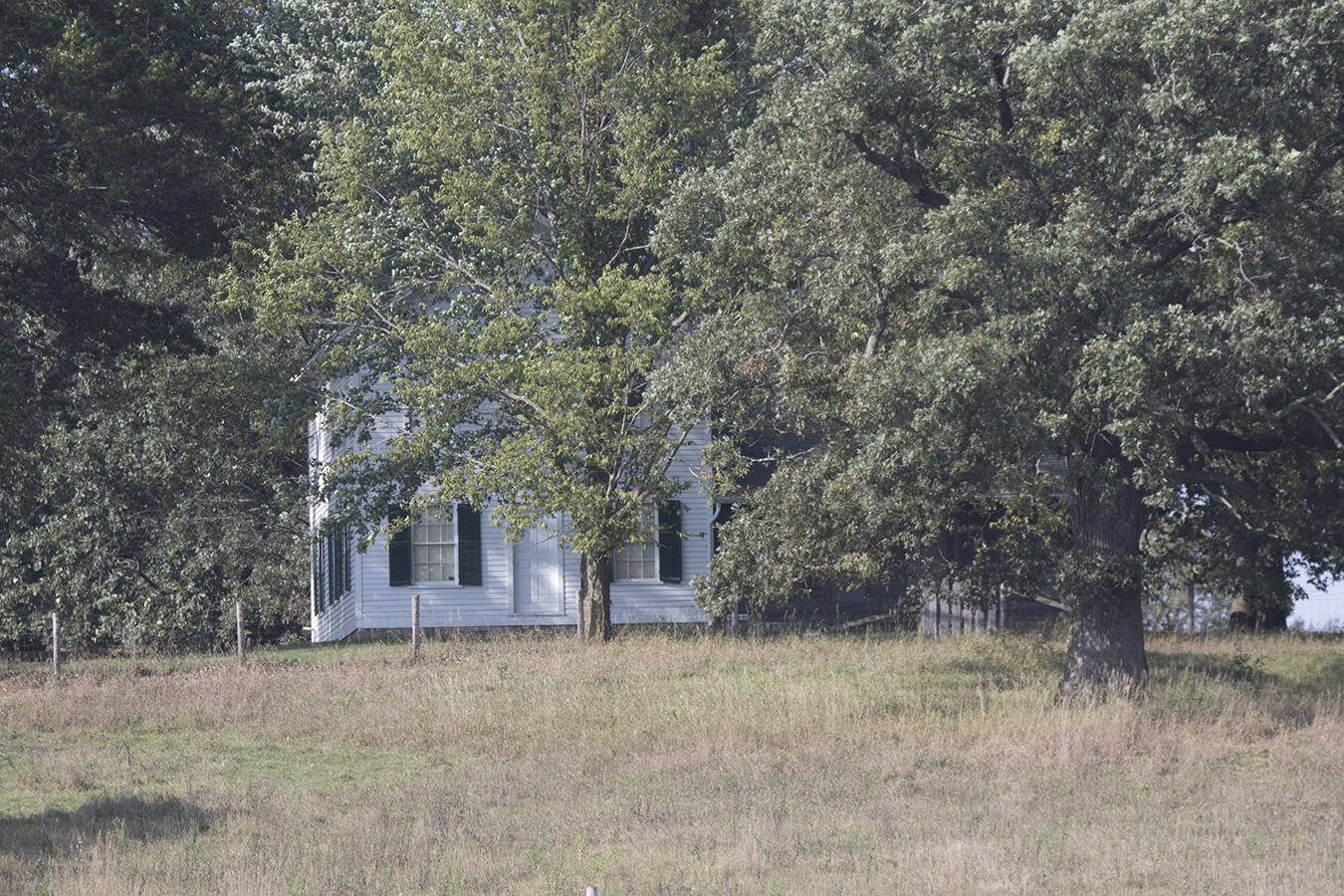

- Location within Wisconsin Location within the United States
- Location: Jct. of WI Trunk Hwy. 60 and Co. Trunk Hwy. X, Town of Richwood, Port Andrew, Wisconsin
- Coordinates: 43°12′27″N 90°34′36″W
- Area: 9.2 acres (3.7 ha) (original); 193.5 acres (78.3 ha) (increase)
- Built: 1838 and 1861
- Architectural style: Greek Revival
- NRHP reference No.: 92000827 and 95001491
- Added to NRHP: June 25, 1992 (original); January 4, 1996 (increase)

The Tippesaukee Farm Rural Historic District is a historic farming area in Richland County, Wisconsin. The John Coumbe Farmstead, also known as Tippesaukee Farm, was listed on the National Register of Historic Places in 1992. Its 9.2-acre (3.7 ha) area included five contributing buildings. The listing area was increased and the listing was renamed Tippesaukee Farm Rural Historic District in 1996. The increase was a 193.5-acre (78.3 ha) area including three contributing sites.

The property has a rock with an embedded historic plaque noting that on this site in 1838 John Coumbe (1808-1882), of Devonshire, became the first white settler in Richland County, Wisconsin.
