= Sylvan, Wisconsin =

- Town
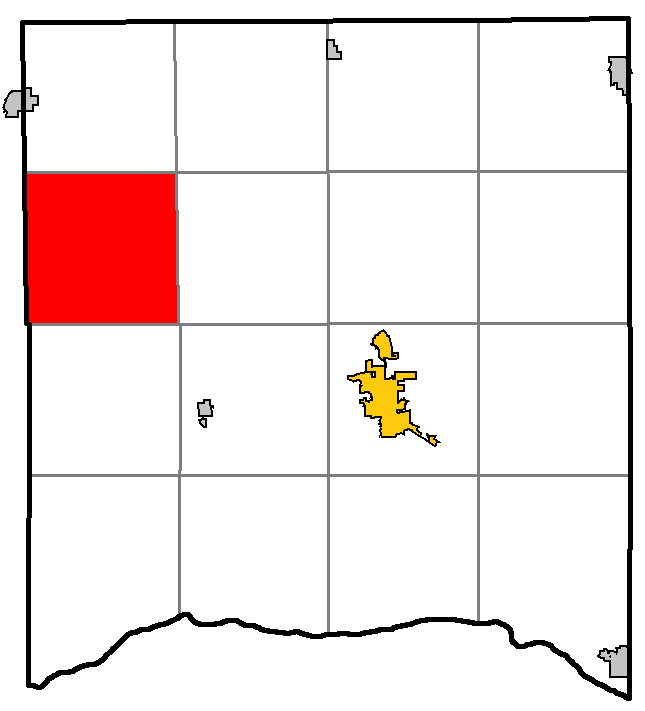
- Location of Sylvan, Wisconsin

- Location of Richland County, Wisconsin
- Coordinates: 43°24′20″N 90°36′11″W
- Country: United States
- State: Wisconsin
- County: Richland

Area
  - Total: 36.1 sq mi (93.5 km^{2})
  - Land: 36.1 sq mi (93.5 km^{2})
  - Water: 0 sq mi (0.0 km^{2})
- Elevation: 1,135 ft (346 m)

Population (2020)
  - Total: 516
  - Density: 14.3/sq mi (5.52/km^{2})
- Time zone: UTC-6 (Central (CST))
  - Summer (DST): UTC-5 (CDT)
- Area code: 608
- FIPS code: 55-78825
- GNIS feature ID: 1584263

Sylvan is a town in Richland County, Wisconsin, United States. The population was 516 at the 2020 census. The unincorporated communities of Bosstown, Sabin, and Sylvan are located within the town. The ghost town of Mill Creek was also located in the town.

== History ==
The first settlement in what became the town of Sylvan took place in 1853. The next year Sylvan was detached from the town of Forest, and in April 1855 the newly organized town held its first election, at which thirty-two votes were cast.

== Geography ==
According to the United States Census Bureau, the town has a total area of 36.1 square miles (93.5 km^{2}), of which 36.1 square miles (93.4 km^{2}) is land and 0.03% is water.

== Demographics ==
As of the census of 2000, there were 547 people, 183 households, and 146 families residing in the town. The population density was 15.2 people per square mile (5.9/km^{2}). There were 222 housing units at an average density of 6.2 per square mile (2.4/km^{2}). The racial makeup of the town was 97.44% White, 1.28% Native American, 0.55% from other races, and 0.73% from two or more races. Hispanic or Latino of any race were 4.57% of the population.

There were 183 households, out of which 37.2% had children under the age of 18 living with them, 73.2% were married couples living together, 5.5% had a female householder with no husband present, and 19.7% were non-families. 16.4% of all households were made up of individuals, and 6.6% had someone living alone who was 65 years of age or older. The average household size was 2.99 and the average family size was 3.41.

In the town, the population was spread out, with 30.3% under the age of 18, 8.0% from 18 to 24, 25.2% from 25 to 44, 22.3% from 45 to 64, and 14.1% who were 65 years of age or older. The median age was 36 years. For every 100 females, there were 106.4 males. For every 100 females age 18 and over, there were 101.6 males.

The median income for a household in the town was $37,917, and the median income for a family was $43,438. Males had a median income of $27,321 versus $20,694 for females. The per capita income for the town was $14,287. About 8.2% of families and 9.1% of the population were below the poverty line, including 10.3% of those under age 18 and 10.0% of those age 65 or over.

== Notable people ==
- John H. Babb, Wisconsin State Representative, farmer, and teacher, was born in the town; Babb served as chairman of the Sylvan Town Board
