= Ash Ridge, Wisconsin =

- Unincorporated community
- Location within Wisconsin Location within the United States
- Coordinates: 43°28′25″N 90°32′59″W
- Country: United States
- State: Wisconsin
- County: Richland
- Elevation: 1,283 ft (391 m)
- Time zone: UTC-6 (Central (CST))
  - Summer (DST): UTC-5 (CDT)
- Area code: 608
- GNIS feature ID: 1560973

Ash Ridge is an unincorporated community located in the towns of Bloom and Forest, Richland County, Wisconsin, United States. Ash Ridge is located on County Highway I, 6.35 miles (10.22 km) east-southeast of Viola.
