= Nevels Corners, Wisconsin =

- Unincorporated community
- Location within Wisconsin Location within the United States
- Coordinates: 43°22′00″N 90°30′19″W
- Country: United States
- State: Wisconsin
- County: Richland
- Elevation: 804 ft (245 m)
- Time zone: UTC-6 (Central (CST))
  - Summer (DST): UTC-5 (CDT)
- Area code: 608
- GNIS feature ID: 1570196

Nevels Corners is an unincorporated community in the town of Dayton, Richland County, Wisconsin, United States. The community was named after George W. Nevel, who had moved from Pennsylvania in the 1850s and established a farm in the area.
