= Byrds Creek, Wisconsin =

- Unincorporated community
- Location within Wisconsin Location within the United States
- Coordinates: 43°13′12″N 90°32′54″W
- Country: United States
- State: Wisconsin
- County: Richland
- Elevation: 682 ft (208 m)
- Time zone: UTC-6 (Central (CST))
  - Summer (DST): UTC-5 (CDT)
- Area code: 608
- GNIS feature ID: 1562494

Byrds Creek is an unincorporated community in the town of Richwood, Richland County, Wisconsin, United States.

== History ==
The community was named for Adam Byrd, who built the first sawmill in the township. The post office was originally established as Bird's Creek in March 1890 and was changed to Byrd's Creek two months later.
