= Forest, Richland County, Wisconsin =

Forest, Wisconsin
- Town
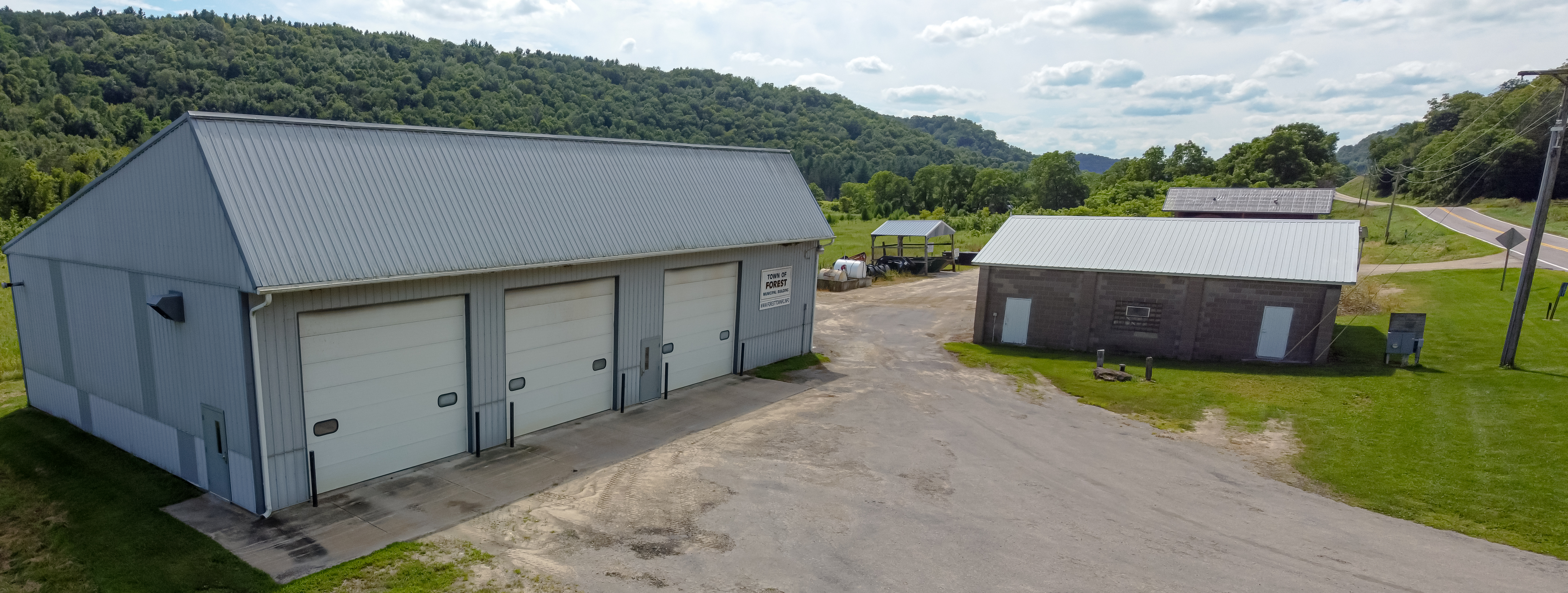
- Town hall

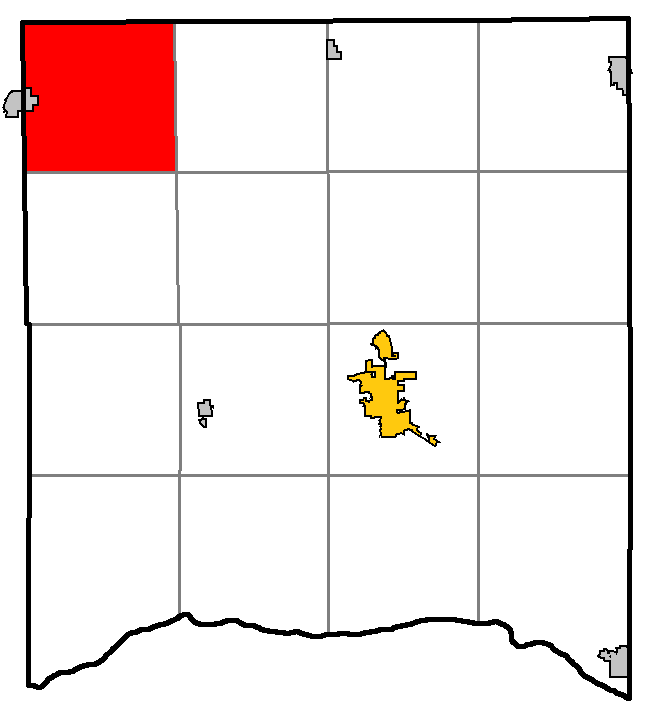
- Location of Forest, Richland County, Wisconsin

- Location of Richland County, Wisconsin
- Coordinates: 43°30′44″N 90°37′34″W
- Country: United States
- State: Wisconsin
- County: Richland

Area
  - Total: 35.5 sq mi (91.9 km^{2})
  - Land: 35.5 sq mi (91.9 km^{2})
  - Water: 0 sq mi (0.0 km^{2})
- Elevation: 846 ft (258 m)

Population (2020)
  - Total: 333
  - Density: 9.38/sq mi (3.62/km^{2})
- Time zone: UTC-6 (Central (CST))
  - Summer (DST): UTC-5 (CDT)
- Area code: 608
- FIPS code: 55-26475
- GNIS feature ID: 1583214
- Website: https://foresttownrcwi.gov/

Forest is a town in Richland County, Wisconsin, United States. The population was 333 at the 2020 census. The unincorporated communities of Ash Ridge and Tunnelville are located partially in the town.

== Geography ==
According to the United States Census Bureau, the town has a total area of 35.5 square miles (91.9 km^{2}), all land.

== Demographics ==
As of the census of 2000, there were 390 people, 139 households, and 111 families residing in the town. The population density was 11.0 people per square mile (4.2/km^{2}). There were 173 housing units at an average density of 4.9 per square mile (1.9/km^{2}). The racial makeup of the town was 97.95% White, 0.51% African American, 0.26% Native American, 0.77% Pacific Islander, and 0.51% from two or more races. Hispanic or Latino of any race were 1.03% of the population.

There were 139 households, out of which 36.0% had children under the age of 18 living with them, 71.9% were married couples living together, 4.3% had a female householder with no husband present, and 20.1% were non-families. 15.8% of all households were made up of individuals, and 6.5% had someone living alone who was 65 years of age or older. The average household size was 2.81 and the average family size was 3.13.

In the town, the population was spread out, with 27.4% under the age of 18, 7.9% from 18 to 24, 24.1% from 25 to 44, 26.4% from 45 to 64, and 14.1% who were 65 years of age or older. The median age was 40 years. For every 100 females, there were 106.3 males. For every 100 females age 18 and over, there were 111.2 males.

The median income for a household in the town was $37,981, and the median income for a family was $39,125. Males had a median income of $29,318 versus $21,042 for females. The per capita income for the town was $16,256. About 12.0% of families and 12.6% of the population were below the poverty line, including 17.6% of those under age 18 and 3.7% of those age 65 or over.

== See also ==
- Forest, Vernon County, Wisconsin
