= Beauford T. Anderson =

US Army officer and Medal of Honor recipient (1922–1996)

Beauford Theodore Anderson
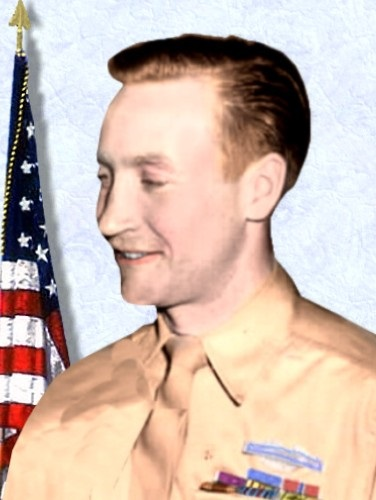
- Born: July 6, 1922; Eagle, Wisconsin, U.S.
- Died: November 7, 1996 (aged 74); Salinas, California, U.S.
- Burial place: Arlington National Cemetery
- Military career
- Allegiance: United States
- Branch: United States Army
- Service years: 1942–1952
- Rank: Second Lieutenant
- Nickname: "Andy"
- Units: 1st Battalion, 381st Infantry Regiment, 96th Infantry Division
- Conflicts: World War II: Philippines campaign (1944–45); Battle of Leyte; Volcano and Ryukyu Islands campaign; Battle of Okinawa (WIA)
- Awards: Medal of Honor; Bronze Star; Purple Heart; World War II Victory Medal

Beauford Theodore "Andy" Anderson (July 6, 1922 – November 7, 1996) was a United States Army soldier who received the Medal of Honor for his actions during World War II.

== Early life ==
Anderson was born on July 6, 1922, in Eagle, Wisconsin, and moved to nearby Soldiers Grove before joining the Army.

== Military service ==
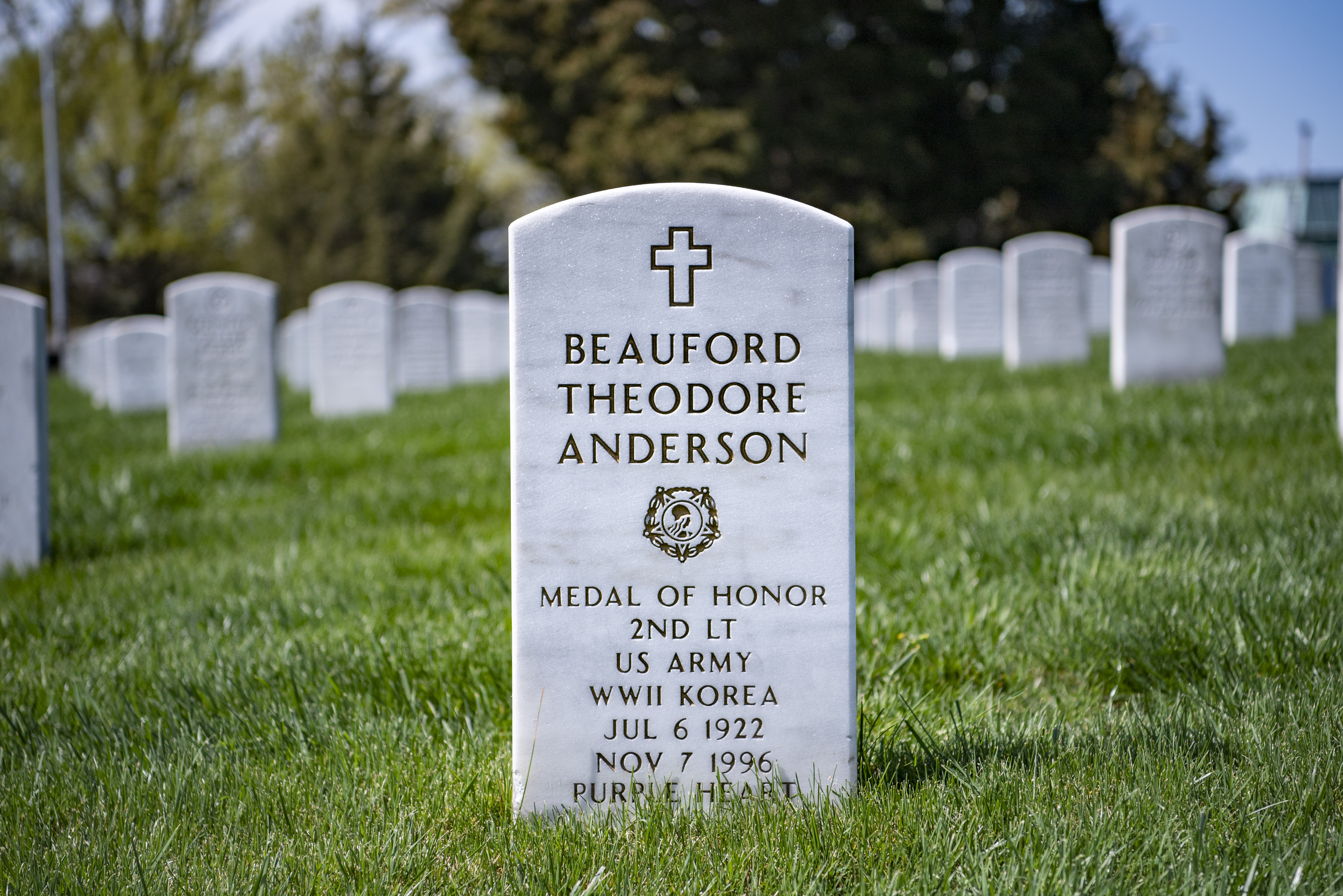
Grave at Arlington National Cemetery

Enlisting in the United States Army in 1942, Anderson was sent to the South West Pacific theater in July 1944. He earned the Bronze Star while serving on the island of Leyte in the Philippines. By April 13, 1945, he was participating in the Battle of Okinawa as a technical sergeant in the 381st Infantry Regiment, 96th Infantry Division. During a Japanese counterattack at Kakazu Ridge on that day, he single-handedly held off a flanking force by alternately firing his carbine and throwing activated mortar shells. Although seriously wounded by shrapnel during the action, he refused medical evacuation until he had reported the situation to his commander. For these actions, Anderson was awarded the Medal of Honor the next year, on June 27, 1946.

Anderson served in the United States Army Reserve after the war, eventually gaining a commission as a second lieutenant. He left the military on September 30, 1952, after ten years of service.

== Medal of Honor citation ==
He displayed conspicuous gallantry and intrepidity above and beyond the call of duty. When a powerfully conducted predawn Japanese counterattack struck his unit's flank, he ordered his men to take cover in an old tomb, and then, armed only with a carbine, faced the onslaught alone. After emptying 1 magazine at pointblank range into the screaming attackers, he seized an enemy mortar dud and threw it back among the charging Japs, killing several as it burst. Securing a box of mortar shells, he extracted the safety pins, banged the bases upon a rock to arm them and proceeded alternately to hurl shells and fire his piece among the fanatical foe, finally forcing them to withdraw. Despite the protests of his comrades, and bleeding profusely from a severe shrapnel wound, he made his way to his company commander to report the action. T/Sgt. Anderson's intrepid conduct in the face of overwhelming odds accounted for 25 enemy killed and several machine guns and knee mortars destroyed, thus single-handedly removing a serious threat to the company's flank.

== Later life ==
After returning from the war, Anderson lived in Beloit, Wisconsin, and later spent time in Mackinac Island, Michigan. Ultimately, he relocated to Monterey County, California, where he served as mayor and city councilman of Seaside and as a Monterey County Supervisor. He lived on a cattle ranch near Hunter Liggett and spent the last years of his life in Salinas.

Anderson died on November 7, 1996. His wife of 50 years, Phyllis, died the next month, on December 23. They are buried together in Arlington National Cemetery.

== See also ==
- List of Medal of Honor recipients for World War II
