= Bloom, Wisconsin =

- Town
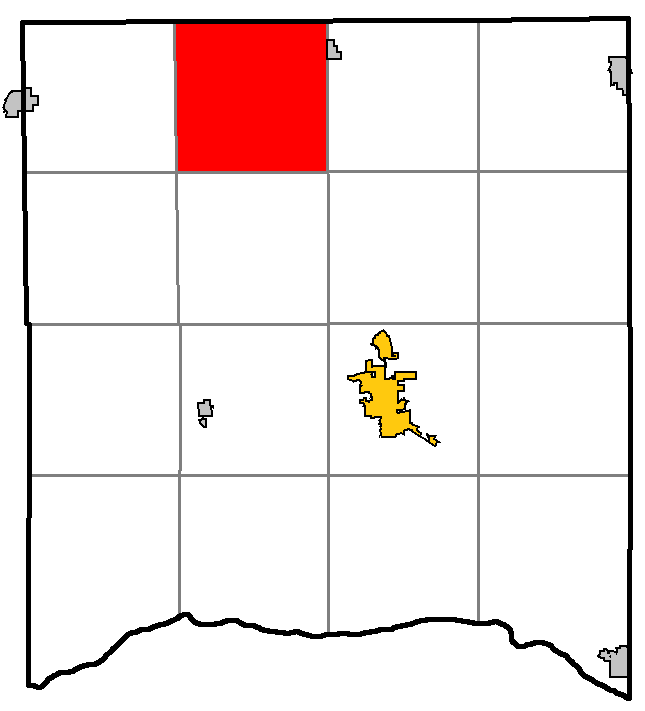
- Location of Bloom, Wisconsin

- Location of Richland County, Wisconsin
- Coordinates: 43°30′46″N 90°28′31″W
- Country: United States
- State: Wisconsin
- County: Richland

Area
  - Total: 36.1 sq mi (93.5 km^{2})
  - Land: 36.1 sq mi (93.5 km^{2})
  - Water: 0 sq mi (0.0 km^{2})
- Elevation: 1,188 ft (362 m)

Population (2020)
  - Total: 538
  - Density: 14.9/sq mi (5.75/km^{2})
- Time zone: UTC-6 (Central (CST))
  - Summer (DST): UTC-5 (CDT)
- Area code: 608
- FIPS code: 55-08175
- GNIS feature ID: 1582829
- Website: https://townofbloomwi.gov/

Bloom is a town in Richland County, Wisconsin, United States. The population was 538 at the 2020 census. The unincorporated communities of Bloom City and West Lima are located within the Town of Bloom. The unincorporated community of Ash Ridge is also located partially in the town.

== Geography ==
According to the United States Census Bureau, the town has a total area of 36.1 square miles (93.5 km^{2}), all land.

== Demographics ==
As of the census of 2000, there were 487 people, 190 households, and 130 families residing in the town. The population density was 13.5 people per square mile (5.2/km^{2}). There were 241 housing units at an average density of 6.7 per square mile (2.6/km^{2}). The racial makeup of the town was 97.95% White, 1.23% Native American, 0.21% from other races, and 0.62% from two or more races. Hispanic or Latino of any race were 0.82% of the population.

There were 190 households, out of which 26.8% had children under the age of 18 living with them, 60.0% were married couples living together, 4.7% had a female householder with no husband present, and 31.1% were non-families. 24.2% of all households were made up of individuals, and 10.0% had someone living alone who was 65 years of age or older. The average household size was 2.56 and the average family size was 3.07.

In the town, the population was spread out, with 22.6% under the age of 18, 10.3% from 18 to 24, 26.1% from 25 to 44, 24.2% from 45 to 64, and 16.8% who were 65 years of age or older. The median age was 40 years. For every 100 females, there were 107.2 males. For every 100 females age 18 and over, there were 106.0 males.

The median income for a household in the town was $33,281, and the median income for a family was $33,646. Males had a median income of $26,250 versus $19,583 for females. The per capita income for the town was $18,017. About 5.7% of families and 8.4% of the population were below the poverty line, including 10.0% of those under age 18 and 8.6% of those age 65 or over.
