= Westford, Richland County, Wisconsin =

Westford, Wisconsin
- Town
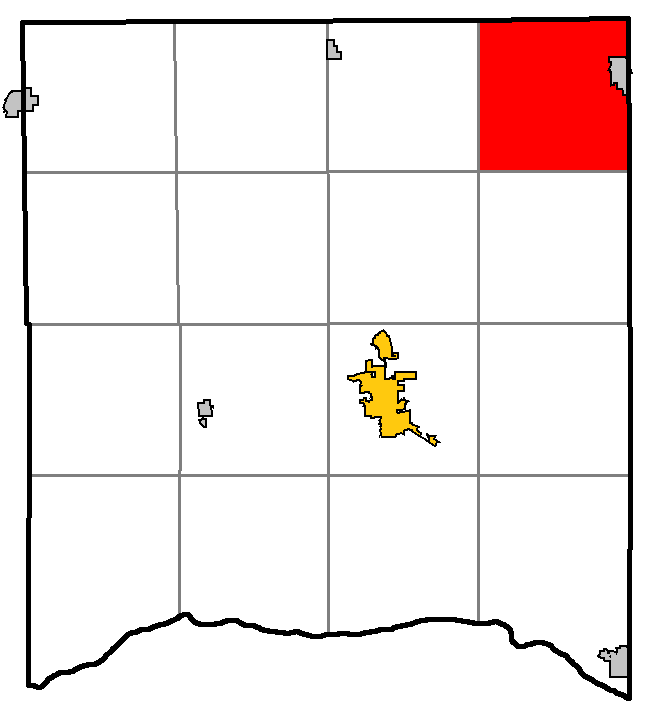
- Location of Westford, Richland County, Wisconsin

- Location of Richland County, Wisconsin
- Coordinates: 43°30′46″N 90°14′22″W
- Country: United States
- State: Wisconsin
- County: Richland

Area
  - Total: 34.9 sq mi (90.5 km^{2})
  - Land: 34.9 sq mi (90.4 km^{2})
  - Water: 0 sq mi (0.0 km^{2})
- Elevation: 1,171 ft (357 m)

Population (2020)
  - Total: 516
  - Density: 14.8/sq mi (5.71/km^{2})
- Time zone: UTC-6 (Central (CST))
  - Summer (DST): UTC-5 (CDT)
- Area code: 608
- FIPS code: 55-85675
- GNIS feature ID: 1584407
- Website: https://westfordwi.gov/

Westford is a town in Richland County, Wisconsin, United States. The population was 516 at the 2020 census. The unincorporated communities of Bunker Hill and Germantown are located in the town. The unincorporated community of Corwin was also located in the town.

Westford was named after Westford, New York, which was the home town of Ada and Levi Lincoln, early storekeepers.

== Geography ==
According to the United States Census Bureau, the town has a total area of 34.9 square miles (90.5 km^{2}), of which 34.9 square miles (90.4 km^{2}) is land and 0.04 square mile (0.1 km^{2}) (0.06%) is water.

== Demographics ==
As of the census of 2000, there were 594 people, 191 households, and 152 families residing in the town. The population density was 17.0 people per square mile (6.6/km^{2}). There were 239 housing units at an average density of 6.8 per square mile (2.6/km^{2}). The racial makeup of the town was 98.32% White, 0.17% African American, 0.51% Native American, and 1.01% from two or more races. Hispanic or Latino of any race were 0.51% of the population.

There were 191 households, out of which 37.7% had children under the age of 18 living with them, 74.3% were married couples living together, 1.6% had a female householder with no husband present, and 19.9% were non-families. 15.7% of all households were made up of individuals, and 6.3% had someone living alone who was 65 years of age or older. The average household size was 3.11 and the average family size was 3.54.

In the town, the population was spread out, with 32.2% under the age of 18, 8.9% from 18 to 24, 25.9% from 25 to 44, 23.1% from 45 to 64, and 9.9% who were 65 years of age or older. The median age was 36 years. For every 100 females, there were 109.2 males. For every 100 females age 18 and over, there were 117.8 males.

The median income for a household in the town was $39,375, and the median income for a family was $45,179. Males had a median income of $30,750 versus $19,659 for females. The per capita income for the town was $13,519. About 11.2% of families and 23.6% of the population were below the poverty line, including 38.7% of those under age 18 and 17.4% of those age 65 or over.
