= Bosstown, Wisconsin =

- Unincorporated community
- Location within Wisconsin Location within the United States
- Coordinates: 43°23′25″N 90°36′36″W
- Country: United States
- State: Wisconsin
- County: Richland
- Elevation: 935 ft (285 m)
- Time zone: UTC-6 (Central (CST))
  - Summer (DST): UTC-5 (CDT)
- Area code: 608
- GNIS feature ID: 1577522

Bosstown is an unincorporated community located on U.S. Route 14 in the south-central part of the town of Sylvan in Richland County, Wisconsin, United States. The community was apparently named for shopkeeper and livestock dealer William H. Dosch, who was popularly known as "Boss" Dosch.
