= Jimtown, Wisconsin =

- Unincorporated community
- Location within Wisconsin Location within the United States
- Coordinates: 43°21′12″N 90°38′18″W
- Country: United States
- State: Wisconsin
- County: Richland
- Elevation: 823 ft (251 m)
- Time zone: UTC-6 (Central (CST))
  - Summer (DST): UTC-5 (CDT)
- Area code: 608
- GNIS feature ID: 1577664

Jimtown is an unincorporated community located in the town of Akan, Richland County, Wisconsin, United States. The community was named for two local land owners: Jim Burns and Jim Bachtenkircher.
