= Stark, Wisconsin =

- Town
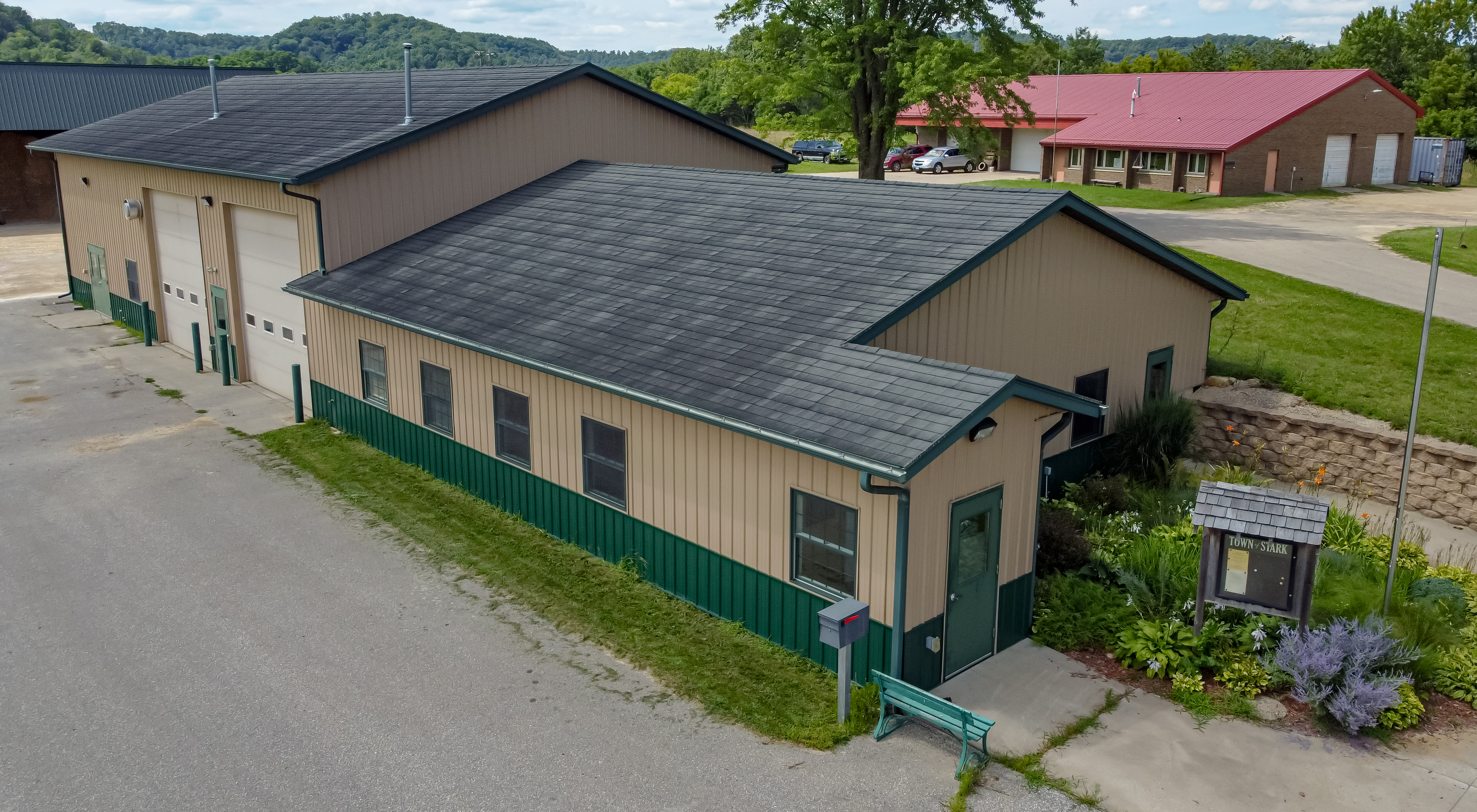
- Town hall

- Location in Vernon County and the state of Wisconsin.
- Coordinates: 43°35′44″N 90°36′35″W
- Country: United States
- State: Wisconsin
- County: Vernon

Area
  - Total: 34.4 sq mi (89.2 km^{2})
  - Land: 34.4 sq mi (89.1 km^{2})
  - Water: 0 sq mi (0.0 km^{2})
- Elevation: 1,243 ft (379 m)

Population (2020)
  - Total: 351
  - Density: 10.2/sq mi (3.94/km^{2})
- Time zone: UTC-6 (Central (CST))
  - Summer (DST): UTC-5 (CDT)
- Area code: 608
- FIPS code: 55-76725
- GNIS feature ID: 1584213

Stark is a town in Vernon County, Wisconsin, United States. The population was 351 at the 2020 census. The unincorporated community of Tunnelville is located partially in the town.

== Geography ==
According to the United States Census Bureau, the town has a total area of 34.4 square miles (89.2 km^{2}), of which 34.4 square miles (89.1 km^{2}) is land and 0.03% is water.

== Demographics ==
As of the census of 2000, there were 349 people, 138 households, and 100 families residing in the town. The population density was 10.1 people per square mile (3.9/km^{2}). There were 198 housing units at an average density of 5.8 per square mile (2.2/km^{2}). The racial makeup of the town was 99.14% White, 0.86% from other races. Hispanic or Latino of any race were 0.57% of the population.

There were 138 households, out of which 26.1% had children under the age of 18 living with them, 67.4% were married couples living together, 3.6% had a female householder with no husband present, and 27.5% were non-families. 22.5% of all households were made up of individuals, and 9.4% had someone living alone who was 65 years of age or older. The average household size was 2.53 and the average family size was 2.96.

In the town, the population was spread out, with 24.1% under the age of 18, 6.3% from 18 to 24, 19.5% from 25 to 44, 36.7% from 45 to 64, and 13.5% who were 65 years of age or older. The median age was 45 years. For every 100 females, there were 105.3 males. For every 100 females age 18 and over, there were 115.4 males.

The median income for a household in the town was $44,167, and the median income for a family was $48,393. Males had a median income of $27,250 versus $23,750 for females. The per capita income for the town was $17,966. About 18.7% of families and 20.1% of the population were below the poverty line, including 40.0% of those under age 18 and 23.8% of those age 65 or over.
