= Richwood, Wisconsin =

- Town
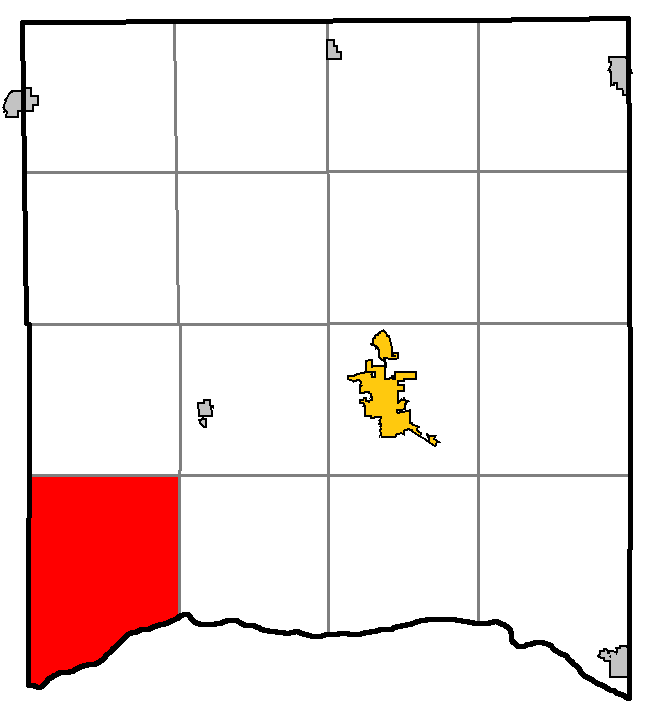
- Location of Richwood, Wisconsin

- Location of Richland County, Wisconsin
- Coordinates: 43°14′51″N 90°36′44″W
- Country: United States
- State: Wisconsin
- County: Richland

Area
  - Total: 42.4 sq mi (109.9 km^{2})
  - Land: 41.7 sq mi (108.0 km^{2})
  - Water: 0.73 sq mi (1.9 km^{2})
- Elevation: 715 ft (218 m)

Population (2020)
  - Total: 527
  - Density: 12.6/sq mi (4.88/km^{2})
- Time zone: UTC-6 (Central (CST))
  - Summer (DST): UTC-5 (CDT)
- Area code: 608
- FIPS code: 55-67775
- GNIS feature ID: 1584031

Richwood is a town in Richland County, Wisconsin, United States. The population was 527 at the 2020 census. The unincorporated communities of Byrds Creek, Excelsior, Port Andrew, Sand Prairie, Tavera, Westport, and Wild Rose are located in the town.

== Geography ==
According to the United States Census Bureau, the town has a total area of 42.5 square miles (109.9 km^{2}), of which 41.7 square miles (108.0 km^{2}) is land and 0.7 square mile (1.9 km^{2}) (1.74%) is water.

== Demographics ==
As of the census of 2000, there were 618 people, 238 households, and 178 families residing in the town. The population density was 14.8 people per square mile (5.7/km^{2}). There were 299 housing units at an average density of 7.2 per square mile (2.8/km^{2}). The racial makeup of the town was 98.54% White, 0.32% African American, 0.16% Native American, 0.65% from other races, and 0.32% from two or more races. Hispanic or Latino of any race were 0.97% of the population.

There were 238 households, out of which 34.0% had children under the age of 18 living with them, 60.9% were married couples living together, 8.4% had a female householder with no husband present, and 24.8% were non-families. 21.4% of all households were made up of individuals, and 9.2% had someone living alone who was 65 years of age or older. The average household size was 2.60 and the average family size was 3.02.

In the town, the population was spread out, with 26.4% under the age of 18, 6.1% from 18 to 24, 26.7% from 25 to 44, 26.1% from 45 to 64, and 14.7% who were 65 years of age or older. The median age was 40 years. For every 100 females, there were 113.8 males. For every 100 females age 18 and over, there were 109.7 males.

The median income for a household in the town was $35,156, and the median income for a family was $38,750. Males had a median income of $28,583 versus $22,125 for females. The per capita income for the town was $17,304. About 6.4% of families and 8.2% of the population were below the poverty line, including 10.6% of those under age 18 and 11.5% of those age 65 or over.
