= Bloom City, Wisconsin =

- Unincorporated community
- Location within Wisconsin Location within the United States
- Coordinates: 43°29′40″N 90°27′53″W
- Country: United States
- State: Wisconsin
- County: Richland
- Elevation: 856 ft (261 m)
- Time zone: UTC-6 (Central (CST))
  - Summer (DST): UTC-5 (CDT)
- Area code: 608
- GNIS feature ID: 1561927

Bloom City is an unincorporated community located, in the town of Bloom, in Richland County, Wisconsin, United States. Bloom City is 10 miles (16 km) east of Viola.
