= Corwin, Wisconsin =

- Ghost town
- Location within Wisconsin
- Coordinates: 43°30′12″N 90°16′53″W
- Country: United States
- State: Wisconsin
- County: Richland
- Elevation: 1,263 ft (385 m)
- GNIS feature ID: 1957774

Corwin is a ghost town in the town of Westford, Richland County, Wisconsin, United States.
