= Tunnelville, Wisconsin =

- Unincorporated community
- Location within Wisconsin Location within the United States
- Coordinates: 43°33′11″N 90°39′30″W
- Country: United States
- State: Wisconsin
- Counties: Richland and Vernon
- Elevation: 801 ft (244 m)
- Time zone: UTC-6 (Central (CST))
  - Summer (DST): UTC-5 (CDT)
- Area code: 608
- GNIS feature ID: 1577860

Tunnelville is an unincorporated community in the counties of Richland and Vernon in the U.S. state of Wisconsin. The portion in Richland County is located in the town of Forest, and the portion in Vernon County is located in the town of Stark.
