= Julia B. and Fred P. Bowen House =

Historic house in Wisconsin, United States

- U.S. National Register of Historic Places
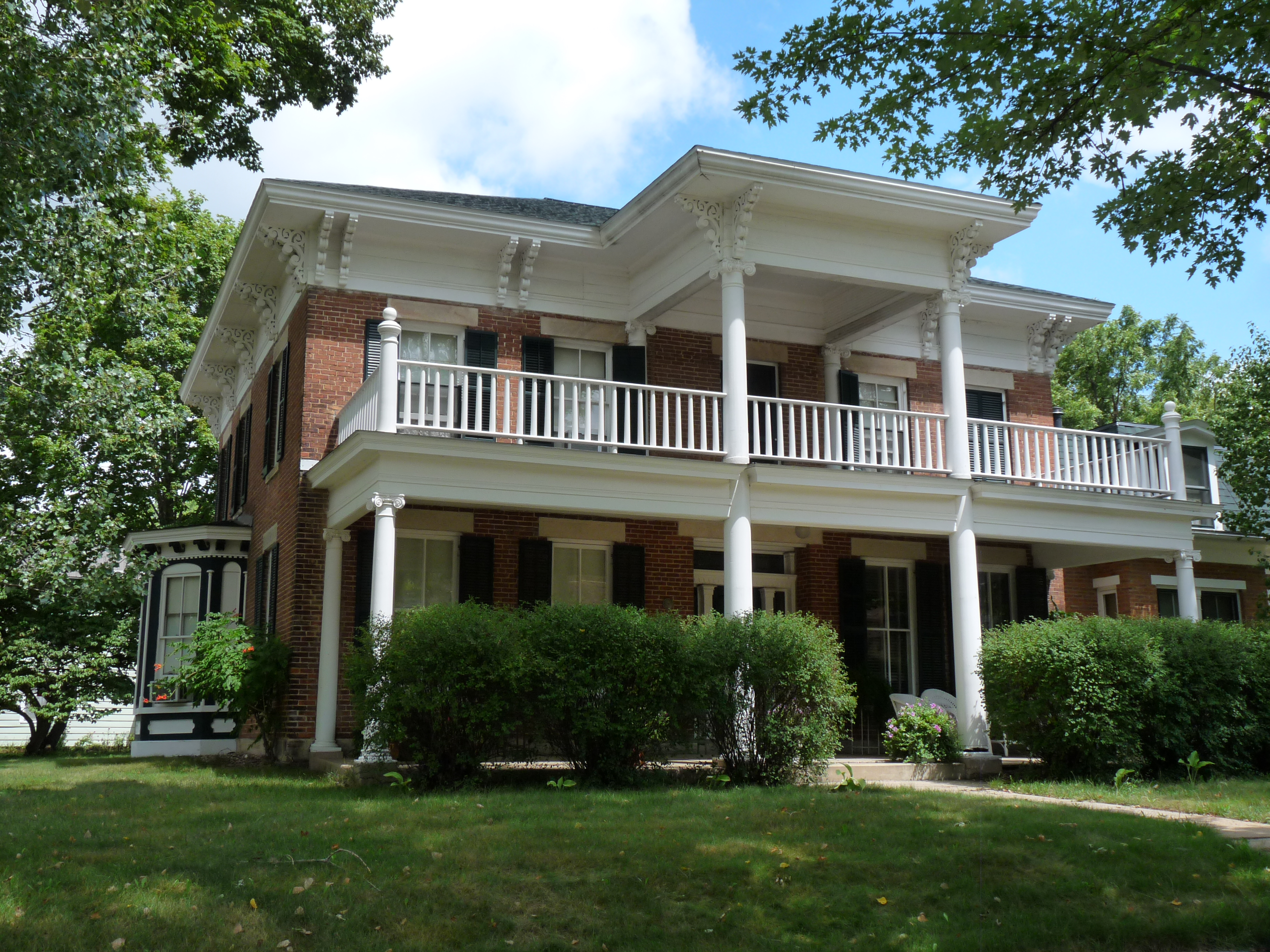

- Location within Wisconsin Location within the United States
- Location: 220 E. Union St. Richland Center, Wisconsin
- Coordinates: 43°20′15″N 90°23′1″W
- Area: less than one acre
- Built: 1882
- Architectural style: Italianate/Second Empire/Classical Revival
- NRHP reference No.: 96000729
- Added to NRHP: July 5, 1996

The Julia B. and Fred P. Bowen House is a historic house built in 1869 in Richland Center, Wisconsin. In 1996 the house was added to the National Register of Historic Places, locally significant as an example of Italianate architecture, and for its association with Julia Busby Bowen, who worked for women's suffrage.

Julia Busby was born in 1840 in New York. She studied at Alfred University, where she was impressed by a painting teacher, Abigail Ann Allen, who spoke up for women's rights. In 1860 Julia married S.N. Waite and they moved to the South, where they were imprisoned by the Confederacy during the Civil War. Julia's husband escaped and later died in battle. Julia was released, and the young widow eventually came to teach in Richland Center where her brother was sheriff.

Frederick Phelps Bowen was born in 1835 and came to Richland Center in 1854, where he and his brother started Bowen's Mill. He also ran a drugstore, a tannery and a livestock dealership. Fred and the new teacher married, and in 1869 Frederick built Julia a house that was stylish and modern for the time.

The 1869 main block is two-story, rectangular, with walls of red brick, and a low-pitched hip roof. Double brackets support the eaves, clearly Italianate in style. The windows are flanked by shutters and a polygonal bay window protrudes from the west wall. The roof was originally covered with cedar shingles. The house originally had a one-story entry porch, and a one-story wooden cookhouse attached to the east side. Inside the front door is an entrance hall, with a staircase with a carved wood rail leading upstairs. The first story contains formal rooms: parlor, library, second parlor, and dining room. Upstairs are four bedrooms. Julia wanted a "modern house," with wood-burning stoves in each room and no fireplaces.

In the 1880s the cookhouse was replaced with a 2-story kitchen wing, with a Second Empire-styled mansard roof. The wing also contained a laundry room, a bath, and a pantry with a built-in icebox.

As mentioned above, Julia was a leader in the early women's suffrage movement. In 1876 she and Mrs. D.E. Pease were the first women to serve on the Richland Center school board. In 1882 she was involved in starting a Richland Center Woman's Club whose written aim was to "aid social, intellectual, and philanthropic interests," but whose true aim was women's suffrage. They met at the home of Laura Briggs James and elected Julia their first president. She told them "we must be as wise as serpents and as harmless as doves if we are to make converts to our course." Two months later, Julia and a delegation from Richland Center attended a convention in Madison to form the Wisconsin State Suffrage Association; 11 of the 34 delegates came from Richland Center, giving an idea of the importance of Julia's group at the state level. In 1884 the state-level association held its first annual convention in Richland Center.

In 1883 Julia and the Woman's Club played a role in getting a new schoolhouse built in Richland Center. She was also involved in the temperance movement. The Richland Center Woman's Club also cared for the poor, looked out for imprisoned women, arranged funerals for the needy, established a farmer's market, and helped establish a library.

In 1908 Julia and Fred's son-in-law Grant Ross replaced the original porch with the grander portico over the front door and the porch and balcony that run across the front. The columns are slender, with Ionic capitals, and the style of the porch is Classical Revival.

Still, the Bowen home is probably the best remaining symbol of the women's suffrage pioneers in Richland Center. Laura James and her husband had a fine house, and her daughter Ada was prominent in the second generation of suffragettes in Wisconsin, but Ada later remodeled their house, while the Bowen house is largely intact.
