= Rockbridge (community), Wisconsin =

Rockbridge, Wisconsin
- Unincorporated community
- Location within Wisconsin Location within the United States
- Coordinates: 43°26′54″N 90°21′50″W
- Country: United States
- State: Wisconsin
- County: Richland
- Elevation: 761 ft (232 m)
- Time zone: UTC-6 (Central (CST))
  - Summer (DST): UTC-5 (CDT)
- Area code: 608
- GNIS feature ID: 1578617

Rockbridge is an unincorporated community located in the town of Rockbridge, Richland County, Wisconsin, United States.

Rockbridge sits is south-central Wisconsin. It has a population of 734. The median income is $65,996, slightly higher than the average of $64,168.
