= Basswood, Michigan =

- Unincorporated community
- Location within the state of Michigan Basswood (the United States)
- Coordinates: 46°11′19″N 88°50′42″W
- Country: United States
- State: Michigan
- County: Iron
- Township: Mastodon Township
- Elevation: 1,591 ft (485 m)
- Time zone: UTC-6 (Central (CST))
  - Summer (DST): UTC-5 (CDT)
- ZIP code: 49935
- Area code: 906
- GNIS feature ID: 1619105

Basswood is an unincorporated community in Iron County, in the U.S. state of Michigan.

The community was named from a grove of basswood trees near the town site.
