= Eagle, Richland County, Wisconsin =

Eagle, Wisconsin
- Town
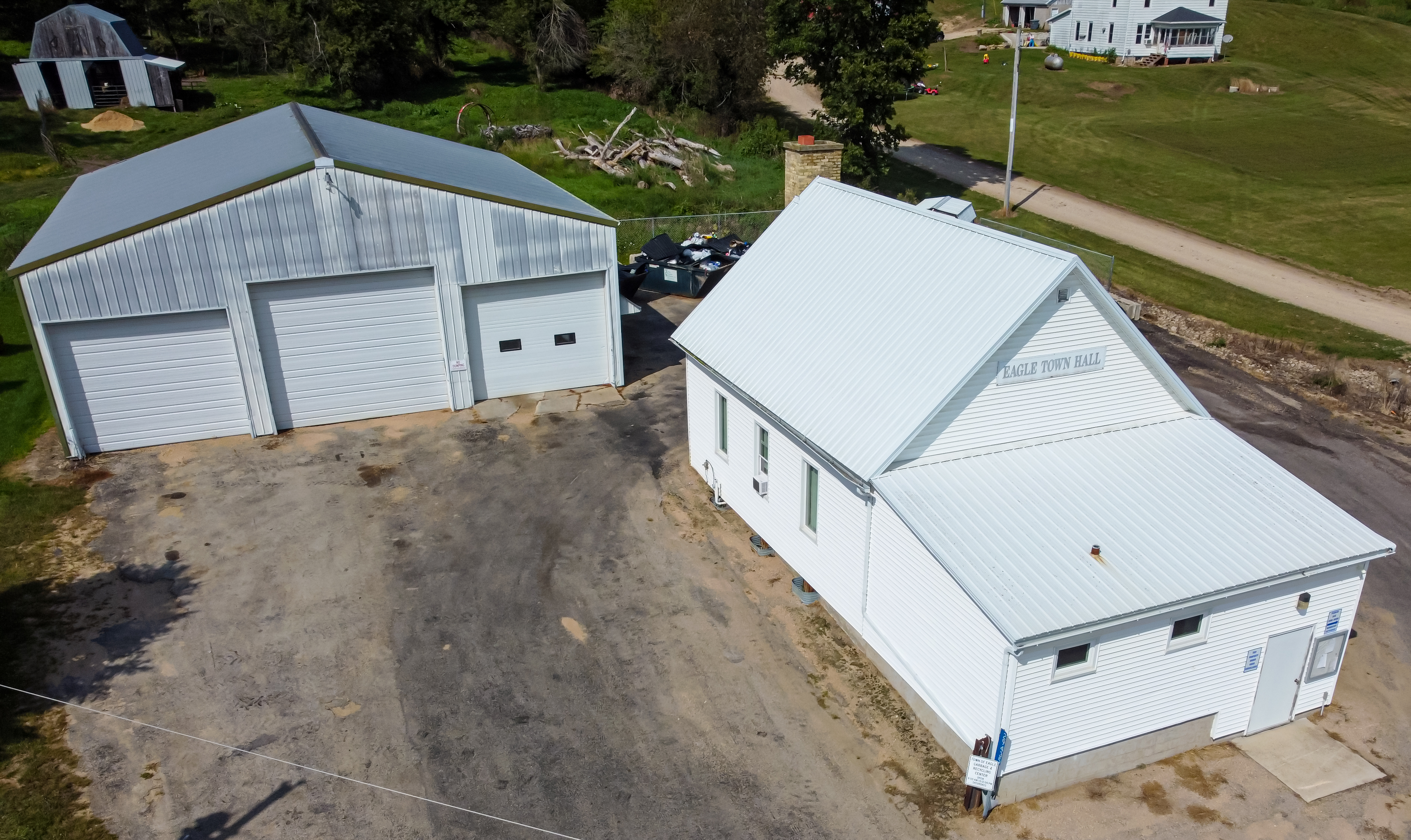
- Town hall

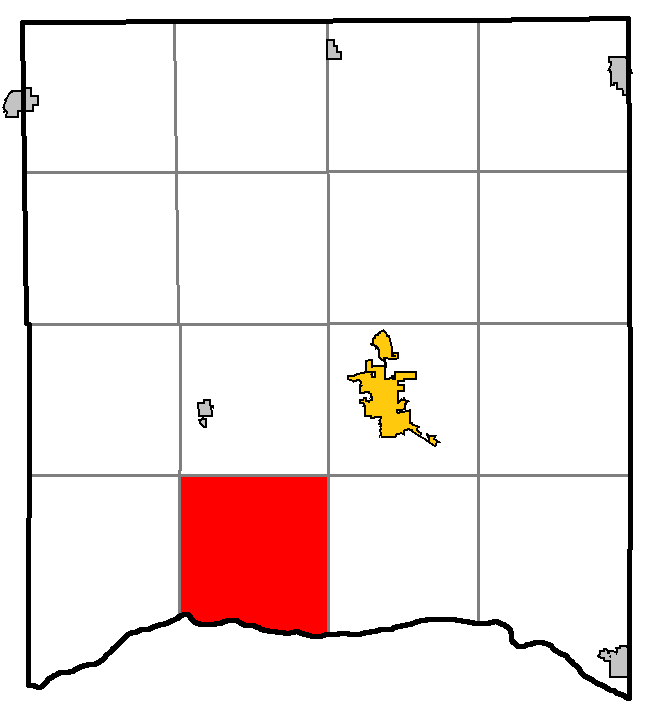
- Location of Eagle, Richland County, Wisconsin

- Location of Richland County, Wisconsin
- Coordinates: 43°15′0″N 90°29′6″W
- Country: United States
- State: Wisconsin
- County: Richland

Area
  - Total: 35.6 sq mi (92.2 km^{2})
  - Land: 34.7 sq mi (90.0 km^{2})
  - Water: 0.85 sq mi (2.2 km^{2})
- Elevation: 686 ft (209 m)

Population (2020)
  - Total: 492
  - Density: 14.2/sq mi (5.47/km^{2})
- Time zone: UTC-6 (Central (CST))
  - Summer (DST): UTC-5 (CDT)
- Area code: 608
- FIPS code: 55-21400
- GNIS feature ID: 1583110

Eagle is a town in Richland County, Wisconsin, United States. The population was 492 at the 2020 census. The unincorporated communities of Balmoral, Basswood, and Eagle Corners are located in the town.

== Geography ==
According to the United States Census Bureau, the town has a total area of 35.6 square miles (92.2 km^{2}), of which 34.8 square miles (90.0 km^{2}) is land and 0.9 square mile (2.2 km^{2}) (2.42%) is water.

== Demographics ==
As of the census of 2000, there were 593 people, 223 households, and 165 families residing in the town. The population density was 17.1 people per square mile (6.6/km^{2}). There were 267 housing units at an average density of 7.7 per square mile (3.0/km^{2}). The racial makeup of the town was 99.33% White, 0.34% Asian, and 0.34% from two or more races. Hispanic or Latino of any race were 0.67% of the population.

There were 223 households, out of which 32.3% had children under the age of 18 living with them, 65.0% were married couples living together, 5.8% had a female householder with no husband present, and 25.6% were non-families. 19.3% of all households were made up of individuals, and 7.2% had someone living alone who was 65 years of age or older. The average household size was 2.66 and the average family size was 3.07.

In the town, the population was spread out, with 26.6% under the age of 18, 6.2% from 18 to 24, 26.1% from 25 to 44, 27.7% from 45 to 64, and 13.3% who were 65 years of age or older. The median age was 40 years. For every 100 females, there were 103.8 males. For every 100 females age 18 and over, there were 102.3 males.

The median income for a household in the town was $36,944, and the median income for a family was $38,750. Males had a median income of $28,750 versus $17,500 for females. The per capita income for the town was $16,026. About 11.5% of families and 13.4% of the population were below the poverty line, including 22.4% of those under age 18 and 12.5% of those age 65 or over.

== Notable people ==
- Beauford T. Anderson, Medal of Honor, World War II
- Joshua L. Johns, Wisconsin politician
- Jess Miller, Wisconsin politician
