= Dayton, Richland County, Wisconsin =

Dayton, Wisconsin
- Town
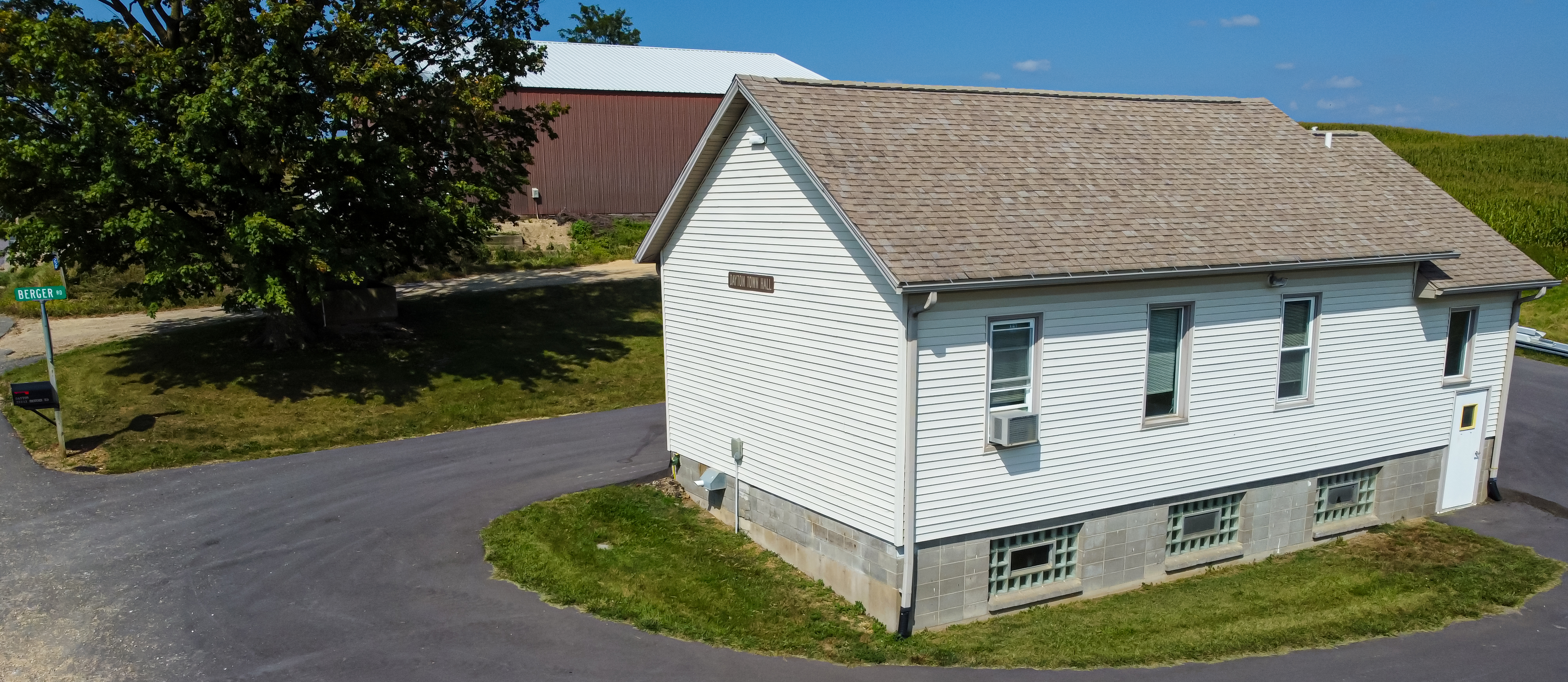
- Town hall

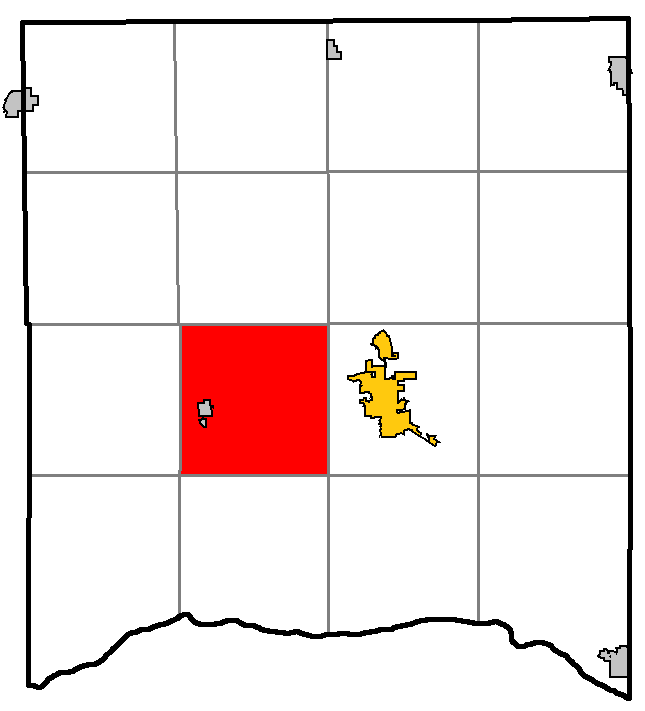
- Location of Dayton, Richland County, Wisconsin

- Location of Richland County, Wisconsin
- Coordinates: 43°20′19″N 90°29′46″W
- Country: United States
- State: Wisconsin
- County: Richland

Area
  - Total: 35.1 sq mi (90.9 km^{2})
  - Land: 35.1 sq mi (90.9 km^{2})
  - Water: 0 sq mi (0.0 km^{2})
- Elevation: 1,001 ft (305 m)

Population (2020)
  - Total: 763
  - Density: 21.7/sq mi (8.39/km^{2})
- Time zone: UTC-6 (Central (CST))
  - Summer (DST): UTC-5 (CDT)
- Area code: 608
- FIPS code: 55-19000
- GNIS feature ID: 1583055
- Website: https://daytonrcwi.gov/

Dayton is a town in Richland County, Wisconsin, United States. The population was 763 at the 2020 census. The unincorporated community of Nevels Corners is located in the town. The ghost town of Ashford was also located in the town.

== Geography ==
According to the United States Census Bureau, the town has a total area of 35.1 square miles (90.9 km^{2}), all land.

== Demographics ==
As of the census of 2000, there were 723 people, 269 households, and 197 families residing in the town. The population density was 20.6 people per square mile (8.0/km^{2}). There were 307 housing units at an average density of 8.7 per square mile (3.4/km^{2}). The racial makeup of the town was 98.62% White, 0.14% African American, 0.55% Native American, 0.28% Asian, and 0.41% from two or more races. Hispanic or Latino of any race were 0.41% of the population.

There were 269 households, out of which 32.3% had children under the age of 18 living with them, 66.5% were married couples living together, 3.7% had a female householder with no husband present, and 26.4% were non-families. 23.8% of all households were made up of individuals, and 12.6% had someone living alone who was 65 years of age or older. The average household size was 2.66 and the average family size was 3.13.

In the town, the population was spread out, with 26.4% under the age of 18, 6.8% from 18 to 24, 24.3% from 25 to 44, 28.5% from 45 to 64, and 14.0% who were 65 years of age or older. The median age was 40 years. For every 100 females, there were 106.6 males. For every 100 females age 18 and over, there were 112.0 males.

The median income for a household in the town was $35,938, and the median income for a family was $43,646. Males had a median income of $30,000 versus $23,000 for females. The per capita income for the town was $17,382. About 2.4% of families and 8.3% of the population were below the poverty line, including 7.4% of those under age 18 and 3.7% of those age 65 or over.

== See also ==
- List of towns in Wisconsin
