= Basswood, Wisconsin =

- Unincorporated community
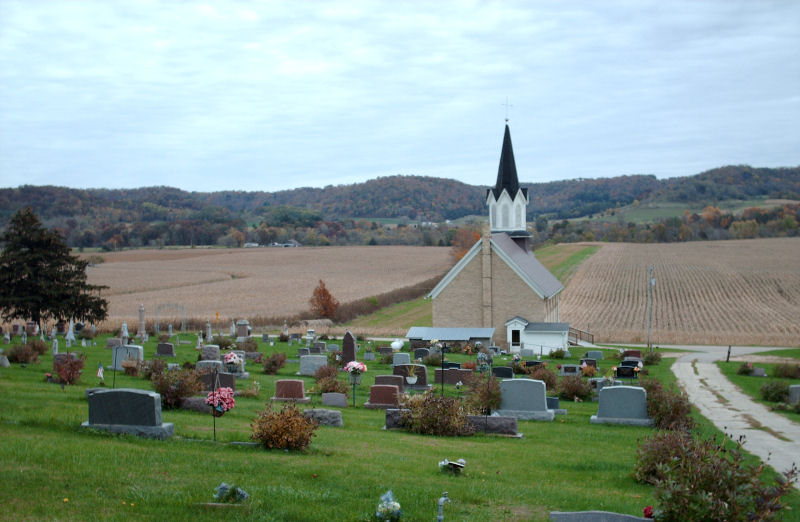
- Basswood Cemetery

- Location within Wisconsin Location within the United States
- Coordinates: 43°15′45″N 90°29′57″W
- Country: United States
- State: Wisconsin
- County: Richland
- Elevation: 732 ft (223 m)
- Time zone: UTC-6 (Central (CST))
  - Summer (DST): UTC-5 (CDT)
- Area code: 608
- GNIS feature ID: 1577506

Basswood is an unincorporated community located in the town of Eagle, Richland County, Wisconsin, United States. Basswood is located on County Highway E, 7.5 miles (12.1 km) southwest of Richland Center. The area's original post office, which opened in August 1869, was named Lucas in honor of farmer James Lucas. Later that year, the name was changed to Bass Wood and was changed again to Basswood in 1892.
