= Orion, Wisconsin =

- Town
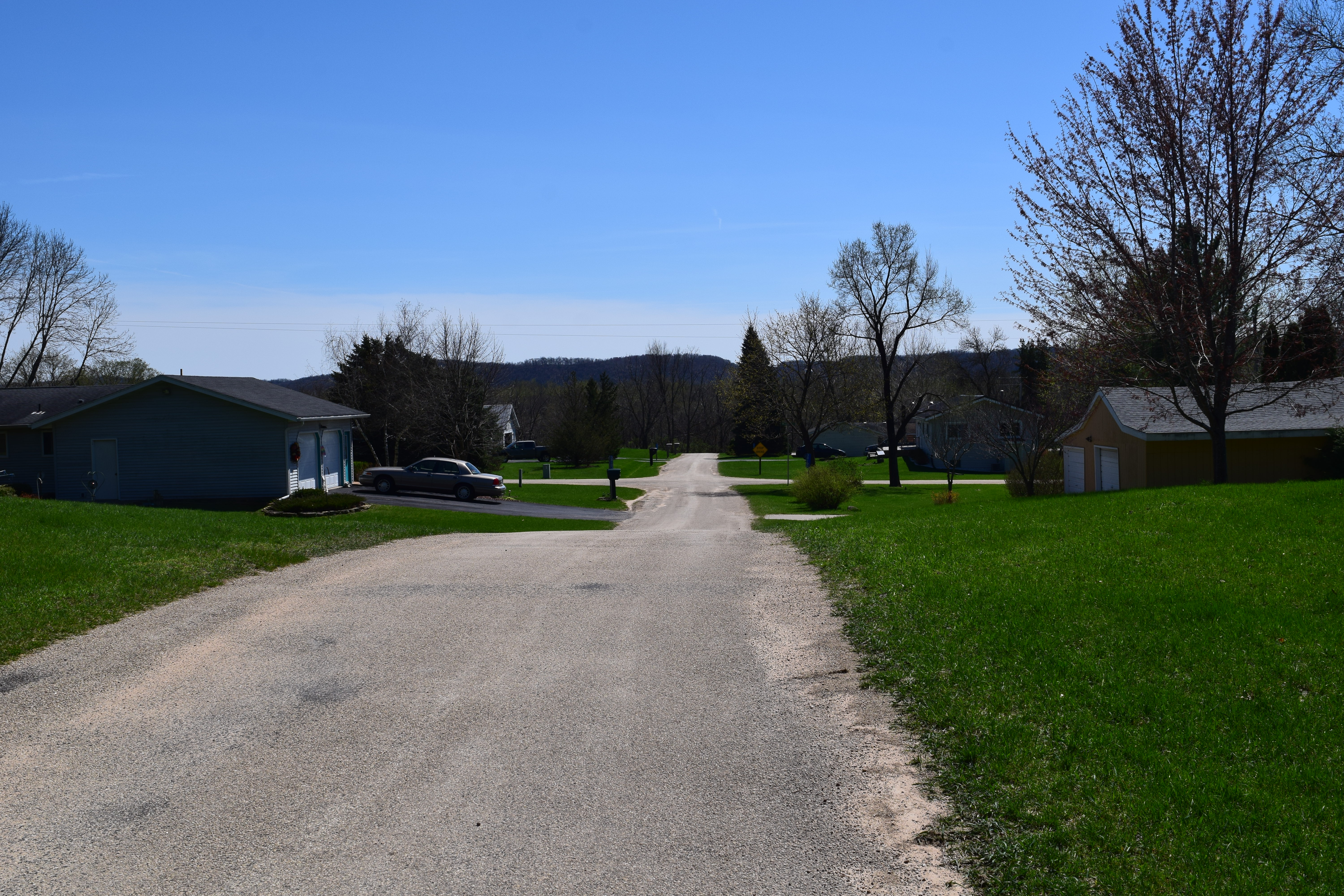
- The community of Orion

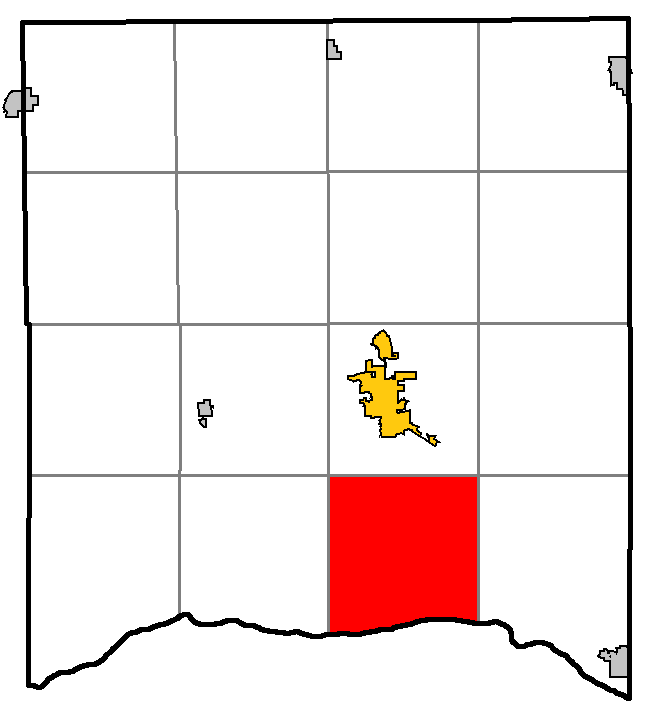
- Location of Orion, Wisconsin

- Location of Richland County, Wisconsin
- Coordinates: 43°15′28″N 90°22′15″W
- Country: United States
- State: Wisconsin
- County: Richland

Area
  - Total: 36.2 sq mi (93.8 km^{2})
  - Land: 35.8 sq mi (92.7 km^{2})
  - Water: 0.42 sq mi (1.1 km^{2})
- Elevation: 912 ft (278 m)

Population (2020)
  - Total: 541
  - Density: 15.1/sq mi (5.84/km^{2})
- Time zone: UTC-6 (Central (CST))
  - Summer (DST): UTC-5 (CDT)
- Area code: 608
- FIPS code: 55-60350
- GNIS feature ID: 1583871
- Website: https://orionwi.gov/

Orion is a town in Richland County, Wisconsin, United States. The population was 541 at the 2020 census. The unincorporated communities of Orion and Twin Bluffs are located in the town.

== Geography ==
According to the United States Census Bureau, the town has a total area of 36.2 square miles (93.8 km^{2}), of which 35.8 square miles (92.7 km^{2}) is land and 0.4 square mile (1.1 km^{2}) (1.19%) is water.

== Demographics ==
As of the census of 2000, there were 628 people, 233 households, and 185 families residing in the town. The population density was 17.5 people per square mile (6.8/km^{2}). There were 309 housing units at an average density of 8.6 per square mile (3.3/km^{2}). The racial makeup of the town was 99.52% White, 0.16% Native American, 0.16% from other races, and 0.16% from two or more races. Hispanic or Latino of any race were 0.16% of the population.

There were 233 households, out of which 35.2% had children under the age of 18 living with them, 65.2% were married couples living together, 5.2% had a female householder with no husband present, and 20.6% were non-families. 18.5% of all households were made up of individuals, and 7.7% had someone living alone who was 65 years of age or older. The average household size was 2.70 and the average family size was 3.02.

In the town, the population was spread out, with 26.8% under the age of 18, 6.2% from 18 to 24, 27.1% from 25 to 44, 25.3% from 45 to 64, and 14.6% who were 65 years of age or older. The median age was 38 years. For every 100 females, there were 108.6 males. For every 100 females age 18 and over, there were 105.4 males.

The median income for a household in the town was $44,643, and the median income for a family was $49,167. Males had a median income of $28,929 versus $22,857 for females. The per capita income for the town was $20,823. About 3.3% of families and 7.3% of the population were below the poverty line, including 7.4% of those under age 18 and 2.1% of those age 65 or over.

== Notable people ==
- Daniel Downs, Wisconsin State Senator was born in Orion
- George H. Hodges, 19th governor of the state of Kansas was born in Orion
