= Richland County, Wisconsin =

County in Wisconsin, United States

- County
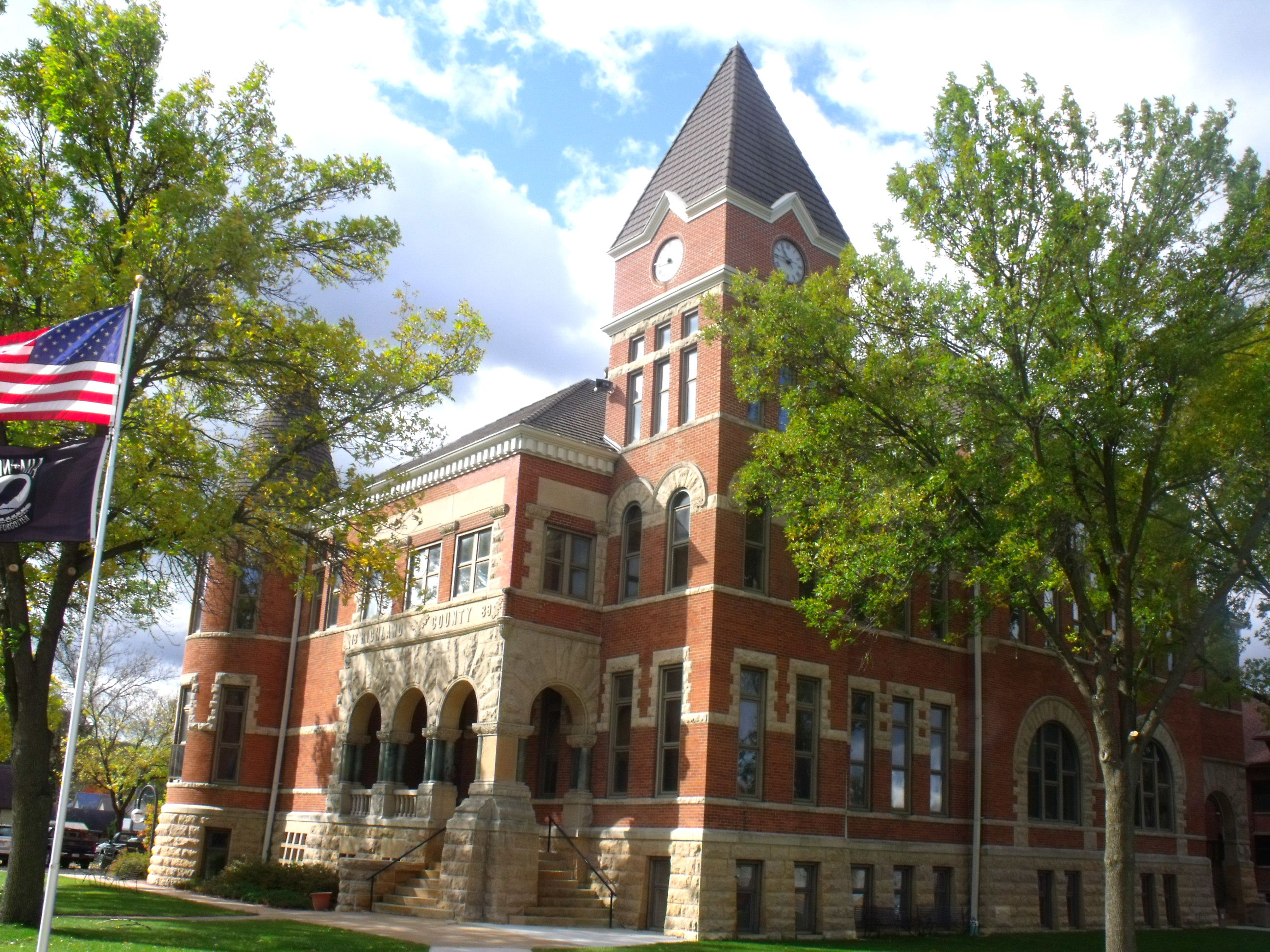
- Richland County Courthouse

- Location within the U.S. state of Wisconsin
- Coordinates: 43°23′N 90°26′W
- Country: United States
- State: Wisconsin
- Founded: 1850
- Seat: Richland Center
- Largest city: Richland Center

Area
  - Total: 589 sq mi (1,530 km^{2})
  - Land: 586 sq mi (1,520 km^{2})
  - Water: 3.1 sq mi (8.0 km^{2}) 0.5%

Population (2020)
  - Total: 17,304
  - Estimate (2025): 17,036 ▼
  - Density: 29.2/sq mi (11.3/km^{2})
- Time zone: UTC−6 (Central)
  - Summer (DST): UTC−5 (CDT)
- Congressional districts: 2nd, 3rd
- Website: richlandcountywi.gov

Richland County is a county in the U.S. state of Wisconsin. As of the 2020 census, the population was 17,304. Its county seat is Richland Center. The county was created from the Wisconsin Territory in 1842 and organized in 1850. It is named for the high quality of its soil.

== Geography ==
According to the U.S. Census Bureau, the county has a total area of 589 square miles (1,530 km^{2}), of which 586 square miles (1,520 km^{2}) is land and 3.1 square miles (8.0 km^{2}) (0.5%) is water.

=== Major highways ===
- U.S. Highway 14
- Highway 56 (Wisconsin)
- Highway 58 (Wisconsin)
- Highway 60 (Wisconsin)
- Highway 80 (Wisconsin)
- Highway 130 (Wisconsin)
- Highway 131 (Wisconsin)
- Highway 133 (Wisconsin)
- Highway 154 (Wisconsin)
- Highway 171 (Wisconsin)
- Highway 193 (Wisconsin)

=== Airport ===
Richland Airport (93C) serves the county and surrounding communities.

=== Adjacent counties ===
- Vernon County – north
- Sauk County – east
- Iowa County – southeast
- Grant County – southwest
- Crawford County – west

== Demographics ==
Historical population
Census	Pop.	Note	%±
1850	903		—
1860	9,732		977.7%
1870	15,731		61.6%
1880	18,174		15.5%
1890	19,121		5.2%
1900	19,483		1.9%
1910	18,809		−3.5%
1920	19,823		5.4%
1930	19,525		−1.5%
1940	20,381		4.4%
1950	19,245		−5.6%
1960	17,684		−8.1%
1970	17,079		−3.4%
1980	17,476		2.3%
1990	17,521		0.3%
2000	17,924		2.3%
2010	18,021		0.5%
2020	17,304		−4.0%
2025 (est.)	17,036	▼	−1.5%
U.S. Decennial Census; 1790–1960 1900–1990; 1990–2000 2010 2020

=== Racial and ethnic composition ===
Richland County, Wisconsin – Racial and ethnic composition Note: the US Census treats Hispanic/Latino as an ethnic category. This table excludes Latinos from the racial categories and assigns them to a separate category. Hispanics/Latinos may be of any race.
Race / Ethnicity (NH = Non-Hispanic)	Pop 1980	Pop 1990	Pop 2000	Pop 2010	Pop 2020	% 1980	% 1990	% 2000	% 2010	% 2020
White alone (NH)	17,334	17,375	17,546	17,315	16,014	99.19%	99.17%	97.89%	96.08%	92.55%
Black or African American alone (NH)	23	12	26	79	92	0.13%	0.07%	0.15%	0.44%	0.53%
Native American or Alaska Native alone (NH)	18	33	37	44	42	0.10%	0.19%	0.21%	0.24%	0.24%
Asian alone (NH)	27	38	38	88	95	0.15%	0.22%	0.21%	0.49%	0.55%
Native Hawaiian or Pacific Islander alone (NH)	x	x	5	4	0	x	x	0.03%	0.02%	0.00%
Other race alone (NH)	13	4	6	10	24	0.07%	0.02%	0.03%	0.06%	0.14%
Mixed race or Multiracial (NH)	x	x	99	121	511	x	x	0.55%	0.67%	2.95%
Hispanic or Latino (any race)	61	59	167	360	526	0.35%	0.34%	0.93%	2.00%	3.04%
Total	17,476	17,521	17,924	18,021	17,304	100.00%	100.00%	100.00%	100.00%	100.00%

=== 2020 census ===
As of the 2020 census, the county had a population of 17,304, the median age was 45.4 years, 22.7% of residents were under the age of 18, 23.4% were 65 years of age or older, and there were 104.5 males for every 100 females (102.4 per 100 females age 18 and over).

The population density was 29.5 people per square mile (11.4 people/km^{2}) with 8,475 housing units at an average density of 14.5 units per square mile (5.6 units/km^{2}).

The racial makeup of the county was 93.4% White, 0.6% Black or African American, 0.3% American Indian and Alaska Native, 0.6% Asian, <0.1% Native Hawaiian and Pacific Islander, 1.2% from some other race, and 4.0% from two or more races. Hispanic or Latino residents of any race comprised 3.0% of the population.

28.5% of residents lived in urban areas, while 71.5% lived in rural areas.

There were 7,141 households in the county, of which 25.9% had children under the age of 18 living in them. Of all households, 49.1% were married-couple households, 21.2% were households with a male householder and no spouse or partner present, and 22.2% were households with a female householder and no spouse or partner present. About 30.7% of all households were made up of individuals and 14.8% had someone living alone who was 65 years of age or older.

Of those housing units, 15.7% were vacant. Among occupied housing units, 74.4% were owner-occupied and 25.6% were renter-occupied. The homeowner vacancy rate was 1.3% and the rental vacancy rate was 7.1%.

=== 2000 census ===
2000 Census Age Pyramid for Richland County

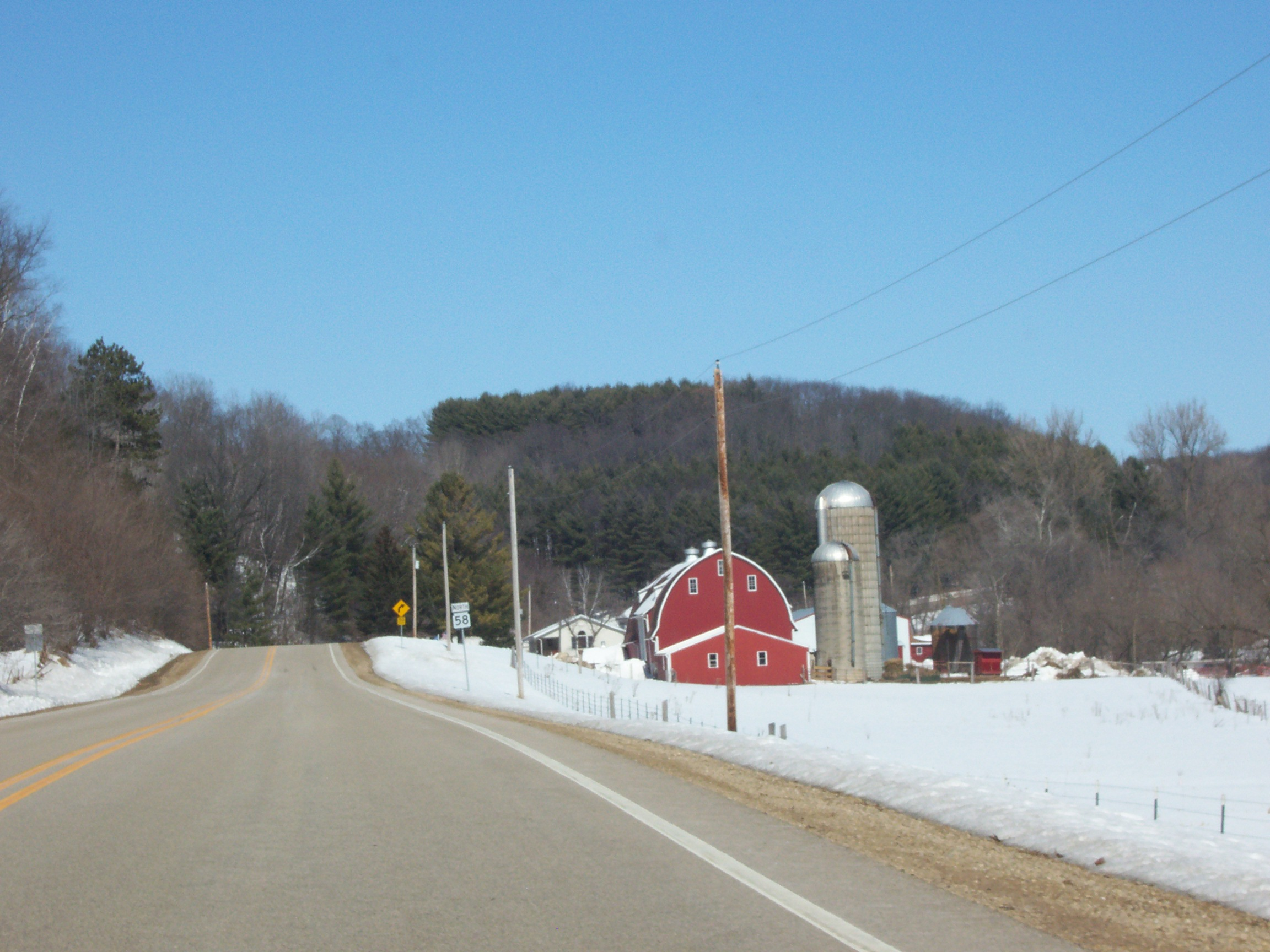
Farm along Highway 58 in rural Richland County near Cazenovia

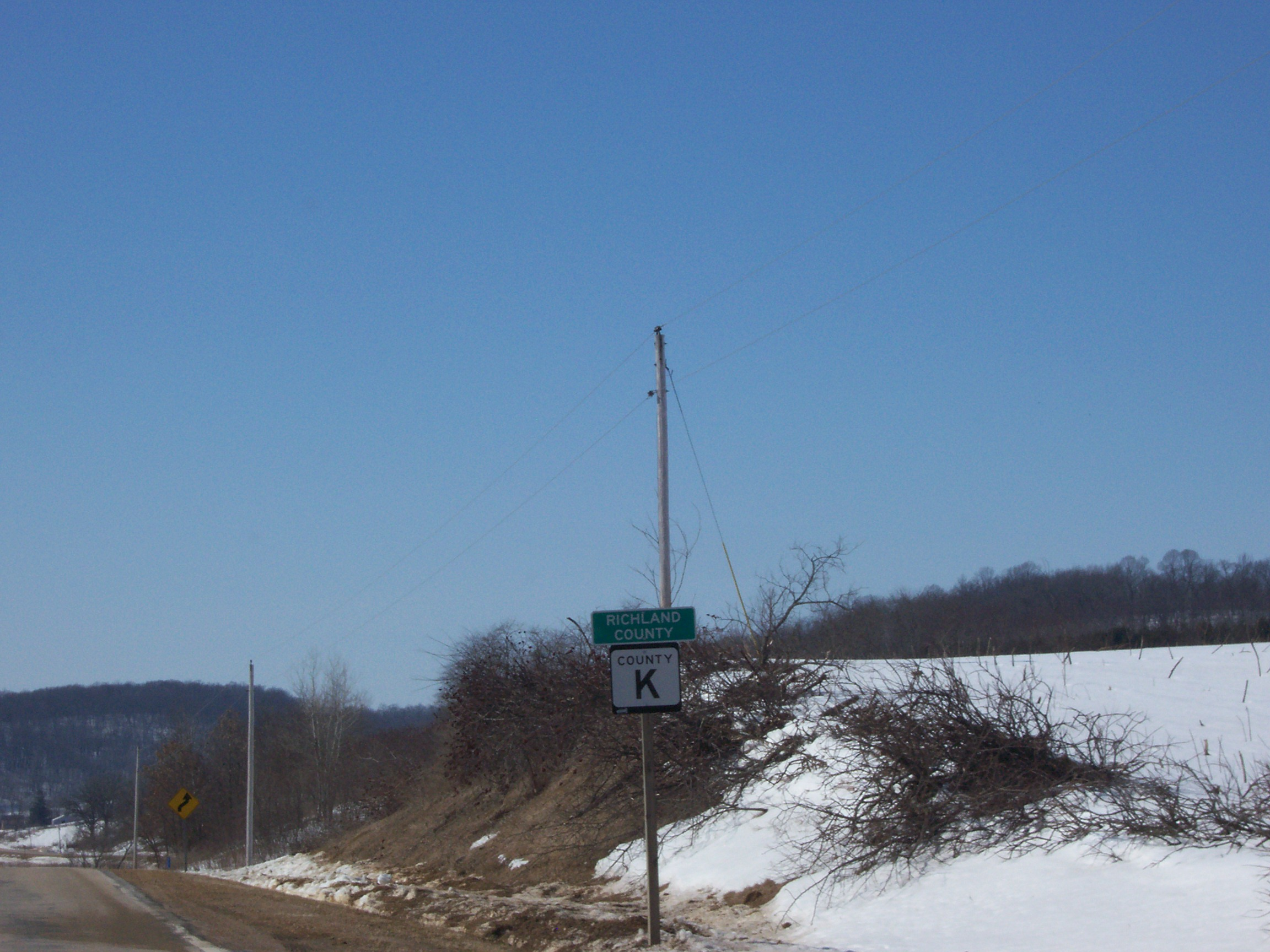
Sign marking entrance into Richland County, with countryside in background

As of the census of 2000, there were 17,924 people, 7,118 households, and 4,833 families residing in the county. The population density was 31 people per square mile (12 people/km^{2}). There were 8,164 housing units at an average density of 14 units per square mile (5.4 units/km^{2}). The racial makeup of the county was 98.39% White, 0.15% Black or African American, 0.26% Native American, 0.21% Asian, 0.03% Pacific Islander, 0.28% from other races, and 0.68% from two or more races. 0.93% of the population were Hispanic or Latino of any race. 37.7% were of German, 12.5% Norwegian, 10.3% Irish, 9.5% English and 8.8% American ancestry. 97.1% spoke English, 1.1% German, and 1.1% Spanish as their first language.

There were 7,118 households, out of which 30.50% had children under the age of 18 living with them, 56.30% were married couples living together, 7.70% had a female householder with no husband present, and 32.10% were non-families. 27.20% of all households were made up of individuals, and 13.40% had someone living alone who was 65 years of age or older. The average household size was 2.48 and the average family size was 3.01.

In the county, the population was spread out, with 25.20% under the age of 18, 8.40% from 18 to 24, 25.50% from 25 to 44, 23.70% from 45 to 64, and 17.20% who were 65 years of age or older. The median age was 39 years. For every 100 females there were 98.20 males. For every 100 females age 18 and over, there were 94.90 males.

== Communities ==
=== City ===
- Richland Center (county seat)

=== Villages ===
- Boaz
- Cazenovia (partly in Sauk County)
- Lone Rock
- Viola (partly in Vernon County)
- Yuba

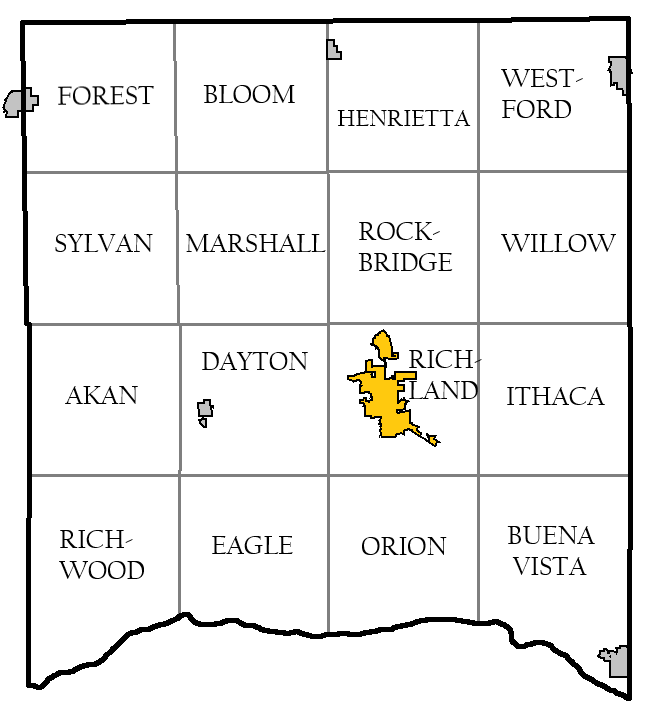
Towns of Richland County

=== Towns ===
- Akan
- Bloom
- Buena Vista
- Dayton
- Eagle
- Forest
- Henrietta
- Ithaca
- Marshall
- Orion
- Richland
- Richwood
- Rockbridge
- Sylvan
- Westford
- Willow

=== Census-designated places ===
- Gotham
- Sextonville

=== Unincorporated communities ===
- Ash Ridge
- Aubrey
- Balmoral
- Basswood
- Bear Valley
- Bloom City
- Bosstown
- Buck Creek
- Bunker Hill
- Byrds Creek
- Eagle Corners
- Excelsior
- Five Points
- Germantown
- Gillingham
- Hub City
- Ithaca
- Jimtown
- Keyesville
- Loyd
- Neptune
- Nevels Corners
- Orion
- Port Andrew
- Rockbridge
- Sabin
- Sand Prairie
- Sylvan
- Tavera
- Tunnelville (partial)
- Twin Bluffs
- West Lima
- Westport
- Wild Rose
- Woodstock

=== Ghost towns/neighborhoods ===
- Ashford
- Corwin
- Henrietta
- McGrew
- Mill Creek

== Politics ==
United States presidential election results for Richland County, Wisconsin
Year	Republican		Democratic		Third party(ies)	
Year	No.	%	No.	%	No.	%
1892	2,194	49.99%	1,670	38.05%	525	11.96%
1896	2,636	54.03%	2,098	43.00%	145	2.97%
1900	2,593	59.51%	1,524	34.98%	240	5.51%
1904	2,698	61.51%	1,340	30.55%	348	7.93%
1908	2,464	54.83%	1,689	37.58%	341	7.59%
1912	1,623	41.01%	1,493	37.72%	842	21.27%
1916	2,051	48.56%	1,845	43.68%	328	7.77%
1920	3,952	77.04%	917	17.88%	261	5.09%
1924	2,669	42.11%	898	14.17%	2,771	43.72%
1928	5,685	70.87%	2,262	28.20%	75	0.93%
1932	3,256	43.79%	4,027	54.16%	152	2.04%
1936	4,245	48.87%	4,080	46.97%	361	4.16%
1940	5,527	60.48%	3,524	38.56%	88	0.96%
1944	5,088	61.85%	3,109	37.79%	29	0.35%
1948	3,836	55.55%	2,990	43.30%	80	1.16%
1952	6,605	74.42%	2,260	25.46%	10	0.11%
1956	5,062	64.29%	2,783	35.34%	29	0.37%
1960	5,253	63.84%	2,965	36.03%	11	0.13%
1964	3,224	42.71%	4,315	57.17%	9	0.12%
1968	4,141	59.82%	2,288	33.05%	493	7.12%
1972	5,062	66.14%	2,492	32.56%	100	1.31%
1976	4,466	54.13%	3,634	44.04%	151	1.83%
1980	4,601	53.57%	3,413	39.74%	574	6.68%
1984	4,858	62.66%	2,844	36.68%	51	0.66%
1988	4,026	52.23%	3,643	47.26%	39	0.51%
1992	3,144	36.81%	3,458	40.49%	1,938	22.69%
1996	2,642	36.58%	3,502	48.49%	1,078	14.93%
2000	3,994	48.16%	3,837	46.27%	462	5.57%
2004	4,836	51.34%	4,501	47.78%	83	0.88%
2008	3,298	39.03%	5,041	59.66%	111	1.31%
2012	3,573	41.28%	4,969	57.41%	113	1.31%
2016	4,013	49.73%	3,569	44.23%	487	6.04%
2020	4,871	54.04%	3,995	44.32%	148	1.64%
2024	5,207	55.85%	3,985	42.74%	131	1.41%

Richland County has been a Republican-leaning county for most of its existence, only backing Democratic candidates six times and never giving them a vote share of more than 60%.

== See also ==
- COVID-19 trends for Richland County
- National Register of Historic Places listings in Richland County, Wisconsin
