= Port Andrew, Wisconsin =

- Unincorporated community
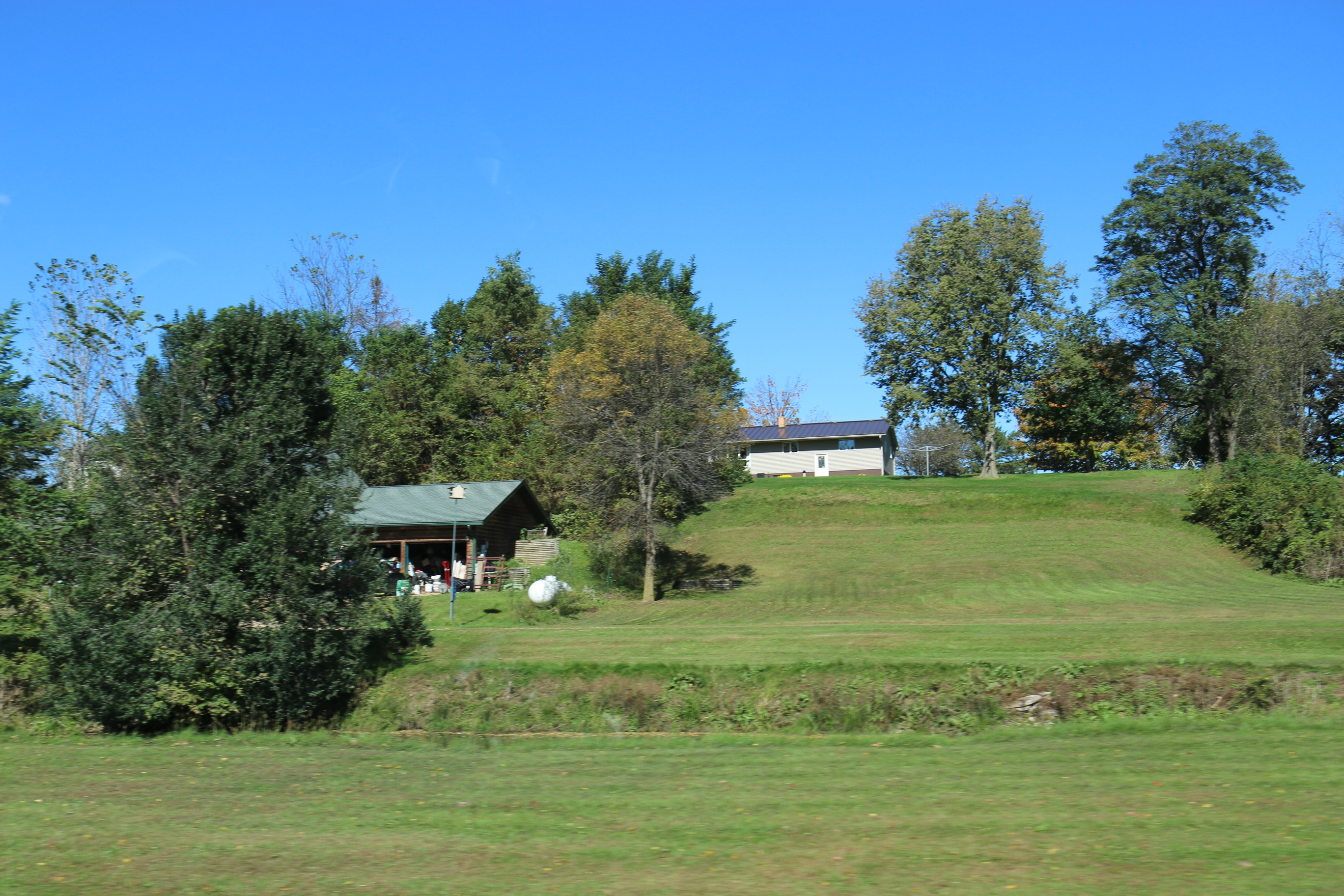
- Housing in Port Andrew

- Location within Wisconsin Location within the United States
- Coordinates: 43°12′26″N 90°34′02″W
- Country: United States
- State: Wisconsin
- County: Richland
- Elevation: 686 ft (209 m)
- Time zone: UTC-6 (Central (CST))
  - Summer (DST): UTC-5 (CDT)
- Area code: 608
- GNIS feature ID: 1571794

Port Andrew is an unincorporated community in the town of Richwood, Richland County, Wisconsin, United States.

== Images ==
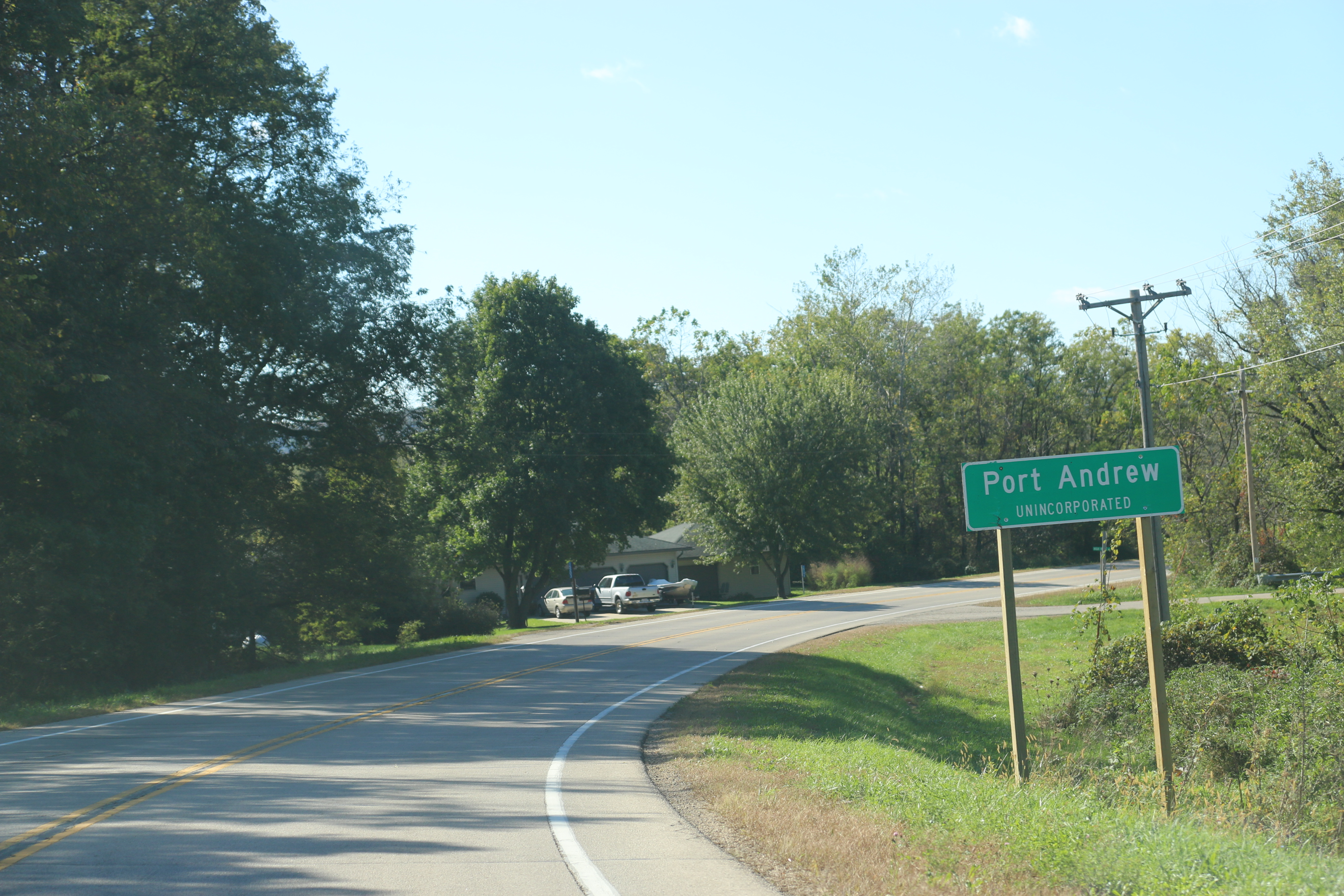
Sign for Port Andrew on WIS60

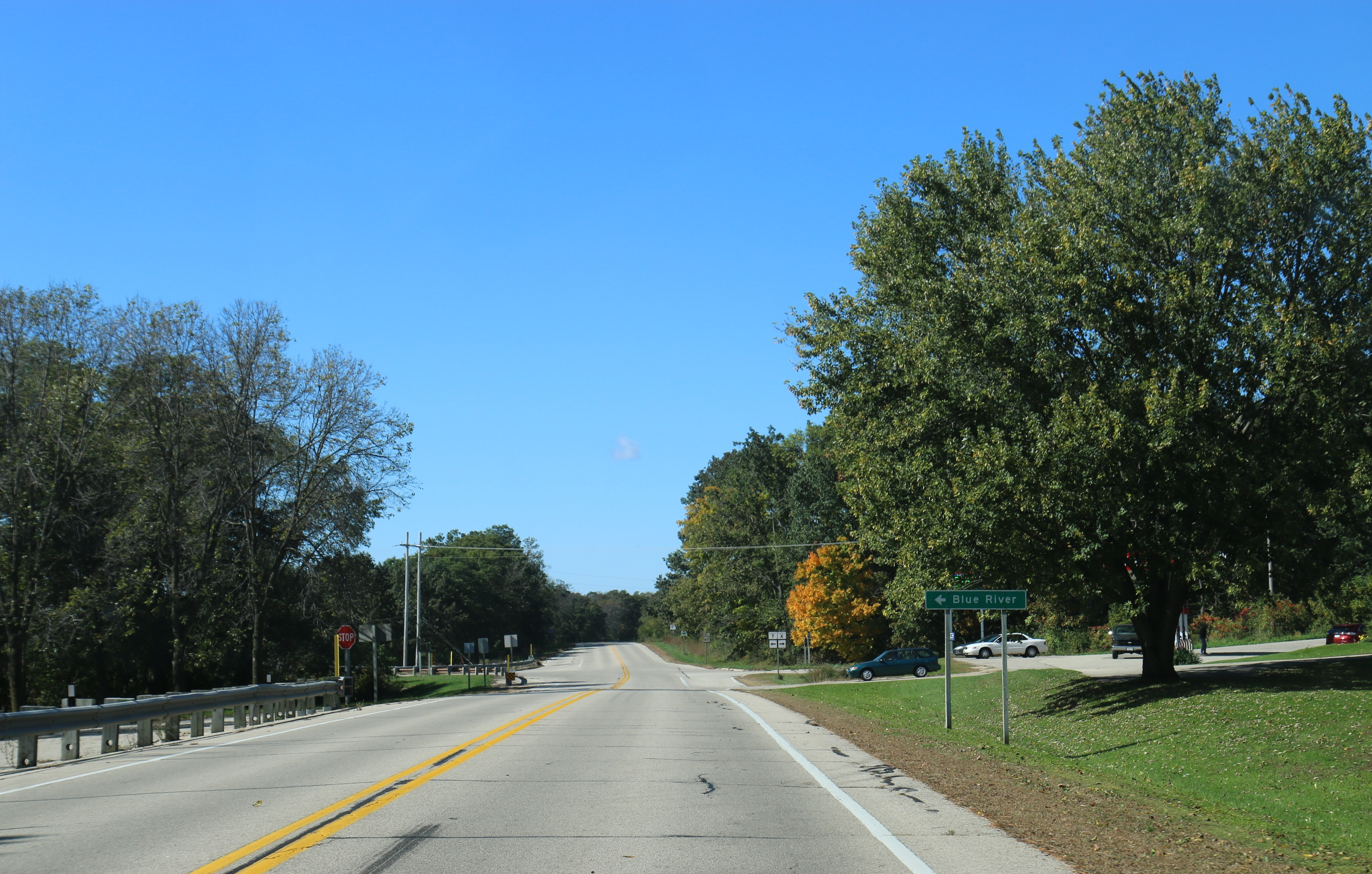
Wisconsin Highway 60
