= Rockbridge, Wisconsin =

- Town
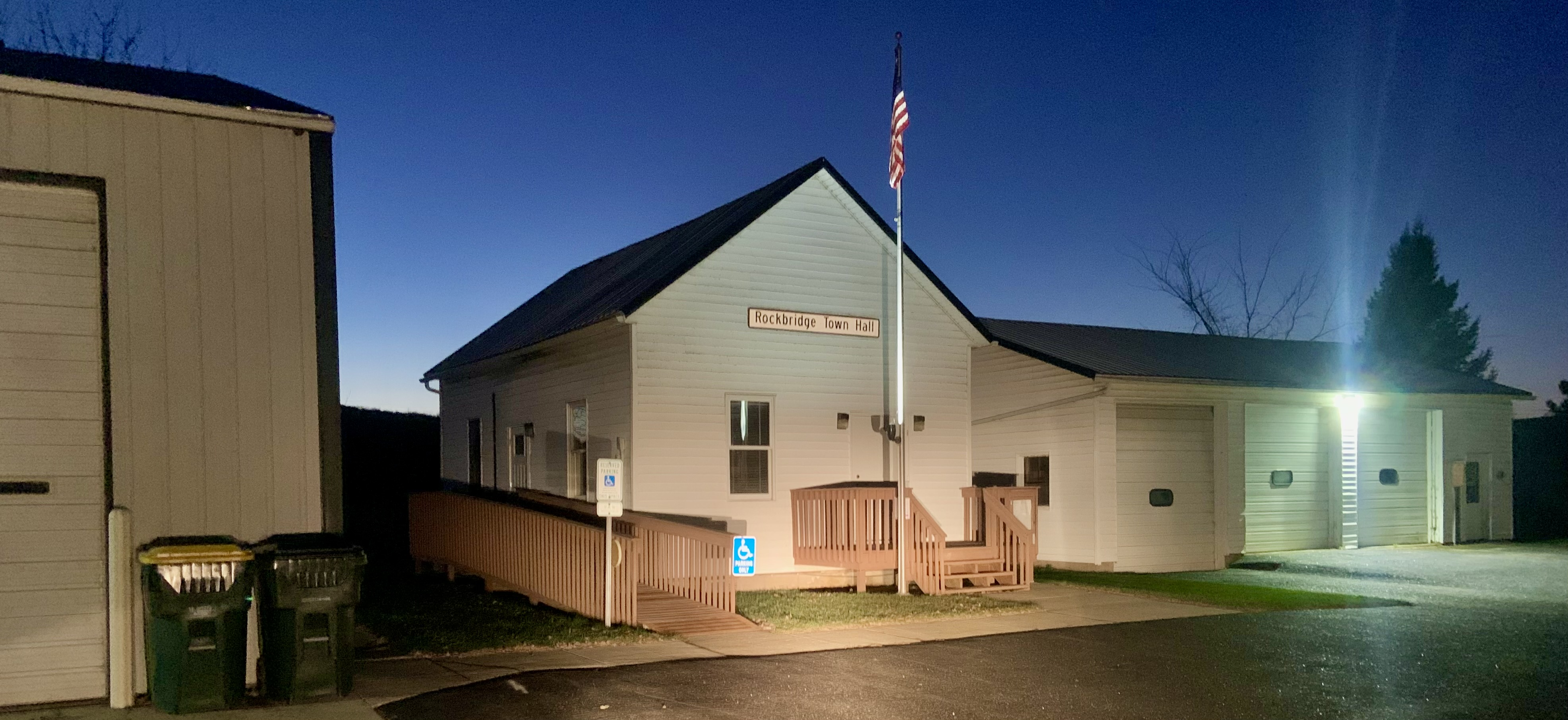
- Town hall

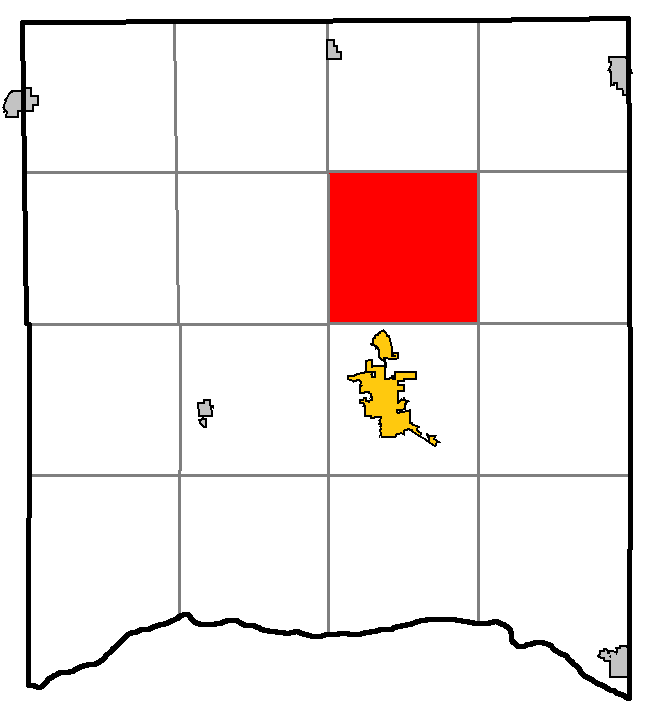
- Location of Rockbridge, Wisconsin

- Location of Richland County, Wisconsin
- Coordinates: 43°25′51″N 90°22′2″W
- Country: United States
- State: Wisconsin
- County: Richland

Area
  - Total: 36.2 sq mi (93.7 km^{2})
  - Land: 36.2 sq mi (93.7 km^{2})
  - Water: 0 sq mi (0.0 km^{2})
- Elevation: 820 ft (250 m)

Population (2020)
  - Total: 697
  - Density: 19.3/sq mi (7.44/km^{2})
- Time zone: UTC-6 (Central (CST))
  - Summer (DST): UTC-5 (CDT)
- Area code: 608
- FIPS code: 55-68675
- GNIS feature ID: 1584050
- Website: https://townofrockbridge.wi.gov/

Rockbridge is a town in Richland County, Wisconsin, United States. The population was 697 at the 2020 census. The unincorporated communities of Rockbridge and Buck Creek are located in the town.

== Geography ==
According to the United States Census Bureau, the town has a total area of 36.2 square miles (93.7 km^{2}), of which 36.2 square miles (93.7 km^{2}) is land and 0.03% is water.

Pier Park lies along the west side of the village of Rockbridge, and the Pine River runs through the park; this park contains a natural rock bridge across the river. The town was named after this natural feature. The park has two historical markers: one indicating the unique rock formation and the other recognizing its significance as a campsite during the Black Hawk War of 1832.

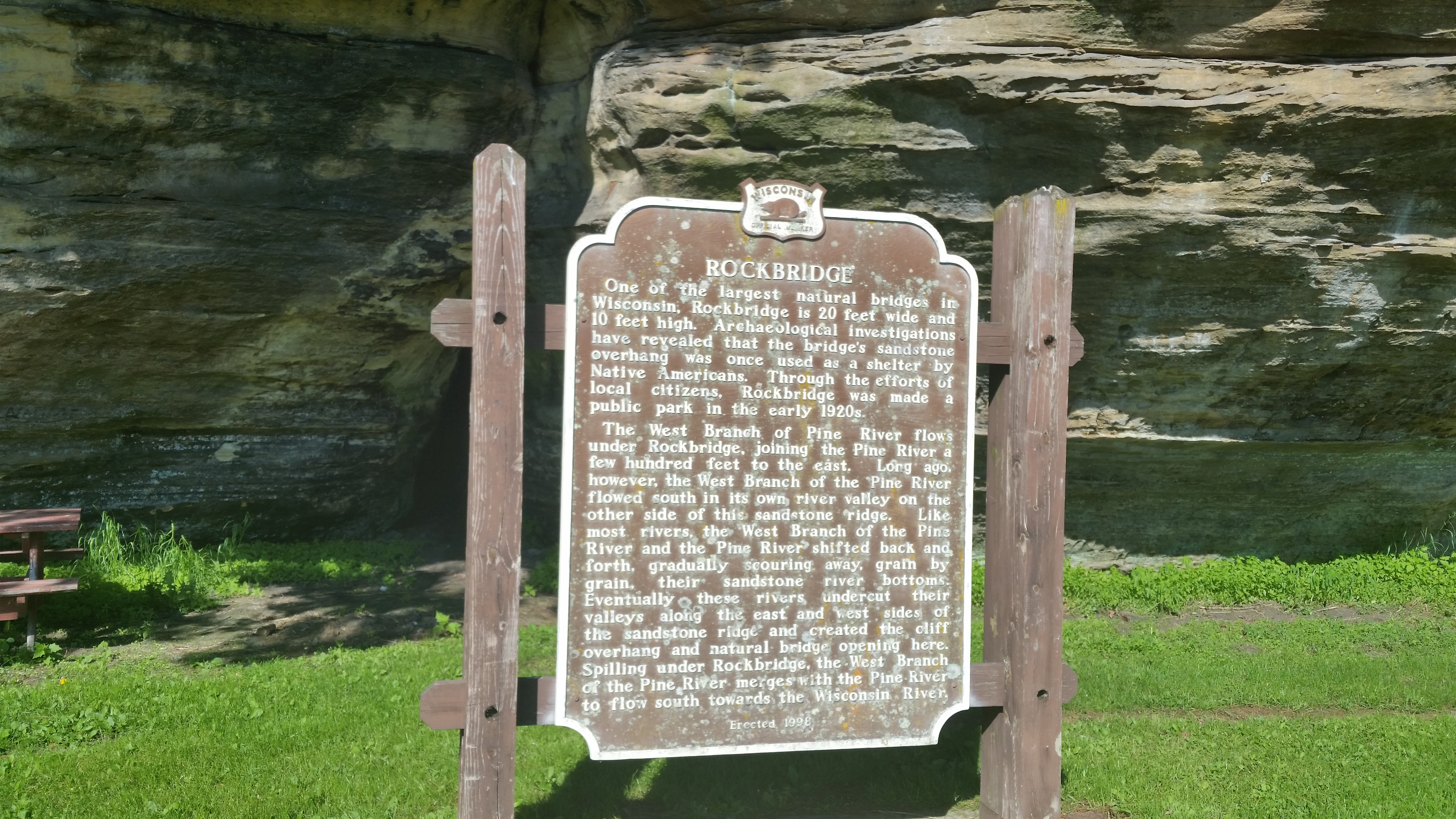
Rockbridge, WI historical marker

== Demographics ==
As of the census of 2000, there were 721 people, 263 households, and 201 families residing in the town. The population density was 19.9 people per square mile (7.7/km^{2}). There were 315 housing units at an average density of 8.7 per square mile (3.4/km^{2}). The racial makeup of the town was 98.06% White, 0.69% African American, 0.14% Native American, 0.14% Asian, and 0.97% from two or more races. Hispanic or Latino of any race were 1.11% of the population.

There were 263 households, out of which 37.3% had children under the age of 18 living with them, 70.0% were married couples living together, 4.6% had a female householder with no husband present, and 23.2% were non-families. 19.8% of all households were made up of individuals, and 10.3% had someone living alone who was 65 years of age or older. The average household size was 2.74 and the average family size was 3.17.

In the town, the population was spread out, with 30.7% under the age of 18, 4.3% from 18 to 24, 23.7% from 25 to 44, 27.6% from 45 to 64, and 13.7% who were 65 years of age or older. The median age was 41 years. For every 100 females, there were 110.8 males. For every 100 females age 18 and over, there were 100.8 males.

The median income for a household in the town was $41,563, and the median income for a family was $45,804. Males had a median income of $30,556 versus $21,042 for females. The per capita income for the town was $17,269. About 6.9% of families and 8.5% of the population were below the poverty line, including 14.3% of those under age 18 and 9.4% of those age 65 or over.
