= List of Wisconsin suffragists =

This is a list of Wisconsin suffragists, suffrage groups and others associated with the cause of women's suffrage in Wisconsin.

== Groups ==
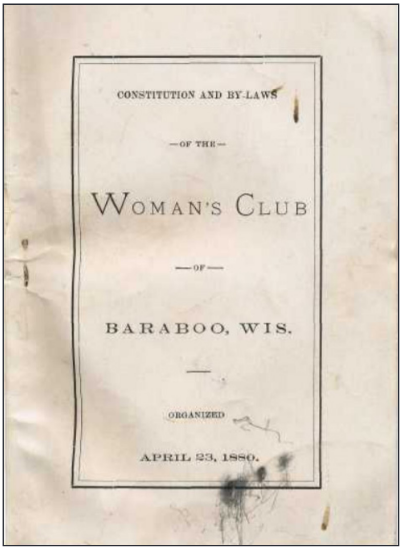
Woman's Club of Baraboo Wisconsin, 1880

- Centralia Equal Suffrage Association, founded in 1882.
- Grand Rapids Equal Suffrage Association, founded in 1882.
- Madison Equal Suffrage Association (MESA), founded in 1879.
- Marathon County Woman Suffrage Association, founded in 1879.
- Men's League for Women's Suffrage, formed in 1911.
- Mukwonago Woman Suffrage Association, founded in 1880.
- National Woman's Party branch, founded in 1917.
- Olympic Club, founded in 1882 in Milwaukee.
- Political Equality League, formed in 1911.
- Political Equality League, African American branch in Milwaukee.
- Richland Center Women's Club, organized in 1870.
- South Side Woman Suffrage Association, founded in 1882 in Milwaukee.
- Whitewater Woman Suffrage Club, founded in 1882.
- Woman's Club of Baraboo, Wisconsin.
- Woman Suffrage Association at Mosinee, founded in 1882.
- Woman Suffrage Association of Wisconsin (WSAW), founded in 1869. Later, in 1882, it is known as the Wisconsin Woman Suffrage Association (WWSA).

== Suffragists ==
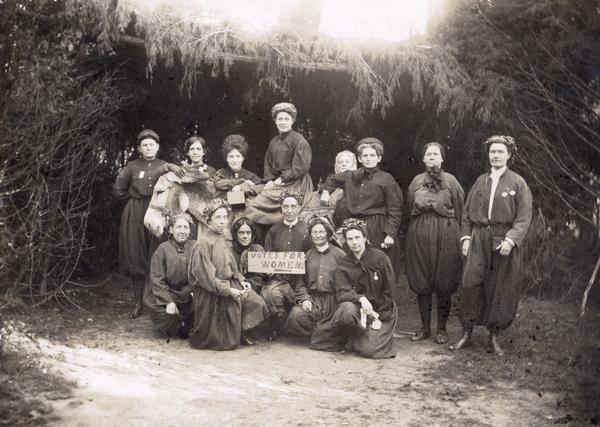
"Bloomer Girls" support women's suffrage, c. 1903

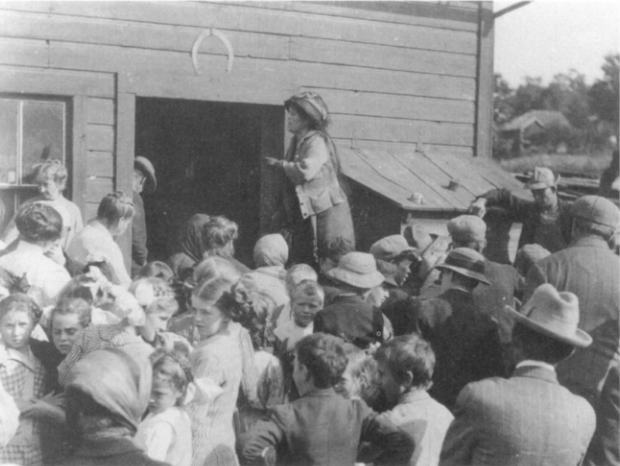
Belle Case La Follette speaking in Blue Mounds, Wisconsin, in 1915

- Mathilde Franziska Anneke (Milwaukee)
- Harriet Bain (Kenosha)
- Stella Baker (Suffragist) (Dexterville)
- Emma Curtiss Bascom (Madison)
- John Bascom (Madison)
- Mary W. Bentley (Marathon)
- Meta Berger (Milwaukee)
- Emma Brown (Fort Atkinson)
- Olympia Brown (Racine)
- Vie H. Campbell (Evansville)
- Carrie Chapman Catt (Ripon)
- Augusta Chapin (Milwaukee)
- Helen Holmes Charleton (Broadhead)
- Edna Phillips Chynoweth (Madison)
- Clara Bewick Colby (Madison)
- Alice B. Curtis (Milwaukee)
- James Densmore (Oshkosh)
- Mary A. Derrick (Brodhead)
- Emma Smith DeVoe
- Martha Parker Dingee (Racine)
- Nellie Donaldson
- Marion V. Dudley (Milwaukee)
- Almah Jane Frisby (Milwaukee)
- Zona Gale (Portage)
- Lavinia Goodell (Janesville)
- Hattie Tyng Griswold (Columbus)
- Sophie Gudden (Grand Rapids)
- Helen H. Haight (Waukesha)
- Alura Collins Hollister (Mukwonago)
- Jessie Jack Hooper (Oshkosh)
- Carrie S. Cook Horton (Milwaukee)
- Ada James (Richland Center)
- Laura Briggs James (Richland Center)
- Sarah James (Oshkosh)
- Rachel Szold Jastrow (Madison)
- Charlotte Jordan (Kenosha)
- Mabel Judd (Lancaster)
- Angie King (Janesville)
- Georgiana J. Koppke (Baraboo)
- Belle Case La Follette (Summit, Baraboo, Madison)
- Fola La Follette (Madison)
- Lucinda Lake (Juda)
- Jessie Luther (Madison)
- Henry Doty Maxon (Menominee)
- Maud Leonard McCreery (Green Bay)
- Helen Farnsworth Mears (Oshkosh)
- Sarah Munro (Milwaukee)
- Meda Neubecker (Waukesha)
- Helen R. Olin (Madison)
- Nellie Mann Opdale (La Crosse)
- Hanna Patchin (New London)
- Mary G. Pearce (Milwaukee)
- Lila Peckham (Milwaukee)
- Nora Perkins (Milwaukee)
- Susan Miller Quackenbush (Portage)
- Sarah A. Richards (Milwaukee)
- Emma Robinson (Kenosha)
- Jane Rogers (Milwaukee)
- Ellen Alida Rose
- Mary Stebbins Savage (Porter; Milwaukee)
- Lutie Stearns (Milwaukee)
- Sophie Stathearn (Kaukauna)
- Vandalia Varnum Thomas
- Mary Swain Wagner (Milwaukee)
- Frances McDonnell Wentworth (Racine)
- Pauline Wies (Milwaukee)
- Gwendolen Brown Willis (Milwaukee)
- Eliza Wilson (Menomonee)
- Belle Winestine (Madison)
- Laura Ross Wolcott (Milwaukee)
- Edna Wright (Milwaukee)
- Theodora W. Youmans (Waukesha)

=== Politicians who supported women's suffrage ===
- David Cooper Ayres (Howard) 1872 Wisconsin Blue Book "Universal Suffrage, (Female inclusive)"
- Victor L. Berger (Milwaukee)
- John T. Dow
- Lucius Fairchild
- Hamilton H. Gray (Lafayette County)
- David G. James (Richland Center)
- Robert La Follette
- William C. Whitford

== Places ==
- Jessie Jack Hooper House.

== Publications ==
- Die Deutsche Frauen-Zeitung.
- Oshkosh True Democrat.
- Southport Telegraph.
- Wisconsin Chief.
- Wisconsin Citizen.

== Suffragists campaigning in Wisconsin ==
- Susan B. Anthony.
- Henry Browne Blackwell.
- Carrie Chapman Catt.
- Emma Smith DeVoe.
- Crystal Eastman.
- Margaret Foley.
- Lydia Folger Fowler.
- Harriet Grim.
- Mary E. Haggart.
- Elizabeth Boynton Harbert.
- Julia Ward Howe.
- Elizabeth A. Kingsbury.
- Mary Livermore.
- Alice Ball Loomis.
- Catharine Waugh McCulloch.
- Clarina I. H. Nichols.
- Maud Wood Park.
- Elizabeth Lyle Saxon.
- Nancy Schoonmaker.
- May Wright Sewall.
- Anna Howard Shaw.
- Elizabeth Cady Stanton.
- Lucy Stone.
- Alice L. Thompson Waytes.

== See also ==
- Timeline of women's suffrage in Wisconsin
- Women's suffrage in Wisconsin
- Women's suffrage in states of the United States
- Women's suffrage in the United States
