= Women's suffrage in Wisconsin =

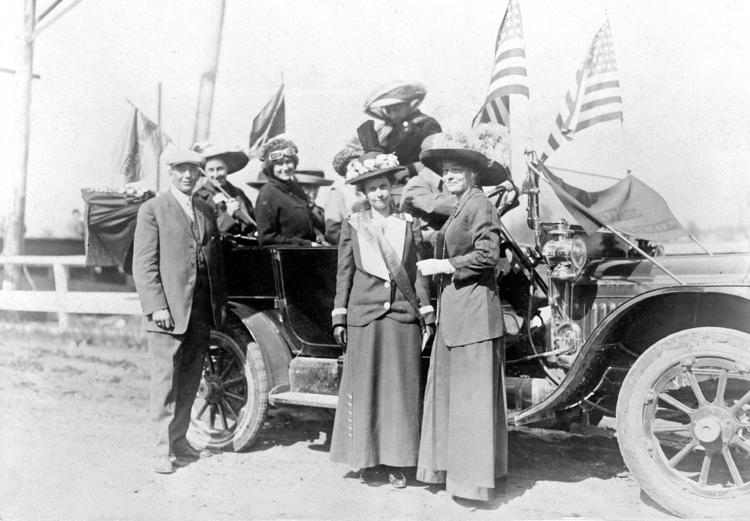
Suffragists campaigning in Wisconsin, June 7, 1916

Attempts to secure women's suffrage in Wisconsin began before the Civil War. In 1846, the first state constitutional convention delegates for Wisconsin discussed women's suffrage and the final document eventually included a number of progressive measures. This constitution was rejected and a more conservative document was eventually adopted. Wisconsin newspapers supported women's suffrage and Mathilde Franziska Anneke published the German language women's rights newspaper, Die Deutsche Frauen-Zeitung, in Milwaukee in 1852. Before the war, many women's rights petitions were circulated and there was tentative work in forming suffrage organizations. After the Civil War, the first women's suffrage conference held in Wisconsin took place in October 1867 in Janesville. That year, a women's suffrage amendment passed in the state legislature and waited to pass the second year. However, in 1868 the bill did not pass again. The Wisconsin Woman Suffrage Association (WWSA) was reformed in 1869 and by the next year, there were several chapters arranged throughout Wisconsin. In 1884, suffragists won a brief victory when the state legislature passed a law to allow women to vote in elections on school-related issues. On the first voting day for women in 1887, the state Attorney General made it more difficult for women to vote and confusion about the law led to court challenges. Eventually, it was decided that without separate ballots, women could not be allowed to vote. Women would not vote again in Wisconsin until 1902 after separate school-related ballots were created. In the 1900s, state suffragists organized and continued to petition the Wisconsin legislature on women's suffrage. By 1911, two women's suffrage groups operated in the state: WWSA and the Political Equality League (PEL). A voter referendum went to the public in 1912. Both WWSA and PEL campaigned hard for women's equal suffrage rights. Despite the work put in by the suffragists, the measure failed to pass. PEL and WWSA merged again in 1913 and women continued their education work and lobbying. By 1915, the National Woman's Party also had chapters in Wisconsin and several prominent suffragists joined their ranks. The National Woman Suffrage Association (NAWSA) was also very present in Wisconsin suffrage efforts. Carrie Chapman Catt worked hard to keep Wisconsin suffragists on the path of supporting a federal woman's suffrage amendment. When the Nineteenth Amendment went out to the states for ratification, Wisconsin an hour behind Illinois on June 10, 1919. However, Wisconsin was the first to turn in the ratification paperwork to the State Department.

== Pre-Civil War ==
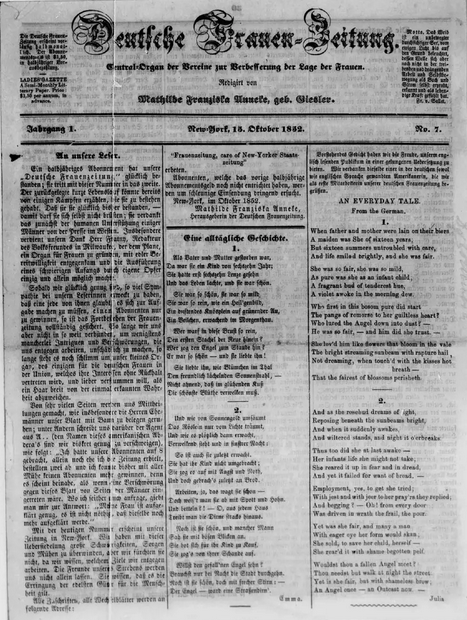
Die Deutsche Frauen-Zeitung, October 15, 1852

The first state constitutional convention for Wisconsin met on October 5, 1846. Delegates to the convention proposed giving African Americans, Native Americans, and immigrants in the process of becoming citizens the right to vote. James Magone of Milwaukee proposed that the word "male" be removed from the qualifications for a voter. Delegate Moses M. Strong objected to including women voters with Black male voters, but Magone refused to change the language in his proposal and it was not included in the end. The proposed constitution did, however, grant the right to married women to independently control their own property. Unfortunately, it was voted down in a referendum election held on April 6, 1847. The next constitution was more conservative and did not contain women's rights issues.

Mathilde Franziska Anneke founded a German language women's rights newspaper in Milwaukee in 1852 called Die Deutsche Frauen-Zeitung. Two early newspapers, the Telegraph in Kenosha and the Oshkosh True Democrat also supported women's suffrage. The True Democrat was run by James Densmore, who publicly supported the vote for women and challenged other newspaper editors to do the same.

Early women's suffrage proponents in Wisconsin were also involved in the abolition and temperance movements. In 1853 temperance activists, Clarina I. H. Nichols and Lydia Folger Fowler, toured the state and also talked about the importance of the vote for women. Lucy Stone spoke on both abolition and women's suffrage in several Wisconsin towns, including Madison, in 1855. Stone urged women who came to her lectures to petition the legislature. Petitions were written, and three of these were brought to the legislature by a senator from Kenosha County, C. C. Sholes in 1856. However, the petitions did not lead to any legislation in the state Senate. In the state House, Hamilton H. Gray from Lafayette County introduced a limited women's suffrage bill, but it was unsuccessful. Stone may also have inspired the creation of a woman's suffrage group organized in Janesville before the Civil War, but meeting records have been lost. During the Civil War, women in Wisconsin organized relief groups to aid the war effort.

== Early efforts ==
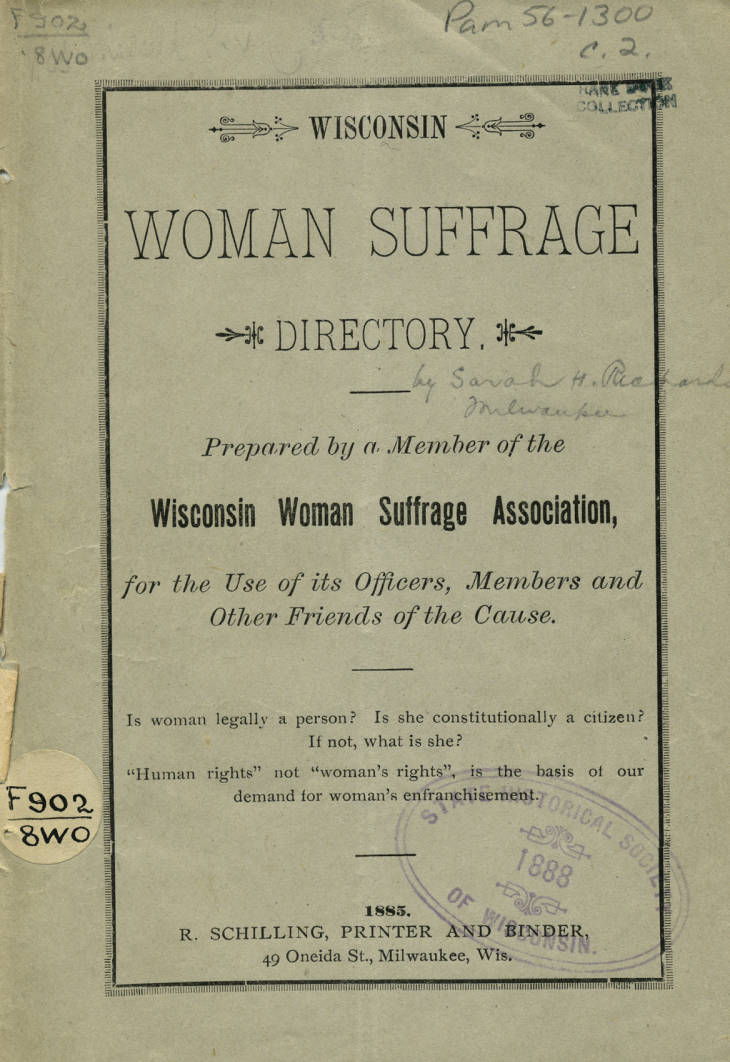
Wisconsin Woman Suffrage Directory, 1885

The Impartial Suffrage Convention was held in Janesville during October 9 and 10, 1867. It was the first time that activists for the women's vote met statewide and was organized by a group of men and women from different parts of the state. One of the organizers of the Impartial Suffrage Convention, John T. Dow from Rock County, introduced a joint resolution in the state legislature. It passed both houses and was signed on April 11, 1867. All amendments to the Wisconsin Constitution had to be passed by two different legislative sessions. The next year, the same women's suffrage amendment bill was introduced into the state legislation by William C. Whitford. Dow helped support the bill as a lobbyist, since he was no longer part of the legislature. To support the efforts, the Woman Suffrage Association of Wisconsin (WSAW) was organized in Janesville. Despite this effort, the bill did not pass a second time, meaning it couldn't become a state amendment. WSAW was a short-lived group, that ended when the amendment failed.

Another state convention was held in Milwaukee in 1869 on February 24–25. Anneke had called for a convention to be held in the city and it was arranged by Lila Peckham and Laura Ross Wolcott and included speakers Susan B. Anthony, Mary Livermore, and Elizabeth Cady Stanton. The convention helped re-energize the suffrage movement in Wisconsin. At the convention, the Wisconsin Woman Suffrage Association (WWSA) was formed.

By 1870, there were chapters of WWSA in several Wisconsin towns and cities. The Richland Center Women's Club, organized in 1870 by Laura James, was actually created as "cover" for women's suffrage work in the city. Wolcott served as the president of WWSA. Starting in the 1880s, the WWSA began to hold annual meetings in different places throughout the state. Olympia Brown served as the president for several years, with Emma C. Bascom taking a turn of one year in 1884 with Brown resuming the presidency again the next year. Women's suffrage lectures and conventions were also held in the 1880s. A women's suffrage referendum passed both state houses in 1880, but did not pass in the next year.

In 1884, a referendum bill passed, giving women right to vote for education-related candidates. Alura Collins Hollister, who worked on legislative issues for WWSA, helped ensure the passage of the bill for the second time in 1885. In 1886, the electorate voted in favor of the education suffrage referendum, making it law. However, because of the phrasing of the new law giving women the right to vote at "any election pertaining to school matters," there was lot of confusion. In 1887, the Wisconsin Citizen began publication, originally to help educate new women voters. The paper was first edited by volunteer, Martha Parker Dingee of Racine. She not only worked as editor, but also did layout, collected subscriptions, and wrote columns. Other women also mobilized in 1887 to encourage women to vote in the next municipal election. Brown left her work as a reverend, and committed herself entirely to advocating for the vote. Speakers from outside the state came to help bolster the lecture circuit.

On the day of the first time women could vote in Wisconsin, April 1887, the Attorney General of Wisconsin, Charles E. Estabrook ordered that women's ballots be thrown out in places where he expected a large turnout of women voters. Brown's vote was outright rejected in Racine. She had voted on municipal issues, arguing that these issues affected school. Brown took the issue to the courts in order to create a test case for the new law. The case went to the Supreme Court of Wisconsin, where it was decided that women were allowed to vote for all candidates on the ballot as long as there were also "school related matters" on the same ballot. This decision was appealed to the Supreme Court of the United States where the decision was changed to specify that women could only vote on school issues, not on other issues on the ballot. In 1889 another case challenged the issue of women voting only on school issues which led to women being disenfranchised for several more years. In 1901, the state legislature created separate ballot boxes for women. Women were able to finally vote again for school issues on April 1, 1902. The legal fights for the vote put the suffragists into debt.

== A continuing fight ==
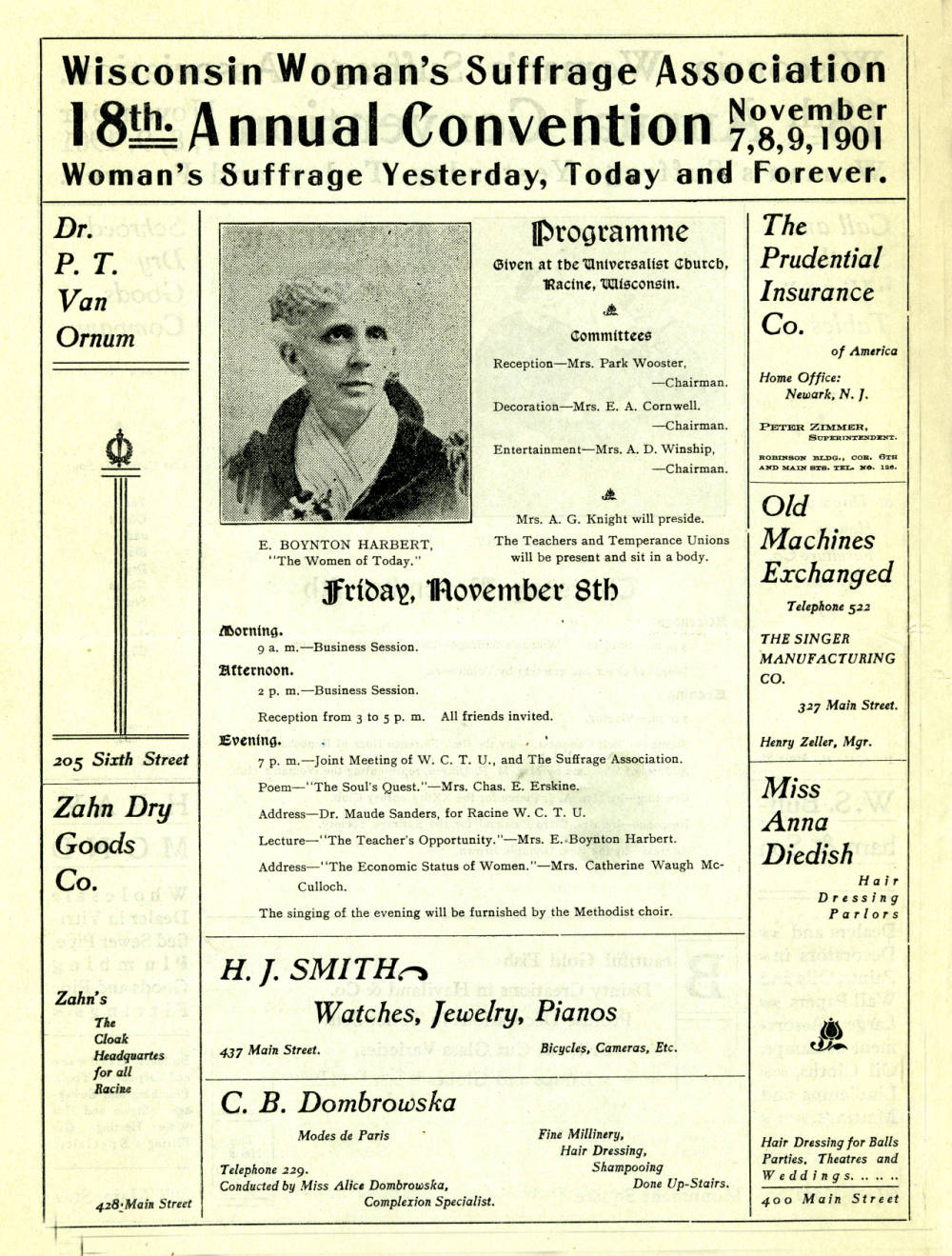
Wisconsin Woman's Suffrage Association (WWSA) convention newsletter, November 1901

In 1890, Theodora W. Youmans began to encourage activists to form women's suffrage clubs in Waukesha, using the Waukesha Freeman newspaper as a platform. In 1890, the first convention of the Wisconsin Federation of Women's Clubs (WFWC) saw delegates from the Waukesha Women's Club in attendance. This club had expressed early support for women's rights and later, Youmans served as president.

During an open house at the Manona Lake Assembly in 1896 Anna Howard Shaw lectured in front of an audience of around 4,000 people. Women's suffrage headquarters were set up in the State House in Madison in 1902. The headquarters were in charge of distributing suffrage literature and also collected information on suffrage supporters in the state. Suffragists shared the "Tax Paying Woman's Pledge" throughout the state, which reinforced the idea that women should not be forced to pay taxes if they could not vote.

Maud Wood Park was brought to Wisconsin in 1908 by Brown and spoke and helped set up suffrage groups at several colleges. At the end of 1909, WWSA helped circulate a petition for a federal women's suffrage amendment. Within six weeks, they had collected more than 18,000 signatures on the petitions. One octogenarian, Mrs. Wentworth, collected 1,000 names herself. Another women's suffrage organization, the Political Equality League (PEL), was formed in 1911 with Ada James as president. This group was created by members who wanted a more active organization. Youmans did public relations for PEL.

Both PEL and WWSA campaigned for the new voter referendum on women's suffrage that was put out by the state legislature in 1911. The two organizations had many differences, but were able to cooperate and share ideas for the state campaign to encourage voters to support women's suffrage. Harriet Grim, an organizer from the National American Woman Suffrage Association (NAWSA), came to Wisconsin to help organize activists. Campaign headquarters were set up in Milwaukee by the summer of 1911. When the state ruled that PEL and WWSA could only spend $10,000 each per campaign, suffragists organized the Wisconsin Men's League for Women's Suffrage to help raise money. The Men's League also helped increase the number of speakers available and added "prestige" to the suffrage publicity campaign. Literature that was distributed during the campaign was translated into several languages and suffrage groups were formed of German language, Polish language, Norwegian language, and Yiddish language speakers.

Belle Case La Follette and her daughter, Fola, became involved in the campaign. During the campaign, La Follette spoke on women's suffrage throughout the state, seven days a week, several times day. La Follette influenced first both PEL and WWSA to organize on the grassroots level. They contacted women of influence to host suffrage meetings in their hometowns and the state suffrage groups provided speakers. Suffragists also spoke to labor unions and promised that low wages would end when women could vote. The grassroots approach also helped suffragists reach out to working class women, and women who stayed at home.

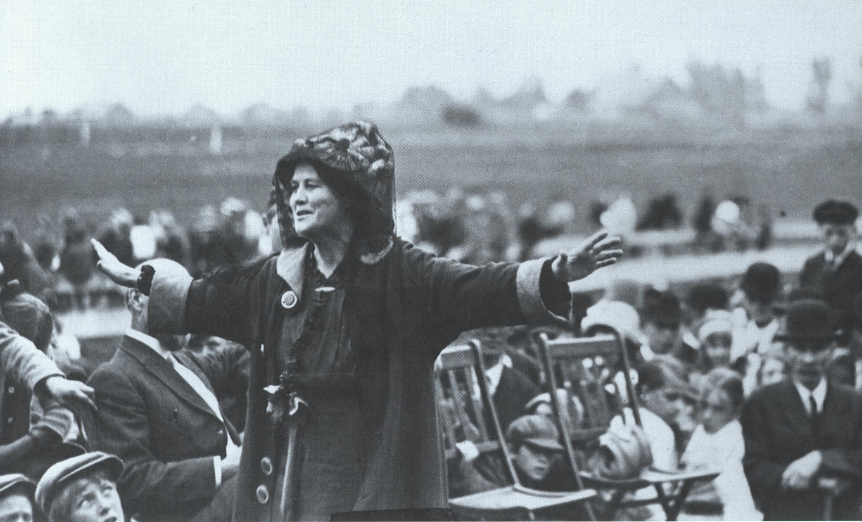
Belle Case La Follette speaks in Fox River, Wisconsin in 1912

Suffragists also showed the film, Votes for Women, featuring Jane Addams, throughout the state. Using cars in the Wisconsin suffrage campaigns was also extremely popular. The first auto tour started in Milwaukee on August 2, 1911, and visited eight counties to the south. Car tours helped build publicity and gave local suffrage groups something to campaign around. Women in the tours used the cars themselves as a speaking platform and often wore matching yellow tunics. A "Votes for Women" boat tour on the Wolf River also took place. Buffalo Bill Cody also helped the cause when he visited Green Bay, with a suffrage banner carried by his Wild West circus. The suffragists visited county fairs and set up suffrage booths to get out their message and answer questions. The Wisconsin State Fair in 1911 had a Woman's Day which included special programs and exhibits relating to women's suffrage. During the State Fair Dan Patch, a famous pacing horse, carried a "Votes for Women" banner. Al Ringling was hired by Georgina J. Koppke in Baraboo to create a multimedia women's suffrage production.

Before the election on November 4, 1912, suffragists mailed reminders to vote to individuals who had signed "pledge cards." They mailed out nearly 25,000 reminders. Pilot, Lincoln Beachey, was hired to drop suffrage fliers from an airplane at the 1912 Wisconsin State Fair. Advertisements were purchased and run in the newspapers. At Catholic Churches, around 35,000 leaflets were distributed. The ballots for women's suffrage were on a separate paper and were supposed to be pink. Some areas printed the ballots in white and some didn't receive the separate women's suffrage ballots. During the day of the vote, poll watchers were on hand and also passed out literature. Despite the effort put into the campaign, suffragists lost with 227,024 against and 135,545 for.

== Road to ratification ==
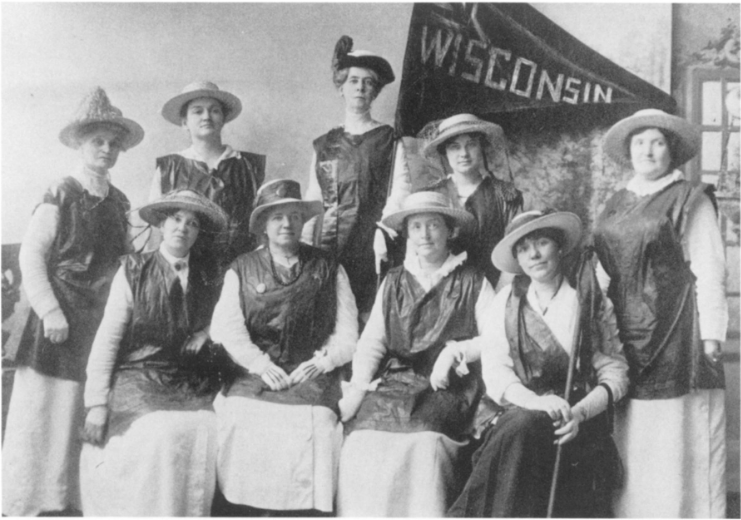
Waukesha suffragists, June 7, 1916

In January 1913, a joint convention of PEL and WWSA was called by Zona Gale and was held in Madison on February 4–5. The two groups merged and kept the name WWSA. Youmans was elected the new president. WWSA wanted to pursue another referendum campaign immediately. A women's suffrage referendum did pass in the state legislature, but the Governor vetoed it, worrying that the referendum was too close to the last one on women's suffrage. In 1913, Brown joined the National Advisory Council of the Congressional Union (CU, later known as the National Woman's Party). La Follett testified in front of the United States Senate Committee on Woman Suffrage on April 26, 1913.

In Madison, a Suffrage School was held in June 1914. The school had sixty-six women regular attendees, and hundreds of people listened to the suffrage lectures sponsored by the school. WWSA lobbied legislators for an unsuccessful voter referendum bill in 1915. Youmans also joined the CU by 1915. In the fall, she went to New York to do press work for their state voter referendum. After the failure of the voter referendum in New York, Youmans came back to Wisconsin where WWSA began to work towards a federal suffrage amendment. In June 1916, suffragists from Wisconsin marched alongside suffragists in Illinois in a parade down Michigan Avenue in Chicago. In the fall of 1916, Carrie Chapman Catt came to speak at the WWSA conference in Milwaukee. By fall of 1916, Youmans and other suffrage group presidents pledged to support the "Winning Plan" that Catt had devised for the National Woman Suffrage Association (NAWSA). Catt and NAWSA were going to push hard nationally for a federal suffrage bill. A women's suffrage referendum supported by WWSA in the state legislature was introduced. When Catt found out that WWSA had supported the state legislature, WWSA was censured and the suffragists in Wisconsin stopped lobbying for its success. The referendum failed in February 1917.

Before and during the United States entry into World War I, the suffragists in Wisconsin were divided over whether to support the war effort. The WWSA and the Wisconsin National Woman's Party tried to remain neutral, which was criticized and attacked by the press. German-American suffragists in Wisconsin faced anti-German sentiment. Catt's plan during wartime involved suffragists aiding the war effort, which put many Wisconsin suffragists who were also pacifists, in a difficult spot. Brown was one of the activists picketing the White House on March 4, 1917. Meta Berger hosted the first meeting of a NWP branch at her home on October 14, 1917. Berger left WWSA, angry that the organization went on to endorse the war. James and Gale also joined the NWP. Youmans, still in charge of WWSA, continued to work to support the war effort.

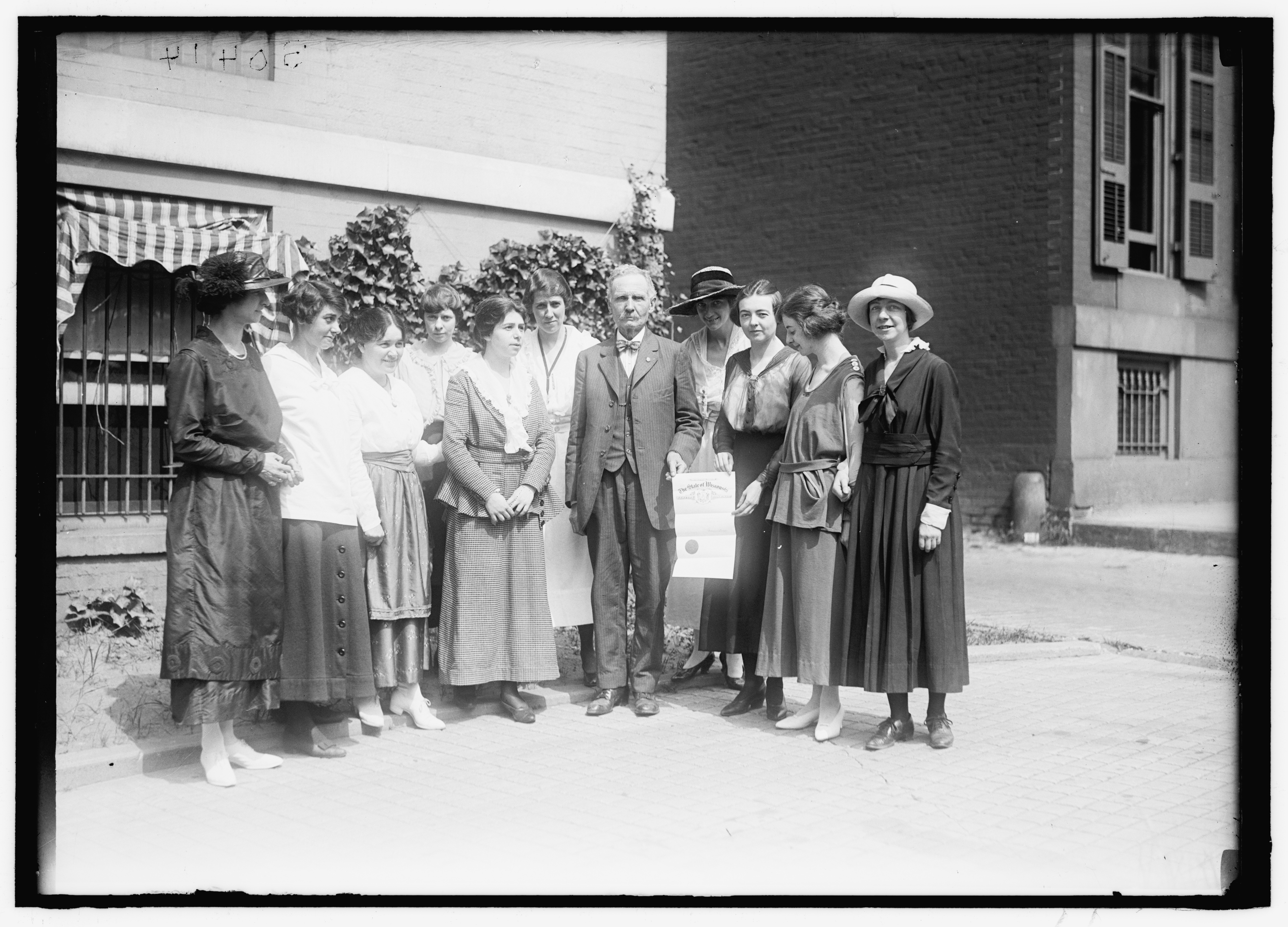
David G. James with ratification receipt, 1920

In January 1918, the United States House of Representatives passed the amendment that would go on to become the Nineteenth Amendment. WWSA member, Jessie Jack Hooper was on hand to lobby for NAWSA. During 1919, Youmans was called to Washington to lobby Congress on the women's suffrage amendment, which had to go through another legislative session where it passed both houses. After its passage, Youmans returned to Wisconsin to fight for the amendment's ratification. The states of Illinois and Wisconsin fought to become the first to ratify. On June 10, 1919, Wisconsin ratified the Nineteenth Amendment. The legislature of the state of Illinois beat Wisconsin to the ratification by one hour. David G. James was appointed Special Courier for the ratification papers by the governor. The Wisconsin Secretary of State, Merlin Hull, gave James money to travel. Ada James arrived at Madison with a packed suitcase for her father who immediately left for Washington, D.C. Wisconsin became the first state to finalize the ratification by turning in the paperwork to the State Department on June 13, 1919.

== African-American women's suffrage in Wisconsin ==
In Milwaukee, the Political Equality League (PEL) set up an African American chapter, with Carrie Horton as president. Alice L. Thompson Waytes of Boston campaigned for women's suffrage in Wisconsin in 1912. She also campaigned for the Progressive Party in Wisconsin.

White suffragist, Belle Case La Follette, publicly and strongly criticized racial segregation and also spoke in front of Black audiences. She printed her opinions in La Follette's Magazine. La Follette urged that there could be no peace in the country without racial equality. Her work had an effect on people around the country, both Black and white.

== Anti-suffragism in Wisconsin ==
Wisconsin had two major anti-suffrage groups, one in Madison and one in Milwaukee.

== See also ==
- List of Wisconsin suffragists
- Timeline of women's suffrage in Wisconsin
- Women's suffrage in states of the United States
- Women's suffrage in the United States
