= Timeline of women's suffrage in Wisconsin =

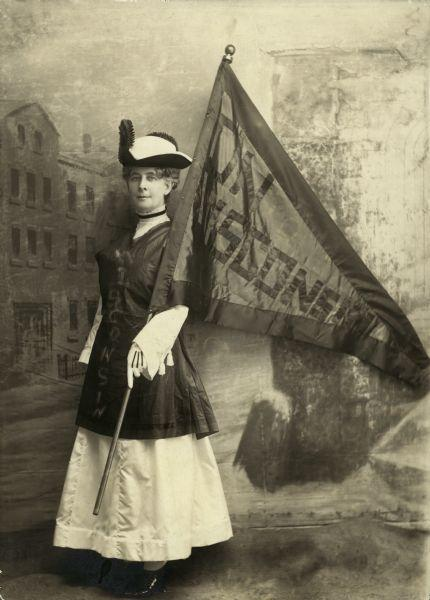
Old Wisconsin Flag, Theodore Youmans, 1915

This is a timeline of women's suffrage in Wisconsin. Women's suffrage efforts began before the Civil War. The first Wisconsin state constitutional convention in 1846 discussed both women's suffrage and African-American suffrage. In the end, a more conservative constitution was adopted by Wisconsin. In the 1850s, a German language women's rights newspaper was founded in Milwaukee and many suffragists spoke throughout the state. The first state suffrage convention was held in Janesville in 1867. The 1870s, several women's suffrage groups were founded in the state. In 1884, a women's suffrage bill, allowing women to vote for school-related issues is passed. In 1886, voters approve the school-related suffrage bill in a referendum. The first year women vote, 1887, there are challenges to the law that go on until Wisconsin women are allowed to vote again for school issues in 1902 using separate ballots. In the 1900s, women's suffrage conventions continue to take place throughout the state. Women collect petitions and continue to lobby the state legislature. In 1911 Wisconsin legislature passes a bill for women's suffrage that will go out to the voters in 1912. On November 4, 1912 voters disapprove of women's suffrage. Women's suffrage efforts continue, including sponsoring a suffrage school and with the inclusion of a National Woman's Party (NWP) chapter formed in 1915. When the Nineteenth Amendment goes out to the states, Wisconsin ratifies on June 10 and turns in the ratification paperwork first, on June 13, 1919.

== 19th century ==
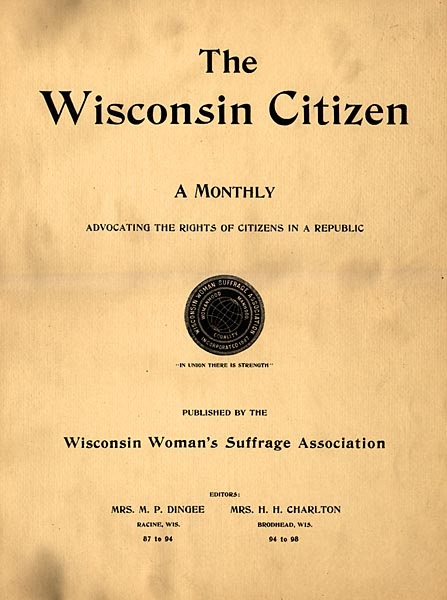
The Wisconsin Citizen, c. 1898

=== 1840s ===
1846

- October 5: Delegates of the 1846 Wisconsin Constitutional Convention start meeting in Madison. The final draft of the constitution had women's rights provisions and considered suffrage for African Americans.
- April: This version of the Wisconsin Constitution is rejected by voters.

=== 1850s ===
1852

- Woman's rights newspaper, Die Deutsche Frauen-Zeitung, is founded in Milwaukee by Mathilde Franziska Anneke.

1853

- Clarina I. H. Nichols and Lydia Folger Fowler tour Wisconsin and speak on temperance and women's suffrage.

1855

- November: Lucy Stone speaks about women's suffrage in Madison and Kenosha.

1856

- Women's suffrage club started in Richland Center.
- Three women's suffrage petitions are brought to the state legislature by Senator C. C. Sholes of Kenosha County.

=== 1860s ===
1867

- October 9–10: First state suffrage convention is held in Janesville.

1868

- The Woman Suffrage Association of Wisconsin (WSAW) is founded.

1869

- February 24–25: State suffrage convention is held in Milwaukee and arranged by Lila Peckham and Laura Ross Wolcott.

=== 1870s ===
1870

- State suffrage convention is held.

1878

- The Madison Equal Suffrage Association (MESA) is founded.

1879

- Organization of the Marathon County Woman Suffrage Association.

=== 1880s ===
1880

- May: Mukwonago Woman Suffrage Club is organized.
- A women's suffrage referendum passes both houses and waits to be passed again the next year.

1881

- The women's suffrage bill, passed in 1880, fails during the second vote.

1882

- September 7: State suffrage convention is held in Madison. The WSAW changes their name to the Wisconsin Woman Suffrage Association (WWSA).
- Centralia Equal Suffrage Association, Grand Rapids Equal Suffrage Association, Milwaukee Olympic Club, Milwaukee South Side Woman Suffrage Association, Whitewater Woman Suffrage Club, and Woman Suffrage Association at Mosinee are founded.

1884

- A bill passes the state legislature, giving women the right to vote for candidates relating to education.
- September: State suffrage club is held in Richland Center.

1885

- State suffrage meeting held in Whitewater.
- The suffrage bill passed in 1884 is passed again and will go out to a voter referendum.

1886

- State suffrage meeting is held in Racine.
- Fall: Voters approve the women's suffrage referendum, giving women the right to vote in education-related elections.

1887

- April: Attorney General of Wisconsin, Charles E. Estabrook instructs inspectors at polling places to throw out women's votes.
- Olympia Brown is turned away from voting in municipal elections.
- State suffrage meeting is held in Madison.
- Suffrage newspaper, the Woman Citizen begins publication.

1888

- January 31: The Wisconsin Supreme Court decides that the new education suffrage law means that women can vote for any candidate on ballots that contain school-related issues.
- State suffrage meeting is held in Stevens' Point.
- The Supreme Court of the United States reverses the Wisconsin Court, clarifying that women in the state can only vote on school issues, not other candidates.

1889

- Another case challenges the school-election law and women are effectively barred from voting for several years.

=== 1890s ===
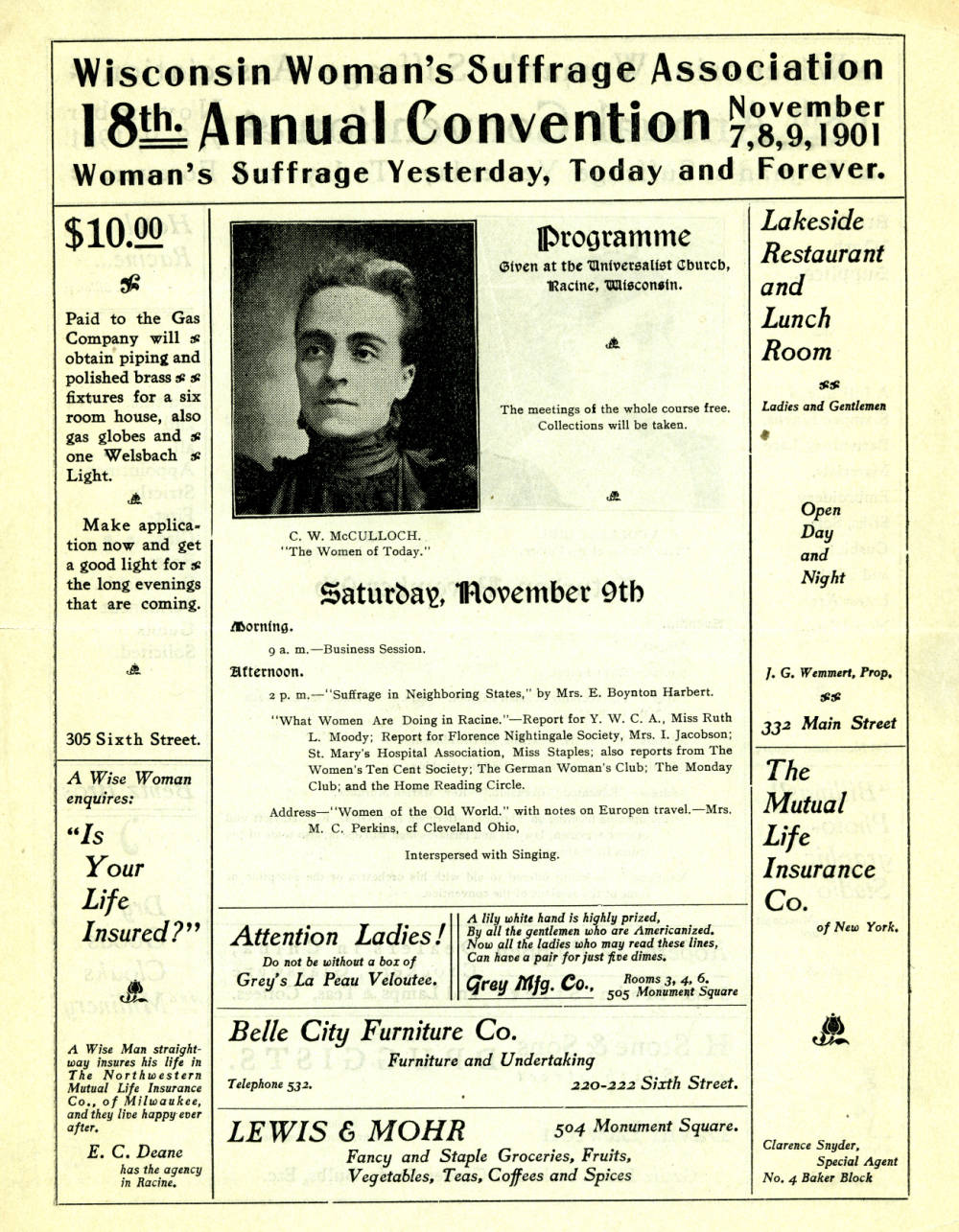
Wisconsin Woman's Suffrage Association (WWSA) convention newsletter, November 1901

1890

- Theodora W. Youmans uses the Waukesha Freeman as a platform to encourage women's clubs to form in Waukesha.
- State suffrage meeting is held in Berlin.

1891

- State suffrage meeting is held in Menominee.

1892

- State suffrage meeting is held in Richland Center.

1893

- State suffrage meeting is held in Mukwonago.

1894

- State suffrage meeting is held in Racine.

1895

- State suffrage meeting is held in Evansville.

1896

- State suffrage meeting is held in Waukesha.
- Ten day suffrage open house is held at Manona Lake Assembly where Anna Howard Shaw speaks to a group of around 4,000 people.

1897

- State suffrage meeting is held in Monroe.

1898

- State suffrage meeting is held in Spring Green.
- National suffrage convention held in Madison.

1899

- State suffrage meeting is held in Platteville.

== 20th century ==
=== 1900s ===
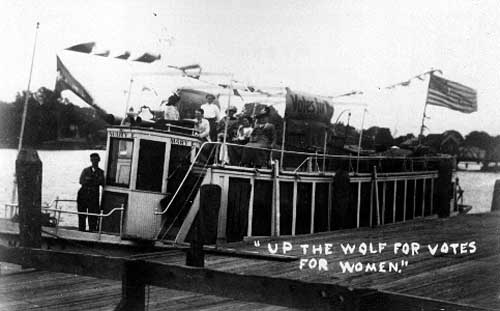
"Up the Wolf for Votes for Women"

1900

- State suffrage meeting is held in Brodhead.

1901

- Belle Case La Follette lobbies the state legislature to reinstate women's right to vote for school-related candidates and issues.
- Women are again allowed to vote on education-related issues because separate school ballot boxes are provided by law.
- State women's suffrage convention is held in Brodhead.

1902

- Headquarters for women's suffrage are opened in Madison.
- State women's suffrage convention is held in Madison.
- April 1: Women in Wisconsin vote again for school related issues on a separate ballot.

1903

- A municipal suffrage bill is introduced in the state legislature, but only gets a small vote.
- A full women's suffrage bill passes the state assembly, but not the state senate.
- State women's suffrage convention is held in Platteville.

1904

- State women's suffrage convention is held in Janesville.

1905

- The state assembly passes a municipal suffrage bill, but it fails in the state senate.
- State women's suffrage convention is held in Milwaukee.

1906

- State women's suffrage convention is held in Madison.

1907

- State women's suffrage convention is held in Madison.

1908

- State women's suffrage convention is held in Madison.
- Maud Wood Park tours several Wisconsin colleges and helps set up suffrage groups for college students.

1909

- State women's suffrage convention is held in Madison.
- WWSA circulates petitions for a federal women's suffrage amendment and collect more than 18,000 signatures.
- A bill for a referendum on women's suffrage passes in the state senate, but fails in the state assembly.

=== 1910s ===
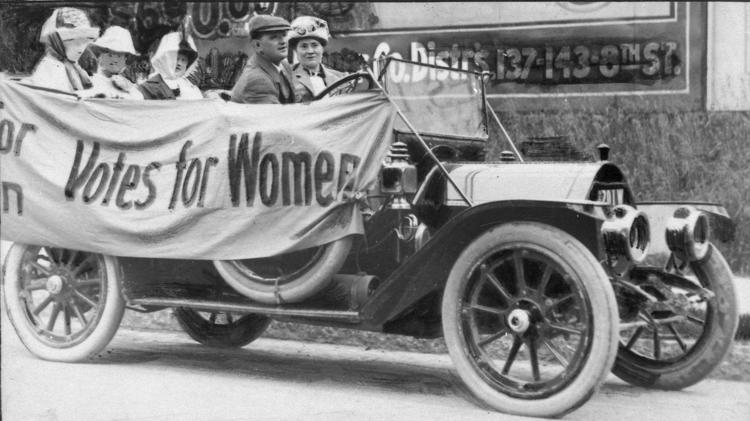
Suffragists from the Political Equality League in Milwaukee

1910

- State women's suffrage convention is held in Madison.

1911

- March 31: A suffrage bill passes the state senate.
- April 26: The suffrage bill passes the state assembly and will go to the voters as a political referendum in 1912.
- The Political Equality League (PEL) is organized.
- Wisconsin Men's League for Women's Suffrage formed.
- State women's suffrage convention is held in Racine.
- Summer: Campaign headquarters for the vote are set up in Milwaukee.
- August 2: State women's suffrage auto tour begins in Milwaukee.

1912

- November 4: The vote for women's suffrage fails in the referendum.

1913

- January: Zona Gale calls for a joint conference of PEL and WWSA.
- February 4–5: The joint convention is held in Madison.
- A women's suffrage referendum passes in the state legislature, but is voted by the governor.
- PEL and WWSA merge and keep the name WWSA.
- April 26: La Follett testifies in front of the United States Senate Select Committee on Woman Suffrage.

1914

- June 18–24: A suffrage school is held in Madison.
- December: State suffrage convention is held.

1915

- Several women's suffrage bills are introduced in the state legislature, but are unsuccessful.

1916

- March: A Congressional Conference is held in Milwaukee with Carrie Chapman Catt as featured speaker.
- June: Suffragists from Wisconsin march in the Chicago parade.

1917

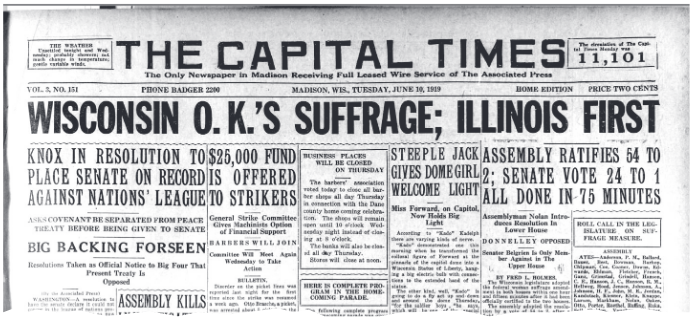
"Wisconsin O.K.'S Suffrage; Illinois First" June 10, 1919

- A National Woman's Party chapter is founded in Wisconsin.
- March 4: Olympia Brown from Wisconsin is one of the suffragists picketing the White House.
- A voter referendum bill is introduced in the state senate, but loses in the state assembly.

1919

- February: A bill to allow women to vote in the Presidential elections passes.
- June 10: Wisconsin ratifies the 19th Amendment.
- June 13: Wisconsin is the first state to complete the ratification process, turning in the papers to the Secretary of State.

=== 1920s ===
1920

- March: WWSA dissolves.
- The League of Women Voters (LWV) Wisconsin is formed.

== See also ==
- List of Wisconsin suffragists
- Women's suffrage in Wisconsin
- Women's suffrage in states of the United States
- Women's suffrage in the United States
