= Summit, Juneau County, Wisconsin =

Summit, Wisconsin
- Town
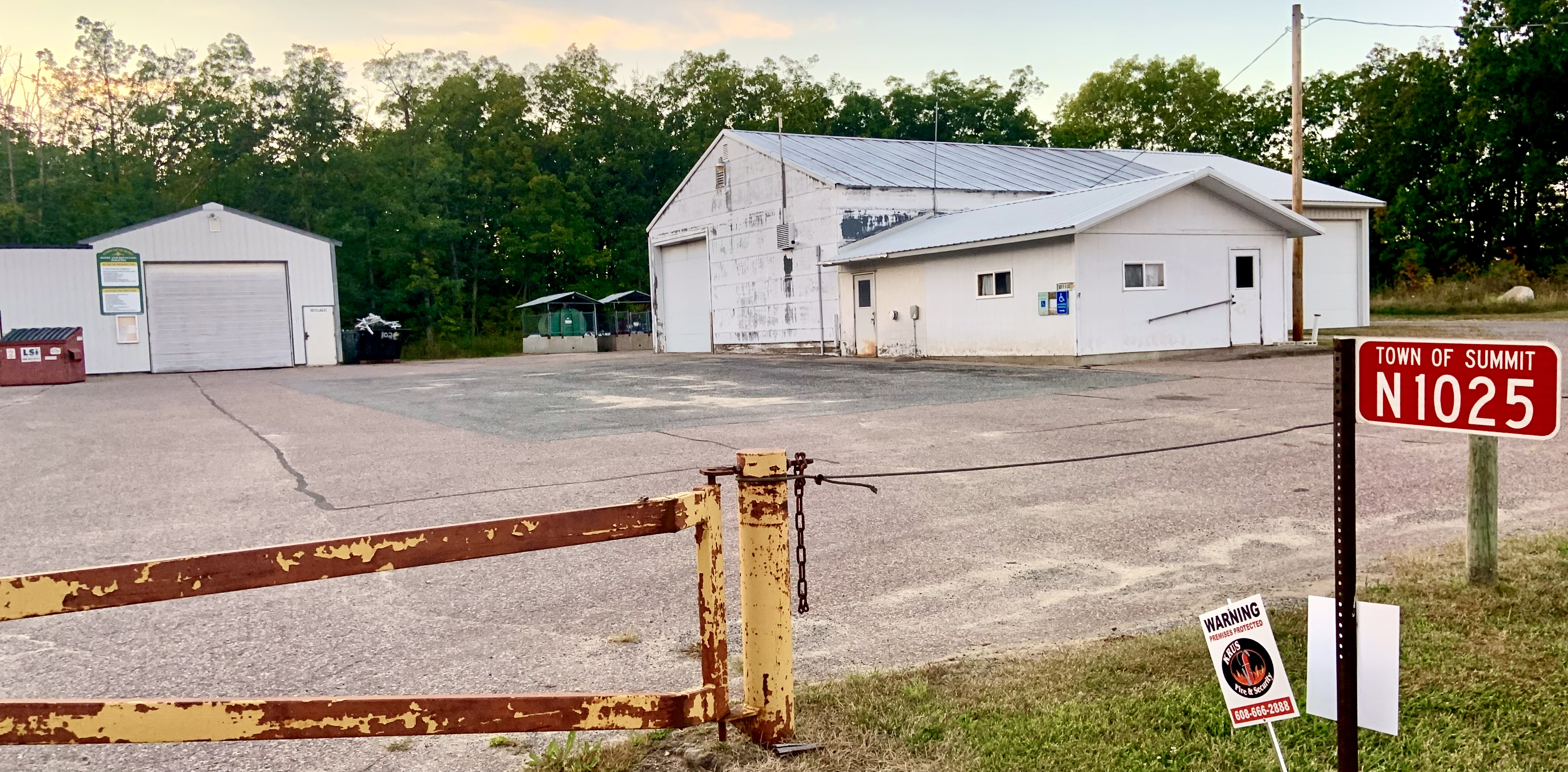
- Town hall

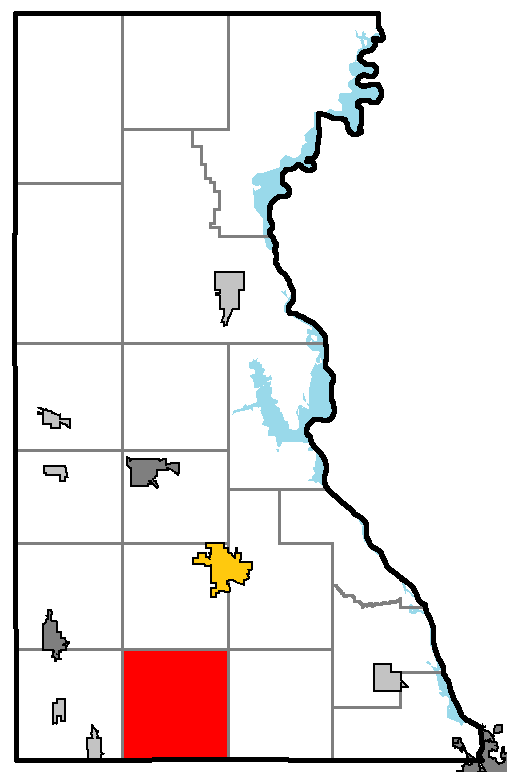
- Location of Summit, Juneau County

- Location of Juneau County, Wisconsin
- Coordinates: 43°41′4″N 90°8′12″W
- Country: United States
- State: Wisconsin
- County: Juneau

Area
  - Total: 36.9 sq mi (95.7 km^{2})
  - Land: 36.9 sq mi (95.6 km^{2})
  - Water: 0 sq mi (0 km^{2})
- Elevation: 1,142 ft (348 m)

Population (2020)
  - Total: 666
  - Density: 18.0/sq mi (6.97/km^{2})
- Time zone: UTC-6 (Central (CST))
  - Summer (DST): UTC-5 (CDT)
- Area code: 608
- FIPS code: 55-78300
- GNIS feature ID: 1584248
- Website: http://www.townofsummit.com/

Summit is a town in Juneau County, Wisconsin, United States. The population was 666 at the 2020 census.

== Geography ==
According to the United States Census Bureau, the town has a total area of 36.9 square miles (95.6 km^{2}), of which 36.9 square miles (95.6 km^{2}) is land and 0.03% is water.

== Demographics ==
As of the census of 2000, there were 623 people, 236 households, and 178 families residing in the town. The population density was 16.9 people per square mile (6.5/km^{2}). There were 262 housing units at an average density of 7.1 per square mile (2.7/km^{2}). The racial makeup of the town was 97.11% White, 0.8% African American, 0.16% Native American, 0.16% Asian, and 1.77% from two or more races. Hispanic or Latino people of any race were 0.48% of the population.

There were 236 households, out of which 34.3% had children under the age of 18 living with them, 65.7% were married couples living together, 6.4% had a female householder with no husband present, and 24.2% were non-families. 20.8% of all households were made up of individuals, and 9.3% had someone living alone who was 65 years of age or older. The average household size was 2.64 and the average family size was 3.05.

In the town, the population was spread out, with 27.8% under the age of 18, 5.1% from 18 to 24, 26.2% from 25 to 44, 25.5% from 45 to 64, and 15.4% who were 65 years of age or older. The median age was 40 years. For every 100 females, there were 112.6 males. For every 100 females age 18 and over, there were 113.3 males.

The median income for a household in the town was $35,536, and the median income for a family was $38,365. Males had a median income of $28,000 versus $21,094 for females. The per capita income for the town was $15,584. About 9.3% of families and 11.6% of the population were below the poverty line, including 14.4% of those under age 18 and 3.8% of those age 65 or over.

== Notable people ==
- Belle Case La Follette, attorney, suffragist, and wife of United States Senator and Wisconsin Governor Robert M. La Follette; born in Summit
- John Patterson, Civil War recipient of the Medal of Honor; lived in Summit
