= Alice L. Thompson Waytes =

Educator and public speaker (1870-1949)

- Born: 1870; Union County, South Carolina
- Died: October 19, 1949 (aged 78–79); Orangetown, New York
- Occupations: Public speaker and teacher

Alice L. Thompson Waytes (1870 - 1949) a.k.a. "Miss A.L.T. Waytes of Boston" was an African American educator and public speaker who campaigned for Black women's suffrage and the Progressive Party under Theodore Roosevelt.

== Biography ==
Waytes was born in 1870 in Union County, South Carolina. She spent her youth and teenage years in the capital, Columbia.

Waytes first graduated from the college preparatory program Benedict College in the 1890s. She completed missionary training courses at Shaw University in 1901, and then moved to Chicago to attend the Moody Bible Institute in 1904. The curriculum of the evangelical seminary focused on the Social Gospel through a two-year missionary training program. This is where she planted roots in the Black Chicago political scene. She helped establish the Frederick Douglass Center.

She taught at the Florida Institute at Live Oak until 1910, when she was appointed the superintendent of Bible school work for the Church Federation Society of New York.

In 1911, she became the pastor at Shiloh Baptist Church in West Medford, Massachusetts. This is where she became known as "Miss A.L.T. Waytes of Boston."

After her time at Shiloh Baptist Church, Waytes turned her attention to political activism. She was a campaign speaker for Teddy Roosevelt's Progressive Party in 1912, and for the Republican party in 1916. Her speeches around the country focused on votes for women.

She was selected by the party as a campaign speaker and spoke on its behalf in Illinois, Wisconsin, Minnesota, and Massachusetts, for which she received a letter of commendation from the former president.

In 1916, she was the chair of the Colored Women's National Republican Committee. She led the campaign for presidential nominee Charles Evans Hughes among Black women. Her first hand knowledge of southern racism and familiarity with the Chicago community gave her the background to support her strong oration skills.

Before the election of 1920, she was chosen as an Alternate Delegate for the 21st District of New York for Senator Hiram W. Johnson.

She continued speaking after the 19th amendment was ratified in 1920. After suffrage, her messages focused on more religious themes related to the Social Gospel than women's rights.

In 1934, she was living in Central Harlem. She was the director of the Salem Emergency Bureau.

In 1934, she faced health challenges that kept her at home. In 1940, she was a lodger in Queens, NY. She reported to the Census taker that she was a teacher but was unemployed for 52 weeks and looking for work.

=== Death and legacy ===
She died on October 19, 1949, in Orangetown, New York.

== Published works ==
- "The Hidden Fire" - pamphlet (1916)

== See also ==
- African-American women's suffrage movement
- Black suffrage in the United States
- List of Wisconsin suffragists
