= Die Deutsche Frauen-Zeitung =

Former German-language newspaper focusing on women

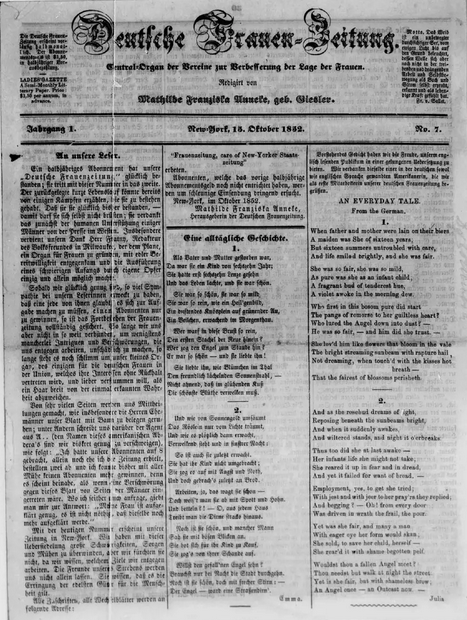
Die Deutsche Frauen-Zeitung, October 15, 1852

Die Deutsche Frauen-Zeitung (also known as Frauen-Zeitung, English: The German Woman's Journal) was a German language newspaper founded in 1852 by Mathilde Franziska Anneke in Milwaukee. The paper focused on women's rights issues and ran for around two and half years. It was one of the first feminist journals produced by a woman in the United States.

== History ==
Die Deutsche Frauen-Zeitung (also Frauen-Zeitung, English: German Woman's Journal) was first published in Milwaukee in March 1852. It was founded and edited by Mathilde Franziska Anneke and was one of the first feminist journals created by a woman in the United States. The publisher of another newspaper, the Volksfreund, gave Anneke space to publish the first issues of Frauen-Zeitung. The paper focused on women's rights issues. In May 1852, men in the publishing union asked that publishers remove women in the trade. This caused Anneke to tour several cities, including Buffalo, New York, Cleveland, Detroit, New York City, and more, to promote the paper. She began to publish the paper in New York and other cities by October 1852.

Frauen-Zeitung ran for around two and a half years. Anneke stopped publishing the paper when her health began to fail.

== See also ==
- The Lily
- The Una
- Women's suffrage in Wisconsin
