= Ada James =

American suffragist and social activist

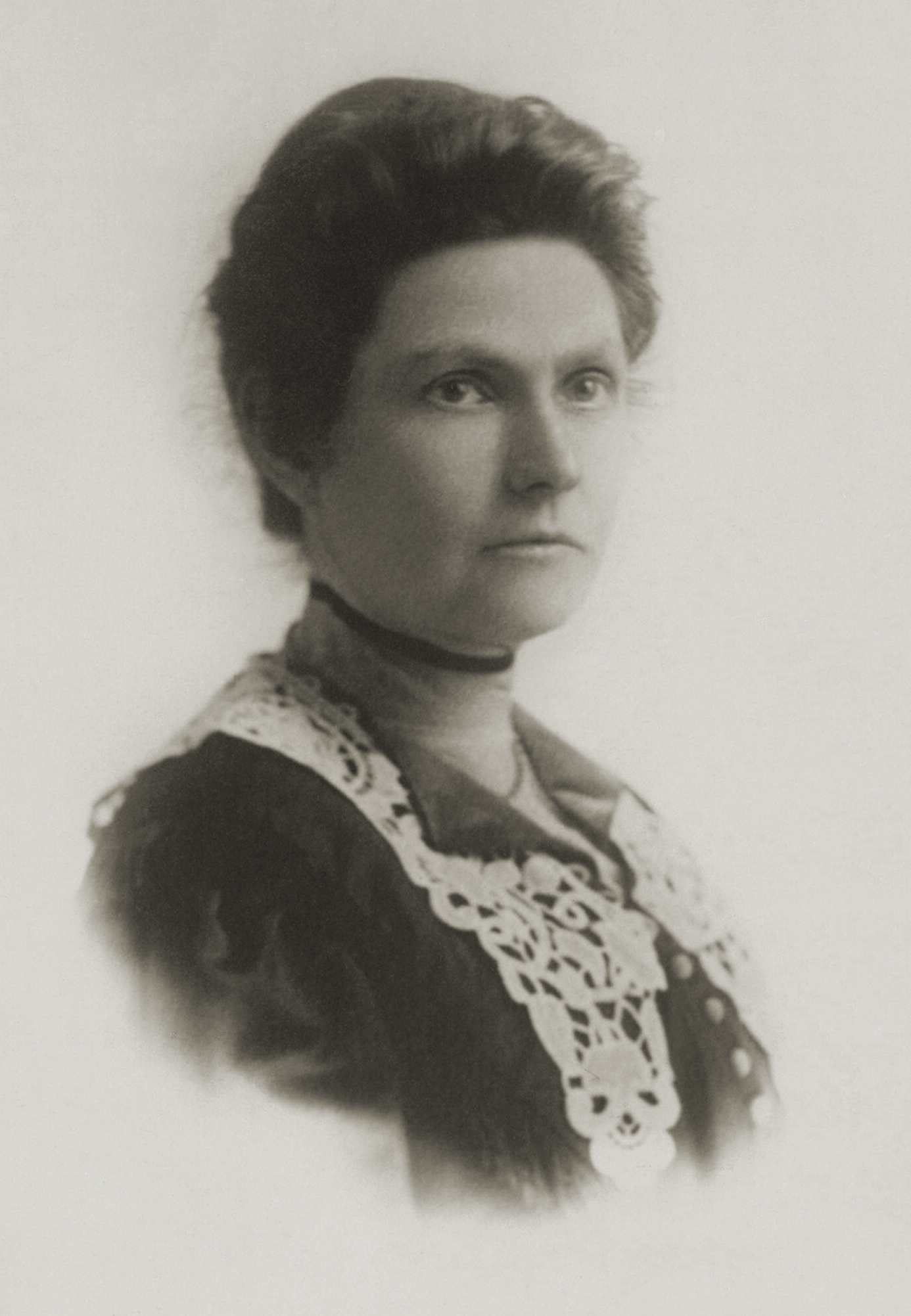
- Born: Ada Lois James; March 23, 1876; Richland Center, Wisconsin
- Died: September 29, 1952 (aged 76)
- Occupations: Suffragist, social activist

Ada Lois James (March 23, 1876 – September 29, 1952) was a suffragist, social worker, and reformer.

Born in Richland Center, Wisconsin, she graduated from high school in 1894, taught school for several years, and soon became active in the woman's suffrage movement in which both her parents played prominent roles.

In 1911, she became president of the new Political Equality League, holding this office until 1913 when the league was combined with the Wisconsin Woman's Suffrage Association under the leadership of Mrs. Henry Youmans. Ada James was active in many of the reform movements of the 1920s including pacifism, the advocacy of birth control, and prohibition. In 1922 she was vice-chairman of the Republican state central committee, and in 1923 was president of the Wisconsin Woman's Progressive Association but left the organization when Robert M. La Follette Sr. insisted on supporting Governor John J. Blaine.

During the 1920s, James was also engaged in a series of slander suits with Levi H. Bancroft growing out of her support of S. E. Smalley for the Republican nomination for a Wisconsin circuit judgeship. Active in social work, she administered the David G. James Memorial Fund established in 1922 for the relief of needy families in Richland County, Wisconsin. She was chairman of the county children's board for many years.

== Early life ==
Ada was born to David James and Laura Briggs James in 1876. She had two siblings—Beulah, born in 1878, and Vida, born in 1887—and a step-brother, Oscar, born in 1869 to David James and his first late wife, Ada Briggs. Ada James's older brother died as an infant in 1874.

James experienced the onset of hearing loss shortly after high school and used an ear trumpet throughout the rest of her life.

She fell in love with Charles Bingham Cornwall, a widower and the Richland County Clerk, and they were to be married in 1897. However, her father objected to the marriage and, at the threat of disowning her, she broke off the engagement. James never married and instead poured herself into a variety of causes, beginning with women's suffrage.

== Legacy ==
Ada James is remembered as Richland Center's and Richland County's most prominent suffragist and for her work with disadvantaged children and women. She came to the suffrage movement naturally because her mother, Laura, in 1882 was one of the founders of the Richland Center Woman's Club that worked tirelessly for women's suffrage. Indeed, the Woman's Club may have been the first suffrage organization formed in the state.

Two years later, the Woman's Club hosted the first regular convention of the Wisconsin Suffrage Association. In 1886, Susan B. Anthony spoke for suffrage in Bailey's Opera House in Richland Center.

In 1892, she and several other high-school girls formed the Equality Club to assist in the campaign for women's suffrage. In 1911, she was a founding member of the statewide Political Equality League and served as its president for two years, including the crucial state referendum fight of 1912. James used unprecedented tactics, hiring a motorboat to distribute leaflets along the Wolf River and employing an airplane to drop brochures on county fair crowds in the campaign. However, women's suffrage went down in a resounding defeat, by 90,000 votes; a trouncing James blamed primarily on the lavish spending by the brewing interests that feared women voters would support temperance.

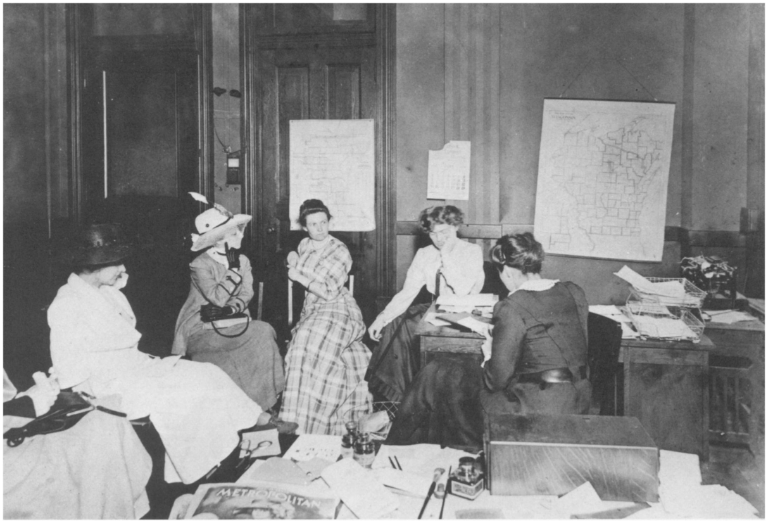
Ada James (in plaid) during a campaign strategy session, 1912

In 1912, after the ill-fated campaign, the Political Equality League and the Wisconsin Suffrage Association merged under the latter's name and James became a vice president. Although the WSA continued its work, World War I, which the United States entered in April 1917, created the conditions that compelled President Woodrow Wilson to support women's suffrage. In 1919, Wisconsin became the first state to ratify the Nineteenth Amendment to the United States Constitution. Wisconsin won this distinction because James's father, former State Senator David G. James, traveled to Washington, D.C., via train and hand delivered the documents to just nose out Illinois for this honor. Women voted nationwide for the first time in the presidential election of 1920.

With the suffrage battle finally won, Ada James devoted the remainder of her life to numerous other causes: temperance, pacifism, world peace, and assistance for underprivileged children. She became keenly interested in the latter cause when she began bringing poor children from Chicago to Richland County in the summers. These "sunshine children" caused her to realize that Richland County had its own underprivileged children. During 1920, James led a campaign that convinced the Richland County Board to create a Children's Board, the first such organization in the state. She poured her energy and money into this cause. Richland County's shelter for abused women and their children is named Ada James Place / Passages, Inc.

== See also ==
- List of Wisconsin suffragists
