= Mary E. Haggart =

American suffragist

- Born: Mary E. Rothwell; 1843; Washington County, Pennsylvania
- Died: 1904 (aged 60–61)
- Education: Southwestern Normal College
- Known for: Women's Suffrage Movement
- Spouse: David Haggart (married 1867-1904)
- Parent(s): Samuel S. Rothwell and Elizabeth Rothwell

Mary E. Haggart (1843–1904) was an American suffragist, who was active in the women's suffrage movement in Indiana beginning in the late 1860s. Haggart was regarded for her strength of character, persistence, and activism for women's rights. She came to this status through her career as a lecturer, and her publication of the Women's Tribune. Throughout her lifetime, she consistently worked within the women's suffrage and temperance movements.

== Early life and education ==
Mary E. Rothwell was born in 1843 in Washington County, Pennsylvania to Samuel S. Rothwell and Elizabeth Rothwell. Her father, Samuel S. Rothwell was a Methodist Episcopal minister and was one of the original leading abolitionists in western Pennsylvania. Her mother, Elizabeth Rothwell was a woman of character and devoted her life to her family. Mary inherited traits from both her mother and father, and in her early childhood practiced lecturing and writing essays.

At the age of 15, Mary Rothwell was asked by abolitionists to deliver an address regarding slavery in her county. She accepted the invitation and was immersed quickly into anti-slavery meetings throughout western Pennsylvania. She was later asked to come before the public and speak as a reformer to larger audiences. Her father held stringent views concerning the transparency of women in the public sphere, and declined her transition and involvement of a public career.

She received her primary education in the California Seminary in Washington County and then furthered her education at the Southwestern Normal College of Pennsylvania. She later reconnected with the college, and began her early career there as a teacher.

== Marriage ==
Married to David Haggart in February 1867. David Haggart was born in Pennsylvania in 1829. Soon after their marriage, they relocated to the town of Danville, Indiana in 1868. David Haggart was a homeopathic physician who began his practice in Danville. He was a considered to be a gentleman of liberal views and worked towards the advancement of women. Mary Haggart began a life of housekeeping and domestic duties. David and Mary then relocated to Indianapolis, IN. There is no record of the Haggart's having children.

== Suffrage ==
Mary Haggart was active in the Indiana's suffrage movement beginning in 1869. After starting her married life in Danville, she and her husband relocated to the Indianapolis area. The professors of Danville Academy took interest in her lecturing ability, and invited her to deliver an address that she titled "Women's True Culture." Her address was described as, "a talk on the education of women without any whining about women's rights or satire about the stronger sex." After this lecture, she was asked to repeat it and therefore delivered it formally at a woman's suffrage convention in Indianapolis. After her initial lecture at the woman's suffrage convention in Indianapolis the press began to follow along her journey. She gained a respectable reputation following her numerous engagements throughout Indiana along with other states. Haggart was sent to St. Louis, Missouri in 1877 as a delegate to the National Woman's Suffrage Association.

Starting in 1877, Haggart held the position of chairman for the Woman Suffrage Central Committee in Indiana. She was also one of the originators of the idea of having a women's department in the Indiana State Fair and was later elected president of the Woman's State Fair Association. In 1878 and 1879 in Indianapolis, Haggart, along with Florence Anderson, published and edited a weekly Women's Tribune; a paper dedicated to the interests of women. The newspaper became a crucial part of the state's Suffrage Association. Additionally, she edited the Woman's Domain in Chicago and occasionally contributed to the Woman's Journal. In 1880, Haggart went on to hold office in both the National and American suffrage associations. She addressed the General Assembly of Indiana and of other states on the behalf of the legal and political equality of women.

Her work expanded to the eighteenth annual meeting of the American Woman Suffrage Association which was held in the House of Representatives at the Capital in Topeka, Kansas. "The Women's State Suffrage Association and the Equal Suffrage Society of Indianapolis composed of Zerelda G. Wallace, Mary F. Thomas, Mary Haggart and Amy E. Dunn who spoke on behalf of a suffrage amendment." This opportunity to speak in front of a larger assembly provided a chance for the women to progress the status of women's suffrage, if the suffrage amendment would pass.

Mary Haggart is known for her dedication to the suffrage movement, her broader work for women's equality in the public sphere, and her belief in the inherent rights of all United States citizens.

== Other ==
Among her work with suffrage, Mary Haggart worked in the temperance drive and was appointed a member of the State Board of Agriculture. Haggart moved back to Pennsylvania in her late life and resided there until her death in 1904.
