= William Clarke Whitford =

American politician

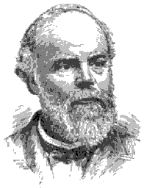

11th Superintendent of Public Instruction of Wisconsin
- In office January 7, 1878 – January 2, 1882

Member of the Wisconsin State Assembly
- In office 1868

Personal details
- Born: May 5, 1828 Edmeston, New York, U.S.
- Died: May 20, 1902 (aged 74) Milton, Wisconsin, U.S.
- Party: Republican
- Education: Union College; Union Theological Seminary
- Occupation: Educator, clergyman, politician

William Clarke Whitford (May 5, 1828 – May 20, 1902) was an American educator, legislator, and pastor of the Seventh Day Baptist Church from Wisconsin.

== Biography ==
Born in Edmeston, New York, Whitford received his degrees from Union College and Union Theological Seminary. He moved to what is now Milton, Wisconsin, where he served as President of Milton College and as pastor of the Seventh Day Baptist Church in Milton. He served in the Wisconsin State Assembly in 1868, sponsoring a bill for woman's suffrage; and was the Superintendent of Public Instruction of Wisconsin 1878–1882. He served on the Wisconsin Board of Regents for Wisconsin normal schools. Whitford also wrote various article about education.

He died in Milton, Wisconsin on May 20, 1902.
