= John Bascom =

American professor, college president and writer

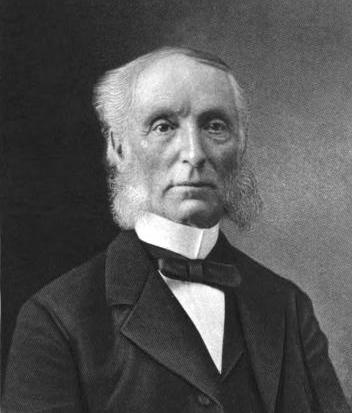
- Born: May 1, 1827; Genoa, New York, U.S.A.
- Died: October 27, 1911 (aged 84); Williamstown, Massachusetts, U.S.
- Occupations: President, University of Wisconsin, 1874 to 1887

John Bascom (May 1, 1827 – October 2, 1911) was an American professor, college president and writer.

== Life ==
He was born on May 1, 1827, in Genoa, New York, and was a graduate of Williams College with the class of 1849. He graduated from the Andover Theological Seminary in 1855. Aside from the degrees he received in those places, he held many other scholarly and honorary degrees. He was professor of rhetoric at Williams College from 1855 to 1874, and was president of the University of Wisconsin from 1874 to 1887. He retired in 1903 and died in Williamstown, Massachusetts, on October 2, 1911.

Authoring between 30 and 40 books over his lifetime, Bascom later claimed that their writing cost him more than they earned in sales revenue. However, his biography expressed pride at their impact on others.

He influenced future Progressive Governor of Wisconsin and U.S. Senator Robert M. La Follette Sr. during the latter's studies in his youth at the University of Wisconsin.

In 1853, Bascom married Abbie Burt, who died shortly thereafter. He then wed Emma Curtiss, to whom he was married for over fifty years. Their three children, Jean, George and Florence, all graduated from the University of Wisconsin.

== Legacy and honors ==
Bascom Hill and Bascom Hall on the campus of the University of Wisconsin-Madison are both named in his honor. Bascom House at Williams College is also named after Bascom. During World War II, the Liberty ship SS John Bascom was built in Panama City, Florida, and named in his honor.

== See also ==
- List of French Americans, famous people of French descent

== Relatives of note ==
- Earl W. Bascom, cowboy artist/sculptor, rodeo pioneer, "Father of Modern Rodeo"
- Florence Bascom, America's first female geologist
- George Nicholas Bascom, army officer of Apache Wars
- Henry Bidleman Bascom, Congressional Chaplain 1824–26
- John U. Bascom, American surgeon
- Willard Bascom, oceanographer
- Bryant Butler Brooks, cowboy, rancher and Governor of Wyoming 1905–1911
- Frederic S. Remington, western artist and sculptor, "Father of Cowboy Sculpture"
- Jedediah S. Smith, American explorer, mountain man
- Franchot Tone, American actor
- Wolfe Tone, "Father of Irish Republicanism"
- S. Dilworth Young, American religious leader

== Books and articles ==
Many of these are in the public domain and fully viewable at Google Books.

- An Appeal To Young Men On The Use Of Tobacco (1850)
- Philosophy Of Rhetoric (1866)
- The Principles Of Psychology (1869)
- Aesthetics (1871)
- Science, Philosophy And Religion (1871); (1872)
- Philosophy Of English Literature (1874)
- Education And The State (1877)
- Comparative Psychology (1878)
- Ethics (1879)
- Natural Theology (1880)
- The Science Of Mind (1881)
- The Lawyer And The Lawyer's Questions (1882)
- Problems In Philosophy (1885)
- Prohibition And Common Sense (1885)
- Sociology (1887)
- The New Theology (1891)
- Address Before The YMCA Of The Mass. Agricultural College (1892)
- An Historical Interpretation Of Philosophy (1893)
- Social Theory (1895)
- Evolution And Religion (1897)
- The Goodness Of God (1901)
- The Remedies Of Trusts (1901)
- The College Tax Exemption (1907)
- Things Learned By Living (1913)
- Sermons And Addresses (1913)

Academic offices
Preceded by John H. Twombly	President of the University of Wisconsin; 1874-1887	Succeeded by Thomas Chamberlin
