= Theodora W. Youmans =

American journalist, editor & women's suffrage activist

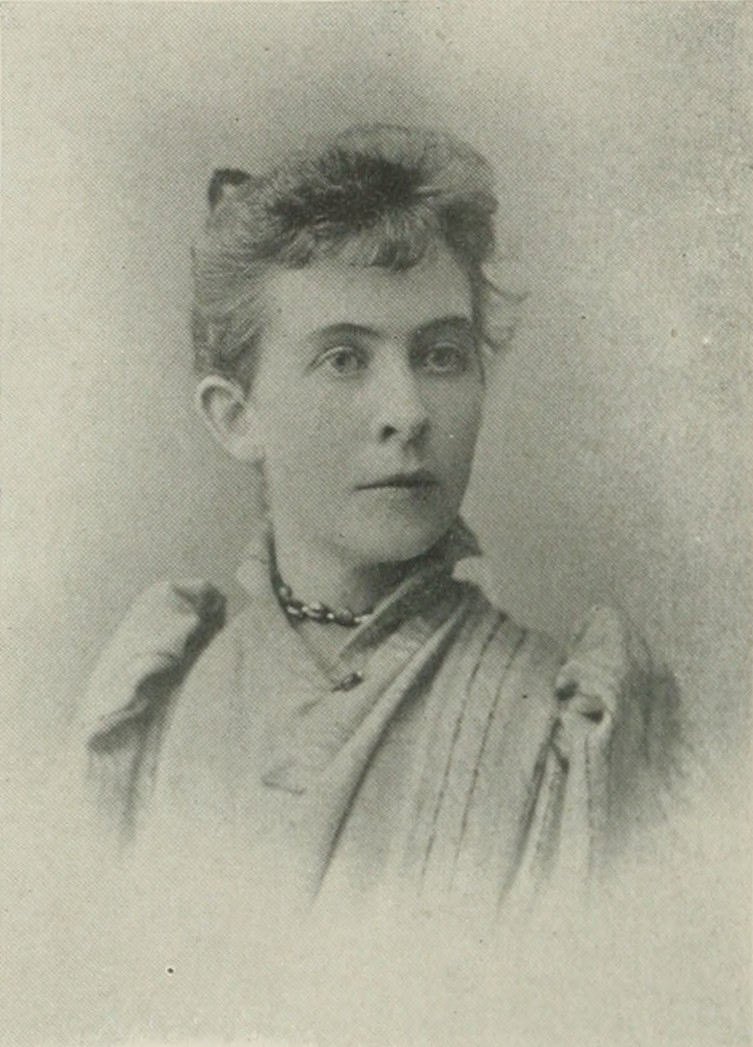
- Born: Theodora Winton; February 1, 1863; Ashippun, Wisconsin, U.S.
- Died: August 17, 1932 (aged 69); Waukesha, Wisconsin
- Known for: suffragist women's rights advocate

Theodora W. Youmans (February 1, 1863 – August 17, 1932) was an American journalist, editor, and women's suffrage activist from Wisconsin. As president of the Wisconsin Women's Suffrage Association, Youmans played an important role in securing Wisconsin women the right to vote.

== Early life ==
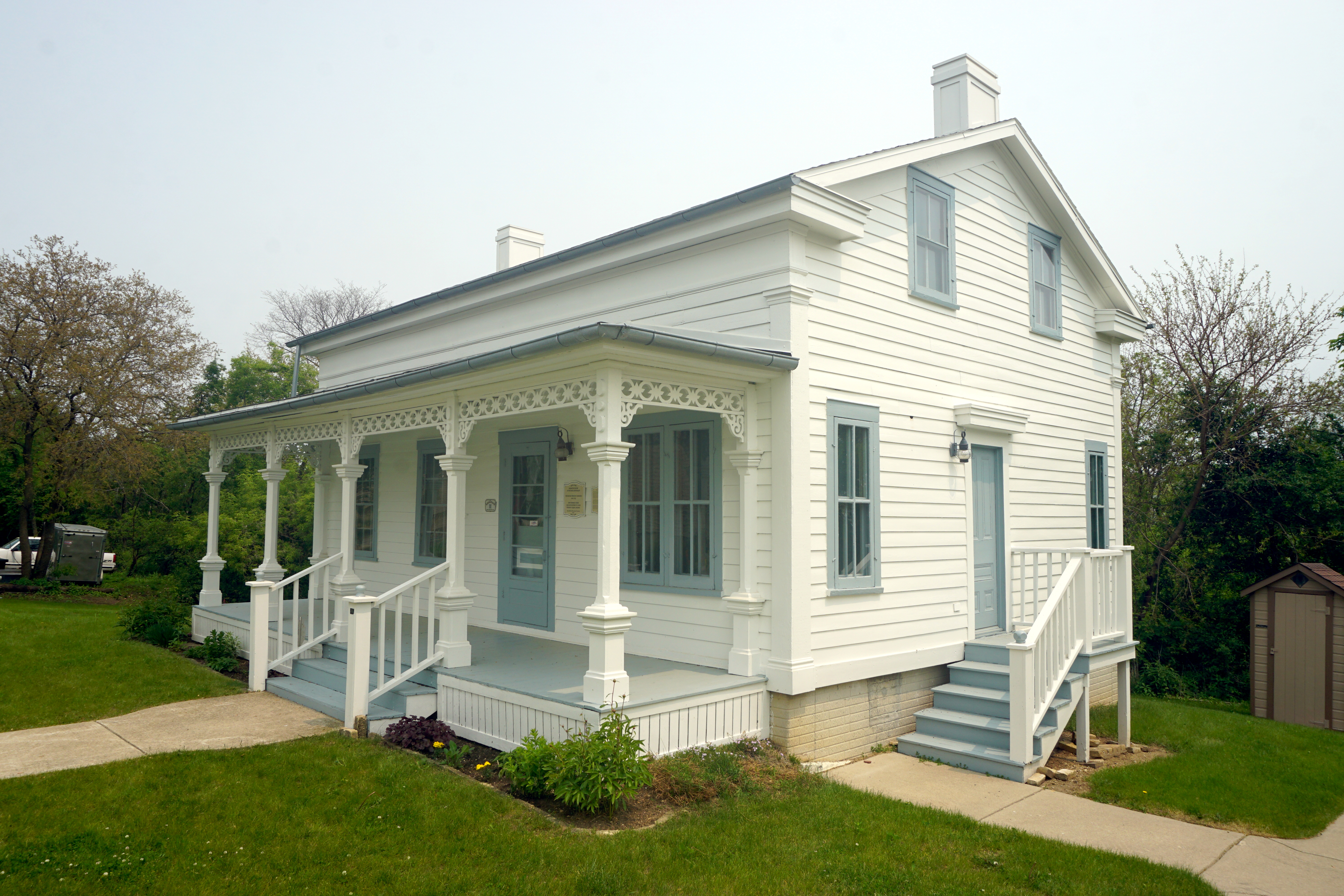
Girlhood Home of Theodora W. Youmans at the New Berlin Historical Society in New Berlin, Wisconsin

Theodora W. Youmans was born Theodora Winton in Ashippun, Wisconsin and grew up in Prospect Hill. Her father, Theodore Sumner Winton, was a storekeeper and postmaster. Her mother, Emily Winton, was a former schoolteacher. She attended Carroll Academy in Waukesha County.

== Career ==
Youmans started her career in the 1880s as a freelance writer, and later a staff writer, for the Waukesha Freeman. As a woman journalist, she was a pioneer in her field. In 1886 she wrote a series of articles about her experiences traveling alone in the Northwoods. Soon afterwards she began writing a regular "Women's World" column for the Freeman. She married the newspaper's editor and publisher, Henry Mott Youmans, in 1889, and was promoted to assistant editor in 1890.

As a journalist and a leader of local women's clubs, Youmans quickly rose to prominence and became a member of various boards and committees. She founded the Wisconsin Anti-Tuberculosis Association in 1908. In 1911, she began handling the press for the Political Equality League and lobbied for the 1912 suffrage referendum. She also continued her work as assistant editor and "suffrage writer" at the Waukesha Freeman. Despite her efforts, the 1912 referendum failed.

The Political Equality League merged with the Wisconsin Woman Suffrage Association, and in 1913, Youmans became president of the association. She traveled to New York City where she met suffrage leader Carrie Chapman Catt, who was also from Wisconsin. Catt convinced her that their best option was to try to force a federal amendment. Catt's hunch proved correct when another Wisconsin referendum on women's suffrage failed in 1917.

Although Youmans was a pacifist, she agreed to Catt's plan to win President Wilson's support for women's suffrage by supporting the war effort. The plan proved successful. With Wilson's support, the Nineteenth Amendment passed Congress in 1919. Wisconsin was the first state to ratify it.

Following Catt’s lead at the national level, Youmans renamed the state suffrage organization as the Wisconsin the first president of the Wisconsin chapter of the League of Women Voters in 1920 and served as the state League’s first vice president. Two years later, she ran for state senate as a Republican and lost. She died at her home in Waukesha, Wisconsin in 1932.

The Theodora Youmans Citizenship Award has been given each year by the Wisconsin chapter of the General Federation of Women's Clubs (GFWC-WI) since 1937. Youmans Park in Waukesha is named in her honor.
