= Emma Curtiss Bascom =

American educator, suffragist, reformer

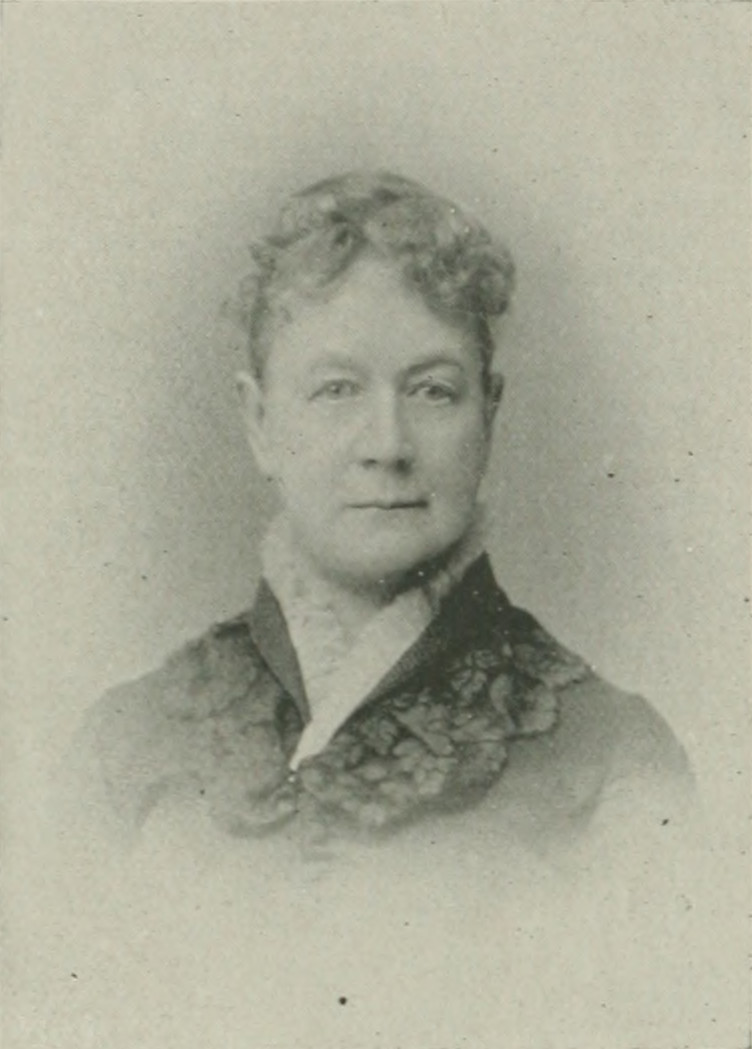
- Portrait from "A Woman of the Century"
- Born: Emma Curtiss; April 20, 1828; Sheffield, Massachusetts, U.S.
- Died: 1916 (aged 87–88)
- Occupations: Educator; Suffragist
- Spouse: John Bascom (m. 1856)

Emma Curtiss Bascom (née Emma Curtiss; April 20, 1828 – 1916) was a 19th-century American educator, suffragist and reformer from Massachusetts. She was a charter member of the Association for the Advancement of Woman and for many years was an officer of its board.

== Biography ==
Emma Curtiss was born in Sheffield, Massachusetts, April 20, 1828. She was the second daughter of Owen Curtiss, and through her mother, Caroline Standish Owen, a direct descendant of Myles Standish. Her early education occurred at the Great Barrington Academy, Great Barrington, Massachusetts, at Pittsfield Institute, Massachusetts, and at Patapsco Female Institute, Maryland.

She became a teacher first in Kinderhook Academy, and later in Stratford Academy, Connecticut. She was a charter member of the Association for the Advancement of Woman and for many years was an officer of its board. She was secretary of the Great Lakes Exposition's Woman's Centennial Commission for the State of Wisconsin. She was active in the Woman's Christian Temperance Union almost from its first organization.

In 1856, she was married to John Bascom, at that time professor in Williams College. For years, her husband was unable to see, and she had to assist him with his studies and render him daily assistance in reading and writing. She was the mother of five children, including George (b. 1857), Jean (b. 1859), Emma (b. 1861), Florence (1862–1945), and Mabel (b. 1867). She died in 1916.
