= Belle Case La Follette =

American activist (1859–1931)

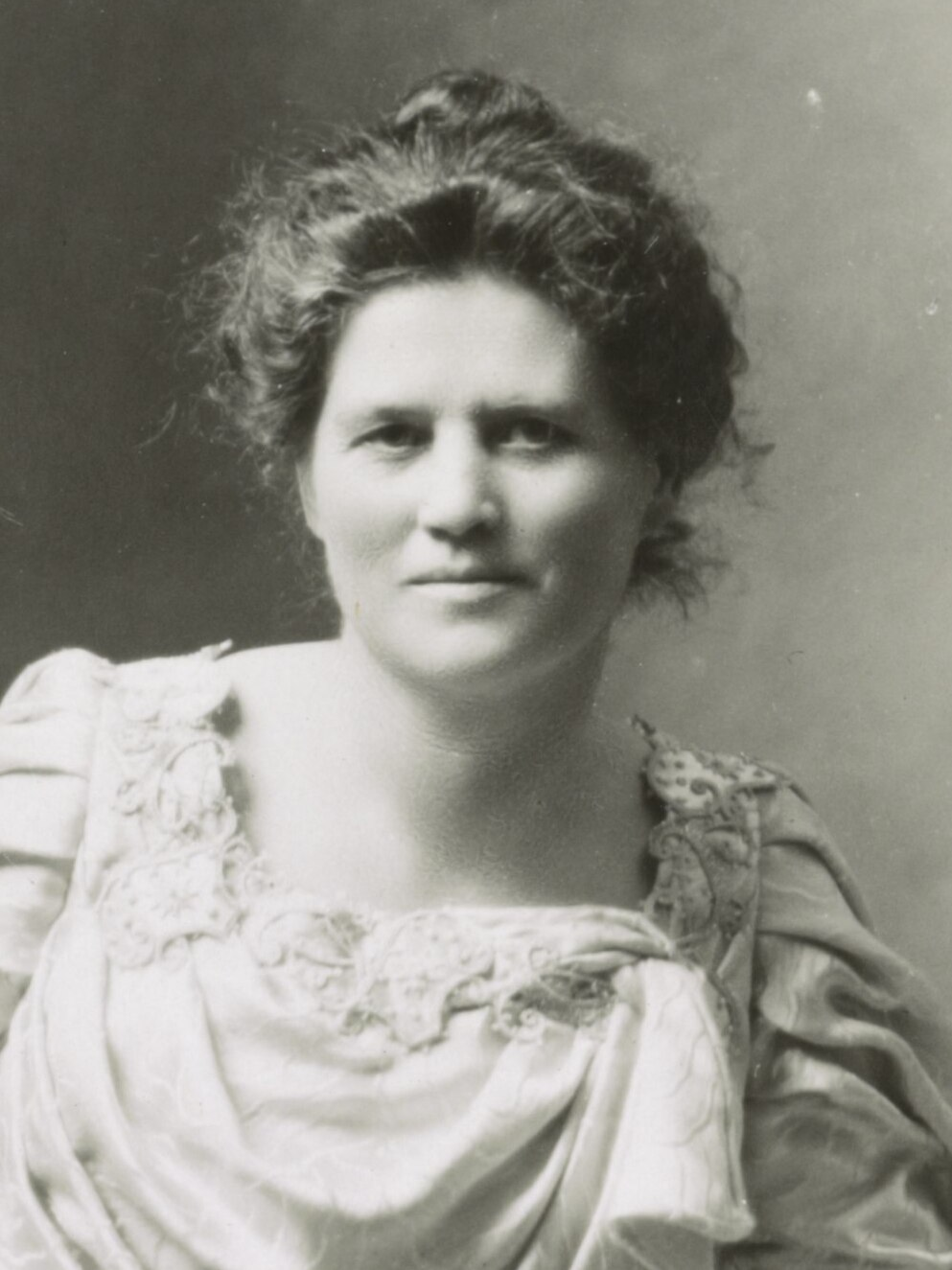
- La Follette in 1905

First Lady of Wisconsin
- In role January 7, 1901 – January 1, 1906
- Governor: Robert M. La Follette
- Preceded by: Agnes Potter
- Succeeded by: Helen Bliss

Personal details
- Born: Isabelle Case; April 21, 1859 Summit, Wisconsin, U.S.
- Died: August 18, 1931 (aged 72) Washington D.C., U.S.
- Resting place: Forest Hill Cemetery; Madison, Wisconsin
- Spouse: Robert M. La Follette Sr. (m. 1881–1925)
- Children: Fola La Follette; Robert M. La Follette Jr. Philip La Follette; Mary La Follette
- Education: University of Wisconsin-Madison; University of Wisconsin Law School
- Occupation: Lawyer and women's suffrage activist

Isabelle Case La Follette (April 21, 1859 – August 18, 1931) was a women's suffrage, peace, and civil rights activist in Wisconsin, United States. She worked with the Woman's Peace Party during World War I. At the time of her death in 1931, The New York Times called her "probably the least known yet most influential of all American women who have had to do with public affairs in this country." She was the wife and helpmate of Robert "Fighting Bob" La Follette—a prominent Progressive Republican politician both in Wisconsin and on the national scene—and as co-editor with her husband of La Follette's Weekly Magazine.

== Biography ==
Isabelle Case was born on April 21, 1859, in Summit, Juneau County, Wisconsin, and grew up on her family's farm in Baraboo. Her parents were Unitarians of English and Scottish descent. She attended the University of Wisconsin–Madison from 1875 to 1879 and, upon graduation, taught high school in Spring Green and junior high school in Baraboo. One of her students in Baraboo was John Ringling, of whom she later wrote "... when John read a long account -- interrupted with giggles from the school -- of the side shows he and other boys had been giving every night, I lectured him and drew the moral that if John would put his mind on his lessons as he did on side shows, he might yet become a scholar. Fortunately the scolding had no effect."

=== Education ===
In 1875, Belle Case left home for the University of Wisconsin-Madison, with the financial support of her farming parents. She excelled as a student, never missing a class or arriving late while at the university.

Even early in life, Belle did not shy away from protesting what she perceived as injustices, particularly those targeted at women. In regard to one of her speeches, local paper Madison Democrat wrote, "... she portrayed the vanity of many of us in trying to make an empty display and neglecting it for true stability and depth of sentiment." In another speech, "Children's Playthings," Belle conflated the convention of young girls playing with dolls with future expectations for womanhood, claiming these domestic "dreams" of girlhood would only lead to "impossible future happiness" and "dissatisfied, nervous, complaining [women]."

Her senior oration is perhaps her most memorable. "Learning to See" highlighted natural curiosity and the danger of forcing children to conform to convention. It won her the Lewis Prize for best essay or oration produced by the graduating class.

Belle Case La Follette later returned to the University of Wisconsin and in 1885 became the University of Wisconsin Law School's first female graduate.

=== Marriage ===
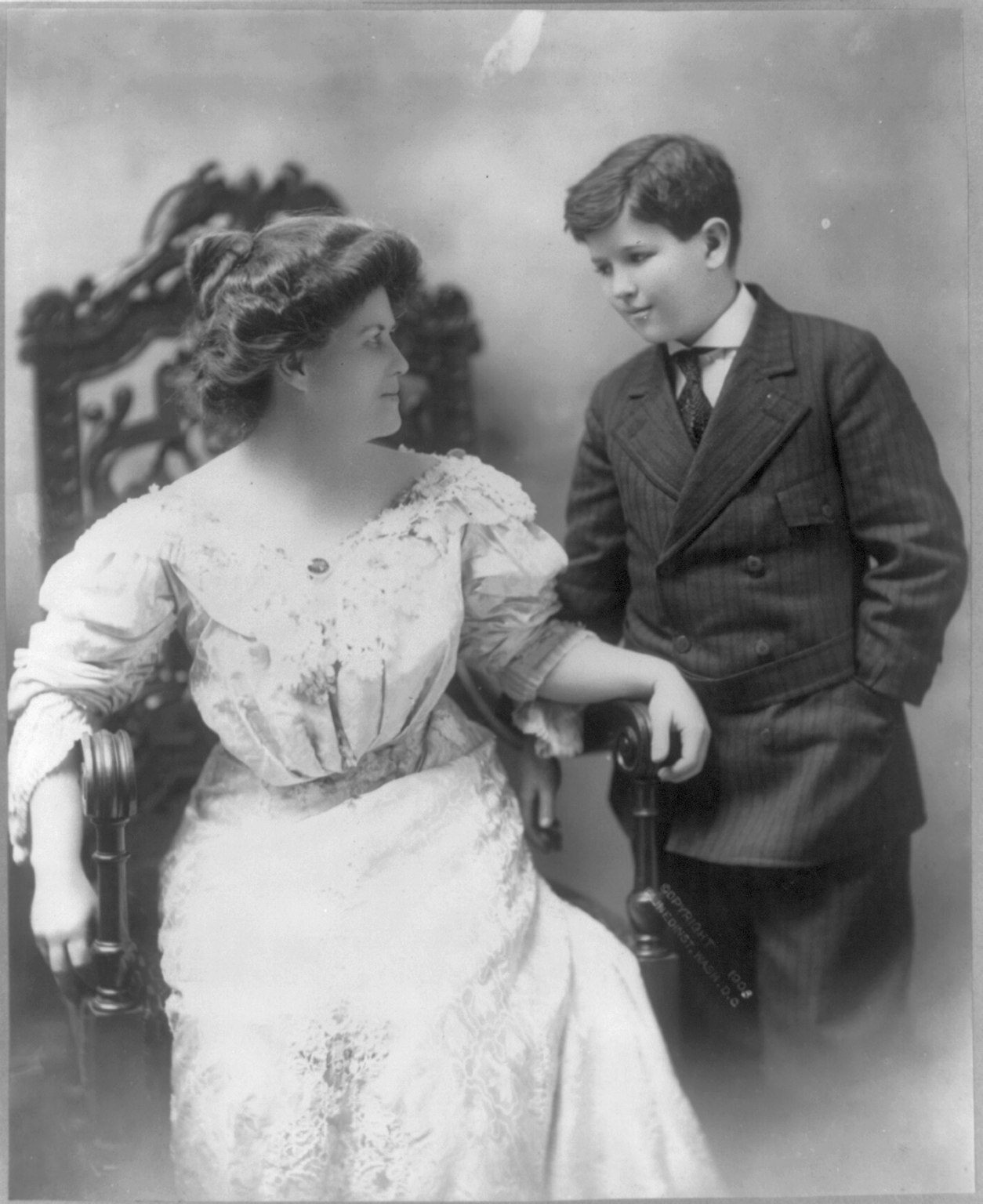
Belle Case La Follette with her elder son, Robert Jr., in 1908

Belle Case and Robert "Bob" La Follette developed an early friendship at University of Wisconsin, their love of reform and rural backgrounds providing common ground for a potential courtship. Belle, however, only wished their bond to remain "free from sentiment," at least until they had left college.

While Belle excelled in her studies, Bob became notorious for poor grades but a clear, charismatic intelligence. While Bob helped Belle in her own speech-giving, Belle assisted Bob in his school work and other written projects (Bob would later only barely graduate, John Bascom himself having to provide the final say-so.) Their companionship eventually did blossom into an engagement. Bob would later say that, "Mamma laughed when I proposed to her."

Case and La Follette were married on December 31, 1881, in a ceremony performed by a Unitarian minister. By mutual agreement, the word "obey" was omitted from their marriage vows. While Bob respected Belle's independence, intelligence, and beliefs, he still hoped for a domestic life, writing in his journal, "Oh hasten [the] time when I can see her the center of a home." Belle remained an activist throughout her life, but did note that "the supreme experience in life is motherhood," and enjoyed taking care of their children.

Belle and Robert La Follette were the parents of four children (two daughters and two sons). Their first child, Flora Dodge La Follette, always called "Fola," was born on September 10, 1882. Fola married the playwright George Middleton on October 29, 1911. Robert Jr., born in 1895, represented Wisconsin in the U.S. Senate from 1925 to 1947; Philip, born in 1897, served three terms as governor of Wisconsin; and Mary, born in 1899. Robert Jr. and Philip began the Wisconsin Progressive Party, which briefly held a dominant role in Wisconsin politics.

== Early career ==
Belle's first job upon graduating was as an assistant principal at Spring Green High School. During this time she didn't spend much time with her then fiancé, Bob, often to his chagrin. But Bob was equally busy serving as the new Dane County district attorney; so much so that he had to "remind" himself to attend their marriage ceremony.

After the birth of their first child, Belle enjoyed motherhood but was also determined to retain a professional life. In 1885 she became the first woman to graduate from University of Wisconsin Law School.

She never practiced law formally, but would assist her husband Bob in numerous cases and later political queries. Belle's role was anything but passive, even behind the scenes. In the 1890s, she penned a brief that broke new legal ground and won a case before the state's Supreme Court. Bob would later remark in his autobiography that she was his "wisest and best counselor",

This is not partial judgement, the Progressive leaders of Wisconsin who welcomed her to our conferences would bear witness. Her grasp of the great problems, sociological and economic, is surpassed by any of the strong men who have been associated with me in my work.

== Activism ==
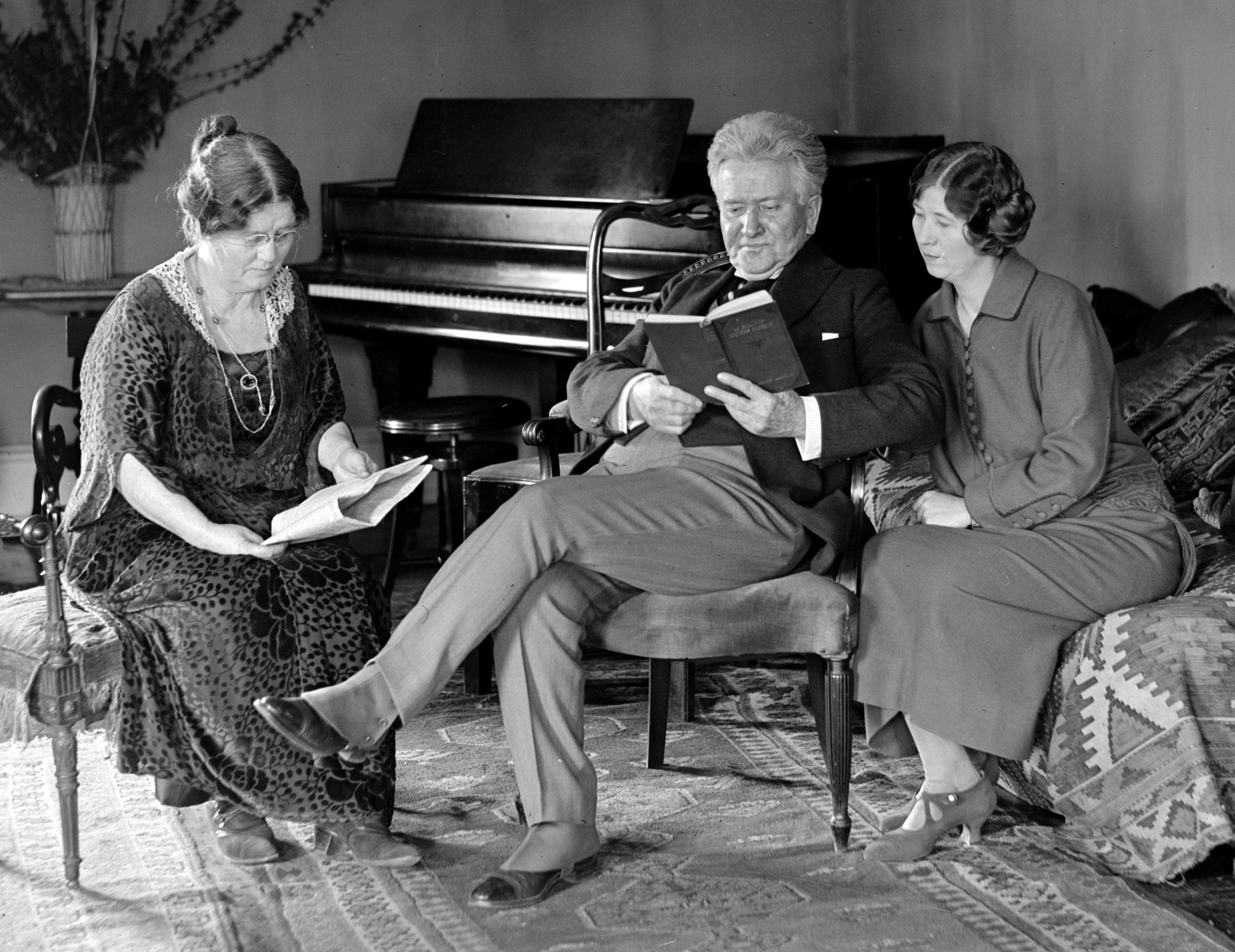
Belle Case La Follette (left) reading with her family in February 1924

La Follette was active in the women's suffrage movement at the state and national levels. Beginning in 1909, to express her views on women's suffrage and other topics of the day, she wrote and edited a weekly "Home and Education" column for La Follette's Weekly Magazine, a magazine started by her husband and later became The Progressive. In 1911 and 1912 she wrote a syndicated column for the North American Press Syndicate.

La Follette's interest in women's suffrage led to her membership in the National American Woman Suffrage Association in 1910, and joined its national board in 1911. However, when a referendum on women's suffrage in Wisconsin was to be decided in a general election in November 1912, she resigned from the NAWSA to devote her efforts to secure its passage. Suffragists made appearances at more than 70 county fairs in 1912, including La Follette, who visited seven of them in ten days. Despite their efforts, the referendum was defeated by a vote of 227,024 to 135,546.

When subsequent referendums to gain voting rights for women in Wisconsin were defeated in 1913 and 1915, La Follette, like other suffragists at that time, decided to devote her efforts to a national campaign for a women's suffrage amendment to the U.S. Constitution. On April 26, 1913, La Follette was among the members of the public who spoke before the U.S. Senate Committee on Women's Suffrage, delivering what the National Magazine described as "a remarkable and forcible address" at the gathering. She was among the 94 suffragists who met with President Woodrow Wilson in the White House during the early days of his administration. Determined to gather public support for the constitutional amendment on women's suffrage, La Follette joined the lecture circuit to address audiences in the Midwest. In addition, she gave numerous speeches in her home state in 1919 to assure that Wisconsin voters would support ratification of the Nineteenth Amendment.

La Follette also opposed the ongoing oppression of African Americans. In 1914 she addressed the colored Young Men's Christian Association, raising an argument that segregation of colored people on street cars, public conveyances, and government departments was wrong. La Follette added that there would be no constitution of peace until the question is "settled right".

In 1915 La Follette helped found the Woman's Peace Party, which later became the Women's International League for Peace and Freedom. After World War I, she was active in the Women's Committee for World Disarmament, and helped found the National Council for the Prevention of War in 1921. La Follette and other women influenced governments to convene the Naval Arms Limitation Conference in 1922.

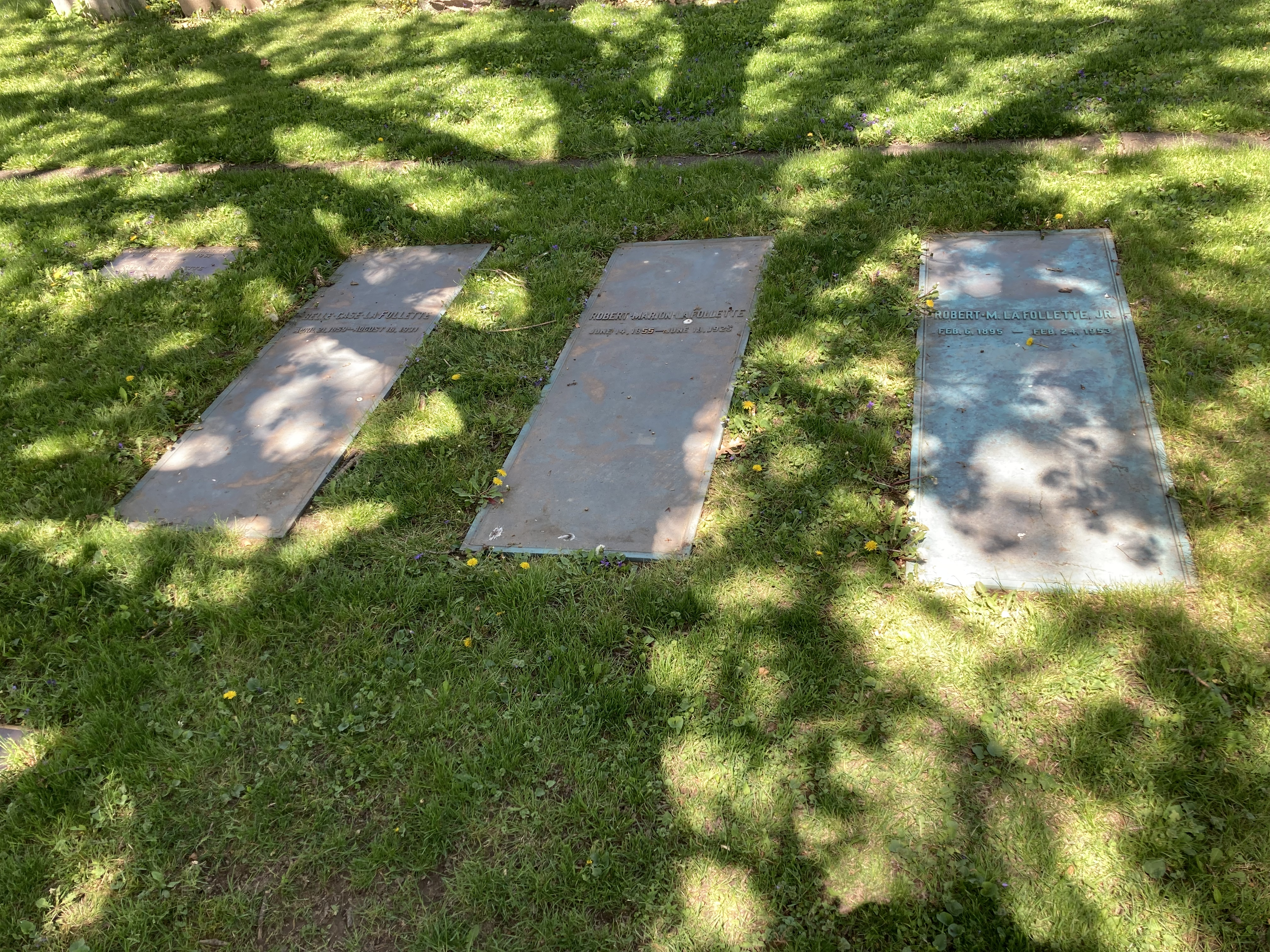
La Follette's grave (third from right) at Forest Hill Cemetery

After her husband's death on June 18, 1925, his seat in the U.S. Senate was offered to her, but she turned down the opportunity to become the first woman Senator, perhaps because it would have upset the very balance between her public and private lives that she is esteemed for.

== Death ==
She died on August 18, 1931, aged 72, in Washington D.C., as the result of a punctured intestine and peritonitis following a routine medical exam. She was buried in Forest Hill Cemetery in Madison.

== Published works ==
- Belle Case La Follette and Fola La Follette (1953). Robert M. La Follette, June 14, 1855-June 18, 1925, 2 volumes. MacMillan. ISBN 978-1-299-79732-1.
