= Harriet Grim =

American suffragist and professor

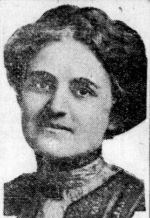
- Grim in 1912
- Born: Harriet Elizabeth Grim; February 25, 1884; Fulton, Illinois
- Died: September 7, 1967 (aged 83); Oconomowoc, Wisconsin
- Occupation: Professor

Harriet Elizabeth Grim (February 25, 1881 – September 7, 1967) was an American suffragist and professor of speech. She was known for being a skilled orator. She traveled through the Midwest urging states to adopt their own equal suffrage amendments.

== Early life and education ==
Grim was born in Fulton, Illinois, the daughter of Ephraim Wages Grim and Elizabeth Jones. She attended high school in Canton, Illinois. She entered college in 1904 at the University of Chicago, where she was an honor student in sociology and speech. Around 1907, she traveled to Europe to study the women's suffrage movement.

She earned as master's degree from the University of Wisconsin, followed by a doctorate in 1938.

== Career ==
=== Suffragist ===
By her early twenties, Grim had already gained national attention for her work advocating for equal suffrage. She pushed the Republican Party to include an equal suffrage plank in its platform. An Iowa newspaper at the time credited Grim's oratory skills along with her youth and beauty for bringing support to the plank.

She "stumped Illinois using her speaking skills to win public opinion." When the Illinois state senate passed its equal suffrage bill in 1911, Grim was the only woman present. Grim worked for Wisconsin to pass a state suffrage amendment in 1912. She spent a year leading up to the vote traveling the state giving public speeches. In 1914, she traveled to North Dakota to give speeches and urge the passage of a state suffrage amendment there.

=== Teaching career ===
In 1913, Grim became an English teacher in Darlington High School in Darlington, Wisconsin, and also purchased a car dealership in Mineral Point, Wisconsin "on the theory that a teacher should know business." She later became the school principal.

After earning her doctorate in 1938, she became a professor at the University of Wisconsin. She was appointed head of the university's speech department when Prof. Gertrude Johnson retired in 1944. Grim herself retired in 1952.

In 1927, she was appointed to the Wisconsin State Board of Control.

== Personal life ==
Grim never married. In 1940 and 1950, she was living with Gertrude Johnson in Madison, Wisconsin. Grim died in 1967 in a hospital in Oconomowoc, Wisconsin.
