= Laura Ross Wolcott =

American physician (1826-1915)

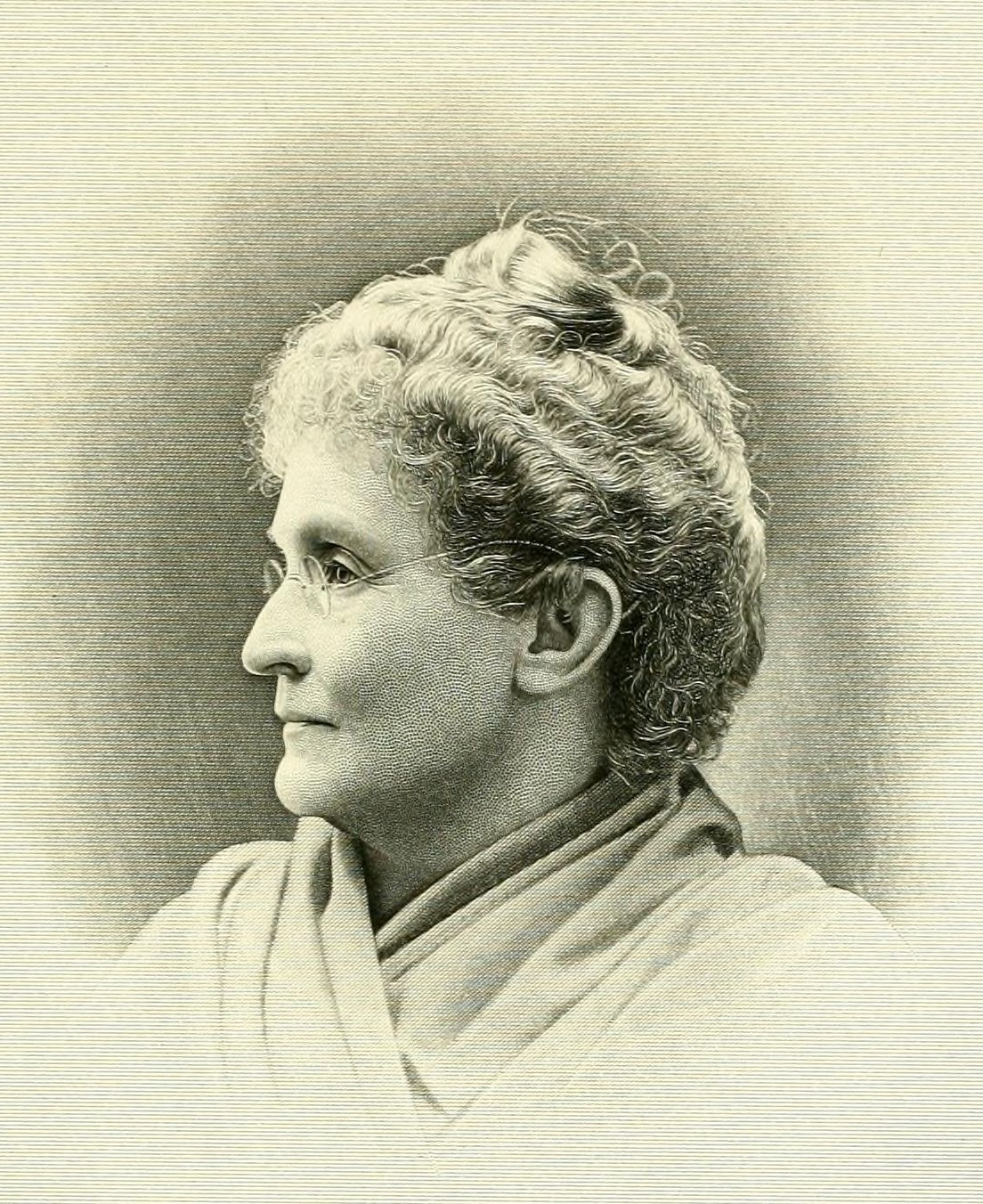
- From History of Milwaukee from its first settlement to the year 1895 (1895)
- Born: Laura J. Ross; July 16, 1826; York, Maine, U.S.
- Died: December 8, 1915 (aged 89); Ravenswood, Illinois, U.S.
- Resting place: Forest Home Cemetery, Milwaukee
- Education: Women's Medical College of Pennsylvania
- Occupation: Physician
- Spouse: Erastus B. Wolcott (m. 1869; died 1880)

Dr. Laura Ross Wolcott (born Laura J. Ross; July 16, 1826 – December 8, 1915) was the first woman to become a physician in Wisconsin and the third woman in the United States to earn a medical degree.

== Life and education ==
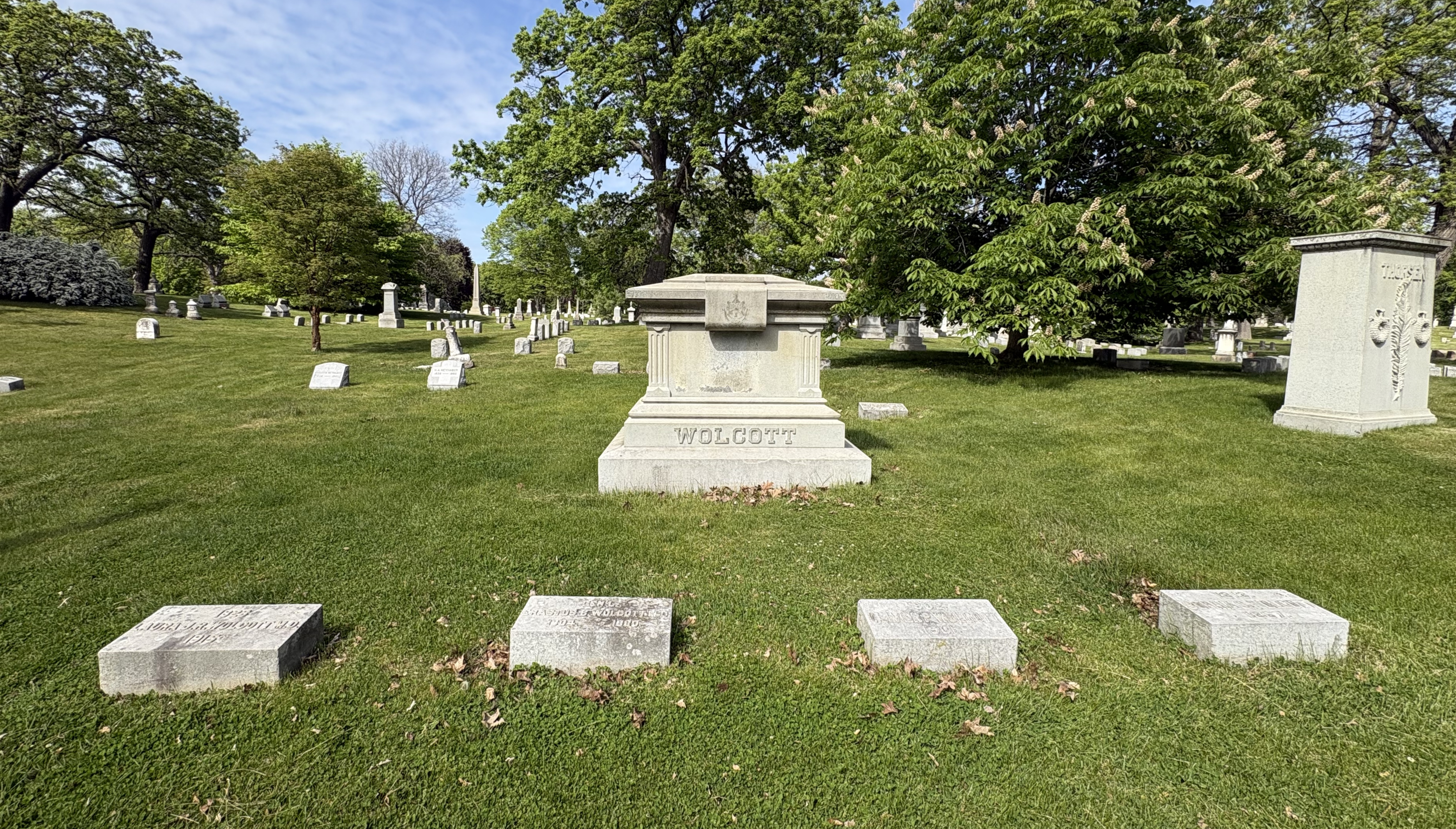
Graves of Laura and Erastus Wolcott at Forest Home Cemetery

In 1826 or 1834, Laura was born in York, Maine. She was educated at George Emerson's School in Boston and later at the Horace Mann Normal School. She may also have studied in private with faculty at Harvard University. In 1856, she graduated with a medical degree from the Women's Medical College of Pennsylvania. She married Dr. Erastus B. Wolcott in 1869. In 1894 she moved to Ravenswood, Illinois. She died in 1915 in Ravenswood, Illinois, and was buried at Forest Home Cemetery in Milwaukee.

== Career and activism ==
In 1857, Wolcott moved to Milwaukee, Wisconsin. She served as a consulting physician to hospitals, schools, and the Convent of Notre Dame. She also maintained a private practice. She was denied entry to the Medical Society of Milwaukee County because she was a woman. One male physician even published a false obituary of Laura in order for her patients to assume that she was dead, and thus find another doctor. A rival paper reported that she was still alive. Thus, she moved to Paris in 1867. She attended lectures at The University of Paris, then the Sorbonne. She also worked in a hospital. Additionally, she served as a commissioner to the World's Fair in Paris in 1867. She returned to Milwaukee, and was finally admitted to the Medical Society of Milwaukee County after a long waiting period. Her eventual admission was largely due to the work of an older doctor, Erastus Wolcott. He would eventually become her husband. Wolcott also organized meetings for women's suffrage in Milwaukee, Wisconsin and Madison, Wisconsin. She organized the first women's suffrage convention in Milwaukee in 1869. Susan B. Anthony spoke at the convention. Wolcott went on to become the first president of the Wisconsin Woman Suffrage Association and was active not only in campaigning for suffrage but also for the higher education of women. She expanded the organization from Milwaukee to branches in many other cities. She remained the organization's president for over 12 years. After her husband died in 1880, she gradually retired from practicing medicine.
