= The Waukesha Freeman =

Newspaper in Wisconsin

- Type: Daily newspaper
- Owner(s): Conley Publishing Group.
- Founder(s): Martin Cullaton
- Editor-in-chief: Bill Yorth
- News editor: Karen Pilarski
- Founded: 1859
- Website: gmtoday.com/the_freeman/

The Waukesha Freeman is a local newspaper that serves Waukesha County, Wisconsin. It was founded by Martin Cullaton in 1859 as a pro-abolitionism/anti-slavery newspaper. Since the 2010s, it has hosted conservative political commentary. It is published by the Conley Publishing Group.
