= Norman L. James =

19th century American politician

Member of the Wisconsin Senate from the 28th district
- In office January 5, 1885 – January 7, 1889
- Preceded by: William C. Meffert
- Succeeded by: Robert Joiner

Coroner of Richland County, Wisconsin
- In office January 1, 1883 – January 1, 1885
- Preceded by: Darwin O. Chandler
- Succeeded by: Augustus S. Ripley

Member of the Wisconsin State Assembly from the Richland 1st district
- In office January 4, 1875 – January 3, 1876
- Preceded by: Joseph McGrew
- Succeeded by: J. L. R. McCollum
- In office January 6, 1873 – January 5, 1874
- Preceded by: William Dixon
- Succeeded by: Joseph McGrew

Personal details
- Born: November 29, 1840 Deerfield, New Hampshire, U.S.
- Died: November 25, 1918 (aged 77)
- Resting place: Richland Center Cemetery, Richland Center, Wisconsin
- Party: Republican
- Spouse: Georgia Lane (m. 1865–1918)
- Children: Eva Lois (Neal)^{(b. 1866; died 1950)}; Harry Lane James^{(b. 1868; died 1937)}; Norman Leslie James Jr.^{(b. 1881)}; Mabel L. (Pierce)^{(b. 1882; died 1955)}
- Relatives: David G. James (brother)
- Occupation: Farmer, merchant

Military service
- Allegiance: United States
- Branch/service: United States Volunteers; Union Army
- Years of service: 1861–1862
- Rank: Private, USV
- Unit: 16th Reg. Wis. Vol. Infantry
- Battles/wars: American Civil War

Norman Leslie James (November 29, 1840 – November 25, 1918) was an American farmer, merchant, and Republican politician. He was a member of the Wisconsin State Senate (1885, 1887) and State Assembly (1873, 1875), representing Richland County. His brother David G. James also served in the Wisconsin Senate, representing the same district.

== Early life and war service ==
James was born November 29, 1840, in Deerfield, New Hampshire. He came to Wisconsin with his parents and siblings in 1855, settling in Richland Center. He received a common school education in New Hampshire and continued his education at the public school in Richland Center. At age 18, he began working at various occupations, taught common school, and hired private instructors for his own advancement.

At the outbreak of the American Civil War, he volunteered for service in the Union Army, along with his younger brother, David G. James, and several of their former school classmates. They were enrolled as privates in Company F of the 16th Wisconsin Infantry Regiment. The 16th Wisconsin Infantry mustered into federal service in January 1862 and headed for St. Louis, Missouri, in March, for service in the western theater of the war. They arrived at Pittsburg Landing, Tennessee, on March 20, 1862, and were assigned to the left wing of Grant's army. On April 6, 1862, they were involved in the first skirmishing of the Battle of Shiloh. During the battle, their brigade fell back several times. The 16th Wisconsin held up well even when nearly surrounded by the enemy, and ultimately suffered 40 dead and 188 wounded.

James was not personally wounded at Shiloh, but was seriously ill after the fighting and was sent to a hospital north of Cairo, Illinois. He was ultimately discharged due to disability in October 1862. He attempted to re-enlist several times, but was not accepted back into the service.

== Business career ==
In February 1863, he formed a partnership with his father in a hardware business under the firm name "G. H. and N. L. James". After his brother, David, returned from the war, he joined the partnership, and the firm name was soon changed to "James Brothers". They operated the business together until 1880, when Norman sold his share of the company to David. In the late 1860s, the James brothers also partnered in a mail-carrying service that evolved into a general freight and passenger service, but this gave way to interest in the railroad business in the 1870s. James became invested in the Pine River and Stevens Point Railroad Company, which was completed in 1876, after which James operated as general manager for two years. The railroad was sold to the St. Paul Railroad Company in 1880.

After selling his stake in the hardware business and the railroad, James opened a lumber yard and operated a mill for the next fourteen years. In that business, he contracted to provide bridge timber for the St. Paul Railroad Company. In the 1890s, James returned to the railroad industry, working as general manager of the Kickapoo Valley Railroad, brought it to profitability, and then again sold out to the St. Paul Railroad in 1903.

James also engaged for some years in the furniture manufacturing business. The factory fell into his possession after he had put up security for a firm that had failed.

In addition to his business interests, James was also active in agriculture. He brought the first creamery to Richland County in 1878 and implemented the first centrifugal separator in the state.

== Public offices ==
James served as a member of the town and village board, and village treasurer. He was first elected to the Assembly for Richland County's first Assembly district (the Towns of (Towns of Buena Vista, Henrietta, Ithaca, Orion, Richland, Rockbridge, Westford and Willow) in 1872 as a Republican; he did not seek re-election, and was succeeded by fellow Republican Joseph McGrew. He was elected again in 1874, with 776 votes to 659 for Democrat V. G. Harter. He was not a candidate for re-election in 1875, and was succeeded by Democrat J. L. R. McCollum.

James served as a delegate to the 1880 Republican National Convention. He was elected state senator for the 28th District (at that time consisting of Iowa and Richland Counties) in 1884 (Republican incumbent William C. Meffert was not a candidate), receiving 4,712 votes, against 4,291 for Democrat George Crawford and 573 for Prohibitionist John Lee. He served as chairman of the standing committee on railroads. He was not a candidate for re-election in 1888, and was succeeded by another Republican, Robert Joiner

== Congressional testimony ==
In 1911, he testified before the United States Senate about his involvement in the election of Isaac Stephenson to the Senate from Wisconsin. He described himself as a longtime friend and supporter of Stephenson, whom he had met when they were both delegates to the 1880 Republican National Convention, and with whom he often went fishing. He testified that the only money he had been paid from the campaign was reimbursement for expenditures he'd made in support of Stephenson's election. He testified that while he was not (as had been inquired) "a man of some means," nonetheless "... I have always taken an active part in politics. That is, I have always had some man as a candidate that I was interest in."

== Personal life ==
Norman James was the eldest of four children born to George Hopkins James and his wife Lois Eames (née Heard). Norman's younger brother, David Goodrich James, served in the Wisconsin Senate in the 1900s, also representing the 28th Senate district. Norman's niece—David's daughter—Ada James became a noted suffragist.

Norman James married Georgia Lane of Bear Valley, Wisconsin, on September 11, 1865. They had four children together. Their son Harry became a career U.S. Army officer and served in the Spanish–American War. Their son Norman Jr. took over the family lumber business in Wisconsin.

He died at his home in Richland Center on November 25, 1918.

== Electoral history ==
=== Wisconsin Assembly (1872) ===
Wisconsin Assembly, Richland 1st District Election, 1872
Party	Candidate	Votes	%	±%
General Election, November 5, 1872
Republican	Norman L. James	794	54.35%	−10.69%
Reform	O. F. Black	667	45.65%	
Plurality		127	8.69%	-21.39%
Total votes		1,461	100.0%	-16.13%
Republican hold				

=== Wisconsin Assembly (1874) ===
Wisconsin Assembly, Richland 1st District Election, 1874
Party	Candidate	Votes	%	±%
General Election, November 3, 1874
Republican	Norman L. James	794	54.35%	
Democratic	V. G. Harter	667	45.65%	
Plurality		117	8.15%	
Total votes		1,435	100.0%	+74.15%
Republican hold				

=== Wisconsin Senate (1884) ===
Wisconsin Senate, 28th District Election, 1884
Party	Candidate	Votes	%	±%
General Election, November 4, 1884
Republican	Norman L. James	4,712	49.21%	−2.82%
Democratic	George Crawford	4,291	44.81%	−3.17%
Prohibition	John Lee	573	5.98%	
Plurality		421	4.40%	+0.35%
Total votes		9,576	100.0%	+69.28%
Republican hold				

Wisconsin State Assembly
Preceded by William Dixon	Member of the Wisconsin State Assembly from the Richland 1st district January 6, 1873 – January 5, 1874	Succeeded by Joseph McGrew
Preceded by Joseph McGrew	Member of the Wisconsin State Assembly from the Richland 1st district January 4, 1875 – January 3, 1876	Succeeded by J. L. R. McCollum
Wisconsin Senate
Preceded by William C. Meffert	Member of the Wisconsin Senate from the 28th district January 5, 1885 – January 7, 1889	Succeeded by Robert Joiner
Political offices
Preceded by Darwin O. Chandler	Coroner of Richland County, Wisconsin; January 1, 1883 – January 1, 1885	Succeeded by Augustus S. Ripley
