= Wisconsin's 28th Senate district =

American legislative district in southeast Wisconsin

Wisconsin's 28th State Senate district
- 2024 map defined in 2023 Wisc. Act 94; 2022 map defined in Johnson v. Wisconsin Elections Commission; 2011 map was defined in 2011 Wisc. Act 43 composed of Assembly districts 82, 83, and 84
Senator
Julian Bradley; R–New Berlin
since January 4, 2021 (5 years, 54 days)
- Demographics: 87.41% White; 1.8% Black; 6.06% Hispanic; 2.74% Asian; 1.39% Native American; 0.1% Hawaiian/Pacific Islander
- Population (2020) • Voting age: 177,766; 139,889
- Website: Official website
- Notes: Milwaukee metro-area (southwest)

The 28th Senate district of Wisconsin is one of 33 districts in the Wisconsin Senate. Located in southeast Wisconsin, the district comprises southeast Waukesha County and northwest Racine County. It includes the cities of Muskego, New Berlin, and most of the city of Waukesha, along with the villages of Big Bend, Mukwonago, and Waterford.

== Current elected officials ==
Julian Bradley is the senator representing the 28th district. He was first elected in the 2020 general election.

Each Wisconsin State Senate district is composed of three Wisconsin State Assembly districts. The 28th Senate district comprises the 82nd, 83rd, and 84th Assembly districts. The current representatives of those districts are:

- Assembly District 82: Scott Allen (R–Waukesha)
- Assembly District 83: Dave Maxey (R–New Berlin)
- Assembly District 84: Chuck Wichgers (R–Muskego)

The district is located mostly within Wisconsin's 5th congressional district, which is represented by U.S. Representative Scott Fitzgerald. The portion of the district in Racine County is located in Wisconsin's 1st congressional district, represented by Bryan Steil.

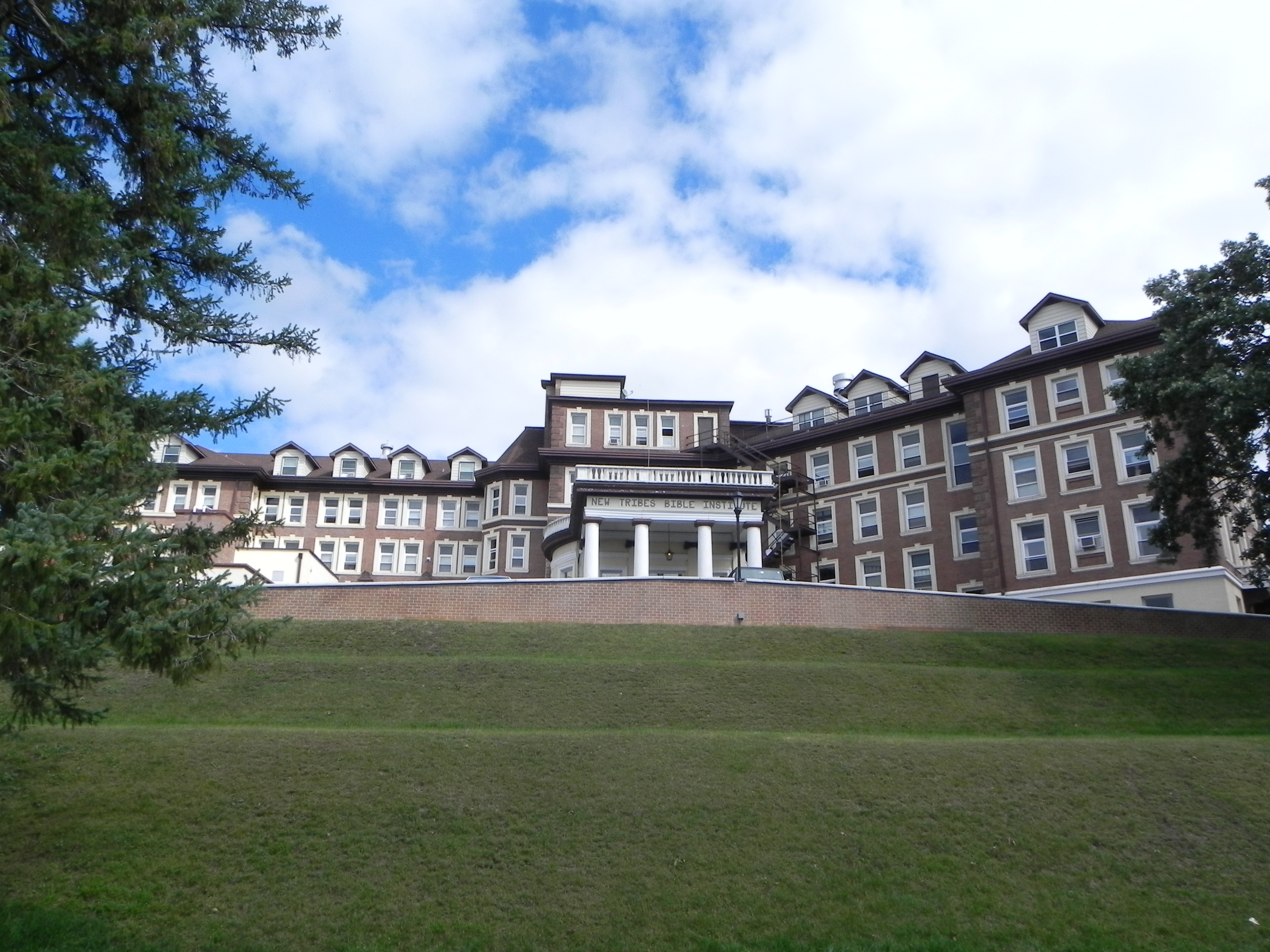
Resthaven Hotel in Waukesha

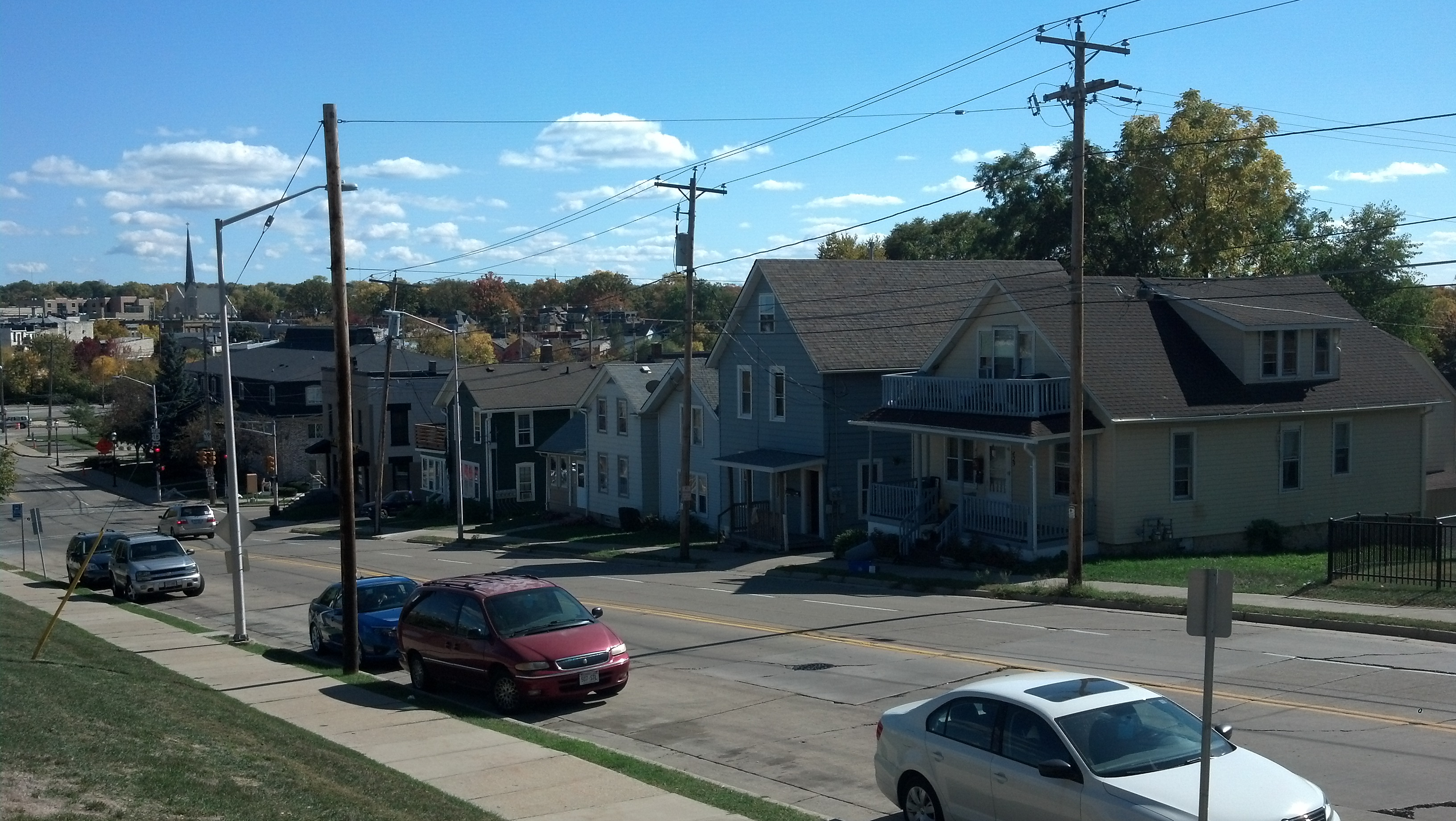
Madison Street Historic District in the city of Waukesha

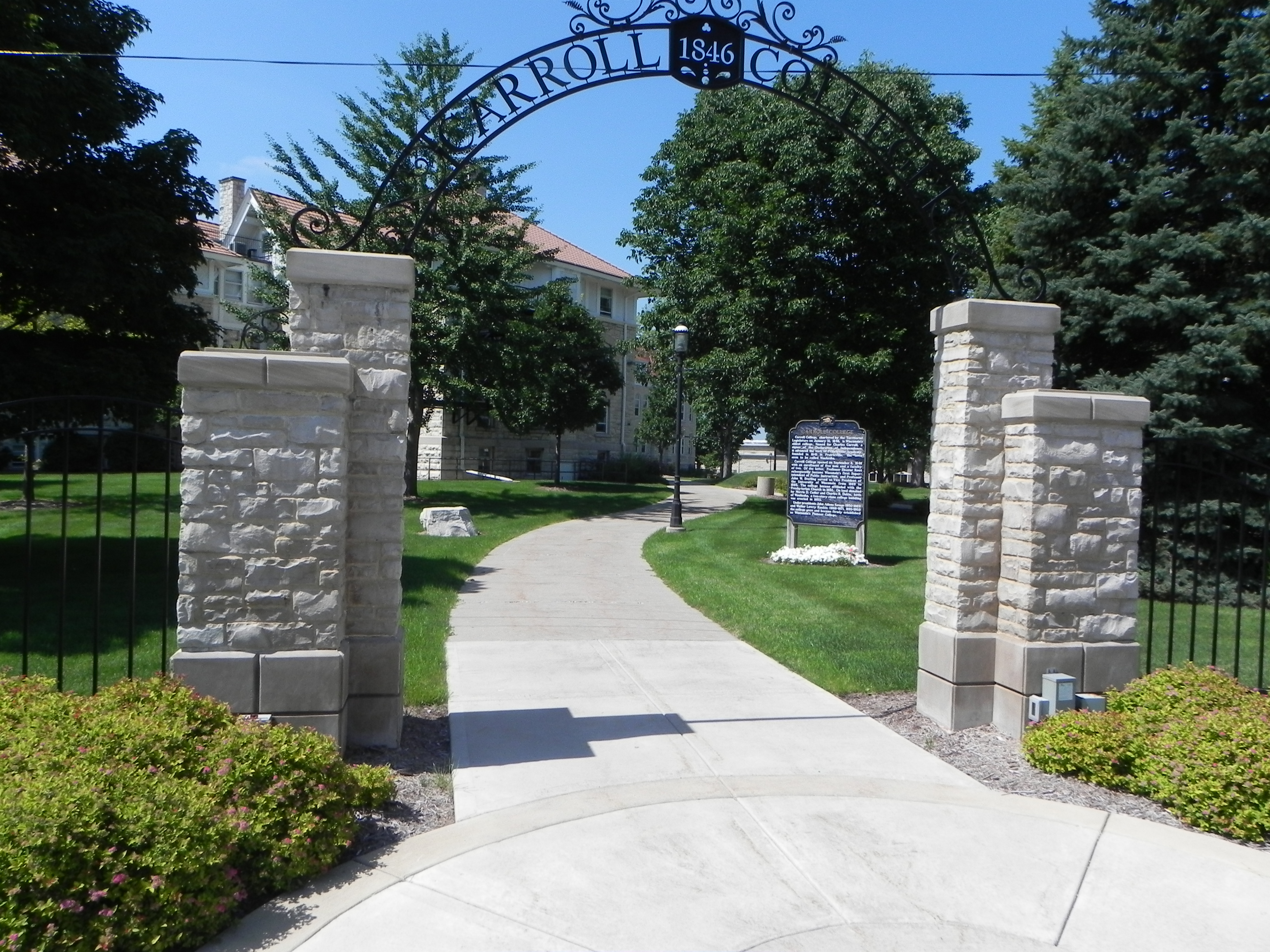
Carroll University

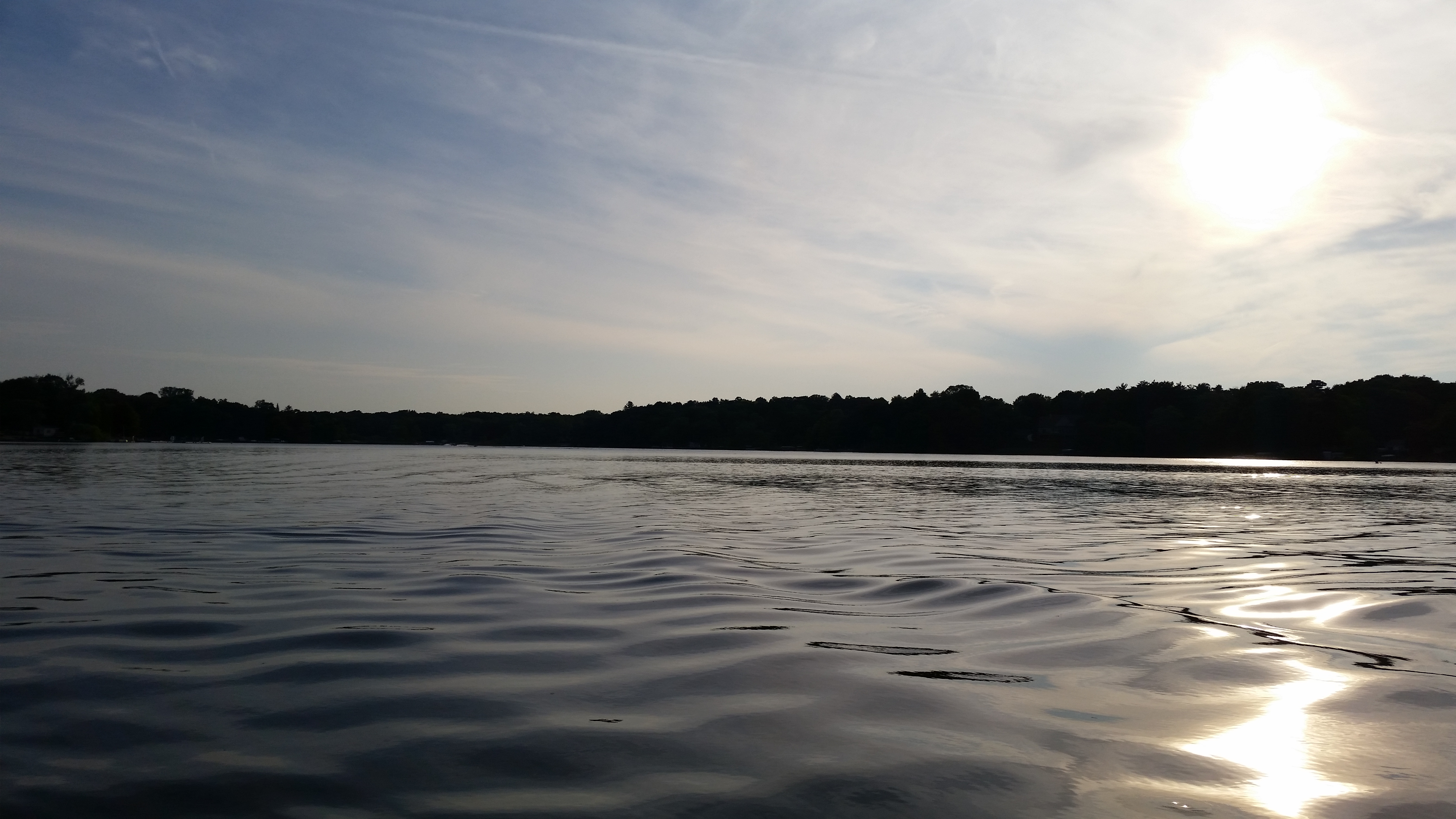
Upper Phantom Lake in Mukwonago

== History ==
The boundaries of districts have changed over history. Previous politicians of a specific numbered district often represented a different geographic area, due to redistricting.

The 28th District was created in 1856, when the Senate was expanded from 25 to 30 members. At that time, it consisted of Burnett, Chippewa, Clark, Dallas (later renamed Barron), Douglas, Dunn County, La Pointe (later renamed Bayfield), Pepin, Pierce, Polk, and St. Croix Counties.

The first Senator from the 28th was William Wilson of Menomonie, who served in the 1857 session (the tenth session of the Wisconsin Legislature). As of the redistricting of 1861, the 28th now consisted of Ashland, Burnett, Dallas (later renamed Barron), Douglas, La Pointe (later renamed Bayfield), Pierce, Polk, and St. Croix counties (it was not changed in the redistricting of 1866).

The district was entirely changed for the 1871 election, being changed into one consisting of Crawford and Richland counties. In 1876, the district was changed again: it dropped Crawford County, and would instead consist of Iowa and Richland counties for many years.

An 1892 special session of the legislature declared that, The counties of Iowa and Lafayette and the towns of Cassvilla, Clifton, Ellenborough, Harrison, Hazel Green, Jamestown, Liberty, Lima, Paris, Platteville, Potosi, Smelser, Waterloo and Glen Haven in the county of Grant were now the 28th District.

The Legislature redistricted once again, and the 28th would consist of Crawford County, Wisconsin, Richland and Vernon counties for two terms. In the 1901 session of the legislature, another redistricting removed Crawford County from the district. The 1911 redistricting completely changed the district boundaries, moving it to Chippewa and Eau Claire counties—these boundaries would remain consistent for the next fifty years.

In May 1964, the Wisconsin Supreme Court ordered a complete redistricting and re-numbering of all Wisconsin Senate districts. As a result, the 28th, which had historically been a northern and western Wisconsin district, was now a district consisting of portions of Milwaukee County (villages of Greendale and Hales Corners; and the cities of Franklin and Greenfield); Racine County (towns of Burlington, Caledonia, Dover, Norway, Raymond, Rochester, Waterford and Yorkville; the villages of Rochester, Union Grove and Waterford; and the city of Burlington); and Waukesha County (towns of Eagle, Mukwonago, Muskego, Ottawa, Summit and Vernon; the villages of Big Bend, Dousman, Eagle, Mukwongo and Oconomowoc Lake; and the city of New Berlin). Since 1964, the district has remained in the same general vicinity, at the meeting point between southwest Milwaukee County, southeast Waukesha County, northwest Racine County, and northeast Walworth County, with slight variations in boundaries between those four counties.

== Past senators ==
Previous senators include:

Senator	Party	Notes	Session	Years	District Definition
District created by 1856 Wisc. Act 109.				1856	Burnett, Chippewa, Clark, Douglas, Dunn, La Pointe, Pepin, Pierce, Polk, and St. Croix counties
William Wilson	Rep.		10th	1857	Burnett, Chippewa, Clark, Douglas, Dunn, La Pointe, Pepin, Pierce, Polk, and St. Croix counties
Daniel Mears	Dem.		11th	1858	Burnett, Chippewa, Clark, Douglas, Dunn, La Pointe, Pepin, Pierce, Polk, and St. Croix counties
Daniel Mears	Dem.		12th	1859	Burnett, Chippewa, Clark, Douglas, Dunn, La Pointe, Pepin, Pierce, Polk, and St. Croix counties
Charles B. Cox	Rep.		13th	1860	Burnett, Chippewa, Clark, Douglas, Dunn, La Pointe, Pepin, Pierce, Polk, and St. Croix counties
Charles B. Cox	Rep.		14th	1861	Burnett, Chippewa, Clark, Douglas, Dunn, La Pointe, Pepin, Pierce, Polk, and St. Croix counties
Herman L. Humphrey	Rep.		15th	1862	Ashland, Burnett, Dallas, Douglas, La Pointe, Pierce, Polk, and St. Croix counties
Herman L. Humphrey	Rep.		16th	1863	Ashland, Burnett, Dallas, Douglas, La Pointe, Pierce, Polk, and St. Croix counties
Austin H. Young	Natl. Union		17th	1864	Ashland, Burnett, Dallas, Douglas, La Pointe, Pierce, Polk, and St. Croix counties
Austin H. Young	Natl. Union		18th	1865	Ashland, Burnett, Dallas, Douglas, La Pointe, Pierce, Polk, and St. Croix counties
Marcus Fulton	Natl. Union		19th	1866	Ashland, Burnett, Dallas, Douglas, La Pointe, Pierce, Polk, and St. Croix counties
Marcus Fulton	Natl. Union		20th	1867	Ashland, Bayfield, Burnett, Dallas, Douglas, Pierce, Polk, and St. Croix counties
William J. Copp	Rep.		21st	1868	Ashland, Bayfield, Burnett, Dallas, Douglas, Pierce, Polk, and St. Croix counties
William J. Copp	Rep.		22nd	1869	Ashland, Bayfield, Burnett, Dallas, Douglas, Pierce, Polk, and St. Croix counties
Edward H. Ives	Dem.		23rd	1870	Ashland, Bayfield, Burnett, Dallas, Douglas, Pierce, Polk, and St. Croix counties
Edward H. Ives	Dem.		24th	1871	Ashland, Bayfield, Burnett, Dallas, Douglas, Pierce, Polk, and St. Croix counties
Henry L. Eaton	Rep.		25th	1872	Crawford and Richland counties
Henry L. Eaton	Rep.		26th	1873	Crawford and Richland counties
George Krouskop	Dem.		27th	1874	Crawford and Richland counties
George Krouskop	Dem.		28th	1875	Crawford and Richland counties
Daniel Downs	Rep.		29th	1876	Crawford and Richland counties
Daniel Downs	Rep.		30th	1877	Iowa and Richland counties 1880 population: 41,802; 1885 population: 48,175
Archibald Campbell	Rep.		31st	1878	Iowa and Richland counties 1880 population: 41,802; 1885 population: 48,175
Archibald Campbell	Rep.		32nd	1879	Iowa and Richland counties 1880 population: 41,802; 1885 population: 48,175
Joseph McGrew	Rep.		33rd	1880	Iowa and Richland counties 1880 population: 41,802; 1885 population: 48,175
Joseph McGrew	Rep.		34th	1881	Iowa and Richland counties 1880 population: 41,802; 1885 population: 48,175
William C. Meffert	Rep.		35th	1882	Iowa and Richland counties 1880 population: 41,802; 1885 population: 48,175
William C. Meffert	Rep.		36th	1883–1884	Iowa and Richland counties 1880 population: 41,802; 1885 population: 48,175
Norman L. James	Rep.		37th	1885–1886	Iowa and Richland counties 1880 population: 41,802; 1885 population: 48,175
Norman L. James	Rep.		38th	1887–1888	Iowa and Richland counties 1880 population: 41,802; 1885 population: 48,175
Robert Joiner	Rep.		39th	1889–1890	Iowa and Richland counties 1880 population: 41,802; 1885 population: 48,175
Robert Joiner	Rep.		40th	1891–1892	Iowa and Richland counties 1880 population: 41,802; 1885 population: 48,175
Calvert Spensley	Rep.		41st	1893–1894	Iowa and Richland counties and Southern Grant County
Calvert Spensley	Rep.		42nd	1895–1896	Iowa and Richland counties and Southern Grant County
Oliver Munson	Rep.		43rd	1897–1898	Crawford, Richland, and Vernon counties 1895 population: 63,857
Oliver Munson	Rep.		44th	1899–1900	Crawford, Richland, and Vernon counties 1895 population: 63,857
Oliver Munson	Rep.		45th	1901–1902	Crawford, Richland, and Vernon counties 1895 population: 63,857
Oliver Munson	Rep.		46th	1903–1904	Richland and Vernon counties 1900 population: 47,834
Oliver Munson	Rep.		47th	1905–1906	Richland and Vernon counties 1900 population: 47,834
Oliver Munson	Rep.		48th	1907–1908	Richland and Vernon counties 1900 population: 47,834
David G. James	Rep.		49th	1909–1910	Richland and Vernon counties 1900 population: 47,834
David G. James	Rep.		50th	1911–1912	Richland and Vernon counties 1900 population: 47,834
Edward Ackley	Rep.		51st	1913–1914	Chippewa and Eau Claire counties 1910 population: 64,824
Edward Ackley	Rep.		52nd	1915–1916	Chippewa and Eau Claire counties 1910 population: 64,824
Roy P. Wilcox	Rep.		53rd	1917–1918	Chippewa and Eau Claire counties 1910 population: 64,824
Roy P. Wilcox	Rep.		54th	1919–1920	Chippewa and Eau Claire counties 1910 population: 64,824
Herman Lange	Rep.		55th	1921–1922	Chippewa and Eau Claire counties 1910 population: 64,824
Herman Lange	Rep.		56th	1923–1924	Chippewa and Eau Claire counties 1910 population: 64,824
Herman Lange	Rep.		57th	1925–1926	Chippewa and Eau Claire counties 1910 population: 64,824
Herman Lange	Rep.		58th	1927–1928	Chippewa and Eau Claire counties 1910 population: 64,824
Peter J. Smith	Rep.		59th	1929–1930	Chippewa and Eau Claire counties 1910 population: 64,824
Peter J. Smith	Rep.		60th	1931–1932	Chippewa and Eau Claire counties 1910 population: 64,824
G. Erle Ingram	Rep.		61st	1933–1934	Chippewa and Eau Claire counties 1910 population: 64,824
G. Erle Ingram	Prog.		62nd	1935–1936	Chippewa and Eau Claire counties 1910 population: 64,824
G. Erle Ingram	Prog.		63rd	1937–1938	Chippewa and Eau Claire counties 1910 population: 64,824
G. Erle Ingram	Prog.		64th	1939–1940	Chippewa and Eau Claire counties 1910 population: 64,824
George H. Hipke	Rep.		65th	1941–1942	Chippewa and Eau Claire counties 1910 population: 64,824
George H. Hipke	Rep.		66th	1943–1944	Chippewa and Eau Claire counties 1910 population: 64,824
George H. Hipke	Rep.		67th	1945–1946	Chippewa and Eau Claire counties 1910 population: 64,824
George H. Hipke	Rep.		68th	1947–1948	Chippewa and Eau Claire counties 1910 population: 64,824
Arthur L. Padrutt	Rep.		69th	1949–1950	Chippewa and Eau Claire counties 1910 population: 64,824
Arthur L. Padrutt	Rep.		70th	1951–1952	Chippewa and Eau Claire counties 1910 population: 64,824
Arthur L. Padrutt	Rep.		71st	1953–1954	Chippewa and Eau Claire counties 1910 population: 64,824
Arthur L. Padrutt	Rep.		72nd	1955–1956	Chippewa and Eau Claire counties 1910 population: 64,824
Davis A. Donnelly	Dem.		73rd	1957–1958	Chippewa and Eau Claire counties 1910 population: 64,824
Davis A. Donnelly	Dem.		74th	1959–1960	Chippewa and Eau Claire counties 1910 population: 64,824
Davis A. Donnelly	Dem.		75th	1961–1962	Chippewa and Eau Claire counties 1910 population: 64,824
Davis A. Donnelly	Dem.		76th	1963–1964	Chippewa and Eau Claire counties 1910 population: 64,824
Taylor Benson	Dem.		77th	1965–1966	Most of Racine County; Southwest Milwaukee County; Southeast Waukesha County
Taylor Benson	Dem.		78th	1967–1968	Most of Racine County; Southwest Milwaukee County; Southeast Waukesha County
James Devitt	Rep.		79th	1969–1970	Most of Racine County; Southwest Milwaukee County; Southeast Waukesha County
James Devitt	Rep.		80th	1971–1972	Most of Racine County; Southwest Milwaukee County; Southeast Waukesha County
James Devitt	Rep.		81st	1973–1974	Most of Waukesha County; Part of Jefferson County; Part of Milwaukee County
James Devitt	Rep.		82nd	1975–1976	Most of Waukesha County; Part of Jefferson County; Part of Milwaukee County
Lynn Adelman	Dem.	Resigned Dec. 1997 after appointed U.S. District Judge, E.D. Wis.	83rd	1977–1978	Most of Waukesha County; Part of Jefferson County; Part of Milwaukee County
Lynn Adelman	Dem.	Resigned Dec. 1997 after appointed U.S. District Judge, E.D. Wis.	84th	1979–1980	Most of Waukesha County; Part of Jefferson County; Part of Milwaukee County
Lynn Adelman	Dem.	Resigned Dec. 1997 after appointed U.S. District Judge, E.D. Wis.	85th	1981–1982	Most of Waukesha County; Part of Jefferson County; Part of Milwaukee County
Lynn Adelman	Dem.	Resigned Dec. 1997 after appointed U.S. District Judge, E.D. Wis.	86th	1983–1984	Southwest Milwaukee County; Northwest Racine County; Southeast Waukesha County; Part of Walworth County
Lynn Adelman	Dem.	Resigned Dec. 1997 after appointed U.S. District Judge, E.D. Wis.	87th	1985–1986	Southwest Milwaukee County; Northwest Racine County; Southeast Waukesha County; Part of Walworth County
Lynn Adelman	Dem.	Resigned Dec. 1997 after appointed U.S. District Judge, E.D. Wis.	88th	1987–1988	Southwest Milwaukee County; Northwest Racine County; Southeast Waukesha County; Part of Walworth County
Lynn Adelman	Dem.	Resigned Dec. 1997 after appointed U.S. District Judge, E.D. Wis.	89th	1989–1990	Southwest Milwaukee County; Northwest Racine County; Southeast Waukesha County; Part of Walworth County
Lynn Adelman	Dem.	Resigned Dec. 1997 after appointed U.S. District Judge, E.D. Wis.	90th	1991–1992	Southwest Milwaukee County; Northwest Racine County; Southeast Waukesha County; Part of Walworth County
Lynn Adelman	Dem.	Resigned Dec. 1997 after appointed U.S. District Judge, E.D. Wis.	91st	1993–1994	Southwest Milwaukee County; Northwest Racine County; Southeast Waukesha County; Part of Walworth County
Lynn Adelman	Dem.	Resigned Dec. 1997 after appointed U.S. District Judge, E.D. Wis.	92nd	1995–1996	Southwest Milwaukee County; Northwest Racine County; Southeast Waukesha County; Part of Walworth County
Lynn Adelman	Dem.	Resigned Dec. 1997 after appointed U.S. District Judge, E.D. Wis.	93rd	1997–1998	Southwest Milwaukee County; Northwest Racine County; Southeast Waukesha County; Part of Walworth County
—Vacant--			93rd	1997–1998	Southwest Milwaukee County; Northwest Racine County; Southeast Waukesha County; Part of Walworth County
Mary Lazich	Rep.		93rd	1997–1998	Southwest Milwaukee County; Northwest Racine County; Southeast Waukesha County; Part of Walworth County
Mary Lazich	Rep.		94th	1999–2000	Southwest Milwaukee County; Northwest Racine County; Southeast Waukesha County; Part of Walworth County
Mary Lazich	Rep.		95th	2001–2002	Southwest Milwaukee County; Northwest Racine County; Southeast Waukesha County; Part of Walworth County
Mary Lazich	Rep.		96th	2003–2004	Southwest Milwaukee County; Southeast Waukesha County; Part of Racine County; Part of Walworth County
Mary Lazich	Rep.		97th	2005–2006	Southwest Milwaukee County; Southeast Waukesha County; Part of Racine County; Part of Walworth County
Mary Lazich	Rep.		98th	2007–2008	Southwest Milwaukee County; Southeast Waukesha County; Part of Racine County; Part of Walworth County
Mary Lazich	Rep.		99th	2009–2010	Southwest Milwaukee County; Southeast Waukesha County; Part of Racine County; Part of Walworth County
Mary Lazich	Rep.		100th	2011–2012	Southwest Milwaukee County; Southeast Waukesha County; Part of Racine County; Part of Walworth County
Mary Lazich	Rep.		101st	2013–2014	Southwest Milwaukee County; Southeast Waukesha County; Part of Racine County; Part of Walworth County
Mary Lazich	Rep.		102nd	2015–2016	Southwest Milwaukee County; Southeast Waukesha County; Part of Racine County; Part of Walworth County
Dave Craig	Rep.		103rd	2017–2018	Southwest Milwaukee County; Southeast Waukesha County; Part of Racine County; Part of Walworth County
Dave Craig	Rep.		104th	2019–2020	Southwest Milwaukee County; Southeast Waukesha County; Part of Racine County; Part of Walworth County
Julian Bradley	Rep.	Elected 2020. Re-elected 2024.	105th	2021–2022	Southwest Milwaukee County; Southeast Waukesha County; Part of Racine County; Part of Walworth County
Julian Bradley	Rep.	Elected 2020. Re-elected 2024.	106th	2023–2024	Southwest Milwaukee County, southern Waukesha County, northwest Racine County, northeast Walworth County
Julian Bradley	Rep.	Elected 2020. Re-elected 2024.	107th	2025–2026	
