= Senator Lange =

Senator Lange may refer to:

- Herman Lange (1858–1938), Wisconsin State Senate
- Roberta Lange (born 1957), Nevada State Senate

== See also ==
- Senator Lang (disambiguation)
