= William Dixon (state representative) =

American politician

Member of the Wisconsin State Assembly
- In office January 1, 1872 – January 6, 1873
- Preceded by: Elihu Bailey (whole county)
- Succeeded by: Norman L. James
- Constituency: Richland 1st district
- In office January 3, 1859 – January 3, 1860
- Preceded by: Charles Rodolf
- Succeeded by: Jeremiah L. Jackson
- Constituency: Richland district

Personal details
- Born: October 27, 1808 Beverley, Yorkshire, U.K.
- Died: October 9, 1887 (aged 78)
- Resting place: Bear Valley Cemetery, Bear Valley, Wisconsin
- Party: Republican
- Spouse: Phila Carswell (m. 1830–1887)
- Children: Adeline (Runyan); (b. 1833; died 1861)

William Dixon (October 27, 1808 – October 9, 1887) was an English American immigrant, farmer, and Republican politician. He served two terms in the Wisconsin State Assembly, representing Richland County.

== Biography ==
Dixon was born on October 27, 1808, in Beverley, England. He married Philia Carswell in 1830. He immigrated to Oneida County, New York, in 1834. He later owned a farm in Exeter, New York, before renting one in Buena Vista, Richland County, Wisconsin, and eventually owning another in Ithaca, Wisconsin, in 1855. He died on October 9, 1887, and was buried in Bear Valley Cemetery in Bear Valley, Wisconsin.

== Political career ==
Dixon was a member of the Assembly during the 1859 and 1872 sessions. Other positions he held include Chairman of the Town Board (similar to city council) of Ithaca. He was a Republican.

Wisconsin State Assembly
Preceded by Charles Rodolf	Member of the Wisconsin State Assembly from the Richland district January 3, 1859 – January 2, 1860	Succeeded by Jeremiah L. Jackson
Preceded by Elihu Bailey (whole county)	Member of the Wisconsin State Assembly from the Richland 1st district January 1, 1872 – January 6, 1873	Succeeded by Norman L. James
