= Spensley =

Spensley is a surname. Notable people by that name include:

- Calvert Spensley (1846–1924), member of the Wisconsin State Senate.
- Howard Spensley (1834-1902), Australian lawyer and British Liberal politician.
- James Richardson Spensley (1867–1915), English doctor, footballer, manager, Scout Leader and medic from Stoke Newington.
- Philip Calvert Spensley (1920–1994), British tropical scientist.
