= William C. Meffert =

19th century American politician

Member of the Wisconsin Senate from the 28th district
- In office January 2, 1882 – January 5, 1885
- Preceded by: Joseph McGrew
- Succeeded by: Norman L. James

Personal details
- Born: December 23, 1842 Ems, Rhine Province, Kingdom of Prussia
- Died: March 21, 1918 (aged 75) Grant County, Wisconsin, U.S.
- Resting place: Arena Cemetery, Arena, Wisconsin
- Party: Republican
- Spouse: Delila Rubado (died 1934)
- Occupation: Saddle and harness maker

Military service
- Allegiance: United States
- Branch/service: United States Volunteers; Union Army
- Years of service: 1861–1865
- Rank: Corporal, USV
- Unit: 3rd Reg. Wis. Vol. Infantry
- Battles/wars: American Civil War

William C. Meffert (December 23, 1842 – March 21, 1918) was a German American immigrant, leatherworker, politician, and Wisconsin pioneer. He was a member of the Wisconsin State Senate, representing Iowa and Richland counties in 1882 and 1883. Earlier in life, he served as an enlisted volunteer in the Union Army throughout the American Civil War.

== Biography ==
William C. Meffert was born on December 23, 1842, in the town of Bad Ems, in what was then the Rhine Province in the Kingdom of Prussia. He emigrated to the United States with his parents in 1845. They came first to Milwaukee, then settled at Mineral Point, in the Wisconsin Territory. His father and sister died of cholera in 1852. The remainder of the family moved to Dodgeville, Wisconsin, in Iowa County, where William apprenticed as a leatherworker and saddlemaker.

At the outbreak of the American Civil War, he volunteered for service in the Union Army and was enrolled as a private in Company H of the 3rd Wisconsin Infantry Regiment. He was made the color-bearer for the regiment. The regiment was sent to the Eastern Theater of the war. With the regiment, he participated in the Shenandoah Valley campaign of 1862, the Battle of Antietam, and the Battle of Gettysburg. After Gettysburg, the regiment went to assist in quelling the New York City draft riots.

After New York, Meffert's three-year enlistment was set to expire and he re-enlisted as a veteran. The regiment joined the Atlanta campaign of William Tecumseh Sherman, then participated in the March to the Sea and the Carolinas campaign, ending the war occupying Raleigh, North Carolina.

After the war, Meffert wrote a short account of an incident at the Battle of Chancellorsville, where his company spontaneously charged a Confederate company without orders and captured it, but two of his friends were wounded in the process and ended up left on the battlefield for twelve days. The men were captured and re-united 25 years later in Wisconsin. Meffert also maintained an extensive diary through his war service, which was donated to the Wisconsin Historical Society after his death.

Meffert moved to Arena, Wisconsin, in 1867. In 1874, he became a part-owner of the newspaper the Arena Star and remained for two years. He was elected to the Wisconsin State Senate in 1881 and served in the 1882 and 1883 sessions of the Legislature. He was not a candidate for re-election in 1884.

== Electoral history ==
=== Wisconsin Senate (1881) ===
Wisconsin Senate, 28th District Election, 1881
Party	Candidate	Votes	%	±%
General Election, November 8, 1881
Republican	William C. Meffert	2,943	52.02%	−10.45%
Democratic	J. L. R. McCollum	2,714	47.98%	
Plurality		229	4.05%	-20.90%
Total votes		5,657	100.0%	+2.41%
Republican hold				

== Works ==
- Meffert, William C. (1908). An Incident of Chancellorsville, 1863. E. O. Kimberley.

Wisconsin Senate
Preceded by Joseph McGrew	Member of the Wisconsin Senate from the 28th district January 2, 1882 – January 5, 1885	Succeeded by Norman L. James
