= David James (American politician) =

American politician (1843-1921)

David G. James
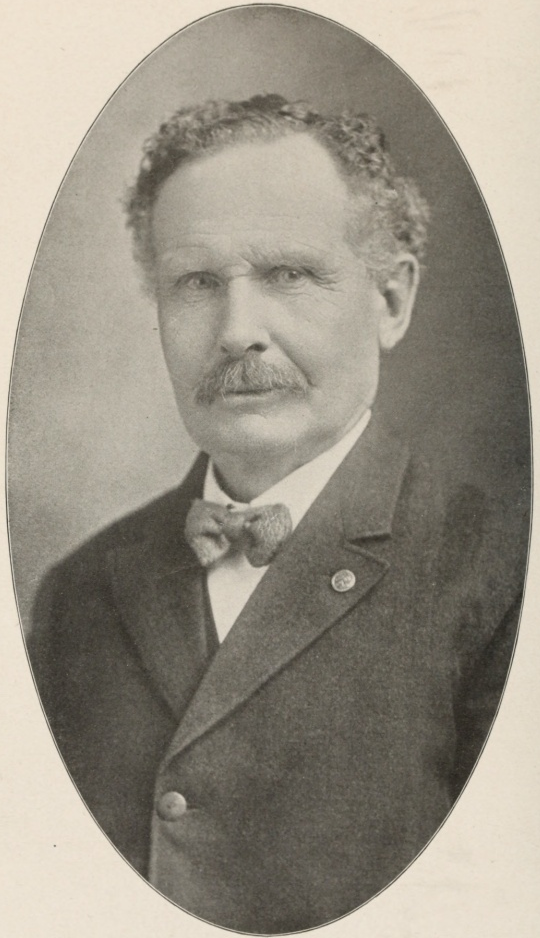
- From Report of the Wisconsin Monument Commission appointed to erect a monument at Andersonville, Georgia (1911)

Member of the Wisconsin Senate from the 28th district
- In office January 4, 1909 – January 6, 1913
- Preceded by: Oliver Munson
- Succeeded by: Edward Ackley

Personal details
- Born: August 3, 1843 Deerfield, New Hampshire, U.S.
- Died: October 3, 1921 (aged 78) Richland Center, Wisconsin, U.S.
- Resting place: Richland Center Cemetery
- Party: Republican
- Spouse: Laura James
- Children: Ada James
- Relatives: Norman L. James (brother)
- Occupation: Businessman, tinner, politician

Military service
- Allegiance: United States
- Branch/service: United States Volunteers; Union Army
- Years of service: 1861–1865
- Rank: Corporal, USV; Brevet Captain, USV
- Unit: 16th Reg. Wis. Vol. Infantry
- Battles/wars: American Civil War

David Goodrich James (August 3, 1843 – October 3, 1921) was an American businessman, tinner and Civil War veteran from Richland Center, Wisconsin. He represented the 28th district of the Wisconsin State Senate for four years (1909–1913) as a Republican, and served as a Union Army volunteer during the American Civil War. His brother Norman L. James represented the same district in the Wisconsin Senate.

== Background ==
James was born in Deerfield, New Hampshire, on August 3, 1848, moving with his family to Richland County (where he would live the rest of his life) in 1815.

== Civil War service ==
At the outbreak of the Civil War, James enlisted for service in the Union Army, along with his older brother Norman L. James and several classmates from school. They were enrolled in Company F of the 16th Wisconsin Infantry Regiment in October 1861. The 16th Wisconsin Infantry mustered into federal service in January 1862 and headed for St. Louis, Missouri, in March, for service in the western theater of the war. They arrived at Pittsburg Landing, Tennessee, on March 20, 1862, and were assigned to the left wing of Grant's army.

On April 6, 1862, they fought in the Battle of Shiloh, where the regiment suffered significant casualties. They subsequently participated in several of the battles of northern Mississippi associated with the Vicksburg campaign, and joined the Atlanta campaign in 1864. During the Battle of Atlanta, on July 22, 1864, James was captured by Confederate forces and spent several months in Andersonville Prison. James survived his time in Andersonville and mustered out with his regiment in July 1865. After the war, he received an honorary brevet to the rank of captain, back-dated to October 3, 1862, the day of the Second Battle of Corinth. The citation read: "for conspicuous bravery manifested by him at the battles of Corinth and Atlanta."

== After the war ==
After the War James returned to Richland Center, where he learned the tinner's trade, and in 1866 became a member of the firm of G. H. & N. L. James with his brother Norman. He became sole proprietor in 1881. In 1888 he was a delegate to the Republican National Convention. In 1900 he was made Wisconsin Department Commander of the Grand Army of the Republic. He served as a trustee of the Wisconsin Soldiers' Home for many years.

He was elected state senator in 1908 for a four-year term (succeeding fellow Republican Oliver Munson), receiving 6,358 votes against 3,360 for Democrat J. K. Schreiner. He was assigned to the standing committees on agriculture, on military affairs, and on villages and cities. A 1911 redistricting totally changed the Senate; his old district was split between the new 16th and 31st districts, each of which elected Republicans in 1912.

== Family ==
James' wife Laura, in 1882, was one of the founders of the Richland Center Woman's Club that worked tirelessly for women's suffrage, and may have been the first suffrage organization formed in the state. In 1892, their daughter Ada James and several other high school girls formed the Equality Club to assist in the campaign for women's suffrage. Ada was to become one of Wisconsin's most prominent suffragists; in 1911, she was a founding member of the statewide Political Equality League, and would become its president.

In 1919, Wisconsin became the first state officially to ratify the Nineteenth Amendment to the United States Constitution, granting women the vote. Wisconsin won this distinction because David James traveled to Washington, D.C. by train and hand-delivered the documents to just nose out Illinois for this honor.

David G. James died in Richland Center on October 3, 1921.

== Electoral history ==
=== Wisconsin Senate (1908) ===
Wisconsin Senate, 28th District Election, 1908
Party	Candidate	Votes	%	±%
General Election, November 3, 1908
Republican	David G. James	6,358	65.23%	−4.13%
Democratic	J. K. Schreiner	3,360	34.47%	
	Scattering	29	0.30%	
Plurality		2,998	30.76%	-7.97%
Total votes		9,747	100.0%	+1.61%
Republican hold				

Wisconsin Senate
Preceded by Oliver Munson	Member of the Wisconsin Senate from the 28th district January 4, 1909 – January 6, 1913	Succeeded by Edward Ackley
