= J. L. R. McCollum =

American politician

J. L. R. McCollum (January 4, 1842 – July 3, 1931) was a member of the Wisconsin State Assembly.

== Biography ==
McCollum was born on January 4, 1842, in Leicester, Massachusetts. He graduated from a school that is now known as Bryant & Stratton College in 1864. On March 15 of that year, McCollum married Eliza Seaman Krouskop. They had three children. He died on July 3, 1931, in Richland, Richland County, Wisconsin, and was buried in Sextonville, Wisconsin.

== Career ==
McCollum was a member of the Assembly in 1876 and 1877. He was a Democrat.
