= Oliver Munson =

American politician (1856-1933)

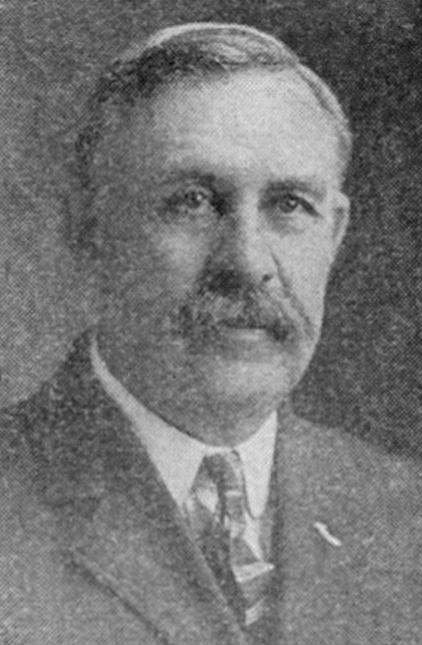

Chief Clerk of the Wisconsin Senate
- In office January 12, 1927 – January 1, 1931
- Preceded by: F. W. Schoenfeld
- Succeeded by: R. A. Cobban
- In office January 8, 1913 – January 1, 1923
- Preceded by: Fred M. Wylie
- Succeeded by: F. W. Schoenfeld

Member of the Wisconsin Senate from the 28th district
- In office January 4, 1897 – January 4, 1909
- Preceded by: Calvert Spensley
- Succeeded by: David James

Personal details
- Born: March 2, 1856 Cresco, Iowa, U.S.
- Died: October 24, 1933 (aged 77) Rochester, Minnesota, U.S.
- Resting place: Viroqua Cemetery, Viroqua, Wisconsin
- Party: Republican
- Spouse: Josephine Cecelia Downs (m. 1881; died 1917)
- Children: 7
- Occupation: Newspaper editor, publisher

Oliver Goldsmith Munson (March 2, 1856 – October 24, 1933) was an American newspaper publisher, clerk, and Republican politician. He was a member of the Wisconsin Senate for three terms, representing Wisconsin's 28th Senate district from 1897 through 1909. He also served as private secretary to Wisconsin Governor James O. Davidson and was chief clerk of the Wisconsin Senate for seven sessions.

== Biography ==
Munson was born Oliver Goldsmith Munson in what is now Cresco, Iowa, on March 2, 1856. He moved to Richland Center, Wisconsin, in 1876 and to Viroqua, Wisconsin, in 1885. In 1881, Munson married Josephine C. Downs. They had four children. Munson died in 1933.

== Career ==
Munson was a member of the Senate from 1897 to 1908. Later, he was Chief Clerk of the Senate from 1915 to 1923 and again from 1927 to 1931. Previously, Munson was Clerk of Richland Center and a member of the board of supervisors of Vernon County, Wisconsin. He was a Republican.

Wisconsin Senate
Preceded by Calvert Spensley	Member of the Wisconsin Senate from the 28th district January 4, 1897 – January 4, 1909	Succeeded by David James
Preceded by Fred M. Wylie	Chief Clerk of the Wisconsin Senate; January 8, 1913 – January 1, 1923	Succeeded by F. W. Schoenfeld
Preceded by F. W. Schoenfeld	Chief Clerk of the Wisconsin Senate; January 12, 1927 – January 1, 1931	Succeeded by R. A. Cobban
