= Senator Mears =

Senator Mears may refer to:

- Charles Mears (1814–1895), Michigan State Senate
- Daniel Mears (politician) (1819–1906), Wisconsin State Senate
