= Harley A. Martin =

American farmer and politician

Harley A. Martin (January 3, 1880 – August 21, 1951) was an American farmer and politician.

Born in Cottonwood Falls, Kansas, Martin and his parents moved to a farm in the Town of Buena Vista, Richland County, Wisconsin in 1884. Martin graduated from the Sextonville, Wisconsin High School, went to the Wisconsin Business College, and then took a short course in agriculture at the University of Wisconsin. Martin and his father raised Red Poll cattle at the farm. In 1919, Martin and his wife moved to Richland Center, Wisconsin. Martin served on a rural school board and on the Richland Center School Board and was a Democrat. Martin was also an Independent. From 1927 to 1931 and from 1933 to 1935, Martin served in the Wisconsin State Assembly. In 1929, the Governor of Wisconsin Albert Schmedeman appointed Martin to the Wisconsin State Office Building Commission and served until 1949 as secretary of the commission. Martin died at his home in Richland Center, Wisconsin.
