= Santa Rosa Memorial Park =

Cemetery in Santa Rosa, California

Details
- Established: 1885
- Location: 1900 Franklin Avenue, Santa Rosa, California
- Country: United States
- Coordinates: 38°27′25″N 122°42′22″W
- Type: Traditional
- Owned by: Santa Rosa Memorial Park
- Find a Grave: Santa Rosa Memorial Park

Santa Rosa Memorial Park is a cemetery located in Santa Rosa, California. It consists of two cemeteries: the Santa Rosa Memorial Park and the Santa Rosa Odd Fellows Cemetery.

== History ==
Santa Rosa Memorial Park was established at the Odd Fellows Cemetery in 1885 by Odd Fellows Lodge No. 53 of Santa Rosa. The original plots of the cemetery, which now make up the Odd Fellows Cemetery section, are located on the northern slope of the hill which contains the adjacent Santa Rosa Rural Cemetery. During the 20th century, the cemetery expanded to over forty-acres, and is the largest cemetery in Santa Rosa with nearly 25,000 burials. Today the cemetery is no longer associated with the Independent Order of Odd Fellows and is privately owned.

== Notable burials ==
=== Odd Fellows Cemetery ===
- Ellsworth Burnett, (1836-1895) American Civil War veteran and Member of the Wisconsin State Assembly (1877-1878)
- Charles B. Cox, (1810-1891) pioneer and Member of the Wisconsin State Senate (1860-1862) and Wisconsin State Assembly (1863-1864)
- Frank Pierce Doyle, (1863-1948) banker and philanthropist
- Charles O. Dunbar, (1871-1934) newspaper publisher, politician, and Member of the California State Assembly (1903-1905)
- George A. Johnson, (1829-1894) Attorney General of California (1887-1891)
- Clarence F. Lea, (1874-1964) Member of Congress (1917-1949)
- Robert Ripley, (1890-1949) cartoonist and creator of Ripley's Believe It or Not!
- George Harrison Shull, (1874-1954) plant geneticist

=== Santa Rosa Memorial Park ===
- Connie Marshall, (1933-2001) child television and film actress
