= Gotham, Wisconsin =

Census-designated place in Wisconsin, United States

Gotham
- Census-designated place
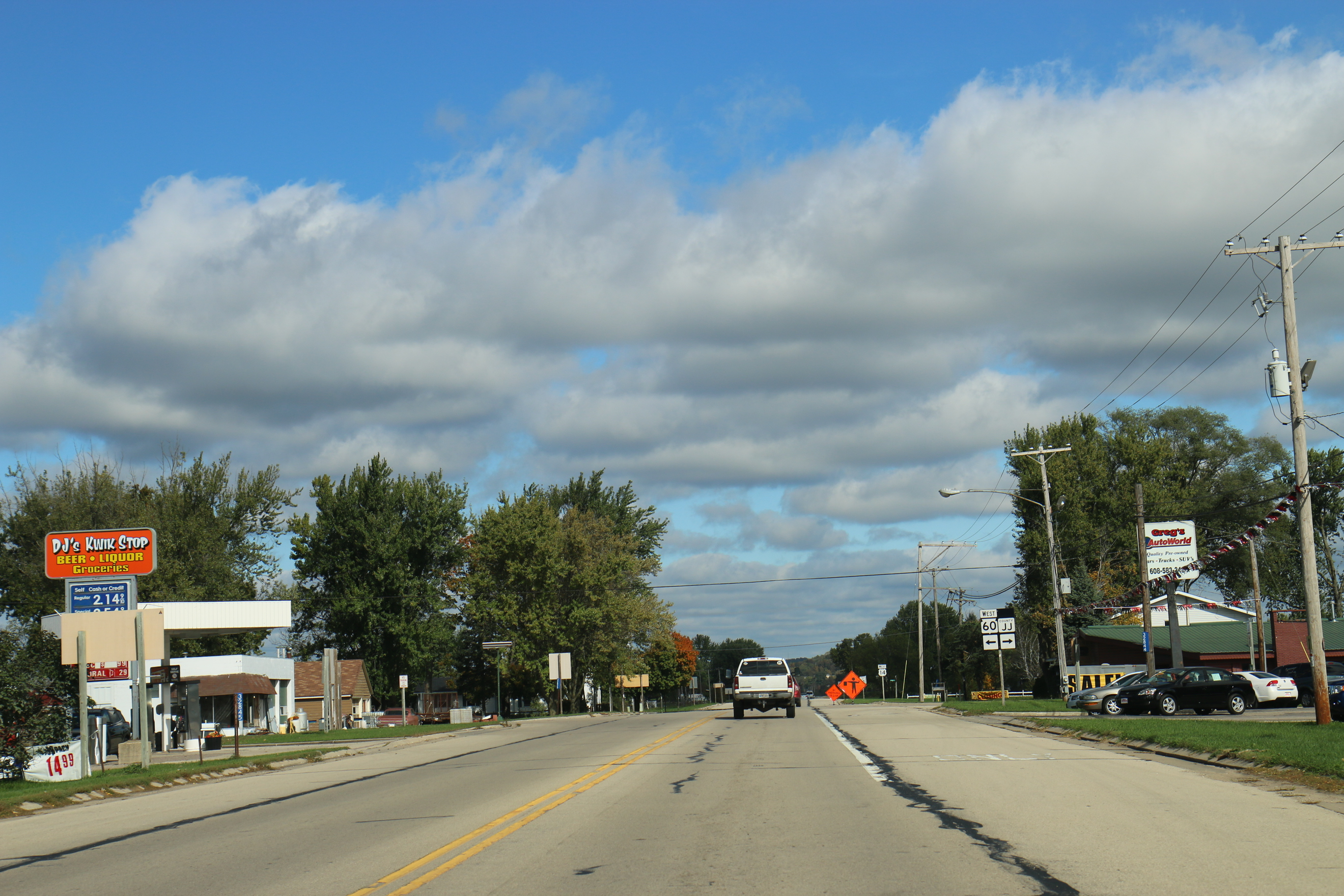
- Downtown Gotham on WIS60

- Location within the state of Wisconsin
- Coordinates: 43°13′23″N 90°17′28″W
- Country: United States
- State: Wisconsin
- County: Buena Vista, Richland

Area
  - Total: 0.398 sq mi (1.03 km^{2})
  - Land: 0.398 sq mi (1.03 km^{2})
  - Water: 0 sq mi (0 km^{2})

Population (2020)
  - Total: 189
  - Density: 475/sq mi (183/km^{2})
- Time zone: UTC-6 (Central (CST))
  - Summer (DST): UTC-5 (CDT)
- Area code: 608

Gotham (also Richland City) is a census-designated place, in the town of Buena Vista, in Richland County, Wisconsin, United States. It is located at the intersection of Wisconsin Highway 60 and U.S. Route 14. It is just north of the Wisconsin River, northeast of Avoca and southeast of Richland Center. As of the 2020 census, its population was 189.

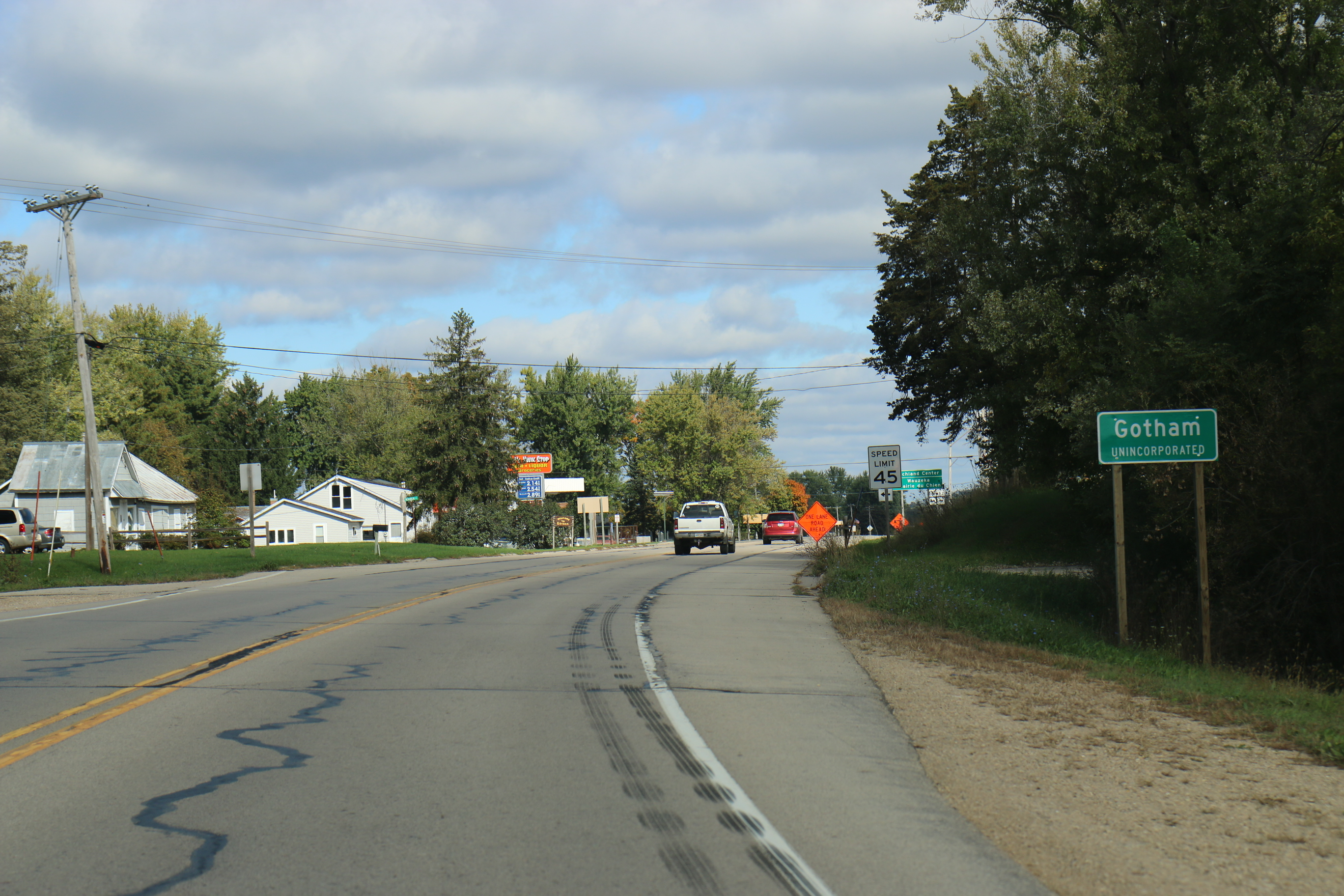
Looking west at the sign for Gotham on WIS60

== History ==
The name Gotham came from Captain Myron Wheeler Gotham (1842–1902), who once resided in the village. Gotham died with his sons, Lucius and Myron, during a violent storm in the Great Lakes in 1902.

== Demographics ==
Historical population
Census	Pop.	Note	%±
2010	191		—
2020	189		−1.0%
U.S. Decennial Census

== See also ==
- List of census-designated places in Wisconsin
