= Daniel Mears (politician) =

19th century American politician

Member of the Wisconsin Senate from the 28th district
- In office January 4, 1858 – January 2, 1860
- Preceded by: William Wilson
- Succeeded by: Charles B. Cox

Personal details
- Born: July 28, 1819 Lynn, Massachusetts, U.S.
- Died: September 22, 1906 (aged 87) Osceola, Wisconsin, U.S.
- Resting place: Mount Hope Cemetery, Osceola, Wisconsin
- Party: Democratic
- Spouses: Emeline E. Mendum (m. 1843; died 1850); Susan Florence Thomson (m. 1852; died 1897)
- Children: Charles Edward Mears^{(b. 1844; died 1913)}; David Augustes Mears^{(b. 1845; died 1904)}; Daniel Washington Mears^{(b. 1847; died 1910)}; Laura M. "Lulu" (Wheeler)^{(b. 1853)}
- Occupation: Lumberman, timber agent

Military service
- Branch/service: United States Volunteers; Union Army
- Years of service: 1861–1862
- Rank: 2nd Lieutenant, USV
- Unit: 2nd Reg. Wis. Vol. Cavalry
- Battles/wars: American Civil War

Daniel Mears Jr. (July 28, 1819 – September 22, 1906) was an American lumberman, Democratic politician, and Wisconsin pioneer. He was a member of the Wisconsin Senate, representing the vast northwest quadrant of the state during the 1858 and 1859 sessions.

== Biography ==
Daniel Mears was born in Lynn, Massachusetts, in July 1819. He came west in 1848, first settling at Taylors Falls, Minnesota Territory, where he operated a store for a year. In 1849, he moved across the Mississippi River to St. Croix Falls, Wisconsin, where he continued his merchandising and also began working in the lumber industry, with the lumber firm Nelson Carlton Company. In 1852, he moved to Hudson, Wisconsin, where he constructed the first saw mill in the village. He ultimately moved to a farm in Osceola, Wisconsin, about 1855, where he remained for the rest of his life.

In 1857 he was the Democratic Party nominee for Wisconsin Senate in the vast 28th Senate district, which then comprised nearly the entire northwest quadrant of the state. He won the election due to a split Republican vote; the original Republican nominee George Strong faced a divided party and withdrew from the race a week before the election, his opponent James F. Moore, claimed he was then the Republican nominee, but still faced significant resistance within the district's Republican electorate. Mears went on to represent the 28th district in the 1858 and 1859 legislative sessions.

After the outbreak of the American Civil War, Mears assisted in raising several companies of volunteers for the Union Army, and entered the service himself with a company of cavalry known as the "St. Croix Rangers", which elected him as their second lieutenant. His company became Company D of the 2nd Wisconsin Infantry Regiment, but Mears only served briefly. He mustered into federal service in December 1861 and resigned in April 1862.

He ran again for state office in 1872, running for Wisconsin State Assembly in the district comprising Ashland, Barron, Bayfield, Burnett, Douglas, and Polk counties. He was defeated in the general election by Republican Henry D. Barron.

In 1874 he received the coveted official posting of state timber agent.

Daniel Mears died at his home in Osceola on September 22, 1906.

== Personal life and family ==
Daniel Mears married twice. He married Emeline E. Mendum at Boston in June 1843. They had at least three children together before her death in 1850. Two years later, Mears married again, this time to Susan Florence Thomson. They had at least one more child. Susan Mears died in 1897, after 45 years of marriage.

Mears' eldest son, Charles, also served briefly in the Union Army as a corporal in the same company as his father. He served a bit longer than his father, but was discharged due to disability in August 1862. After the war he was editor of the Polk County Press.

== Electoral history ==
=== Wisconsin Assembly (1872) ===
Wisconsin Assembly, Ashland–Barron–Bayfield–Burnett–Douglas–Polk District Election, 1872
| Party | Candidate | Votes | % | ±% |
|---|---|---|---|---|
General Election, November 5, 1872
| Republican | Henry D. Barron (incumbent) | 1,197 | 74.21% | −4.41 points |
| Democratic | Daniel Mears | 416 | 25.79% | |
| Plurality | | 781 | 48.42% | −8.81 points |
| Total votes | | 1,613 | 100.0% | +9.50 points |
| Republican hold | | | | |

Wisconsin Senate
| Preceded by William Wilson | Member of the Wisconsin Senate from the 28th district January 4, 1858 – January 2, 1860 | Succeeded by Charles B. Cox |
