= Aubrey, Wisconsin =

- Unincorporated community
- Location within Wisconsin Location within the United States
- Coordinates: 43°18′53″N 90°17′36″W
- Country: United States
- State: Wisconsin
- County: Richland
- Elevation: 755 ft (230 m)
- Time zone: UTC-6 (Central (CST))
  - Summer (DST): UTC-5 (CDT)
- Area code: 608
- GNIS feature ID: 1578572

Aubrey is an unincorporated community in the town of Ithaca, Richland County, Wisconsin, United States. The community was named in honor of Auburn Cass, an early settler in the area.
