= Charles B. Cox =

19th century American politician

Member of the Wisconsin State Assembly from the Pierce–St. Croix district
- In office January 5, 1863 – January 4, 1864
- Preceded by: Joseph W. Beardsley
- Succeeded by: Joseph S. Elwell

Member of the Wisconsin Senate from the 28th district
- In office January 2, 1860 – January 6, 1862
- Preceded by: Daniel Mears
- Succeeded by: Herman L. Humphrey

Personal details
- Born: June 25, 1810 Chenango County, New York, U.S.
- Died: April 27, 1891 (aged 80) Santa Rosa, California, U.S.
- Resting place: Santa Rosa Odd Fellows Cemetery, Santa Rosa, California
- Party: Republican
- Spouse: Margaret Lockard (m. 1836–1891)
- Children: William Cox^{(b. 1837)}; Arthur Lockard Cox^{(b. 1838; died 1903)}; Ellen Elizabeth (Andrews)^{(b. 1842; died 1868)}; Amelia Frances (Burnett)^{(b. 1845; died 1941)}; Mary Jane (Barnett)^{(b. 1848; died 1934)}; Walter Cox^{(b. 1856)}
- Occupation: Miller

Charles Benjamin Cox (June 25, 1810 – April 27, 1891) was an American businessman, Republican politician, and Wisconsin pioneer. He was a member of the Wisconsin Senate, representing the vast northwest quadrant of the state during the 1860 and 1861 legislative sessions. He also served one term in the Wisconsin State Assembly. His name was often abbreviated as C. B. Cox.

== Biography ==
Charles B. Cox was born in Chenango County, New York, in June 1810. He apprenticed as a miller and learned the trade, then worked for seventeen years in Ohio before moving to Wisconsin.

In 1849, he went to what is now the town of Clifton, Pierce County, Wisconsin, where he was the first American settler. He lived in a cave for his first year, but during that time built the first saw mill and first grist mill in the Kinnickinnic River valley. In 1852 he was named the first postmaster at what was then known as "Clifton Mills".

In 1854, he was persuaded to move to the neighboring village of River Falls, Wisconsin. In River Falls, Cox built another large mill, known as the Prairie Mill. He was active in milling throughout his 20 years in River Falls, and was one of the largest flour producers in the region.

In 1859, he was the Republican nominee for Wisconsin Senate in the vast 28th Senate district. At the time, this Senate district comprised nearly entire northwest quadrant of the state, from Pepin County to what is now Ashland County. In the Fall general election, he defeated Democratic candidate Alexander Maget. He went on to serve in the 1860 and 1861 legislative sessions. He did not run for re-election in 1861, but ran for Wisconsin State Assembly in 1862, winning election in the district that comprised just Pierce and St. Croix counties.

In the fall of 1875, Cox moved to Santa Rosa, California, with his wife. He remained active in public affairs in California, and ran for mayor in 1882 and municipal recorder in 1884. It does not appear he won either election.

He died in Santa Rosa on April 27, 1891.

== Personal life and family ==
Charles Cox was the second of 12 children born to Jonathan Upham Cox and his wife Lucinda (née Blood).

Charles Cox married Margaret Lockard in 1836, at Nelson Township, Portage County, Ohio. They had at least six children together. Their son Arthur served as a Union Army officer during the American Civil War. Their daughter Amelia married Ellsworth Burnett, who also served in the Wisconsin State Assembly.

Wisconsin State Assembly
Preceded by Joseph W. Beardsley	Member of the Wisconsin State Assembly from the Pierce–St. Croix district January 5, 1863 – January 4, 1864	Succeeded by Joseph S. Elwell
Wisconsin Senate
Preceded by Daniel Mears	Member of the Wisconsin Senate from the 28th district January 2, 1860 – January 6, 1862	Succeeded by Herman L. Humphrey
