= Christopher L. Taylor =

19th century American politician

Christopher Taylor

Member of the Wisconsin State Assembly from the Pierce district
- In office January 3, 1876 – January 1, 1877
- Preceded by: Thomas L. Nelson
- Succeeded by: Ellsworth Burnett

Personal details
- Born: August 26, 1828 Niagara County, New York, U.S.
- Died: May 20, 1914 (aged 85) Prescott, Wisconsin, U.S.
- Resting place: Maiden Rock Cemetery, Maiden Rock, Wisconsin
- Party: Democratic
- Spouses: Rachael E. Sharpsteen (died 1859); Adelia Doughty
- Children: Infant son^{(died 1871)}; Clarence H. Taylor^{(b. 1851; died 1853)}; Francis G. Taylor^{(b. 1852; died 1858)}; John Murray Taylor^{(b. 1874; died 1948)}; Asa Taylor^{(b. 1876; died 1880)}; Mattie A. Taylor^{(b. 1882; died 1882)}

Christopher L. Taylor (August 26, 1828 – May 20, 1914) was an American businessman, Democratic politician, and pioneer of Maiden Rock, Wisconsin. He represented Pierce County in the Wisconsin State Assembly during the 1876 session.

== Biography ==
Christopher L. Taylor was born in Niagara County, New York, in August 1828. Other positions he held include chairman of Maiden Rock, Wisconsin. He was a Democrat.

Taylor died at Prescott, Wisconsin, on May 20, 1914.
