= Clarence F. Lea =

American politician

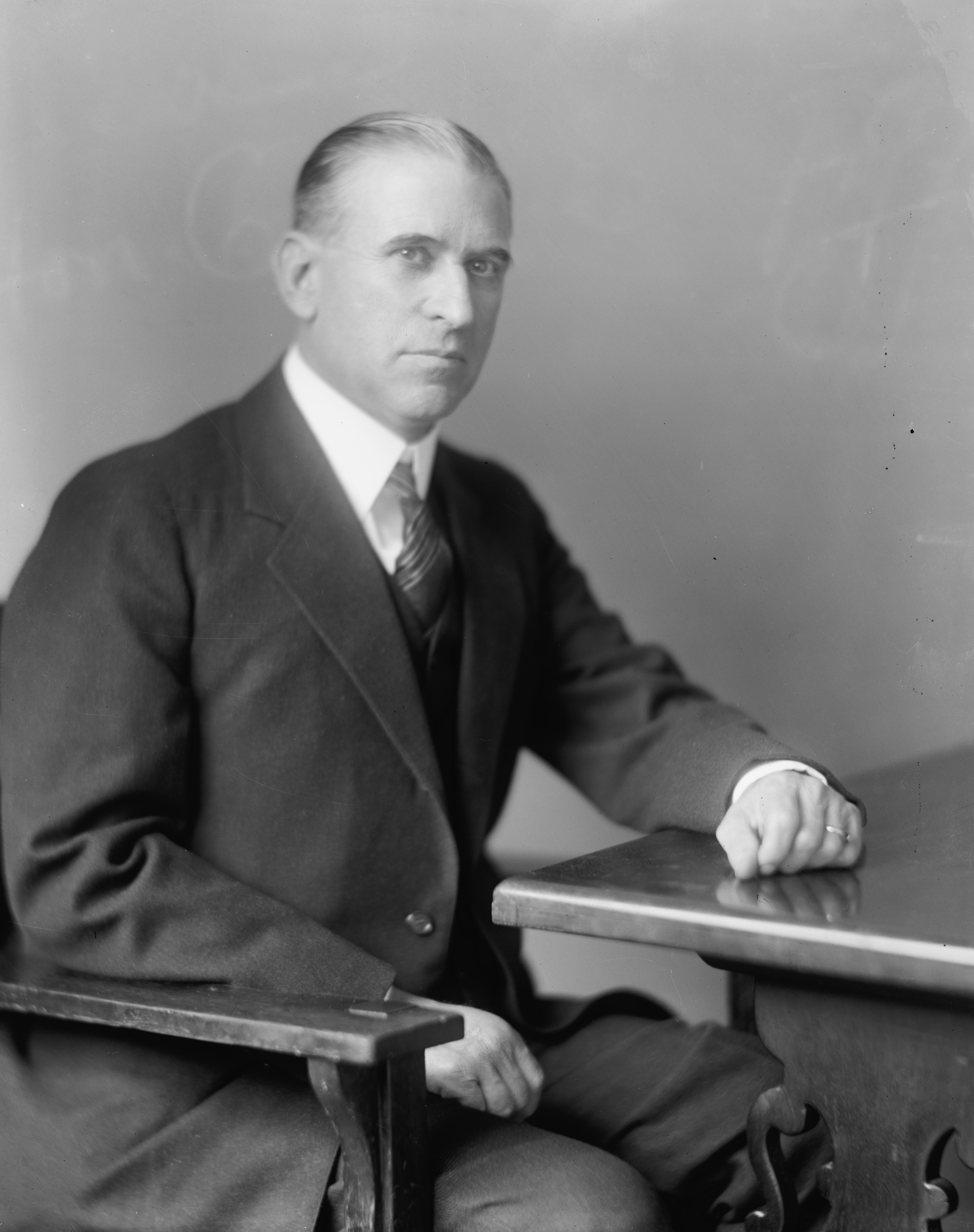
- Portrait by Harris & Ewing

Member of the U.S. House of Representatives from California's 1st district
- In office March 4, 1917 – January 3, 1949
- Preceded by: William Kent
- Succeeded by: Hubert B. Scudder

District Attorney of Sonoma County
- In office 1907–1917

Personal details
- Born: Clarence Frederick Lea; July 11, 1874 Highland Springs, California, U.S.
- Died: June 20, 1964 (aged 89) Santa Rosa, California, U.S.
- Resting place: Santa Rosa Odd Fellows Cemetery
- Party: Democratic
- Education: Lakeport Academy; Stanford University; University of Denver

Clarence Frederick Lea (July 11, 1874 – June 20, 1964) was an American lawyer and politician who served 16 terms as a U.S. representative from California from 1917 to 1949.

== Biography ==
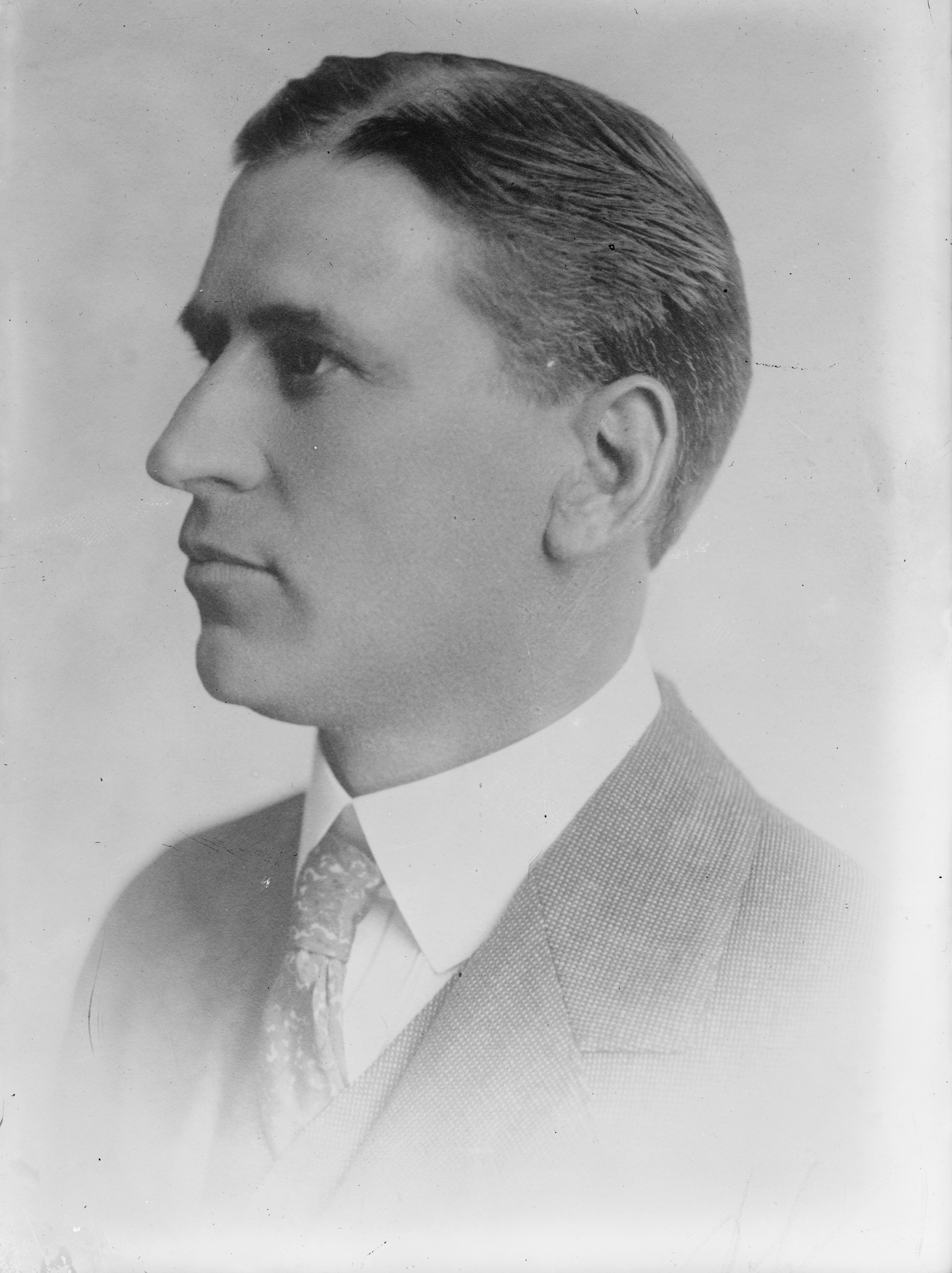
Lea in 1917

Lea was born near Highland Springs, California, in southwestern Lake County on July 11, 1874. He attended Lakeport Academy in Lakeport and Stanford University before obtaining a law degree from the University of Denver in 1898. Lea was admitted to the bar the same year and began practicing in Santa Rosa, California. He served as district attorney of Sonoma County, 1907–1917, and as president of the District Attorney's Association of California in 1916 and 1917.

=== Congress ===
He was elected as a Democrat to the 65th U.S. Congress and to the 15 succeeding Congresses (March 4, 1917 – January 3, 1949). Lea served as chairman of the Committee on Interstate and Foreign Commerce (75th through 79th Congresses). After Congress, Lea engaged in public relations work in Washington, D.C. from 1949 to 1954.

=== Death ===
Lea died in Santa Rosa, California on June 20, 1964. He is interred at the Santa Rosa Odd Fellows Cemetery.

== Legacy ==
Lea is known for having led the group of congressmen who passed the resolution calling for the internment of Italian-Americans, Japanese-Americans and German-Americans during World War II.

== Electoral history ==
Clarence Lea electoral history

1916 United States House of Representatives elections
| Party | Candidate | Votes | % |
|---|---|---|---|
| Democratic | Clarence F. Lea | 32,797 | 48.8 |
| Republican | Edward H. Hart | 28,769 | 42.8 |
| Socialist | Mary M. Morgan | 3,730 | 5.5 |
| Prohibition | Jay Scott Ryder | 1,935 | 2.9 |
| Total votes | | 67,231 | 100.0 |
| Democratic gain from Independent | | | |

1918 United States House of Representatives elections
| Party | Candidate | Votes | % |
|---|---|---|---|
| Democratic | Clarence F. Lea (Incumbent) | 42,063 | 100.0 |
| Democratic hold | | | |

1920 United States House of Representatives elections
| Party | Candidate | Votes | % |
|---|---|---|---|
| Democratic | Clarence F. Lea (Incumbent) | 34,427 | 61.7 |
| Republican | C. A. Bodwell Jr. | 18,569 | 33.3 |
| Socialist | A. K. Gifford | 2,773 | 5.0 |
| Total votes | | 55,769 | 100.0 |
| Democratic hold | | | |

1922 United States House of Representatives elections
| Party | Candidate | Votes | % |
|---|---|---|---|
| Democratic | Clarence F. Lea (Incumbent) | 53,129 | 100.0 |
| Democratic hold | | | |

1924 United States House of Representatives elections
| Party | Candidate | Votes | % |
|---|---|---|---|
| Democratic | Clarence F. Lea (Incumbent) | 47,250 | 100.0 |
| Democratic hold | | | |

1926 United States House of Representatives elections
| Party | Candidate | Votes | % |
|---|---|---|---|
| Democratic | Clarence F. Lea (Incumbent) | 60,207 | 100.0 |
| Democratic hold | | | |

1928 United States House of Representatives elections
| Party | Candidate | Votes | % |
|---|---|---|---|
| Democratic | Clarence F. Lea (Incumbent) | 56,381 | 100.0 |
| Democratic hold | | | |

1930 United States House of Representatives elections
| Party | Candidate | Votes | % |
|---|---|---|---|
| Democratic | Clarence F. Lea (Incumbent) | 66,703 | 100.0 |
| Democratic hold | | | |

1932 United States House of Representatives elections
| Party | Candidate | Votes | % |
|---|---|---|---|
| Democratic | Clarence F. Lea (Incumbent) | 73,400 | 100.0 |
| Democratic hold | | | |

1934 United States House of Representatives elections
| Party | Candidate | Votes | % |
|---|---|---|---|
| Democratic | Clarence F. Lea (Incumbent) | 98,661 | 93.6 |
| Socialist | Allen K. Gifford | 6,698 | 6.4 |
| Total votes | | 105,359 | 100.0 |
| Democratic hold | | | |

1936 United States House of Representatives elections
| Party | Candidate | Votes | % |
|---|---|---|---|
| Democratic | Clarence F. Lea (Incumbent) | 58,073 | 53.8 |
| Republican | Nelson B. Van Matre | 48,647 | 45.1 |
| Communist | Vernon Dennis Healy | 1,218 | 1.1 |
| Total votes | | 107,938 | 100.0 |
| Democratic hold | | | |

1938 United States House of Representatives elections
| Party | Candidate | Votes | % |
|---|---|---|---|
| Democratic | Clarence F. Lea (Incumbent) | 73,636 | 63 |
| Townsend | Ernest S. Mitchell | 43,320 | 37 |
| Total votes | | 116,956 | 100 |
| Democratic hold | | | |

1940 United States House of Representatives elections
| Party | Candidate | Votes | % |
|---|---|---|---|
| Democratic | Clarence F. Lea (Incumbent) | 103,547 | 93.3 |
| Communist | Albert J. Lima | 5,647 | 5.1 |
| Independent | Ernest S. Mitchell (write-in) | 1,828 | 1.6 |
| Total votes | | 111,022 | 100.0 |
| Democratic hold | | | |

1942 United States House of Representatives elections
| Party | Candidate | Votes | % |
|---|---|---|---|
| Democratic | Clarence F. Lea (Incumbent) | 78,281 | 93.2 |
| Communist | Albert J. Lima | 5,703 | 6.8 |
| Total votes | | 83,984 | 100.0 |
| Democratic hold | | | |

1944 United States House of Representatives elections
| Party | Candidate | Votes | % |
|---|---|---|---|
| Democratic | Clarence F. Lea (Incumbent) | 92,706 | 100.0 |
| Democratic hold | | | |

1946 United States House of Representatives elections
| Party | Candidate | Votes | % |
|---|---|---|---|
| Democratic | Clarence F. Lea (Incumbent) | 77,653 | 100.0 |
| Democratic hold | | | |

U.S. House of Representatives
| Preceded by William Kent | Member of the U.S. House of Representatives from California's 1st congressional district 1917–1949 | Succeeded by Hubert B. Scudder |
