= Ellsworth Burnett =

19th century American politician

Member of the Wisconsin State Assembly from the Pierce County district
- In office January 1877 – January 1878
- Preceded by: Christopher L. Taylor
- Succeeded by: Charles A. Hawn

Personal details
- Born: August 5, 1836 Madrid, New York, U.S.
- Died: April 14, 1895 (aged 58) Santa Rosa, California, U.S.
- Resting place: Santa Rosa Odd Fellows Cemetery, Santa Rosa, California
- Party: Republican
- Spouse: Amelia Frances Cox (m. 1873)

Military service
- Allegiance: United States
- Branch/service: United States Volunteers; Union Army
- Years of service: 1862–1865
- Rank: Captain, USV; Brevet Major, USV
- Unit: 30th Reg. Wis. Vol. Infantry; 37th Reg. Wis. Vol. Infantry
- Battles/wars: American Civil War

Ellsworth Burnett (August 5, 1836 – April 14, 1895) was an American politician and Wisconsin pioneer. He served one term in the Wisconsin State Assembly, representing Pierce County in the 1877 session.

== Early life ==
Burnett was born in Madrid, New York, though reports differ on the exact date. He later moved to River Falls, Wisconsin.

== Career ==
After moving to Wisconsin, Burnett became involved in the lumber and farming industries. During the American Civil War, Burnett originally enlisted with the 30th Wisconsin Infantry Regiment of the Union Army, where he became a sergeant. Later, he joined the 37th Wisconsin Infantry Regiment and was attached to the Army of the Potomac. He achieved the rank of captain and was brevetted a major for his performance during the siege of Petersburg.

Burnett was a member of the Assembly during the 1877 session. Previously, he had been sheriff of Pierce County, Wisconsin, from January 1, 1872, until January 1, 1873. He was a Republican.

== Personal life ==
On November 24, 1873, Burnett married Amelia Frances Cox. Amelia Cox was the daughter of Charles B. Cox, another prominent pioneer settler of Pierce County, who also served in the Wisconsin Legislature.

Ellsworth Burnett died in Santa Rosa, California, on April 14, 1895.
