= Edward Ackley =

American politician

Edward Flanders "Pete" Ackley (July 21, 1887 – October 2, 1964) was an American lawyer, politician, and college football and college baseball coach. He served in the Wisconsin State Senate from 1913 to 1916.

== Early life and education ==
Ackley was born on July 21, 1887, in Chippewa Falls, Wisconsin. He graduated from Chippewa Falls High School before attending the University of Minnesota Law School. He married Clara M. Christenson around 1912.

== Career ==
Ackley represented the 28th district in the Senate from 1913 to 1916. He was a Republican, a defeated William H. Frawley in November 1912 election.

In September 1926, Ackley was hired as the head football coach at Whitworth University in Spokane, Washington. He also coached baseball at Whitworth in the spring of 1927.

Around 1929, Ackley moved to Oregon to practice law. He served as the city attorney for Brookings, Oregon, from 1953 to 1956. Oregon governor Elmo Smith appointed Ackley as district attorney of Curry County, Oregon, in July 1956.

== Death ==
Ackley died on October 2, 1964, while visiting relative in Santa Cruz, California.
