= Buena Vista, Richland County, Wisconsin =

Buena Vista, Wisconsin
- Town
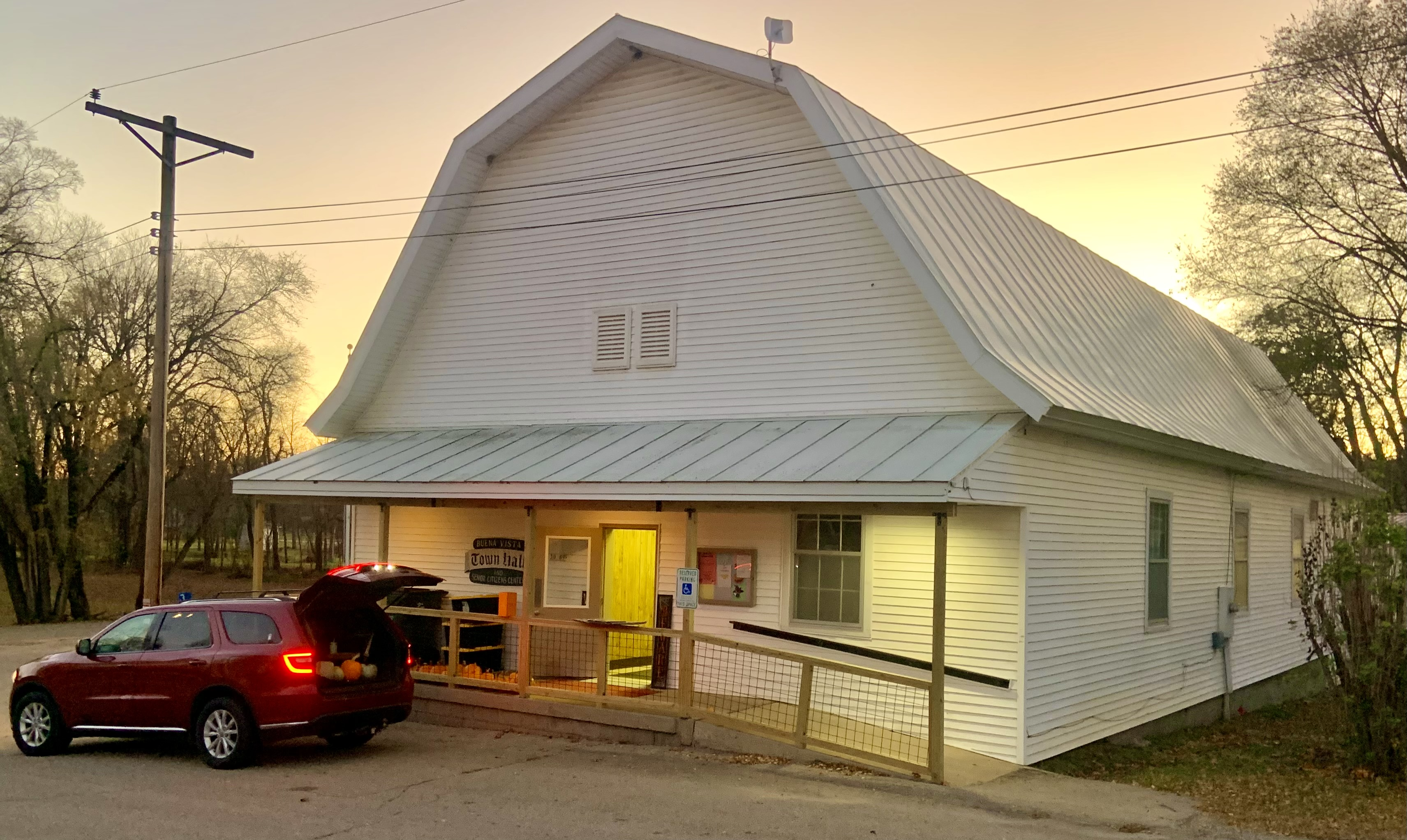
- Town hall in Gotham

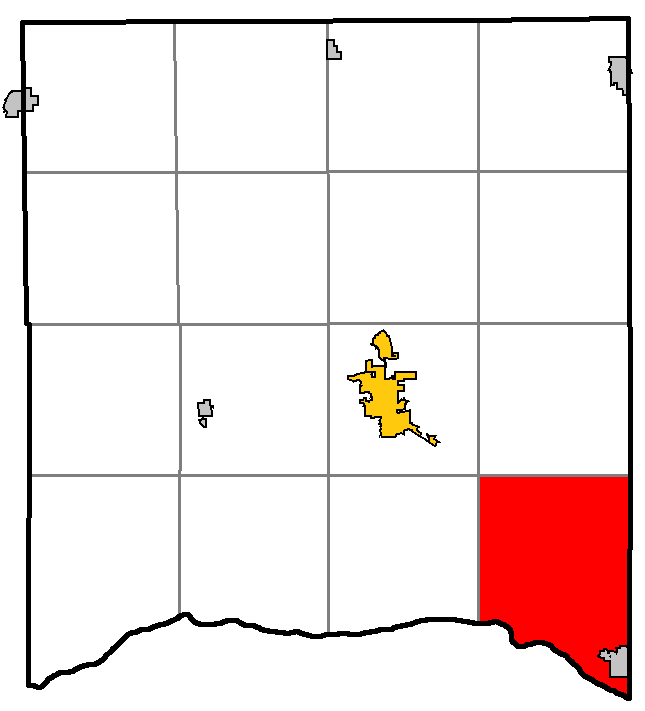
- Location of Buena Vista, Richland County, Wisconsin

- Location of Richland County, Wisconsin
- Coordinates: 43°15′14″N 90°15′59″W
- Country: United States
- State: Wisconsin
- County: Richland

Area
  - Total: 42.0 sq mi (108.8 km^{2})
  - Land: 41.1 sq mi (106.4 km^{2})
  - Water: 0.97 sq mi (2.5 km^{2})
- Elevation: 807 ft (246 m)

Population (2020)
  - Total: 1,807
  - Density: 43.99/sq mi (16.98/km^{2})
- Time zone: UTC-6 (Central (CST))
  - Summer (DST): UTC-5 (CDT)
- Area code: 608
- FIPS code: 55-10950
- GNIS feature ID: 1582883

Buena Vista is a town in Richland County, Wisconsin, United States. The population was 1,807 at the 2020 census. The unincorporated communities of Gotham, and Sextonville are located within the town.

== Geography ==
According to the United States Census Bureau, the town has a total area of 42.0 square miles (108.8 km^{2}), of which 41.1 square miles (106.3 km^{2}) is land and 0.9 square mile (2.5 km^{2}) (2.26%) is water.

== Demographics ==
As of the census of 2000, there were 1,575 people, 600 households, and 438 families residing in the town. The population density was 38.4 people per square mile (14.8/km^{2}). There were 654 housing units at an average density of 15.9 per square mile (6.1/km^{2}). The racial makeup of the town was 97.90% White, 0.25% African American, 0.32% Native American, 0.32% Asian, 0.38% from other races, and 0.83% from two or more races. Hispanic or Latino of any race were 1.02% of the population.

There were 600 households, out of which 33.3% had children under the age of 18 living with them, 62.8% were married couples living together, 5.5% had a female householder with no husband present, and 27.0% were non-families. 22.0% of all households were made up of individuals, and 9.0% had someone living alone who was 65 years of age or older. The average household size was 2.63 and the average family size was 3.07.

In the town, the population was spread out, with 26.9% under the age of 18, 8.2% from 18 to 24, 28.7% from 25 to 44, 25.3% from 45 to 64, and 10.9% who were 65 years of age or older. The median age was 36 years. For every 100 females, there were 107.8 males. For every 100 females age 18 and over, there were 106.3 males.

The median income for a household in the town was $40,000, and the median income for a family was $45,500. Males had a median income of $29,076 versus $21,484 for females. The per capita income for the town was $17,411. About 4.8% of families and 6.2% of the population were below the poverty line, including 8.9% of those under age 18 and 2.9% of those age 65 or over.

== Notable people ==
- William Dixon, Wisconsin State Representative
- Harley A. Martin, Wisconsin State Representative
