= Senator Lang =

Senator Lang may refer to:

- Andrew Lang (Minnesota politician) (born 1979), Minnesota State Senate
- George Lang (Ohio politician) (born 1962), Ohio State Senate
- Mike Lang (Montana politician) (born 1949), Montana State Senate
- Timothy P. Lang (fl. 1985–present), New Hampshire State Senate

== See also ==
- Senator Lange (disambiguation)
