= Herman Lange =

American politician

Herman Theodore Lange (April 9, 1858 – June 3, 1938) was a member of the Wisconsin State Senate.

== Biography ==
Lange was born on April 9, 1858, in Portage, Wisconsin. He was active in the grocery and canning businesses. He died of a heart attack on June 3, 1938.

== Political career ==
Lange represented the 28th district of the Senate from 1921 to 1928. In addition, Lange was an Eau Claire, Wisconsin, alderman. He was a Republican.
