= Philip Calvert Spensley =

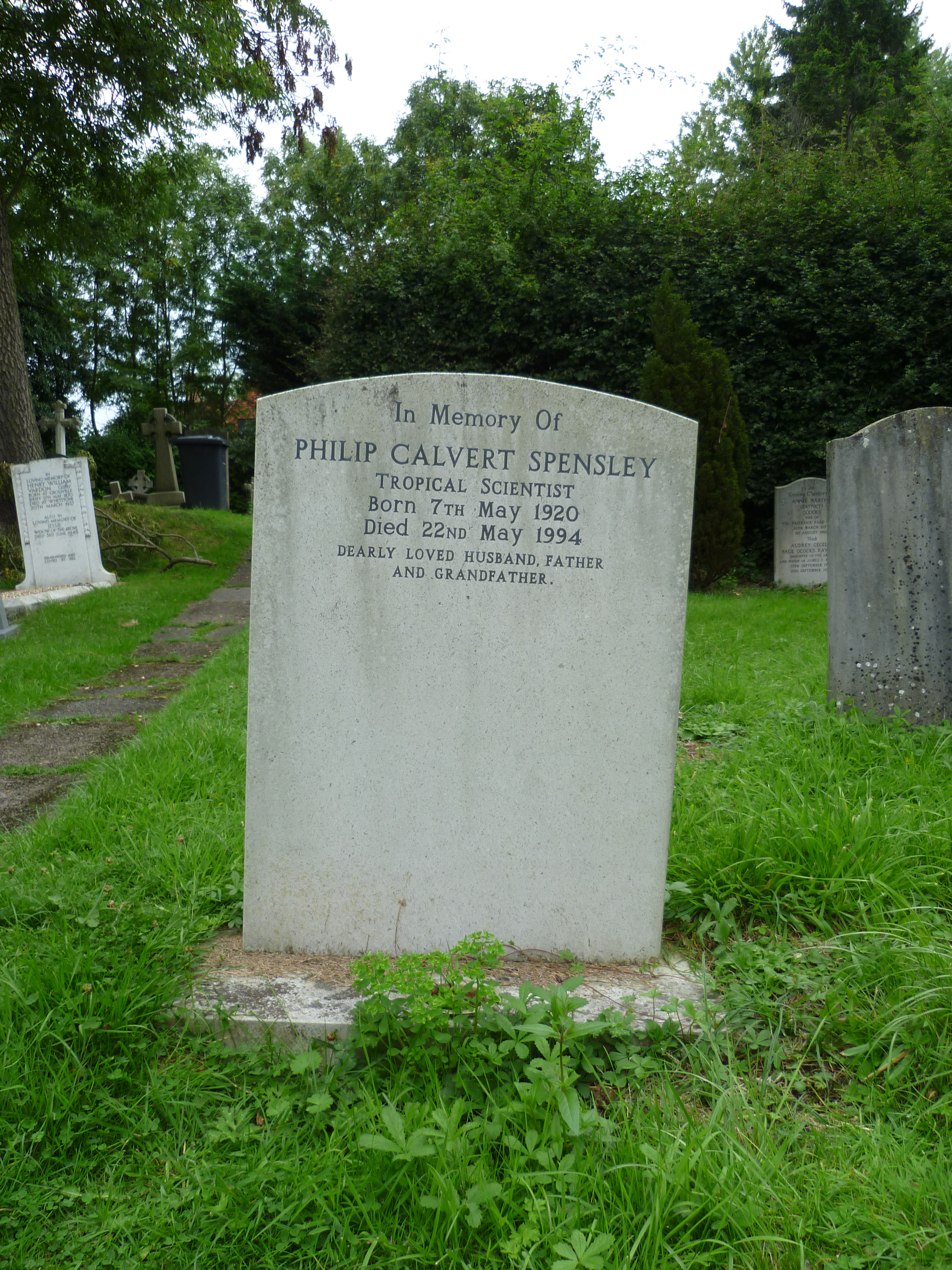
Philip Calvert Spensley grave at St Andrew's church, Totteridge.

Philip Calvert Spensley (7 May 1920 – 22 May 1994) was a British tropical scientist who was director of the Tropical Products Institute, in Chatham, Kent, from 1966 to 1981.

He is buried at St Andrew's church, Totteridge, London.
