= William Wilson (Wisconsin politician) =

American politician (1807–1892)

Captain William Wilson
- Born: February 9, 1807; Lycoming County, Pennsylvania, U.S.
- Died: September 4, 1892 (aged 85); Menomonie, Dunn County, Wisconsin, U.S.
- Known for: Founding Partner of The Knapp, Stout & Co. Founder and First Mayor of Menomonie, Wisconsin Member of Wisconsin State Senate
- Political party: Republican Party
- Relatives: James Huff Stout (son-in-law)

William Wilson (February 9, 1807 – September 4, 1892) was a member of the Wisconsin State Senate in 1857. He was also a delegate to the 1876 Republican National Convention.
