= Bear Valley, Wisconsin =

- Unincorporated community
- Location within Wisconsin Location within the United States
- Coordinates: 43°18′29″N 90°11′42″W
- Country: United States
- State: Wisconsin
- County: Richland
- Elevation: 761 ft (232 m)
- Time zone: UTC-6 (Central (CST))
  - Summer (DST): UTC-5 (CDT)
- Area code: 608
- GNIS feature ID: 1561398

Bear Valley is an unincorporated community in the town of Ithaca, Richland County, Wisconsin, United States. Circa 1855, Peter W. Haskins of New York began to lay out lots and planned the village of Petersburg, which was later named Bear Valley. A post office was established in 1858. Bear Valley was named for two nearby geographic features: Bear Creek and a nineteen mile long valley.
