= Robert Joiner =

American politician

Robert Lucas Joiner (November 6, 1841 – May 5, 1920) was a member of the Wisconsin State Senate.

A native of Williamsport, Indiana. Joiner moved to Wyoming, Iowa County, Wisconsin in 1845. He was a farmer and surveyor. His father, Lemuel, was also a member of the Senate, as well as the Wisconsin State Assembly. Joiner died in Dodgeville, Wisconsin.

== Career ==
Joiner was a member of the Senate from 1888 to 1892. He was a Republican.
