= Calvert Spensley =

American politician

Calvert F. Spensley (January 2, 1846 – January 17, 1924) was a member of the Wisconsin State Senate.

== Biography ==
Spensley was born on January 2, 1846, in Stockton-on-Tees, England, where his father worked as the world's first rail station agent. He moved to Shullsburg, Wisconsin in 1849 and to Mineral Point, Wisconsin in 1857. Later, he attended the Eastman Business College and Columbia Law School. During the American Civil War, Spensley served in the Union Army as a sergeant.

On October 13, 1869, Spensley married Clara J. Cobb. They had three children. Spensley died on January 17, 1924.

== Political career ==
Spensley was a member of the Senate representing the 28th district from 1893 to 1896. Previously, he was Mayor of Mineral Point from 1877 to 1878 and Chairman of the Iowa County, Wisconsin Board of Supervisors from 1875 to 1876. He was a Republican.
