= Ithaca, Wisconsin =

- Town
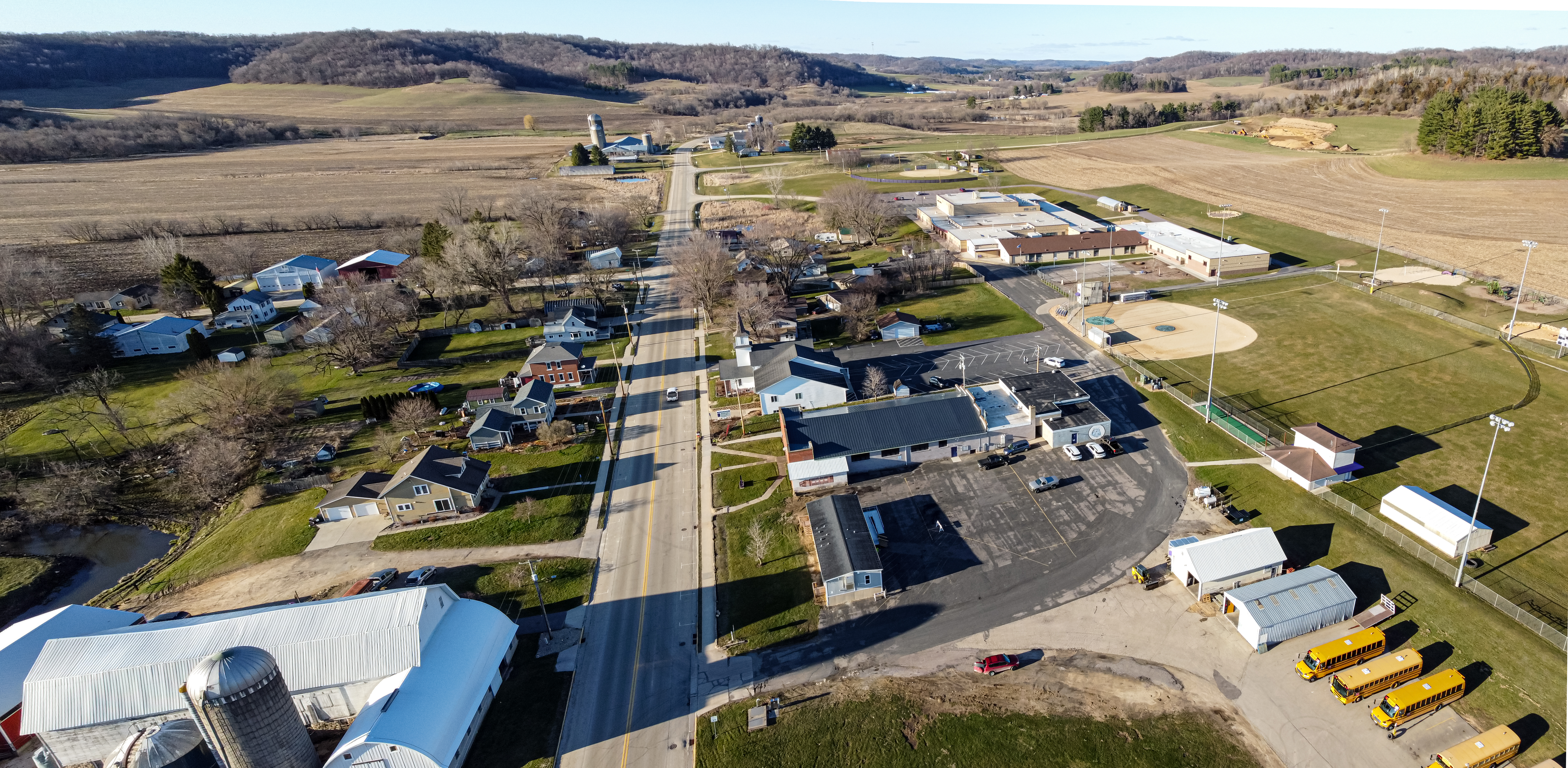
- Wis-58 runs through town

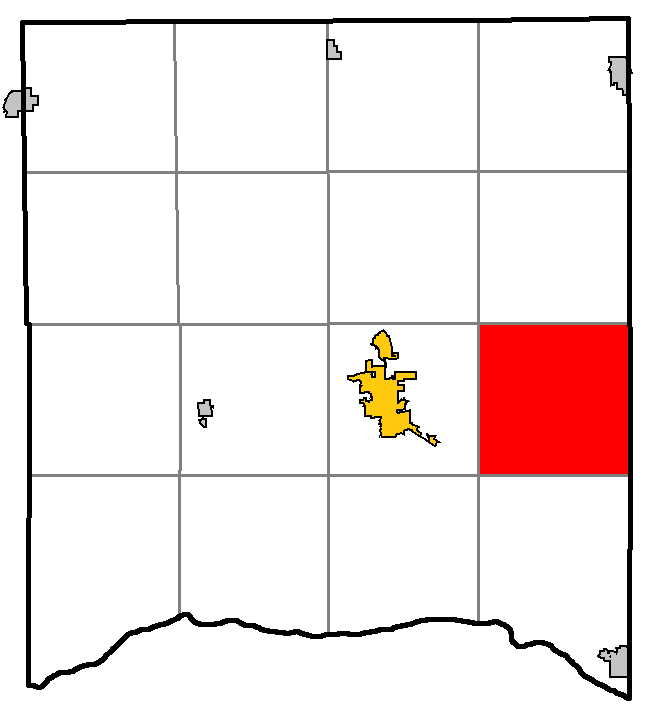
- Location of Ithaca, Wisconsin

- Location of Richland County, Wisconsin
- Coordinates: 43°19′41″N 90°15′23″W
- Country: United States
- State: Wisconsin
- County: Richland

Area
  - Total: 36.0 sq mi (93.3 km^{2})
  - Land: 36.0 sq mi (93.3 km^{2})
  - Water: 0 sq mi (0.0 km^{2})
- Elevation: 784 ft (239 m)

Population (2020)
  - Total: 633
  - Density: 17.6/sq mi (6.78/km^{2})
- Time zone: UTC-6 (Central (CST))
  - Summer (DST): UTC-5 (CDT)
- Area code: 608
- FIPS code: 55-37500
- GNIS feature ID: 1583439

Ithaca is a town in Richland County, Wisconsin, United States. The population was 633 at the 2020 census. The unincorporated communities of Aubrey, Bear Valley, Ithaca, Keyesville, and Neptune are located in the town.

== Geography ==
According to the United States Census Bureau, the town has a total area of 36.0 square miles (93.3 km^{2}), all land.

== Demographics ==
As of the census of 2000, there were 648 people, 249 households, and 187 families residing in the town. The population density was 18.0 people per square mile (6.9/km^{2}). There were 275 housing units at an average density of 7.6 per square mile (2.9/km^{2}). The racial makeup of the town was 98.61% White, 0.15% African American, 0.62% Asian, and 0.62% from two or more races.

There were 249 households, out of which 31.7% had children under the age of 18 living with them, 67.5% were married couples living together, 4.4% had a female householder with no husband present, and 24.5% were non-families. 20.5% of all households were made up of individuals, and 8.4% had someone living alone who was 65 years of age or older. The average household size was 2.60 and the average family size was 3.02.

In the town, the population was spread out, with 25.2% under the age of 18, 9.0% from 18 to 24, 25.6% from 25 to 44, 23.3% from 45 to 64, and 17.0% who were 65 years of age or older. The median age was 39 years. For every 100 females, there were 105.1 males. For every 100 females age 18 and over, there were 105.5 males.

The median income for a household in the town was $42,222, and the median income for a family was $49,583. Males had a median income of $29,500 versus $20,667 for females. The per capita income for the town was $17,358. About 4.0% of families and 5.2% of the population were below the poverty line, including 9.1% of those under age 18 and 4.9% of those age 65 or over.

== Community ==
Ithaca is also home of Ithaca High School, a grade school (with junior high attending Ithaca High School), and Willow Valley United Methodist Church. The town also holds an annual fair on Saturday in late September/early October featuring a dairy cow show, judging other animals including sheep and pigs, crafts show and the highlight is the parade on state Highway 58, the Homecoming game for the Ithaca Bulldogs and Homecoming dance that Saturday night.

== See also ==
- List of towns in Wisconsin
