= Sextonville, Wisconsin =

Census-designated place in Wisconsin, United States

- Census-designated place
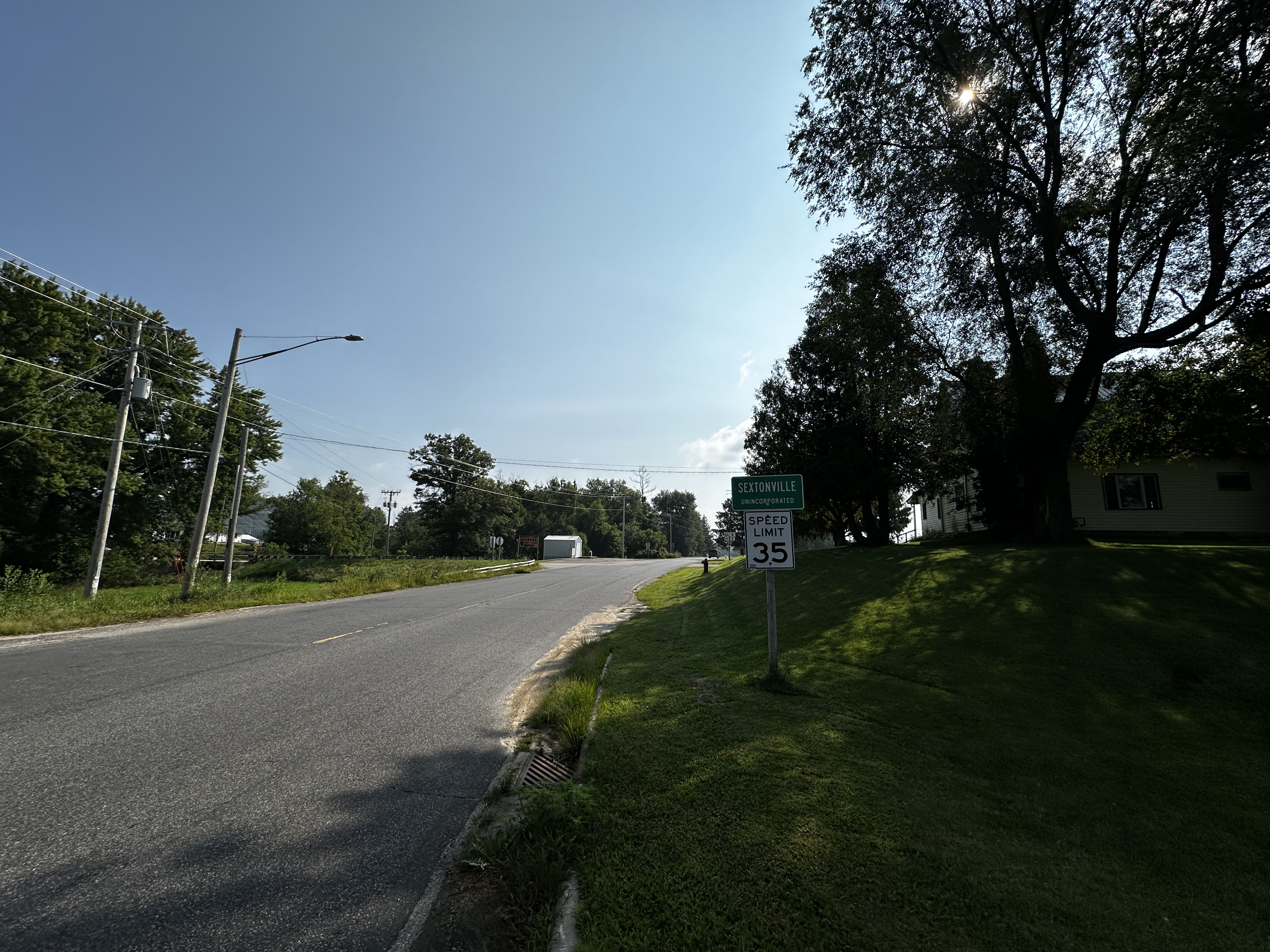
- Sextonville pictured in August 2024

- Location within Wisconsin
- Coordinates: 43°16′42″N 90°17′27″W
- Country: United States
- State: Wisconsin
- County: Richland

Area
  - Total: 0.876 sq mi (2.27 km^{2})
  - Land: 0.876 sq mi (2.27 km^{2})
  - Water: 0 sq mi (0 km^{2})
- Elevation: 728 ft (222 m)

Population (2020)
  - Total: 476
  - Density: 543/sq mi (210/km^{2})
- Time zone: UTC-6 (Central (CST))
  - Summer (DST): UTC-5 (CDT)
- ZIP code: 53584
- Area code: 608
- GNIS feature ID: 1578620

Sextonville is an unincorporated census-designated place located in the town of Buena Vista in Richland County, Wisconsin, United States. Sextonville is located on U.S. Route 14, southeast of Richland Center. Sextonville has a post office with ZIP code 53584. As of the 2020 census, its population was 476.

== Demographics ==
It is estimated that Sextonville had 422 residents in the year 2021, ranking it as the 566th most populous city in Wisconsin out of 806 communities. Whites are the only racial/ethnic group (100.0%).

Historical population
| Census | Pop. | Note | %± |
|---|---|---|---|
| 2010 | 551 | | — |
| 2020 | 476 | | −13.6% |
U.S. Decennial Census
