= Joseph McGrew =

American politician

Joseph Blackburn McGrew (28 January 1829 – 30 December 1897) was a member of the Wisconsin State Assembly and the Wisconsin State Senate.

== Biography ==
McGrew was born in Wayne Township, Jefferson County, Ohio. He moved to Richland County, Wisconsin in 1855.

== Career ==
McGrew was a member of the Assembly in 1875 and of the Senate from 1880 to 1881. Previously, he was Chairman of the Richland, Richland County, Wisconsin Board and the Richland County Board. Additionally, McGrew was Sheriff of Richland County in 1863. He was a Republican.
