= Erastus B. Wolcott (statue) =

Statue by Francis Herman Packer

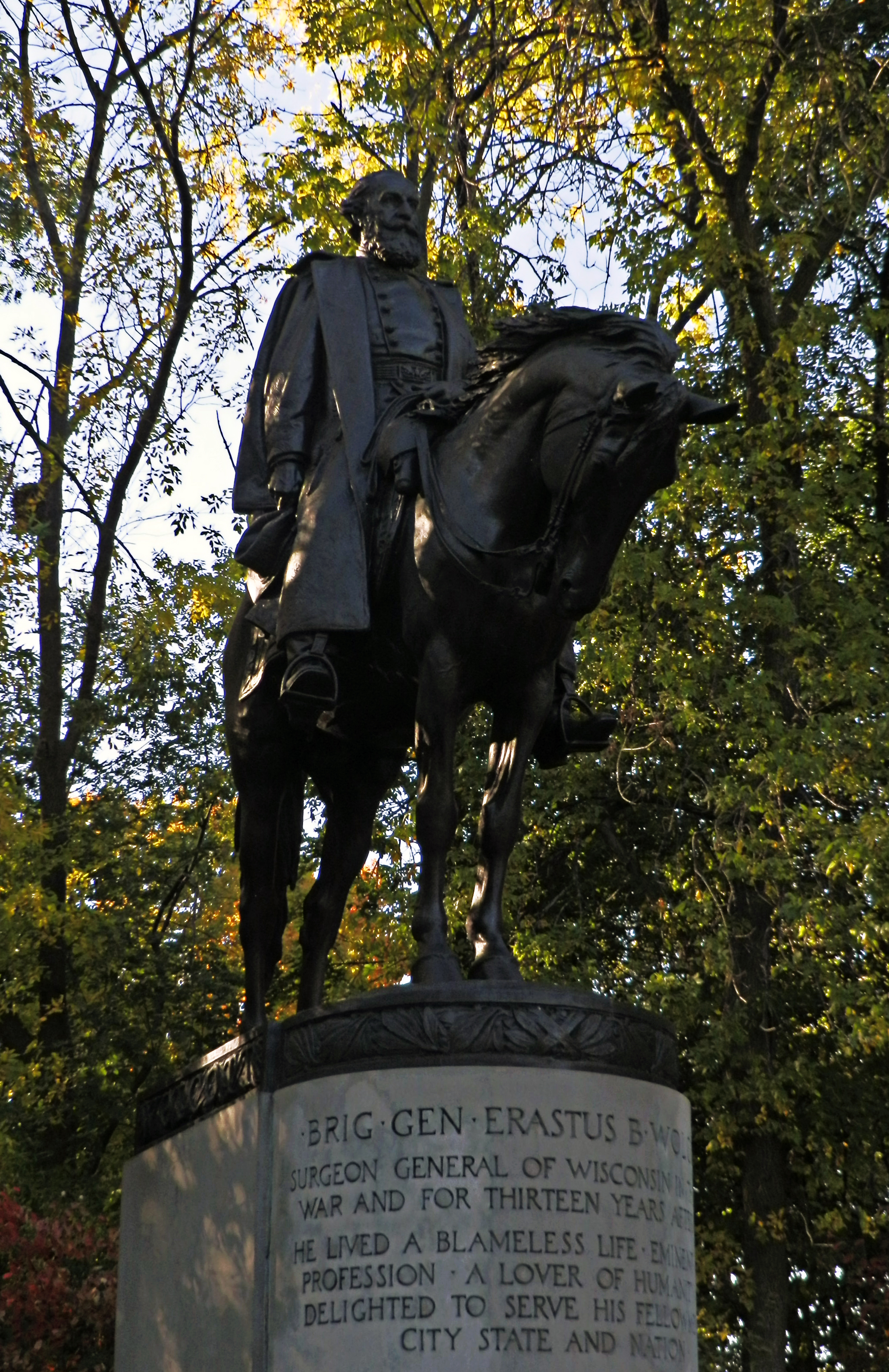
- Artist: Francis Herman Packer
- Year: 1920
- Type: bronze
- Dimensions: 470 cm (184 in)
- Location: Lake Park, Milwaukee, Wisconsin; 43°3′59.152″N 87°52′13.778″W
- Owner: Milwaukee County Parks

Erastus B. Wolcott is a public art work by American artist Francis Herman Packer, located in Lake Park on the east side of Milwaukee, Wisconsin. The bronze equestrian commemorates military officer and physician Erastus B. Wolcott. It is located in the center of Lake Park, near Eight Stone Lions and the North Point Lighthouse.

It is said that his wife wrote the epitaph. The inscription reads:

Brig. Gen. Erastus B. Wolcott

Surgeon General of Wisconsin in the Civil War and for thirteen years afterward.
He lived a blameless life. Eminent in his profession. A lover of humanity. Who delighted to serve his fellowmen, his city state and nation.

Fraternity - Charity - Equality - Devotion to Country
