= Bust of Christian Wahl =

Artwork by Gaetano Trentanove

- Artist: Gaetano Trentanove
- Year: 1903
- Type: bronze
- Dimensions: 240 cm (96 in)
- Location: N. Wahl Ave. near E. Belleview Pl., Milwaukee; 43°03′49″N 87°52′24″W

Christian Wahl is a public artwork by Italian artist Gaetano Trentanove located in Lake Park, which is in Milwaukee, Wisconsin, United States. The bronze bust of Milwaukee businessman Christian Wahl was created in 1903, and is set atop a red granite pedestal. Altogether it measures 8 feet in height.

== Description ==
The bronze bust of Christian Wahl depicts a kindly balding older gentleman sporting a beard and mustache, and wearing an overcoat, suit and tie. The sculpture sits on a red granite base with an inscription on the back stating: "He gave / his ripest years and study / to the parks / rewarded alive / by / grateful remembrance". This inscription is signed. There is an inscription on the front of the base that states: "In memory of Christian Wahl / born February 12, 1829 / died October 19, 1901". In 2023, the bust was relocated from Wahl Park, on the city’s north side, to Lake Park, adjacent to Wahl Avenue. It is administered by the Milwaukee County Department of Parks, Recreation and Culture.

Short video of sculpture.

== Historical information ==
Christian Wahl was a wealthy businessman often referred to as the father of Milwaukee's public parks because he led most of the planning of the county's park system. Wahl was born in Bavaria in 1829 and moved with his family to a farm 5 miles south of Milwaukee in 1848. After traveling extensively, he settled in Chicago where he joined his brother in the glue business. Wahl served on Chicago's city council and board of education. Upon retiring, he moved back to Milwaukee, purchasing a home on Prospect Avenue. Wahl's home soon became the center of Milwaukee's German-American society, as he often hosted musical and literary events. "During the last years of his life, as a wealthy, retired businessman, Wahl was president of the first City Park Board in the board's first decade. His strong leadership was instrumental in the development of the city's park system and he took a deep personal interest in the completion of Lake Park." When Wahl died in 1901, Der Herald, Milwaukee's German-language newspaper, stated that his altruistic labor deserved a monument, and the city's citizens agreed.

The sculpture was originally placed in the outside court between two porticoes of the Lake Park Pavilion building. The dedication ceremonies, planned to coincide with the opening of the pavilion, took place on July 11, 1903. "Judge George H. Noyes made the presentation speech, the bust remaining with the American flag. As Judge Noyes ceased speaking Clauder's Military Band struck up "The Star-Spangled Banner", while Cyril Gordon Weld, the grandson of Mr. Wahl, cut the cord that held the national colors about the bust, and the flag full, disclosing the features of Christian Wahl." The dedication ended with Wahl's widow presenting a collection of large palm trees, assembled by the late Wahl, to the park board.

=== Location history ===
Christian Wahl was originally placed outside the Lake Park Pavilion. By 1923 the sculpture had been moved to a site adjacent to the North Point Lighthouse, also in Lake Park. In 1960 it was relocated to Wahl Park, a park named in Christian Wahl's honor that had opened in 1956. After the Milwaukee County Board voted in September 2020 to rename Wahl Park for abolitionist Harriet Tubman, the nonprofit Lake Park Friends group raised funds to restore the bust and return it to Lake Park. In August 2023 it was reinstalled in Lake Park, near the intersection of N. Wahl Avenue and E. Belleview Place.
