= Corps Saxo-Borussia Heidelberg =

German student corps

Coordinates: 49°24′30″N 8°42′5″E

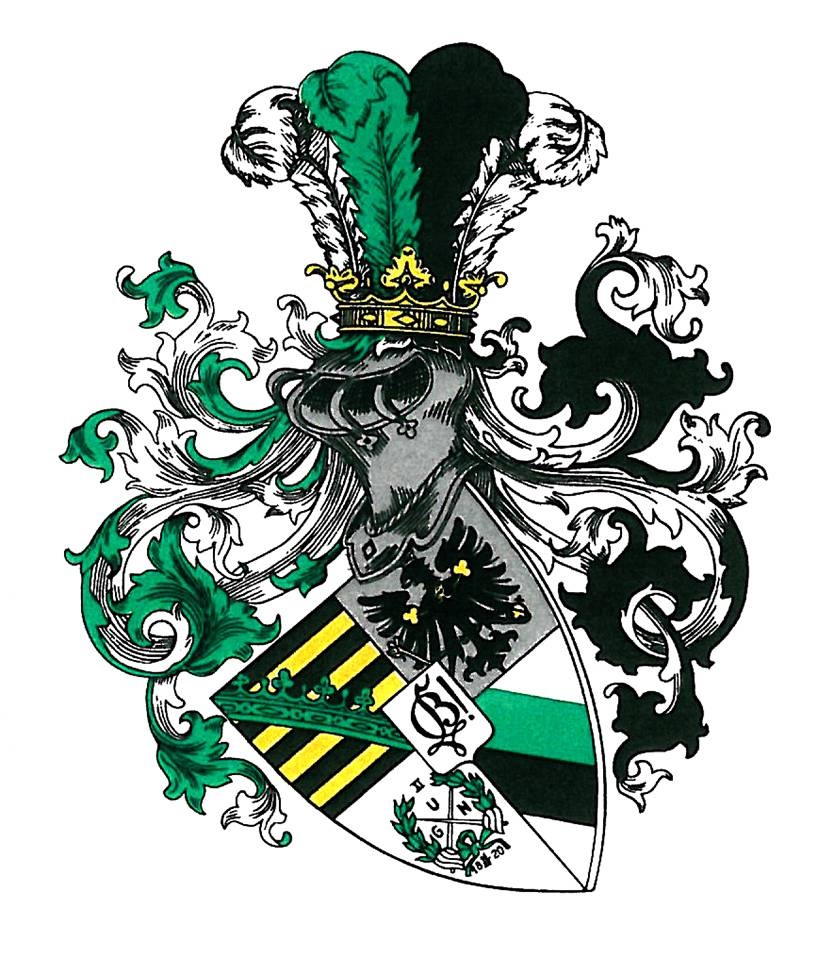
- Founded: 16 December 1820; 205 years ago Ruprecht-Karls-University
- Type: Studentenverbindung
- Affiliation: KSCV
- Status: Active
- Emphasis: Dueling
- Scope: Local
- Motto: Virtus sola bonorum corona!
- Colors: White, Green, Black, and White
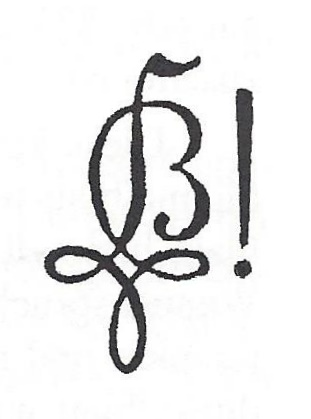
- Zirkel
- Chapters: 1
- Headquarters: Riesenstein; 69117 Heidelberg; Germany

The Corps Saxo-Borussia Heidelberg is a German Student Corps at the University of Heidelberg.

== History ==
Saxo-Borussia was established on 16 December 1820. In 1829 Robert Schumann became a lifelong member. During the Revolutions of 1848 in the German states the corps participated in founding the Kösener Senioren-Convents-Verband (KSCV), an association of German-speaking Student Corps.

In the German Empire and in the Weimar Republic Saxo-Borussia was considered "the most distinguished corps of Christendom" – a reference to the 1st Foot Guards (German Empire). Wilhelm Meyer-Förster wrote a student novel (1885) and Mark Twain reported on his visit in A Tramp Abroad. Kurt Tucholsky taunted the corps with a poem.

The group was prosecuted in Nazi Germany. It dissolved on 3 July 1935 under persecution, and was recreated in 1952. In 1910 and 1998 it headed the KSCV.

== Symbols ==
Saxo-Borussia's motto is Virtus sola bonorum corona!. Its colors are white, green, black and white. The corps also has a zirkel.

== Notable members ==
=== Princes ===
- Frederick II, Grand Duke of Baden
- Prince Maximilian of Baden
- Constantine I of Greece
- Prince Oskar of Prussia
- Charles Augustus, Hereditary Grand Duke of Saxe-Weimar-Eisenach (1844–1894)
- Ernst I, Duke of Saxe-Altenburg
- Otto of Stolberg-Wernigerode

=== Others ===
- Herbert von Dirksen, ambassador to Britain
- Albrecht von Hagen, executed in 1944
- Hermann Theodor Hettner, literary historian
- William Hillebrand, physician and botanist in Hawaii
- Leopold von Hoesch, esteemed diplomat in England
- Joseph Florimond Loubat, bibliophile, antiquarian, sportsman, and philanthropist
- Eduard von Rindfleisch, pathologist
- Hans Joachim von Rohr, agrarian
- Rudolf von Scheliha, executed in 1942
- Gustav Simon, surgeon

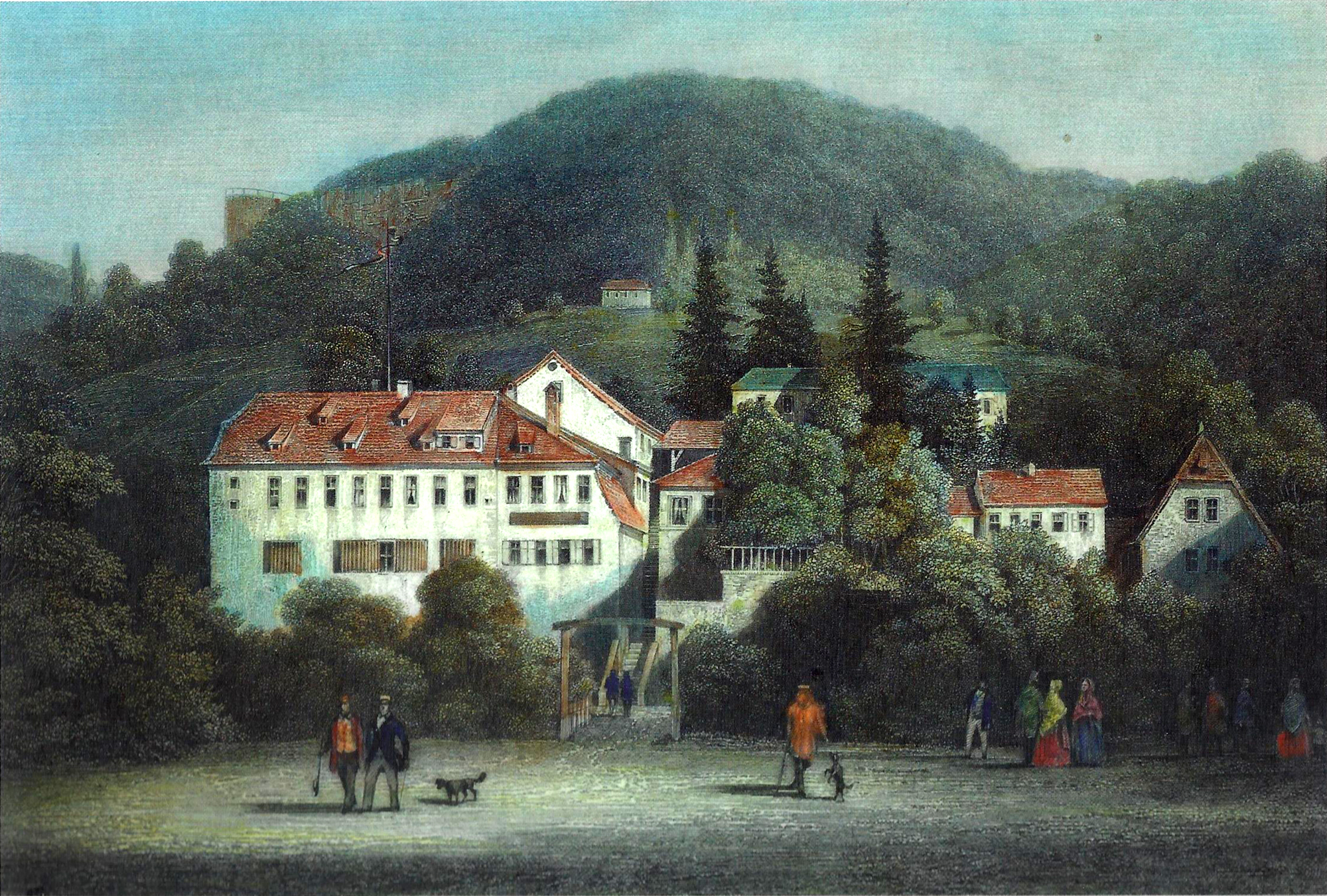
Corpshouse Riesenstein (1850)

== Riesenstein ==
Saxo-Borussia is also known for her Corpshouse called Riesenstein. It is located nearby the Gaisberg (Heidelberg).

== See also ==
- Junker (Prussia)
- List of members of German student corps
- The Student Prince
