= Gustav Simon (surgeon) =

German surgeon (1824–1876)

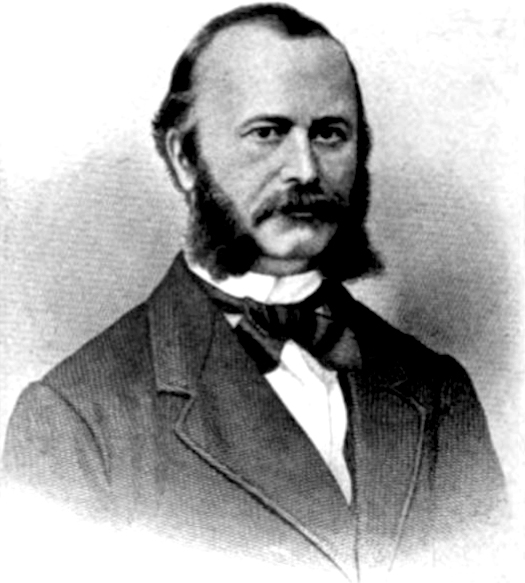
Gustav Simon (1824–1876)

Gustav Simon (30 May 1824 in Darmstadt – 21 August 1876 in Heidelberg) was a German surgeon.

In 1848 he earned his medical doctorate from the University of Giessen, and from 1848 to 1861 served as a military physician with a Hessian troop outfit. During this time he also worked at a small hospital in Darmstadt that he co-founded. In 1861 at the request of Carl Friedrich Strempel (1800–1872), he was appointed professor at the University of Rostock and director of the surgical clinic. In 1867 he succeeded Karl Otto Weber (1827–1867) at the University of Heidelberg. During the Franco-Prussian War he served as a physician in reserve hospitals. Simon was a member of the Corps Starkenburgia Giessen (1843) and Saxo-Borussia Heidelberg (1845).

Simon specialized in the fields of gynecology, orthopedics and military surgery, and published a book involving his early experiences with gunshot wounds. In 1851-52 while in Paris, he had the chance to observe Antoine Joseph Jobert de Lamballe’s operative treatment of vesicovaginal fistulae (VVF). Impressed by Jobert's success rate with VVF, Simon developed his own surgical technique for VVF when he returned to Darmstadt.

Simon demonstrated that the excretion process remains functional in animals with one healthy kidney, and on 2 August 1869 performed the first planned nephrectomy on a human, only eight years after the first nephrectomy by Erastus Bradley Wolcott.

In 1872 with Bernhard von Langenbeck (1810-1887) and Richard von Volkmann (1830-1889), he founded the German Society of Surgery.

== Literary works ==
- 1851, "Über Schußwunden" (About gunshot wounds), Gießen.
- 1854, "Über Heilung der Blasenscheidenfisteln" (Concerning healing of vesicovaginal fistulae), Gießen.
- 1857, "Die Exstirpation der Milz" (The extirpation of the spleen, Gießen.
- 1862, "Über die Operation der Blasenscheidenfisteln" (About the operation for vesicovaginal fistulae), Rostock.
- 1868, "Mitteilungen aus der chirurgischen Klinik zu Rostock" (Reports from the surgical hospital at Rostock), Prag.
- 1871-76 "Chirurgie der Nieren" (Surgery of the kidneys); (2 volumes), Stuttgart.
