= Richard R. Pieper =

American entrepreneur and philanthropist (born 1936)

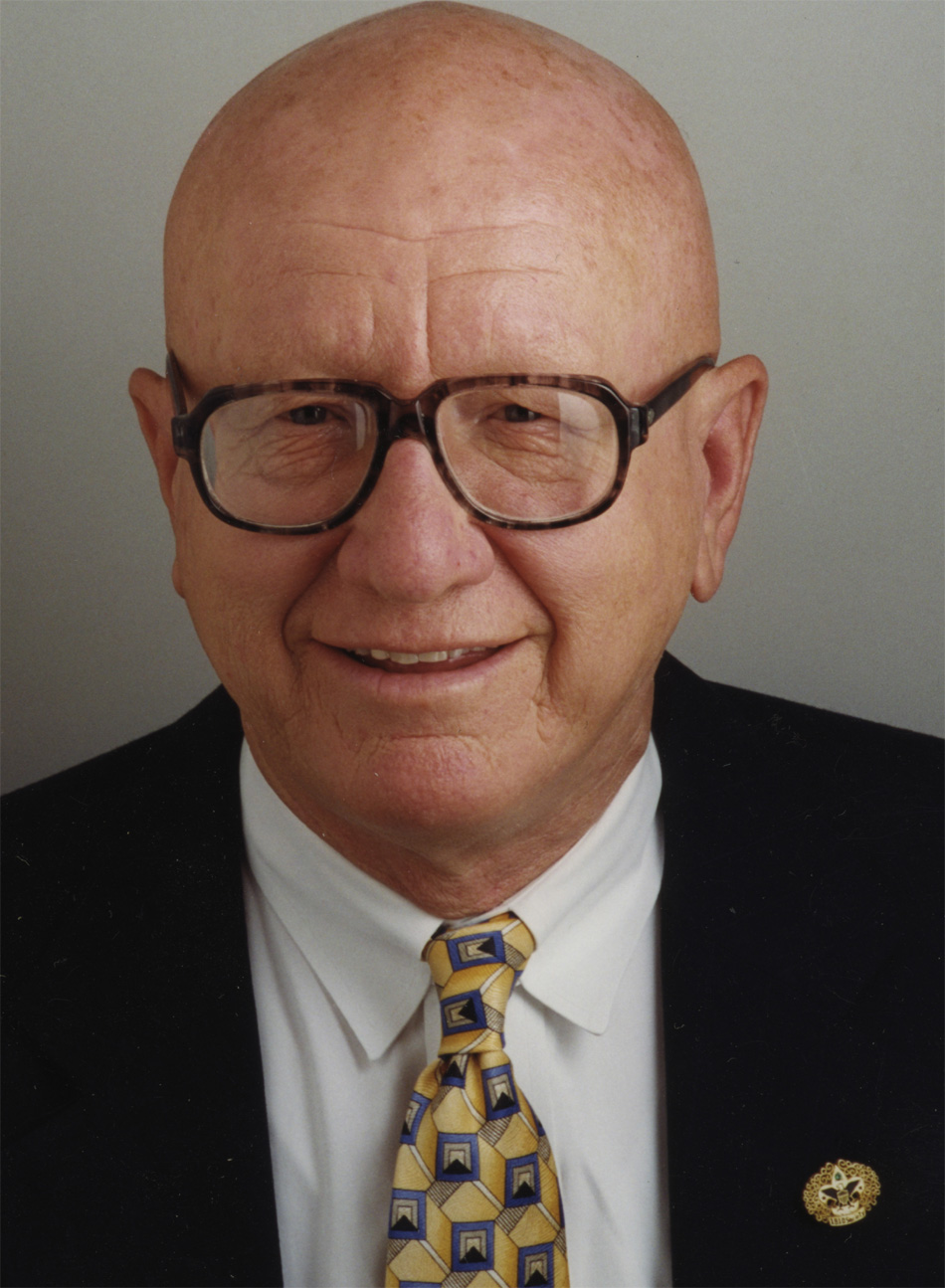
Richard R. Pieper Sr.

Richard R. Pieper Sr. (born March 30, 1936), is an American entrepreneur and philanthropist. He is currently Chairman Emeritus for PPC Partners, Inc. headquartered in Milwaukee, Wisconsin.

== Early life and education ==
Pieper attended Milwaukee Public Schools, finishing high school by correspondence courses with the American School of Correspondence before entering the University of Miami where he was listed as a Who's Who in Colleges and Universities – 1959, Outstanding Young Men of America - 1965.

== PieperPower ==
In 1961 Pieper assumed leadership of Pieper Electric, a Milwaukee electrical service company founded in 1947 by his father Julius Pieper. At the time Pieper Electric employed three electricians and operated from the Pieper home in Milwaukee. By the early 1970s, Pieper had grown the business to include branches in 3 states across the country, then employing 1,100 people; today, there are 4,000 in 8 states. Pieper Electric was rebranded as PIEPERPOWER and the family of companies were united as PPC Partners, Inc. In 2003 Pieper and his family sold the majority interest in PPC Partners, Inc. to the employees. Pieper is now Chairman Emeritus of the Board of the company.

== Later career and philanthropy ==
Pieper devotes most of his time to expanding the role of character development in K-12 education school leaders and the model of servant leadership in institutions. In 2006 Pieper started the Wisconsin Character Education Partnership which recognizes schools of character across the state and was instrumental in forging a partnership with Alverno College to offer Wisconsin K-12 school principals a special leadership Academy in Character Education. Pieper received the American Patriot of Character Award from the Character Education Partnership. The award was presented at the 2013 National Forum on Character Education in Washington DC. He is a past recipient of The Bravo Entrepreneur Award for Lifetime Achievement and was presented with the 2009 Lakefront Leadership Award from the Milwaukee Community Sailing Center for his support of Milwaukee's cultural lakefront corridor. Pieper was inducted into the Wisconsin Business Hall of Fame honoring him for his civic involvement. He was awarded one of the National Electrical Contractor Association's (NECA) highest honors, the McGraw award, recognizing his contributions to the electrical contracting industry, and a PhD in engineering from the Milwaukee School of Engineering. Pieper is emeritus Director of the Greenleaf Center for Servant Leadership and was Chairman of the 2021 International Servant Leadership Summit which registered 1,300 participants representing 27 countries and offered 112 virtual sessions. At the October 26, 2024 Servant Leadership Scholars Conference, hosted by MSOE, Richard Pieper was honored by scholars gathered from around the world. He received an award that read: “In grateful recognition of your decades of philanthropy and personal support of the Servant Leadership movement. In your quest to find the next Mandela or Mother Teresa, perhaps you became what you were searching for.”

In March 2026, Alverno College awarded Richard with the Spirit of Alverno Award. The Marquette University Police Department awarded Richard with the Community Partner Award in May 2026.

Pieper is co-founder of the Suzanne and Richard Pieper Family Foundation. The Pieper family is a significant benefactor of Discovery World and sponsor of the Pieper Education Gallery at the Milwaukee Art Museum, as V. P. of Marketing created Gallery Night, out of a problem, for the M.A.M., dealers and the Wisconsin art community as well as the Education Center at the Milwaukee Community Sailing Center. The family has gifted has gifted $2.6 to $2.8 million to establish Servant Leaders Chairs and has funded Pieper Chairs at Milwaukee School of Engineering, the UW Madison College of Engineering and Ripon College in Wisconsin. Pieper currently serves on several boards: Three Harbors Council-Boy Scouts of America, The Milwaukee Boys & Girls Clubs of America, Lutheran Social Services of Wisconsin & Upper Michigan, Inc. and The Florentine Opera. Previous board participation includes the Elliot companies in VA, Board of Trustees Greenleaf Center for Servant Leadership, Junior Achievement of Southeastern Wisconsin, Young Presidents' Organization, Wisconsin Council of Economic Education, Wisconsin Diabetes Association, Milwaukee Jaycees, the Milwaukee Art Museum and the Boelter Companies.
