= Henry Palmer (surgeon) =

American doctor (1827–1895)

Henry Palmer M.D.
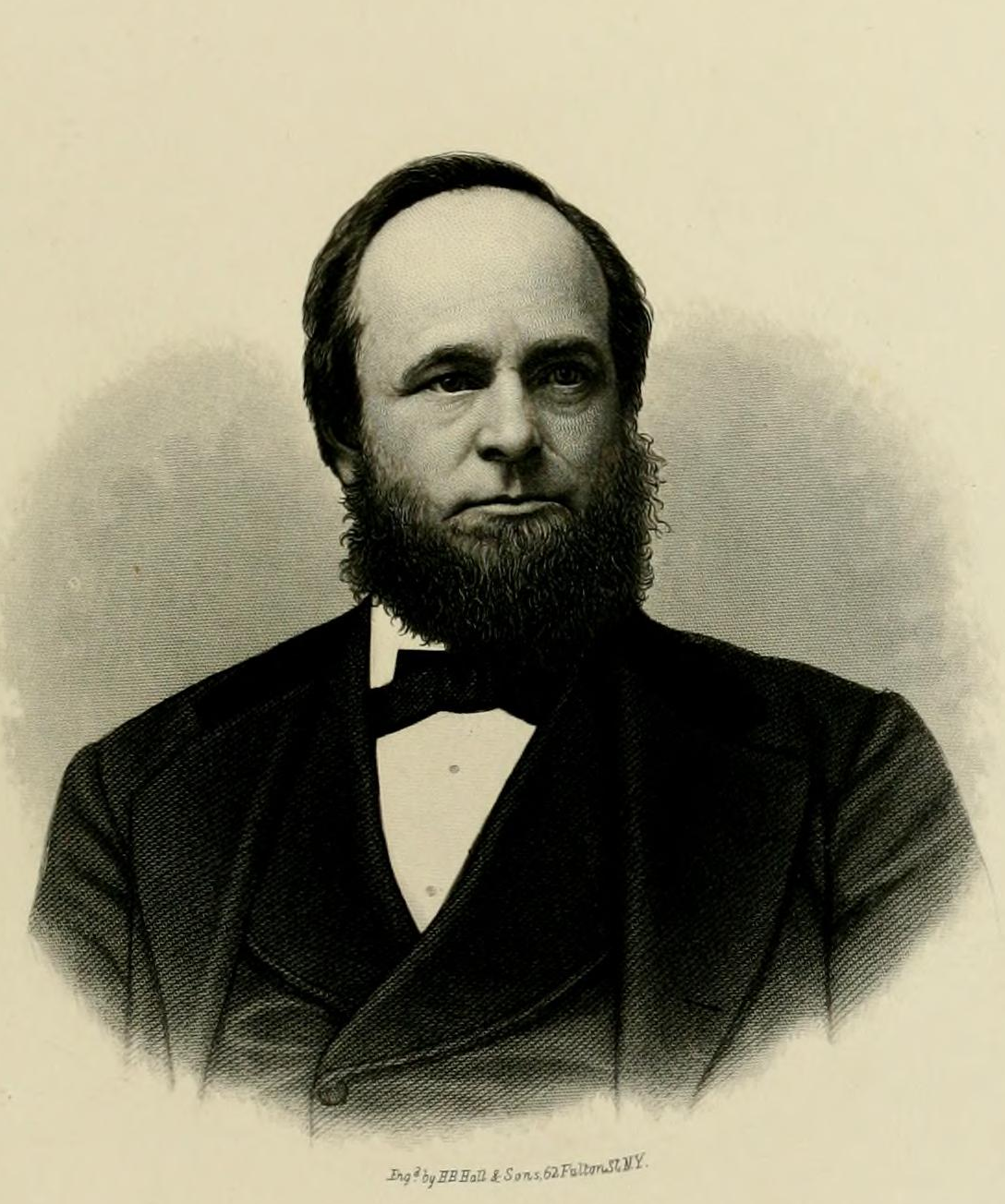

Surgeon General of Wisconsin
- In office January 14, 1880 – January 5, 1891
- Governor: William E. Smith; Jeremiah McLain Rusk; William D. Hoard
- Preceded by: Erastus B. Wolcott
- Succeeded by: Nicholas Senn

12th Mayor of Janesville, Wisconsin
- In office April 1866 – April 1868
- Preceded by: John Mitchell
- Succeeded by: Alfred A. Jackson

Personal details
- Born: July 30, 1827 New Hartford, New York, U.S.
- Died: June 15, 1895 (aged 67) Janesville, Wisconsin, U.S.
- Resting place: Oak Hill Cemetery, Janesville, Wisconsin
- Spouse: Edna Almira Hoyt (died 1910)
- Children: Clara Leclair (Felton)^{(b. 1855; died 1883)}; William Henry Palmer^{(b. 1860; died 1939)}; Eloise (Mouat)^{(b. 1872; died 1945)}
- Education: Albany Medical College
- Occupation: Physician, surgeon

Military service
- Allegiance: United States
- Branch/service: United States Army; Union Army
- Years of service: 1861–1865
- Rank: Surgeon; Brevet Lt. Colonel, USV
- Unit: 7th Reg. Wis. Vol. Infantry
- Battles/wars: American Civil War

Henry Palmer (July 30, 1827 – June 15, 1895) was an American physician and educator. He served as a Union Army surgeon in the American Civil War, and later became Surgeon General of the state of Wisconsin. He was also the 12th mayor of Janesville, Wisconsin, and was professor of surgery at the College of Physicians and Surgeons of Chicago.

== Early life ==
Palmer was born in New Hartford, New York, in 1827. He graduated from Albany Medical College in 1854. Shortly after graduating, Palmer traveled to Europe for vacation and ended up volunteering as a surgeon in the Crimean War. In 1856, Palmer moved to Janesville, Wisconsin.

== Military career ==
Palmer joined the 7th Wisconsin Volunteer Infantry Regiment in 1861. The following year, he was named Brigadier Surgeon of U.S. Volunteers and remained in the position until the conclusion of the Civil War. Additionally, he was chief surgeon at York U.S. Army Hospital.

== Post-war ==
Palmer would spend time as a member of the faculty at the University of Illinois College of Medicine. From 1880 to 1890, he was Surgeon General of Wisconsin. Palmer was twice Mayor of Janesville. He died in 1895.

Military offices
Preceded by Erastus B. Wolcott	Surgeon General of Wisconsin; January 14, 1880 – January 5, 1891	Succeeded by Nicholas Senn
Political offices
Preceded by John Mitchell	Mayor of Janesville, Wisconsin; April 1866 – April 1868	Succeeded by Alfred A. Jackson
