= Milwaukee Community Sailing Center =

Milwaukee Community Sailing Center

The Milwaukee Community Sailing Center is a private, non-profit 501(c)(3) agency. The Sailing Center provides educational and recreational sailing programs to those who wish to gain access to Lake Michigan and learn to sail; regardless of age, ability, or financial concerns. In 2004, MCSC celebrated its 25th year of sailing.

Much like a co-operative, the Sailing Center owns and maintains over 80 boats and provides members no-charge access to the fleet after they successfully demonstrate basic sailing skills and earn a rating. Membership is low cost, less than the cost of insurance on a privately owned sailboat, and works on a sliding scale based on age, experience and income. The Sailing Center also offers private boat owners 24-hour access to the lake, year-round boat and dinghy storage, mast stepping boat launching and haul out services.

Each summer the Sailing Center partners with local organizations to provide sailing opportunities to thousands of at-risk and economically disadvantaged youth, the physically challenged and others. The Sailing Center also provides social activities and volunteer opportunities to members.

== Mission ==
The Milwaukee Community Sailing Center is a private, non-profit agency that works to strengthen the sport of sailing through an active and safe educational program and on-the-water experience.

== Location and sailing area ==
The Milwaukee Community Sailing Center (43°02′42.76″N 87°53′12.0″W) is located north of downtown in Veterans Park at McKinley Marina. The sailing area includes the McKinley mooring basin, the harbor behind Milwaukee's break wall, and for sailors who demonstrate proficiency and earn appropriate ratings and endorsements, Milwaukee Bay to one mile off the breakwall.

== Fleet ==
The fleet at the Milwaukee Community Sailing Center includes 35 22-foot (6.7 m) Pearson Ensigns, 7 J-24s, 4 Solings and two larger cruising sailboats (a C&C 29 and a Catalina 27). Youth and adults aspiring to centerboard sailing will experience a fleet of 10 Catalina 14.2s, 5 Club 420s, 6 RS-Touras, and 10 ILCA (formerly Laser) sailing dinghies. The MCSC support staff use a large fleet of safely boats, mostly Boston Whalers.

== History ==
Founded in 1976, the Milwaukee Community Sailing Center (MCSC) was created by a group of local sailors who sought to form a community organization to make sailing accessible to all in the Milwaukee area and dispel the myth that sailing is an elitist sport. With seed money from Ted Seaver, Doug Drake, and Milwaukee County, a maintenance facility was built. Completed in 1980, and the Sailing Center opened with lessons and boat rentals with a seasonal staff of 10 and a small fleet of Tech Dinghies, Volants and a safety boat.

Twelve students graduated from sailing courses in the first year and gained access to sail the shared fleet. In the summer of 2023, MCSC offered over 1200 instructional sessions and members sailed almost 7000 times. In 1985, MCSC began "Prams in the Park", a program designed to bring sailing and water safety kids from 8–11 years old in Milwaukee County Park lagoons.

Today, MCSC offers entry-level, intermediate and advanced sailing instruction, regattas, expeditions, volunteer instructor opportunities and open sailing seven days a week on a fleet of over 80 boats, one of the largest among sailing non-profits anywhere.

A four-person full-time, year-round staff, expands to 40 during the sailing season, and serves a base of over 700 members and 600 youth participants annually.

=== Timeline ===
- 1977 - Milwaukee Community Sailing Center officially launched. Volunteers file documents forming a governing board to create and manage the Sailing Center.
- 1979 - The Milwaukee County Board of Supervisors approves the plan for the Sailing Center office and maintenance facility and announces that it will be part of the overall McKinley Marina development.
- 1980 - Bill Mosher hired as the first executive director to oversee the development of brick and mortar construction, sailing instruction and programming. Ten Volant centerboard sailboards were also purchased from Vanguard to form the nucleus of the early fleet. The Sailing Center was opened.
- 1981 - the first 12 students graduate from the an entry level youth sailing course offered
- 1983 - Sailing Center hosts the National Finn Gold Cup Regatta.
- 1984 - The Sailing Center receives Federal funding for "Prams in the Park," a new program to teach children ages 8–12 in local neighborhood parks how to sail. The program connects the Sailing Center with the larger metro area.
- 1988 - Board President Bill Ihlenfeld solicits donations of Ensigns, a 22’ keel boat, from owners across the country. Over time, the Ensign fleet grows by donation to 35 boats. The Ensign becomes the workhorse of adult sailing instruction and open sailing.
- 1990 - "Sailing is Fun Day" is created to bring multiple organizations to the Sailing Center for a special day with volunteers offering physically challenged sailors boat rides followed by a picnic.
- 1995 - The first Sailor's Ball is held to raise funds to support programs. Olympic and America's Cup Sailor Buddy Melges was honored. Fundraising reaches $175,000 raised over 9 years.
- 2000 - The Sailing Center's board of directors recognizes a need to expand and authorizes building committee to begin 25 year strategic planning.
- 2002 - $50,000 donated from an anonymous foundation funds program for at-risk kids. The Harley–Davidson Foundation funds an additional $10,000. A campaign to raise $3 million for a new facility is announced and. Peter and Olaf Harken present a $100,000 donation to the building fund at the annual Sailor's Ball, also agreeing to serve as co-chairs of the building campaign. The board of directors and staff pledge $30,000 and the Sailing Center receives an additional pledge of $50,000 by an anonymous donor.
- 2010 - Fundraising and construction comes to a successful close, and the Milwaukee Community Sailing Center opens a new headquarters and training center, with a community room, year-around classrooms, offices, bathrooms and an outdoor patio. The $2.25M 6,000-square-foot (560 m^{2}) building is heated and cooled using a geothermal system to keep operating expenses low.
- 2011 - The new facility is nominated for and receives the City of Milwaukee's Mayor's Design Award.
- 2016 - The Sailing Center hosts the North American Disabled Championship regatta.
- 2019 - Director Holly Church is recognized by US Sailing as Outstanding Organizational Leader.
- 2022 - The Sailing Center procures a fleet of 3/4-person 16-foot dinghies to be used in higher level teamwork instruction with kids and adults.
- 2023 - The Sailing Center fleet reaches 80 boats and 30,000 students taught to sail.

== Membership ==
Members of the Milwaukee Community Sailing are able to participate in all programs the Sailing Center has to offer. Upon completion of appropriate courses and after successfully demonstrating basic sailing skills, individuals have no-charge access to the fleet during Open Sailing. Members are allowed to bring guests to sail and are able to participate in the Sailing Center's racing program. Members participate in social events, take advantage of the Sailing Center's grounds, which provide volleyball courts and a picnic area, meet new people and have a great time, which is what being a member of the Sailing Center is all about. For adults and youth, the Sailing Center offers three course levels; Basic, Intermediate and Advanced.

== Outreach programs ==
The Milwaukee Community Sailing Center has a variety of outreach programs that provide access to Lake Michigan through sailing and water safety training. Through coordinated efforts with many community service organizations, the Sailing Center is able to provide experiences to many individuals. The following are programs that the Sailing Center has put together to provide services for the needs of those interested in the joys and benefits of sailing.
