= Lake Park, Milwaukee =

- Lake Park
- U.S. National Register of Historic Places
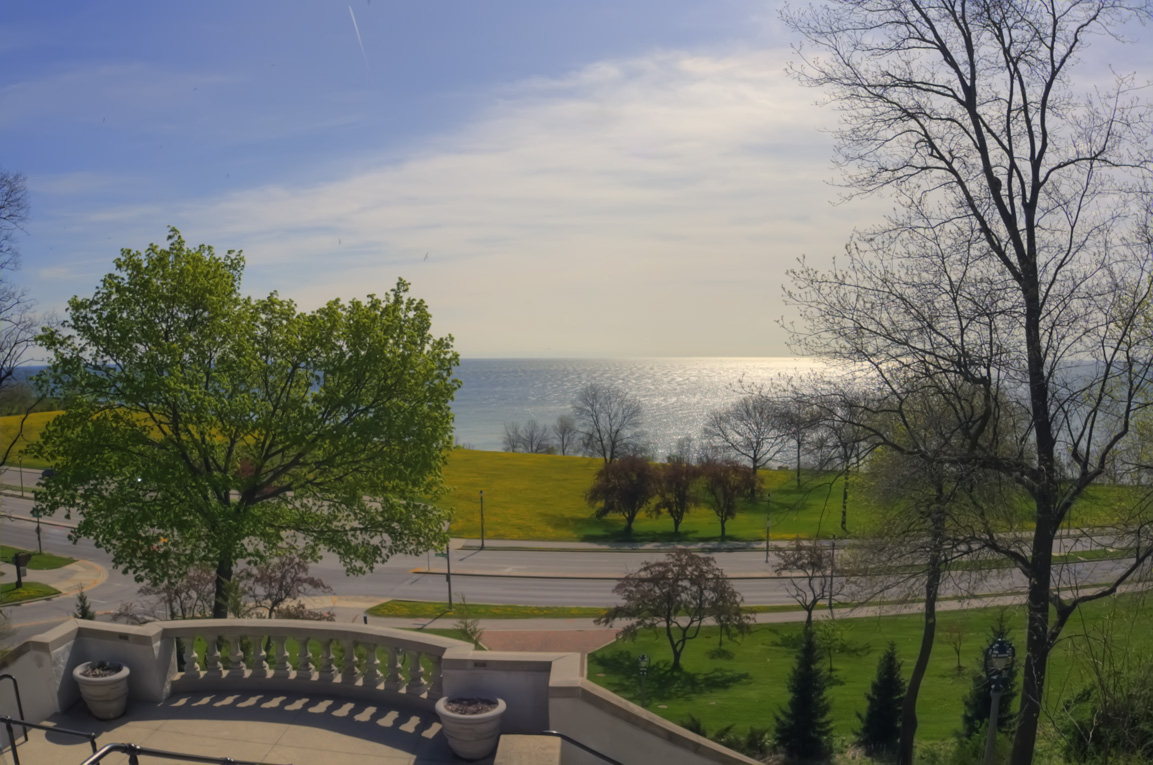
- Location: Milwaukee
- Coordinates: 43.0696°N 87.8702°W
- Area: Lake Front
- Architect: Frederick Law Olmsted
- Architectural style: Romantic
- NRHP reference No.: 93000339
- Added to NRHP: 1993

Lake Park is an urban park covering 138.1 acres (559,000 m^{2}), stretching 1 mile (1.6 km) on a bluff above Lake Michigan in Milwaukee, Wisconsin.

== Design ==
Lake Park was designed in the late 19th century by Frederick Law Olmsted, who also designed Central Park in New York City along with many others. Believing that access to nature had a civilizing and restorative effect on the urban public, Olmsted designed Lake Park in the Romantic tradition, with a preference for natural (over formal) landscaping, winding paths, a variety of vistas, incorporation of wildlife, and a balance between active recreation and more passive enjoyment.

Milwaukee architect Alfred Clas designed the park's pavilion, dedicated in 1903, as well as the grand stairway, added in 1908, that led from the pavilion to the lakeshore promenade below.

== Description ==
Lake Park in 1890. Historic North Point Lighthouse at left, in background.

Covering 138.1-acre (559,000 m^{2}) on the shore of Lake Michigan, the park is part of a mostly contiguous stretch of lakefront amenities that extend north from Milwaukee's downtown, including Bradford Beach, various parks, McKinley Marina, and the Milwaukee Art Museum.

The park terrain includes both bluffs and ravines. In addition, Lake Park is home to the last remaining Indian mound in the city of Milwaukee. The others were destroyed by early settlers of the city and surrounding area.

A portion of the Oak Leaf Trail Lake Line runs through the park.

It also contains North Point Lighthouse, which was built in 1888.

A 6-hole golf course was built in 1903, expanding to 18 holes in 1930.

Lake Park is the favorite park of John Hamann, a local celebrity known as the Milverine for his resemblance to Wolverine when walking shirtless.

== History ==
In July 2016, Lake Park became a popular location for Poké-Stops in the game Pokémon Go. In August 2016, the Milwaukee County Parks Department asked Niantic to remove the game stops until a permit was received, in compliance with a county ordinance.

== See also ==
- Eight Stone Lions
- Erastus B. Wolcott
- Parks of Milwaukee
- East Side, Milwaukee
