= Erastus B. Wolcott =

19th century American surgeon

Erastus B. Wolcott M.D.
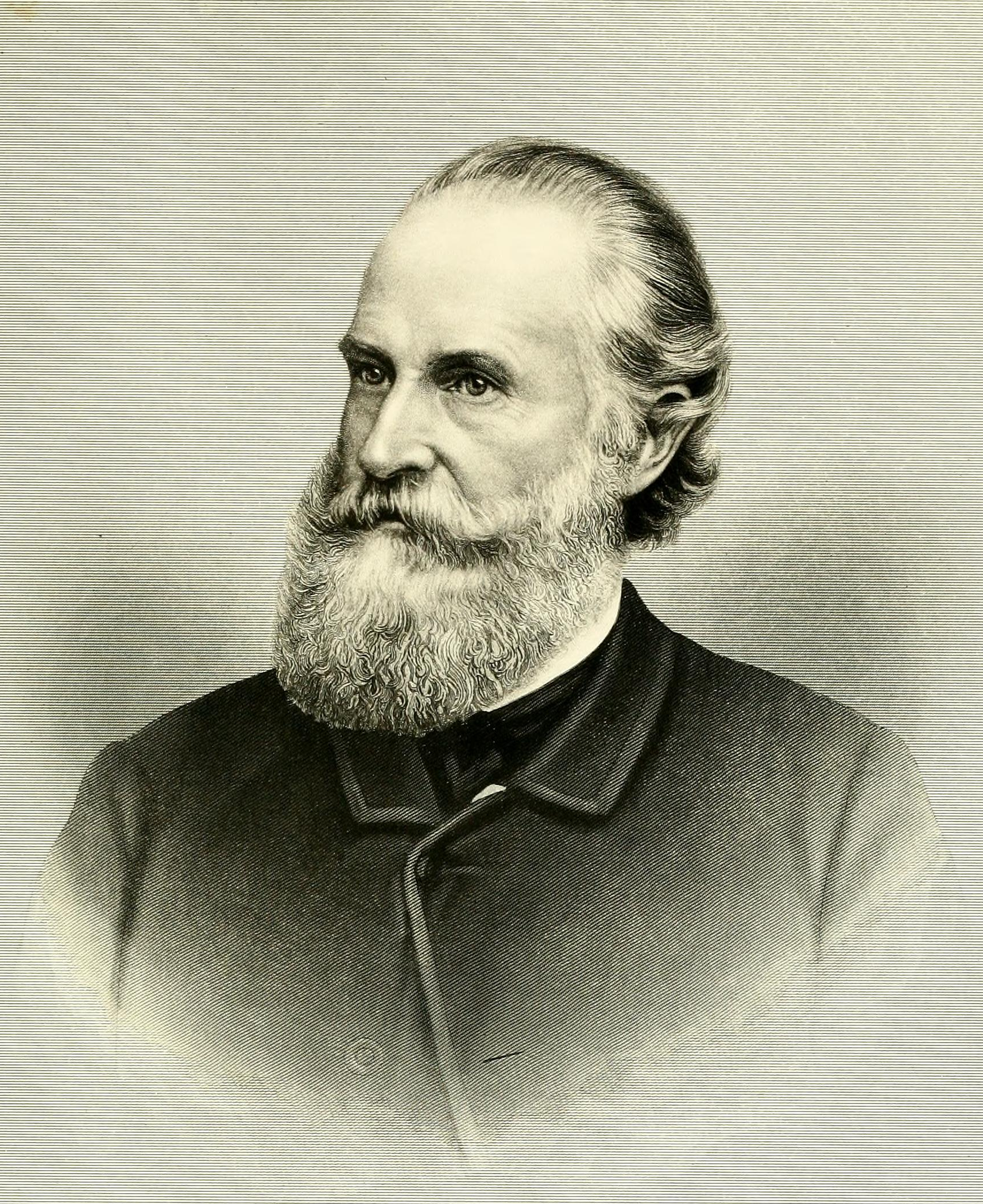
- From History of Milwaukee from its first settlement to the year 1895 (1895)

Surgeon General of Wisconsin
- In office April 17, 1861 – January 5, 1880
- Governor: nine governors: Alexander Randall; Louis P. Harvey; Edward Salomon; James T. Lewis; Lucius Fairchild; Cadwallader C. Washburn; William Robert Taylor; Harrison Ludington; William E. Smith
- Preceded by: John E. Garner
- Succeeded by: Henry Palmer

Personal details
- Born: October 18, 1804 Benton, New York, U.S.
- Died: January 5, 1880 (aged 75) Milwaukee, Wisconsin, U.S.
- Cause of death: Pneumonia
- Resting place: Forest Home Cemetery, Milwaukee
- Spouses: Elizabeth Jane Dousman (m. 1836; died 1860); Laura J. Ross (m. 1869–1880)
- Children: Catherine Jane Wolcott^{(b. 1837; died 1839)}; Arthur Wolcott^{(b. 1840; died 1844)}; Wellesley Wolcott^{(died young)}; Marion Jane (Yates)^{(b. 1842; died 1917)}; Douglas Dousman Wolcott^{(b. 1845; died 1899)}; Herro Wolcott^{(b. 1846; died 1847)}
- Education: College of Physicians and Surgeons of New York
- Profession: Physician, surgeon

Military service
- Allegiance: United States
- Branch/service: United States Army; Wisconsin Territory Militia; Wisconsin National Guard
- Years of service: 1836–1839 (USA); 1842–1848 (Territory); 1861–1880 (WNG)
- Rank: Major Gen., WNG
- Battles/wars: American Civil War

Erastus Bradley Wolcott (October 18, 1804 – January 5, 1880) was an American medical soctor, surgeon, and Wisconsin pioneer. He was surgeon general of Wisconsin during the American Civil War, serving nearly 20 years, from 1861 until his death in 1880. He was also known for being the first physician to excise a Human kidney. In contemporaneous documents, his name was often abbreviated as E. B. Wolcott.

Wolcott is immortalized with a 15ft bronze equestrian statue in the center of Milwaukee's Lake Park.

== Early life ==
Erastus B. Wolcott was born in Yates County, New York, in October 1804. He received a thorough academic and fine arts education. He and his brothers and cousins were all well trained in musical instruments and, as children, performed for the Marquis de Lafayette during his visit to Rochester, New York, in 1825. In the meantime, Wolcott had been studying a medical apprenticeship under Joshua Lee, and was licensed to practice medicine in Yates County that same year. For the next several years, he served as a medical advisor and surgeon for a mining company in North Carolina while also maintaining a medical practice in Charleston, South Carolina.

In 1830, he attended the College of Physicians and Surgeons of New York. He graduated in 1833, and took up a practice in New York for three years.

In 1836, he passed a medical board examination and was appointed a surgeon in the United States Army. In the federal service, he participated in the Cherokee removal, and was then assigned to Fort Mackinac, in the Michigan Territory.

== Medical career ==
In 1839, he resigned his commission in the Army and moved to the new village of Milwaukee, in the Wisconsin Territory. At that time, he was the first professional surgeon in the area and his skills were in high demand from many surrounding settlements. As a result, he became well known across much of the entire Wisconsin Territory. In his early days in Milwaukee, however, he ran afoul of existing medical societies, because he offered surgical and medical consultation to Homeopathic physicians.

During these years, he founded the Medical Society of the Wisconsin Territory, which later became the Wisconsin State Medical Society, and also co-founded the Medical Society of Milwaukee County. He also attempted to found a medical college in Milwaukee in 1850, but the school failed. That same year he was appointed to the board of regents of the University of Wisconsin.

Wolcott was a pioneer of several new surgical techniques, and was recorded as the first surgeon to perform a live Nephrectomy (removing a human kidney).

He was described as an expert in the study of anatomy and generally worked unassisted, due to the lack of trained medical personnel in the territory.

== Surgeon general ==
In 1842, he was appointed surgeon general of the Wisconsin Territory's militia. He was appointed colonel of a regiment of the territory militia in 1846, and was later made major general, overseeing the first division of the militia.

After the outbreak of the American Civil War, in April 1861, one of the first military actions by Wisconsin governor Alexander Randall was to reappoint Wolcott as surgeon general. He remained surgeon general of the state until his death in 1880.

The job of surgeon general took on new importance with the war, and Wolcott took part in the raising of all of Wisconsin's regiments, and personally interviewed and selected each of the regimental surgeons. As soldiers began returning from war, he played an active role in seeing to their welfare. He was one of the leading proponents for the creation of the Milwaukee Soldiers Home, and later became one of the managers of the facility. He was also an advocate for building up mental health and educational facilities in the state.

In addition to his medical practice and government duties, he was an avowed abolitionist. After the arrest of Joshua Glover—a man who had escaped slavery and was arrested in Wisconsin under the Fugitive Slave Act of 1850—Wolcott presided over a meeting of citizens to denounce the arrest and condemn the institution of slavery.

== Personal life and legacy ==
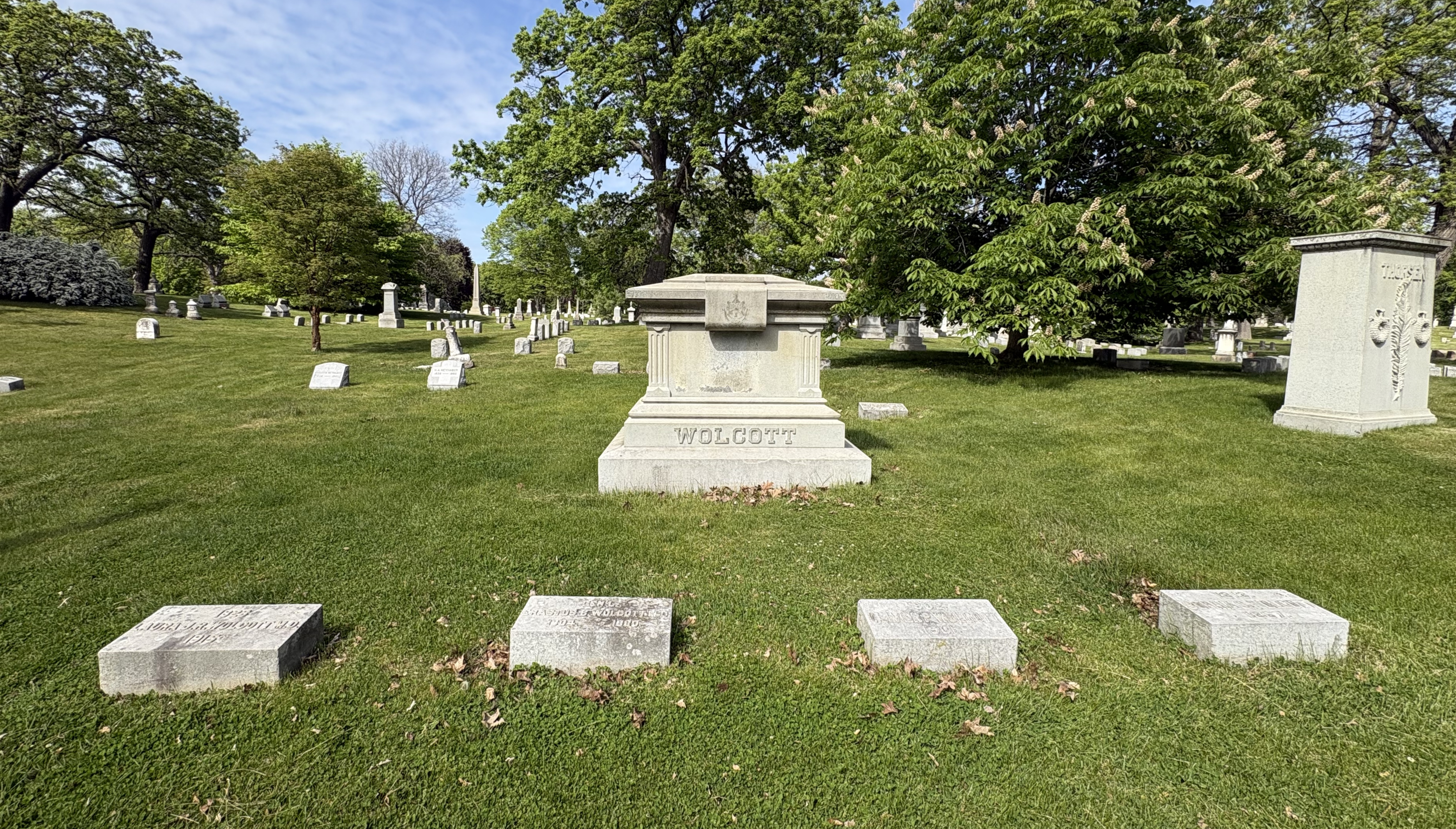
Graves of Laura and Erastus Wolcott at Forest Home Cemetery

Erastus Wolcott met and married his first wife, Elizabeth Jane Dousman, at Fort Mackinac, Michigan. They had six children together, but four died in infancy. Elizabeth died in 1860.

In 1869, he advocated for admitting Laura J. Ross to the Milwaukee City Medical Society. Ross was the third woman in the United States to earn a medical degree, and the first in Wisconsin. Shortly after her admission, Ross and Wolcott married, and Ross took the name Laura Ross Wolcott. She survived him and later became a leader in the Women's suffrage movement. Both are buried at Forest Home Cemetery in Milwaukee.

Wolcott is immortalized with a 15ft bronze equestrian statue in the center of Milwaukee's Lake Park. The statue was crafted by Francis Herman Packer.

Military offices
Preceded by John E. Garner	Surgeon General of Wisconsin; April 17, 1861 – January 5, 1880	Succeeded by Henry Palmer
