= Nephrectomy =

Surgical removal of a kidney

- Before and after a radical nephrectomy
- ICD-9-CM: 55.5
- MeSH: D009392
- OPS-301 code: 5-554

A nephrectomy is the surgical removal of a kidney, performed to treat a number of kidney diseases including kidney cancer. It is also done to remove a normal healthy kidney from a living or deceased donor, which is part of a kidney transplant procedure.

== History ==
The first recorded nephrectomy was performed in 1861 by Erastus B. Wolcott in Wisconsin. The patient had had a large tumor and the operation was initially successful, but the patient died fifteen days later. The first planned nephrectomy was performed by the German surgeon Gustav Simon on August 2, 1869, in Heidelberg. Simon practiced the operation beforehand in animal experiments. He proved that one healthy kidney can be sufficient for urine excretion in humans.

== Indications ==
There are various indications for this procedure, including renal cell carcinoma, a non-functioning kidney (which may cause high blood pressure) and a congenitally small kidney (in which the kidney is swelling, causing it to press on nerves, which can cause pain in unrelated areas such as the back).

Nephrectomy for renal cell carcinoma is rapidly being modified to allow partial removal of the kidney. Nephrectomy is also performed for the purpose of living donor kidney transplantation. A nephroureterectomy (or ureteronephrectomy) is the removal of a kidney and the entire ureter and a small cuff of the bladder for urothelial cancer of the kidney or ureter.

== Procedure ==
Laparoscopic nephrectomy

The surgery is performed with the patient under general anesthesia. A kidney can be removed through an open incision or by laparoscopic surgery. For the open procedure, the surgeon makes an incision in the side of the abdomen to reach the kidney. Depending on circumstances, the incision can also be made midline. The ureter and blood vessels are disconnected, and the kidney is then removed. The laparoscopic approach utilizes three or four small (5–10 mm) cuts in the abdominal and flank area. The kidney is completely detached inside the body and then placed in a bag. One of the incisions is then expanded to remove the kidney for cancer operations. If the kidney is being removed for other causes, it can be morcellated and removed through the small incisions. Recently, this procedure is performed through a single incision in the patient's navel. This advanced technique is called single port laparoscopy.

A total nephrectomy is the removal of at least the entire kidney, whereas a 'radical nephrectomy' also includes at least some perinephric fat, possibly including Gerota's fascia, and usually also the ipsilateral adrenal gland.

For some illnesses, there are alternatives today that do not require the extraction of a kidney. Such alternatives include renal embolization for those who are poor candidates for surgery, or partial nephrectomy if possible.

Occasionally renal cell cancers can involve adjacent organs, including the inferior vena cava (IVC), the colon, the pancreas or the liver. If the cancer has not spread to distant sites, it may be safely and completely removed surgically via open or laparoscopic techniques.

=== Kidney donation ===
In January 2009, a woman who had previously had a hysterectomy was able to donate a kidney and have it removed through her vagina. The operation took place at Johns Hopkins Medical Center. This is the first time a healthy kidney has been removed via this method, though it has been done in the past for nephrectomies carried out due to pathology. Removing organs through orifices prevents some of the pain of an incision and the need for a cosmetically unappealing larger scar. Any advance which leads to a decrease in pain and scarring has the potential to boost donor numbers. This operation has also taken place at the Cleveland Clinic, which first performed transvaginal Nephrectomy. Living donation has a mortality risk of 0.03% during the procedure and seems to result in similar health outcomes to controls.

== After care ==
Pain medication is often given to the patient after surgery for pain at the site of the incision. An IV with fluids is administered. Electrolyte balance and fluids are carefully monitored, because these are the functions of the kidneys. It is possible that the remaining kidney does not take over all functionality. A patient may have to stay in the hospital between 2 and 7 days depending on the procedure and complications. Patients who have had open surgery will have to stay in hospital longer than those who have had laparoscopic surgery. Over the long-term, a person with only one kidney ("solitary kidney") may be more prone to developing chronic kidney disease (CKD). A 2014 study suggested that the lifelong risk of CKD is several-fold higher in kidney donors, although the absolute risk is still very small. A 2017 article in the New England Journal of Medicine suggested that persons with only one kidney, including those who have donated a kidney for transplantation or those whose kidney was removed for cancer, should avoid a high protein diet and limit their protein intake to less than one gram per kilogram body weight per day in order to reduce the long-term risk of CKD.

== Partial nephrectomy ==
Partial Nephrectomy
- Before and after a partial nephrectomy
- ICD-9-CM: 55.4
- MeSH: D009392
- OPS-301 code: 5-554

Partial nephrectomy is the surgical removal of a kidney tumor along with a thin rim of normal kidney, with the two aims of curing the cancer and preserving as much normal kidney as possible.

=== History ===
Czerny first described a partial nephrectomy in 1890. However, due to limited x-ray and imaging capabilities to find small kidney tumors and significant complications associated with early operations it was largely abandoned. More recently, with improved imaging, improved surgical techniques and increased kidney tumor detection, partial nephrectomy is performed more often.

=== Indications ===
A partial nephrectomy should be attempted when there is a kidney tumor in a solitary kidney, when there are kidney tumors in both kidneys, or when removing the entire kidney could result in kidney failure and the need for dialysis.

Partial nephrectomy is also the standard of care for nearly all patients with small renal masses (<4 cm in size). Most renal masses between 4-7 centimeters can also be treated by partial nephrectomy if they are located in the proper position. Renal masses larger than 7 centimeters are generally treated with radical nephrectomy unless the tumor occurs in a solitary kidney, there are tumors on both sides or kidney function is bad. Patients who are told their tumors are too big or too hard for a partial nephrectomy may want to seek another opinion because surgeons who take care of many patients with kidney cancer are more often able to spare the kidney than those who only see a few cases.

=== Procedure ===
A partial nephrectomy is performed with a patient under general anesthesia as well. A partial nephrectomy can be performed through an open, laparoscopic or robotic approach. The patient is typically placed on the operating room bed lying on the side opposite the kidney tumor. The goal of the procedure is to remove the kidney tumor along with a thin rim of normal kidney tissue. Because the kidneys clean the blood, all blood eventually flows through the kidneys and 25% of it will go into the kidneys with each heart beat. In order to safely remove the kidney tumor, the blood flow to the kidney is often temporarily blocked off. The tumor is then cut out and the surgeon must sew the remaining kidney back together. Partial nephrectomy is often an alternative to complete, or radical, nephrectomy for renal cell cancer.

=== Complications ===
Patients who undergo partial nephrectomy experience complications around 15-25% of the time. The most common complications are bleeding, infection, and urinary leak.

=== Cancer control, quality of life, and survival ===
Partial nephrectomy offers the same chance of cure from the renal cell cancer as radical nephrectomy. This was confirmed in a recent meta-analysis. Partial nephrectomy has been shown to maintain kidney function better than total removal. There is some debate whether this preservation of kidney function leads to long-term benefits to the patient. Some studies have found that patients treated by partial nephrectomy live longer than patients who had their whole kidney removed. Other studies have found the opposite. Partial nephrectomy has been associated with better quality of life compared to radical nephrectomy.

== See also ==
- Kidney donation
- List of surgeries by type
