= York General Hospital (Pennsylvania) =

American Civil War hospital

Coordinates: 39.956487°N 76.727305°W

- Penn Common, York, Pennsylvania
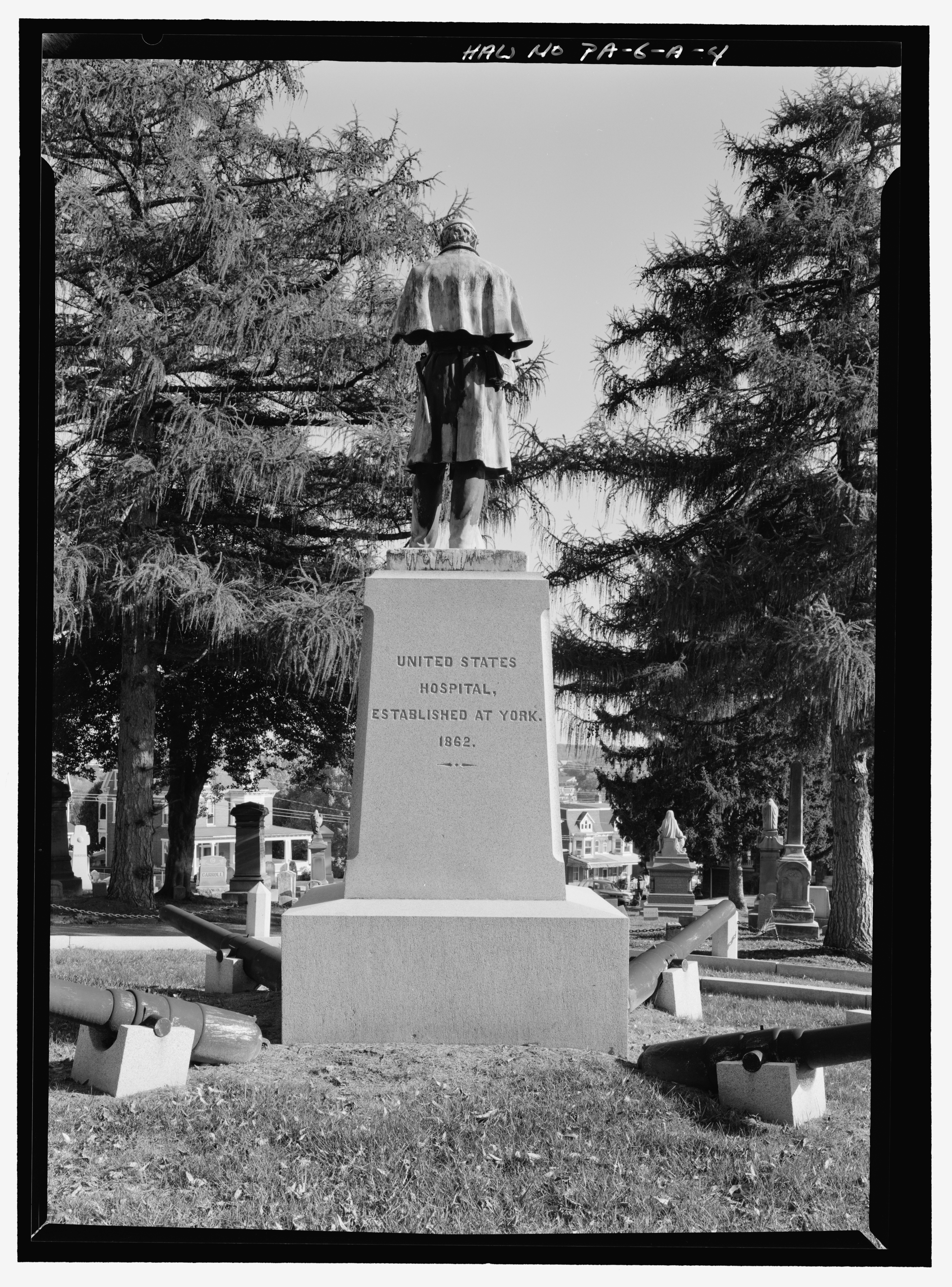
- Soldiers' Monument commemorating York General Hospital, Prospect Hill Cemetery in York, Pennsylvania

Site information
- Controlled by: Union Army

Site history
- Built: 1862
- In use: July 1862–1865
- Battles/wars: American Civil War

The York U.S. Army Hospital was one of Pennsylvania's largest military hospitals during the American Civil War. It was established in York, Pennsylvania to treat wounded and sick soldiers of the Union army.

== History ==
The hospital was established in July 1862 on Penn Common, a large level, grassy area just south of downtown York. The sprawling facility consisted of numerous barracks, infirmaries, offices, and support facilities such as laundries, stables, and a mortuary. Among the early patients were hundreds of wounded men transported to York following the September 17, 1862, Battle of Antietam. Dr. Henry Palmer of the 7th Wisconsin Infantry served as the chief surgeon throughout most of the war.

In response to the establishment of hospital facilities at York, soldier support groups were created in communities across Pennsylvania. Among those was the Soldiers' Aid Society in Columbia, Pennsylvania which worked with members of church congregations in their community to raise funds to support the care of patients at York General Hospital.

On April 2, 1863, roughly 600 soldiers from 20 states loyal to the Union, including members of Maryland's Patapsco Guards, participated in a rally in the hospital's mess room, during which the majority of those presented expressed their support for, and formally adopted, a resolution from hospital patients which stated:

"WHEREAS, Our Government is engaged in a terrible conflict against armed rebellion and treason, and for the maintenance of national union and life; and whereas, it is becoming and proper that we, the inmates of the U.S. General Hospital at York, Pennsylvania, representing as we do twenty of the loyal States of the Union, and two hundred and fifty-nine different regiments and commands, should express our sentiments; therefore

Resolved, That in the language of our lamented countryman, Stephen A. Douglas, "there can be no neutrals in this war; there can be none but patriots and traitors," and every man in the army or out of it who is not with the government and does not assist it by his influence and exertion, to put down the rebellion; is in effect an enemy to his country, a traitor to the old flag; and opposed to the Constitution and the union of our fathers.

Resolved, That as soldiers of the Union, having voluntarily tendered our service for its defence, we are not only ready to assist the Government in its efforts to supres [sic] the rebellion, but if necessary, to lay down our lives as a sacrifice for its safety; preferring to sleep in honored graves, rather than that the present and future generations should be deprived of the blessings of civil and religious liberty which we have so longenjoyed [sic].

Resolved, That we regard the opposition to the government now inaugurated under the cover of hostility to the suspension of the writ of habeas corpus, the Emancipation Proclamation of the President, and the conscription law of the late Congress, as a mere pretext of certain unprincipled politicians who are endeavoring to divert the popular mind in their favor, that they may hereafter reap an advantage in the occupancy of the high offices of the government, for which they never have been, nor never will be qualified by personal competency, patriotism, or loyalty to the free institutions of the country.

Resolved, That we will continue this struggle for our nationality and the rich blessings bequeathed to us by our fathers, "though nine hundred and ninety-nine were to perish and only one of a thousand were to survive," believing that one such freeman must possess more virtue, and enjoy more happiness than a thousand slaves.

Resolved, That we look with indignation on all party prejudice, tending to make the loyal states a divided people, and will use our utmost exertions to put down all attempts to create a disloyal sentiment at the North; having left our homes to fight treason and traitors in our front, we do not wish to be compelled to crush any in our rear; we are, as were the patriots of former times, for the "Union now and forever, one and inseparable."

Resolved, That as loyal men and Union soldiers, we hold ourselves in readiness to oppose by all lawful means, those whose feelings are hostile to the government, who have arrayed themselves against its constituted authorities, and furthermore, we will follow and implicitly obey, as we have heretofore done, whoever may be placed over us; having full faith that we are battling for the right, and that victory must finally crown our efforts.

Resolved, That although we depreciate the horrors and necessities of war, and are at all times anxious for peace, we have no terms to propose to the rebels in arms against the Government; and will accept no compromise with them, until they lay down their arms and voluntarily return to their former allegiance;

Resolved, That we, the soldiers in York Hospital, Pennsylvania, desire to record our detestation and contempt for the so called Copperhead party of the North-a party composed of traitors, too cowardly to go openly over to the enemy, but who are doing all they can to embarrass the Administration and give aid and comfort to the rebels, by raising false issues and creating discontent among the people; and that we desire to let our friends at home know that neither the leaden pills of Jeff Davis, nor the medicated ones of Doctors here, have yet purged us of our loyalty; but that on the contrary, we are ready now as ever, (if our health and physical condition permits), to resume our places in the front rank.

Resolved, That we hail with delight and give our hearty approval to the vigorous policy of Maj. Gen. Schenck, commanding this Military Department; that a copy of these resolutions be sent to him, to the President of the United States, the Governor of Pennsylvania, and that they be published in all papers in the borough of York and elsewhere, favorable to the Union cause.

In late May 1863, the Ladies’ Relief Association of Gettysburg sent supplies to the hospital, as well as items to comfort Union soldiers who had been wounded in the intense Battle of Chancellorsville. Just days later, during the Confederate invasion of 1863, the hospital and its grounds were occupied by portions of Avery's North Carolina brigade of Early's division. By August, Philadelphia newspapers were reporting "that since the fight at Gettysburg, there have been over one thousand wounded soldiers transported to the Military Hospital at York," but the numbers were, in fact, far higher with one estimate placing the number brought to York from Gettysburg at 2,500.

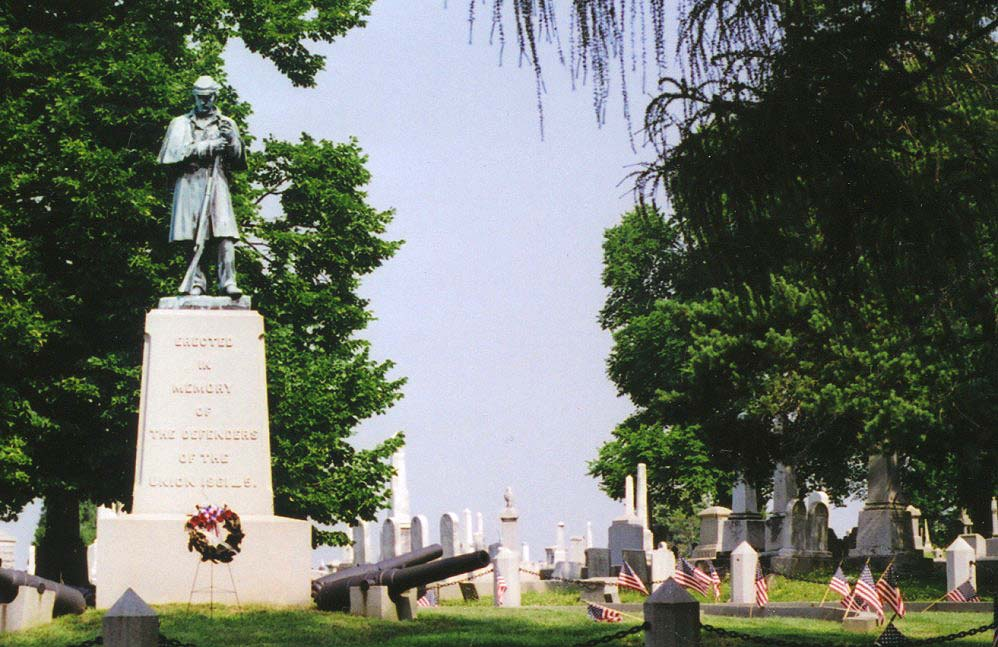
Civil War Soldiers' Monument (front) memorializing York General Hospital, Prospect Hill Cemetery, York, Pennsylvania.

By war's end, more than 14,000 soldiers passed were treated at this facility. Although the bodies of those who died here were typically shipped to their hometowns, nearly three dozen were buried in York's Prospect Hill Cemetery, where a monument of a Union soldier stands watch over the circular grave plot.

In June 1865, newspapers in and beyond Pennsylvania reported that the Union Medical Director had received orders to close several of the federal hospitals which had been created during the war to care for Union military personnel. Among those announced for closure was the York General Hospital.

The site of the hospital was converted to a city park named Penn Park, which contains an impressive large Soldiers and Sailors Monument commemorating York's Civil War heritage and veterans. A nearby bronze relief map depicts the layout of the U.S. Army Hospital.

== Hospital library, newspaper, and mail service ==
As the number of admissions to this military hospital increased, hospital chaplains and medical personnel were increasingly challenged to find ways to occupy those soldiers who were well on their way to recovery from their battle wounds or other illnesses, but not yet physically or mentally ready for discharge and return to their respective military units or homes. By 1864, a reading room had been created to provide additional space for more ambulatory soldiers to gather, and the hospital's existing library, which operated all day, each day (except Sundays when it was closed from 10 a.m. until midnight), had been expanded to include the complete works of William Shakespeare, a complete collection of the poetry of Lord Byron, multiple biographical works about key military and public figures (John Quincy Adams, Napoleon, et al.), which has been donated by the U.S. Sanitary Commission and others who supported the Union, and various sermons, books and other materials for spiritual guidance, as well as daily newspapers from New York City and other major cities, and from communities across Pennsylvania.

In addition, hospital personnel produced an in-house newspaper, The Cartridge. The publication's mission was described as follows:

"Our object is to promote the best interests of our sick and wounded companions, to cheer them during their sufferings, to afford them a medium of interchange of thought and sentiment, and to relieve the monotony of hospital life. We ask our friends to lend us their assistance and furnish such communications that will be of interest, pleasure and profit to use. Give them medium to express their thoughts and opinions on subjects now agitating the country....

As for name: we would rather fight until the last man is slain than yield to southern tyranny: though we are at present unfit to take the field and hurl the contents of our trusty cartridge boxes against armed rebellion. We endeavor to make a vigorous use of this cartridge box and arm it with such missiles as the God of nature has given us for the benefit of such rebels that are too cowardly to fight.

We would not apologize for sentiments unbiased by party prejudice that sound harshly upon copperhead antagonists. It is as laudable to opposed traitors in the north as to fight their more worthy brothers in the south."

Mail was delivered to soldiers twice each day, at 9:30 a.m. and 3:30 p.m., and could also be sent out by soldiers to family and friends twice each day, at 7:00 a.m. and noon, using special envelopes embossed with the wording, "Soldier's Letter. U.S. Army General Hospital at YORK, PENN'A." Soldiers were charged three cents per stamp.

== See also ==
- List of former United States Army medical units
