= Antoine Joseph Jobert de Lamballe =

French surgeon

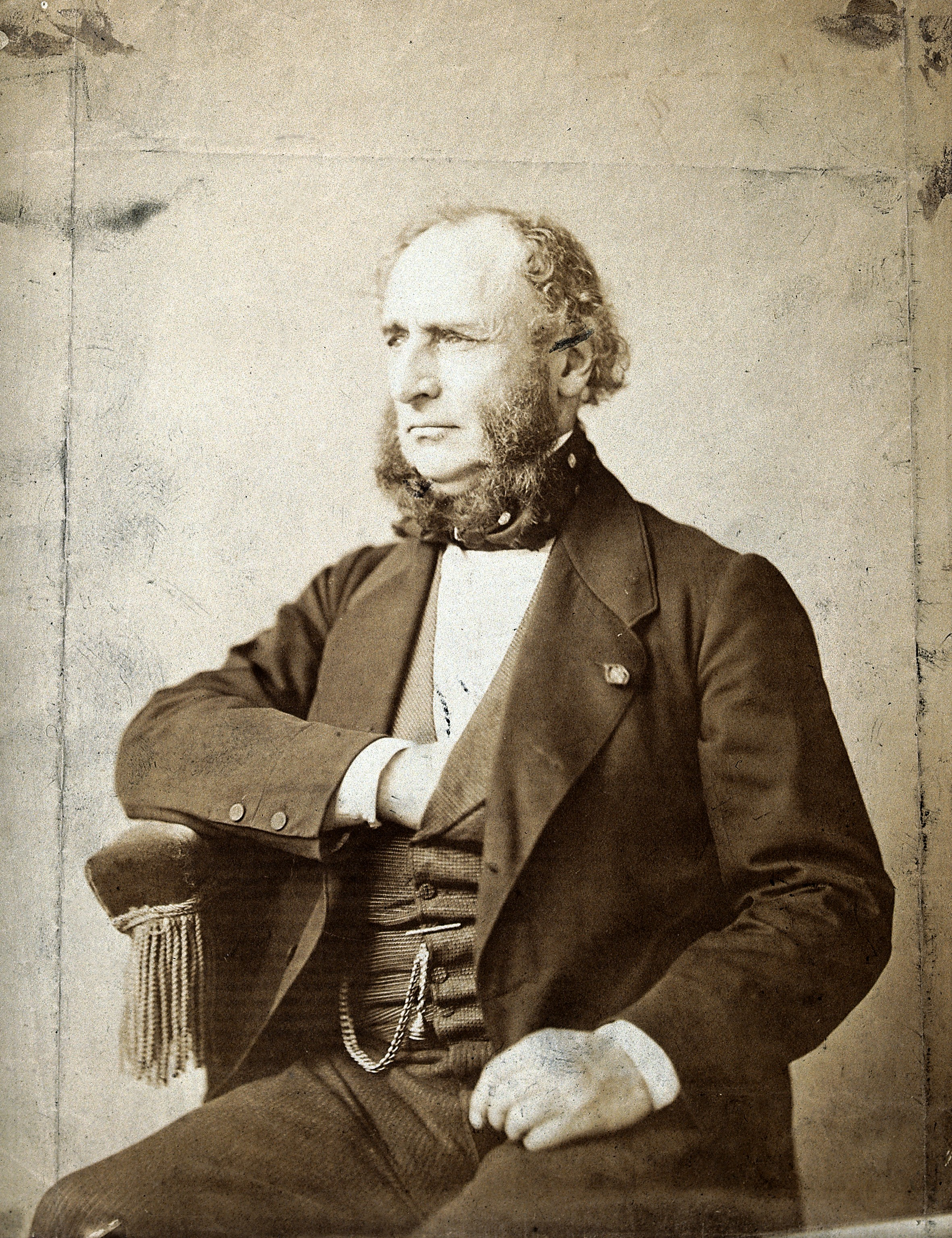

Antoine Joseph Jobert de Lamballe (17 December 1799 – 19 April 1867) was a French surgeon. He was born at Matignon, studied medicine at Paris, and in 1830 became surgeon at the Hôpital Saint-Louis. He was elected to the Academy of Medicine in 1840 and to the Academy of Sciences in 1856.

Jobert was a brilliant and resourceful operator, best known for his masterly use of autoplastie, the repair of diseased parts by healthy neighboring tissue, and especially for the operation which he styled élitroplastie, an autoplastic cure of vaginal fistula. He wrote:

- Traité théorique et pratique des maladies chirurgicales du canal intestinal (1829)
- Etudes sur le système nerveux (1838)
- Traité de chirurgie plastique (1849)
- De la réunion en chirurgie (1864)

== Terms ==
- Jobert's fossa – the fossa in the popliteal region bounded above by the adductor magnus and below by the gracilis and sartorius; best seen when the knee is bent and the thigh strongly rotated outward
- Jobert's operation – autoplastic closure of as vesicovaginal fistula
- Jobert's suture – an interrupted suture of various kinds for a divided intestine, the upper end being invaginated into the lower.

== See also ==
- Dorland's Medical Dictionary
- Antoine Joseph Jobert de Lamballe 1799–1867, Chirurgie, Volume 124, Issue 1, February 1999, Pages 87–94
