= Gaisberg (Heidelberg) =

Coordinates: 49°46′N 9°34′E

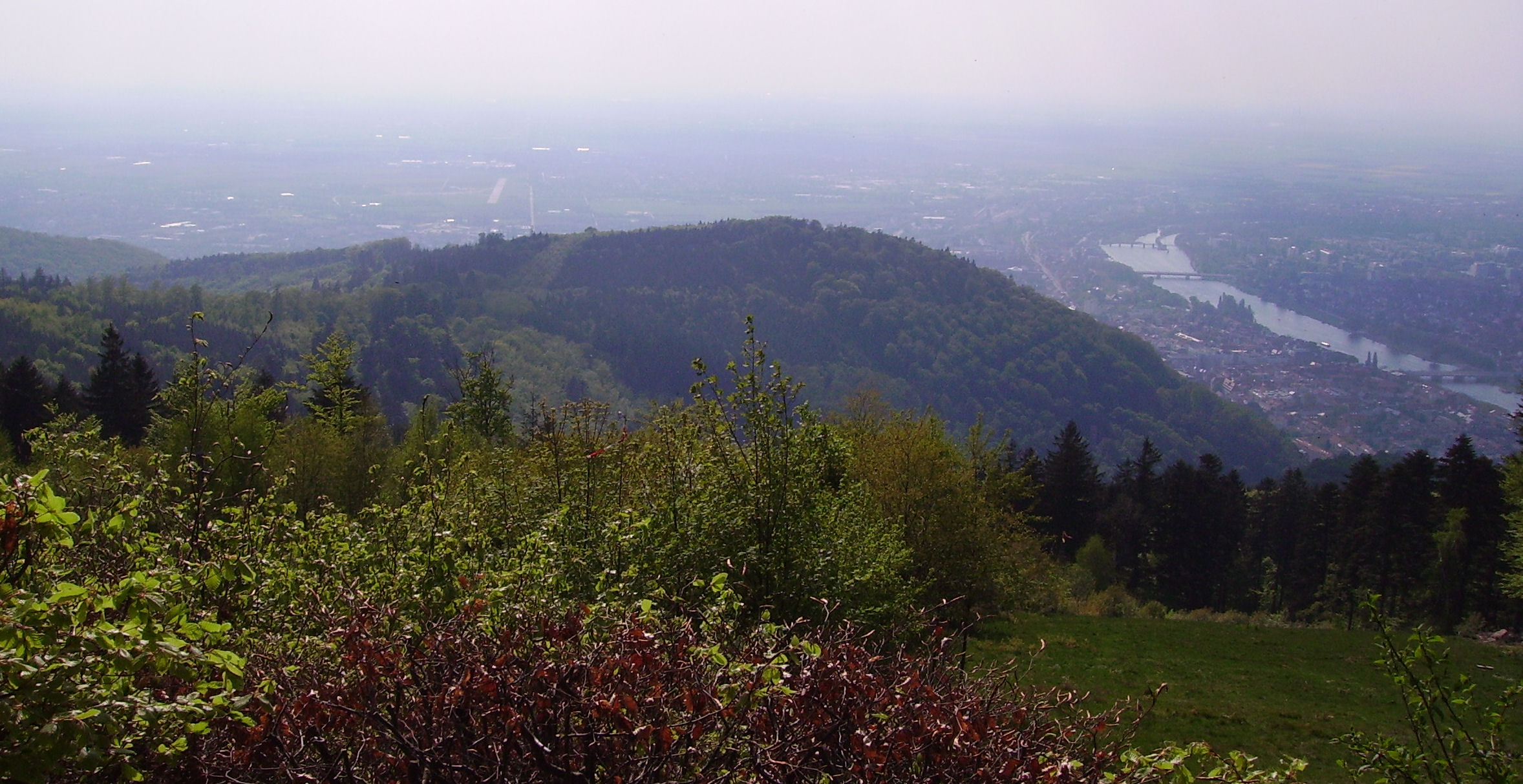
- View onto Gaisberg from the top of Königsstuhl

Highest point
- Elevation: 376 m (1,234 ft)

Geography
- Location: Baden-Württemberg, Germany

Gaisberg (Heidelberg) is a mountain of Baden-Württemberg, Germany. In the 17th century, Matthäus Merian (1593–1650) depicted the Gaisberg as almost completely treeless. Today it is mostly covered in dense deciduous forest and rises above the western part of Heidelberg's old town and the adjoining western town on the edge of the Upper Rhine plain.

== Gallery ==
Gaisberg in Heidelberg (Germany)

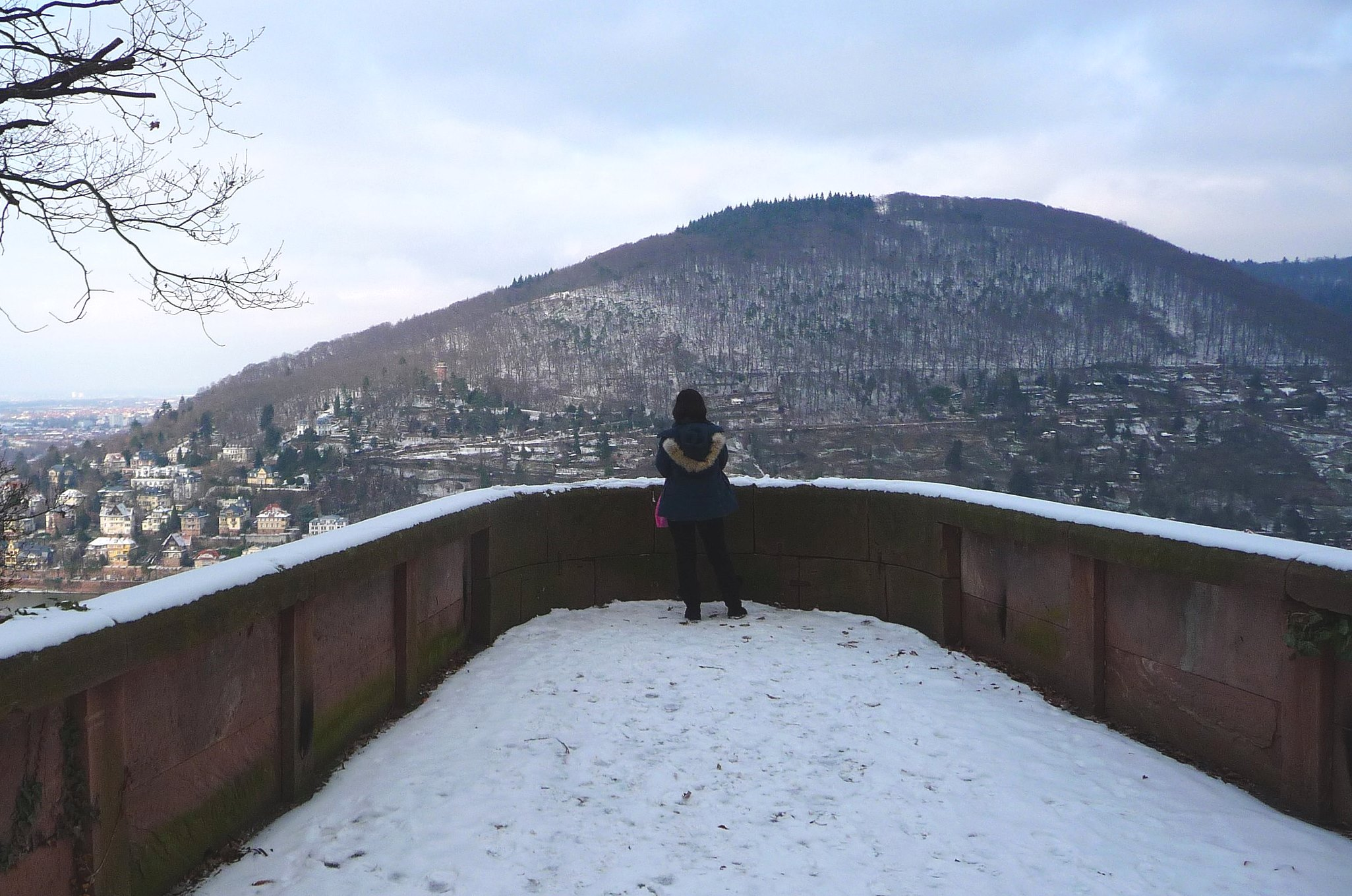
Viewing balcony at Riesenstein on Gaisberg above Heidelberg's old town.

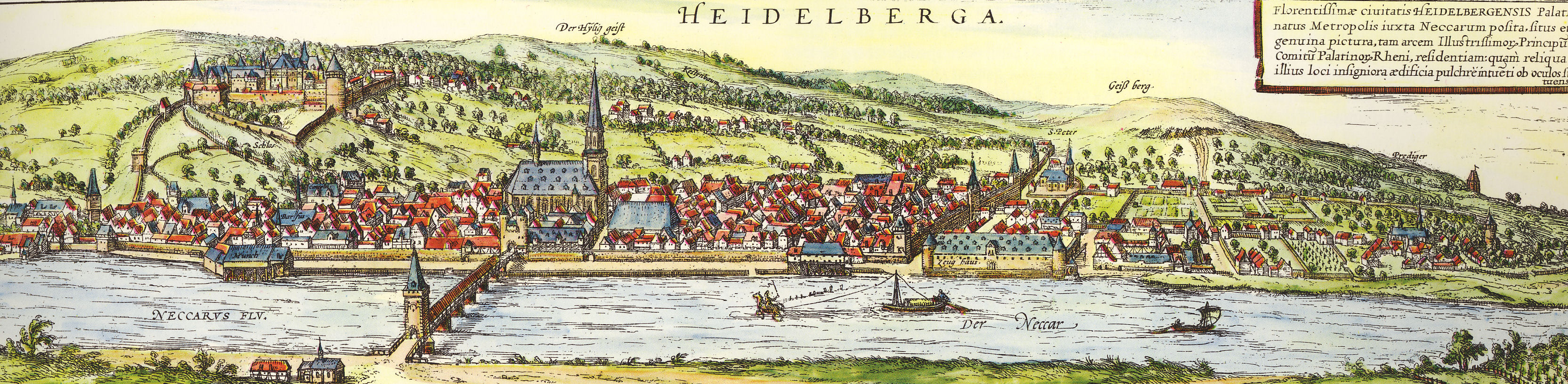
Historic sight of Heidelberg
