= Eight Stone Lions =

Set of sculptures by Paul Kupper

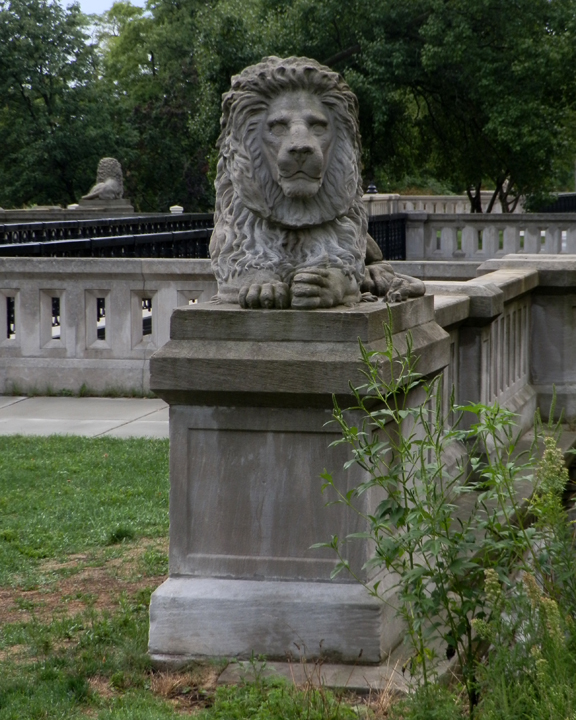
- Artist: Paul Kupper
- Year: 1897
- Dimensions: 36 cm × 30 cm × 65 cm (14 in × 12 in × 26 in)
- Location: Lake Park South end, Milwaukee; 43°3′55.204″N 87°52′15.526″W

Eight Stone Lions is a set of Bedford limestone or sandstone sculptures by Paul Kupper (?-1908) located in Lake Park in Milwaukee, Wisconsin, United States.

== Description ==
Eight Stone Lions features eight lions placed at the ends of two bridges. Each lion is signed and dated P. Kupper. Eight Stone Lions is an outdoor sculpture, and therefore a public art piece. The lions are approximately 36 x 30 x 65 inches and their bases are approximately 54 x 36 x 70 inches.

== History ==
Henry Clay Payne donated Eight Stone Lions to the city of Milwaukee. They were placed to guard each end of the two iron bridges in Lake Park. "The bridges were designed by local engineer Oscar Sanne to cross the two branches of the south ravine on either side of the lighthouse, carrying carriage and pedestrian traffic in and out of Lake Park, the original southern entrance to the park. The drive curned north from Park Avenue (now Wahl Avenue) along the bluff overlooking the lake."

On November 1, 1897, the sculptures were dedicated at Lake Park, Milwaukee's first planned public park, which was designed by Frederick Law Olmsted. A popular Sunday activity at this time was to take the streetcar to Lake Park, where families would stroll, picnic and listen to a band concert.

== Artist ==
Paul Kupper designed two plaster lion casts, which Otto Lachmund, a stonecutter, then cast and carved under Kupper's direction. Kupper was living in Milwaukee during the 1890s, but had moved to California after 1904. Kupper also created a 1,200 pound badger cast, which is now on display at the State Capitol in Madison, Wisconsin.

== Condition ==
Eight Stones Lions was surveyed in April 1993 and found to need treatment. In 2014, a truck driver, supposedly following his GPS, mistook the pedestrian path for a road and attempted to drive across the two Lion Bridges. The truck became wedged into the second bridge, and parts of the bridges were damaged, but the lions were not harmed.
