= North Point Light =

North Point Lighthouse Museum
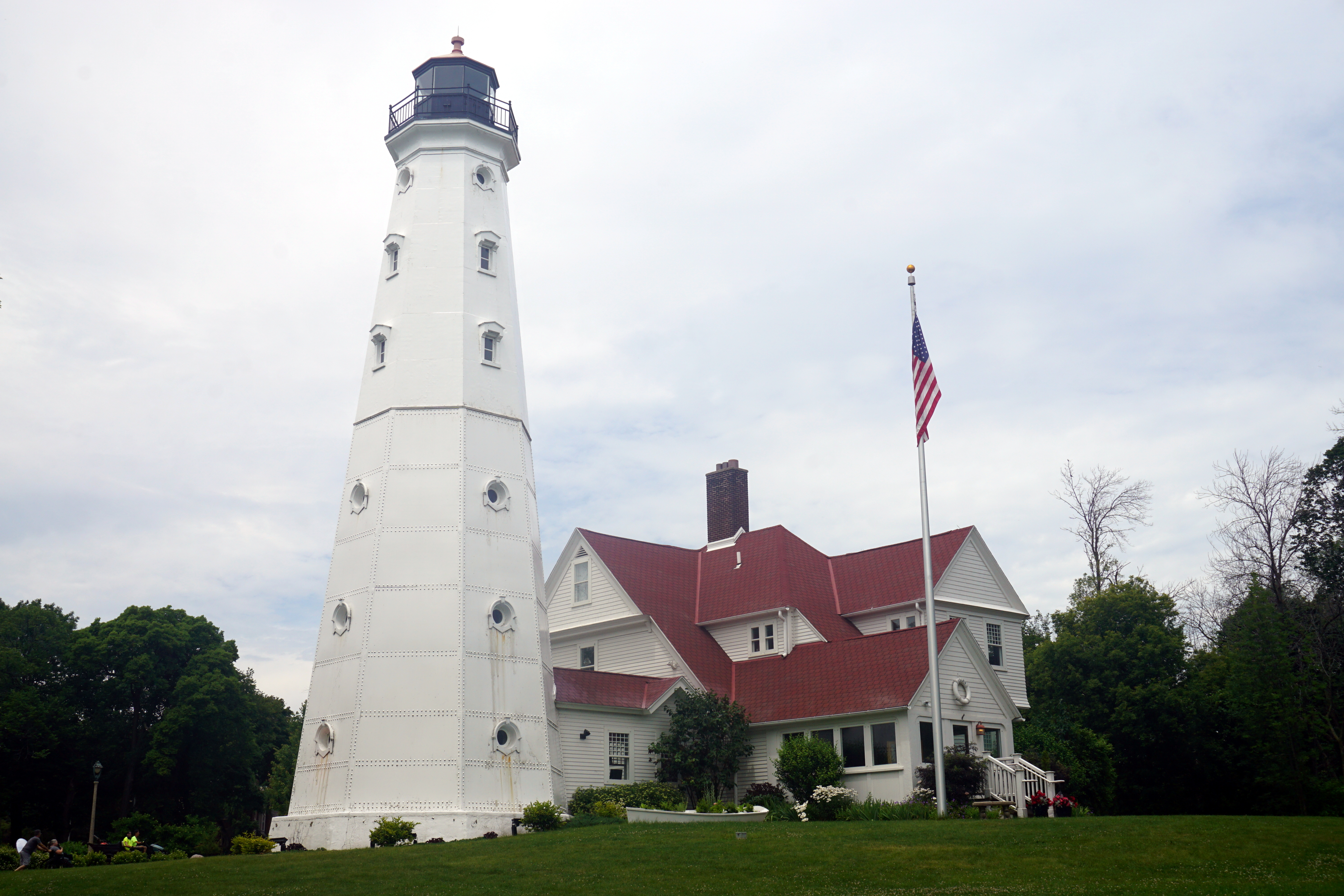
- The lighthouse in 2022
- Location: Milwaukee, Wisconsin
- Coordinates: 43°03′56″N 87°52′17″W

Tower
- Foundation: Concrete
- Construction: Cast Iron (1888) / Steel (1912)
- Height: 74 feet (23 m)
- Shape: Octagonal
- Heritage: National Register of Historic Places listed place

Light
- First lit: 1888
- Deactivated: 1994
- Focal height: 47 m (154 ft)
- Lens: Fourth order Fresnel lens
- North Point Lighthouse Museum
- U.S. National Register of Historic Places
- Area: 2 acres (0.81 ha)
- Built: 1888
- MPS: U.S. Coast Guard Lighthouses and Light Stations on the Great Lakes TR
- NRHP reference No.: 84003732
- Added to NRHP: July 19, 1984

The North Point Lighthouse
An audio description of the lighthouse and its history

The North Point Lighthouse Museum is a lighthouse built in 1888 in Lake Park on the East Side of Milwaukee in Milwaukee County, Wisconsin, United States to mark the entrance to the Milwaukee River. The lighthouse was added to the National Register of Historic Places in 1984. It was also added to the Library of Congress Historic American Buildings Survey as survey HABS WI-358.

== History ==
The first lighthouse on this bluff was built in 1855, a structure of Cream City brick with a cast iron lantern room, sited high to make it visible out on Lake Michigan. In the late 1880s it was jeopardized by erosion of the bluff and plans were made to replace it.

In 1888 a 40-foot cast-iron lighthouse tower was built 100 feet in from the edge of the bluff, and the Queen Anne-style light keeper's quarters was built. The original 1855 lantern room was used on the new 1888 tower. Eventually trees in the park obstructed the light from the view of ships, so in 1912 the tower was dismantled and a riveted steel addition was erected and the original 1888 section was placed on top raising its height to 74 feet (23 m) and light focal plane to 154 feet (47 m). Today, it is the only lighthouse in the country built of three separate lighthouses: the 1855, 1888, and 1912 ones.

The first 1888 lantern burned mineral oil. It was converted to coal gas in 1912 and electrified in 1929. The lens focused a 1,300,000 candlepower signal visible for 25 miles (40 km). The Coast Guard decommissioned the lighthouse in 1994. In 2003 Milwaukee County leased the lighthouse and keepers quarters to the North Point Lighthouse Friends and they began restoration of the tower and keepers quarters. A $984,000 grant was used to restore the light station and it re-opened to the public as a maritime museum in 2007.

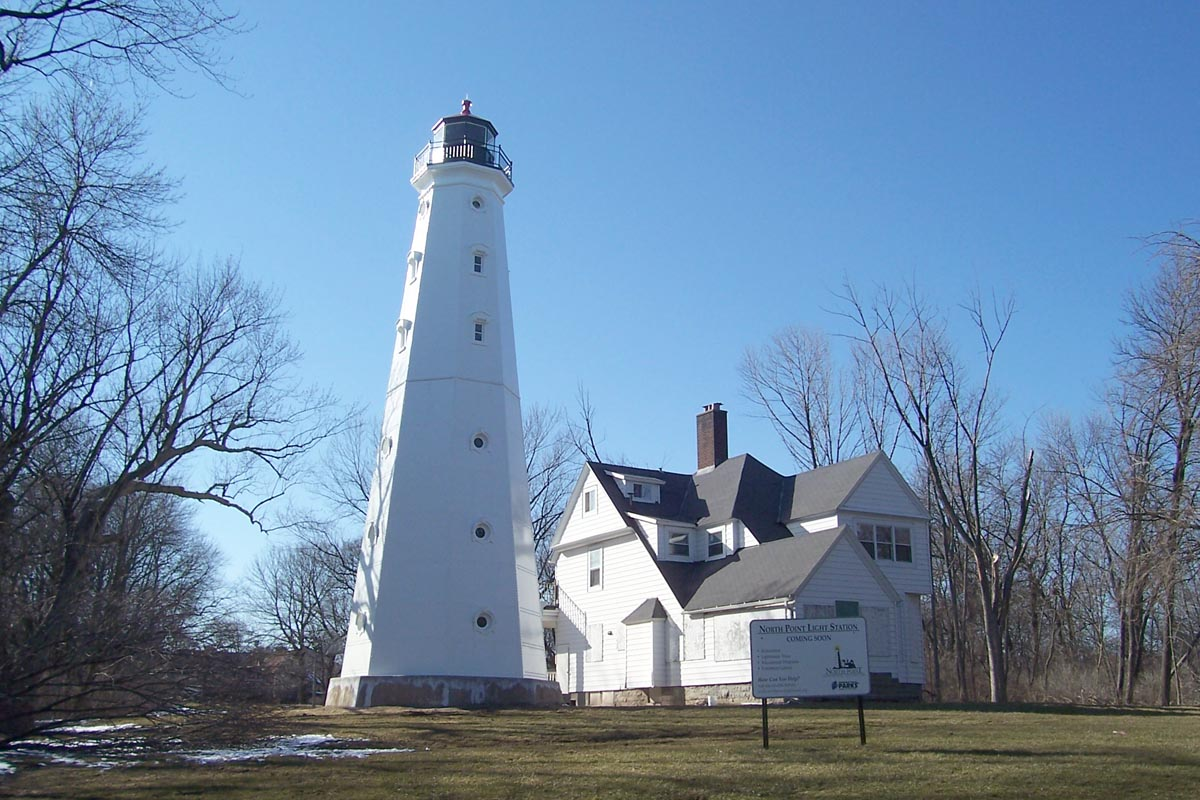
Under renovation in 2006

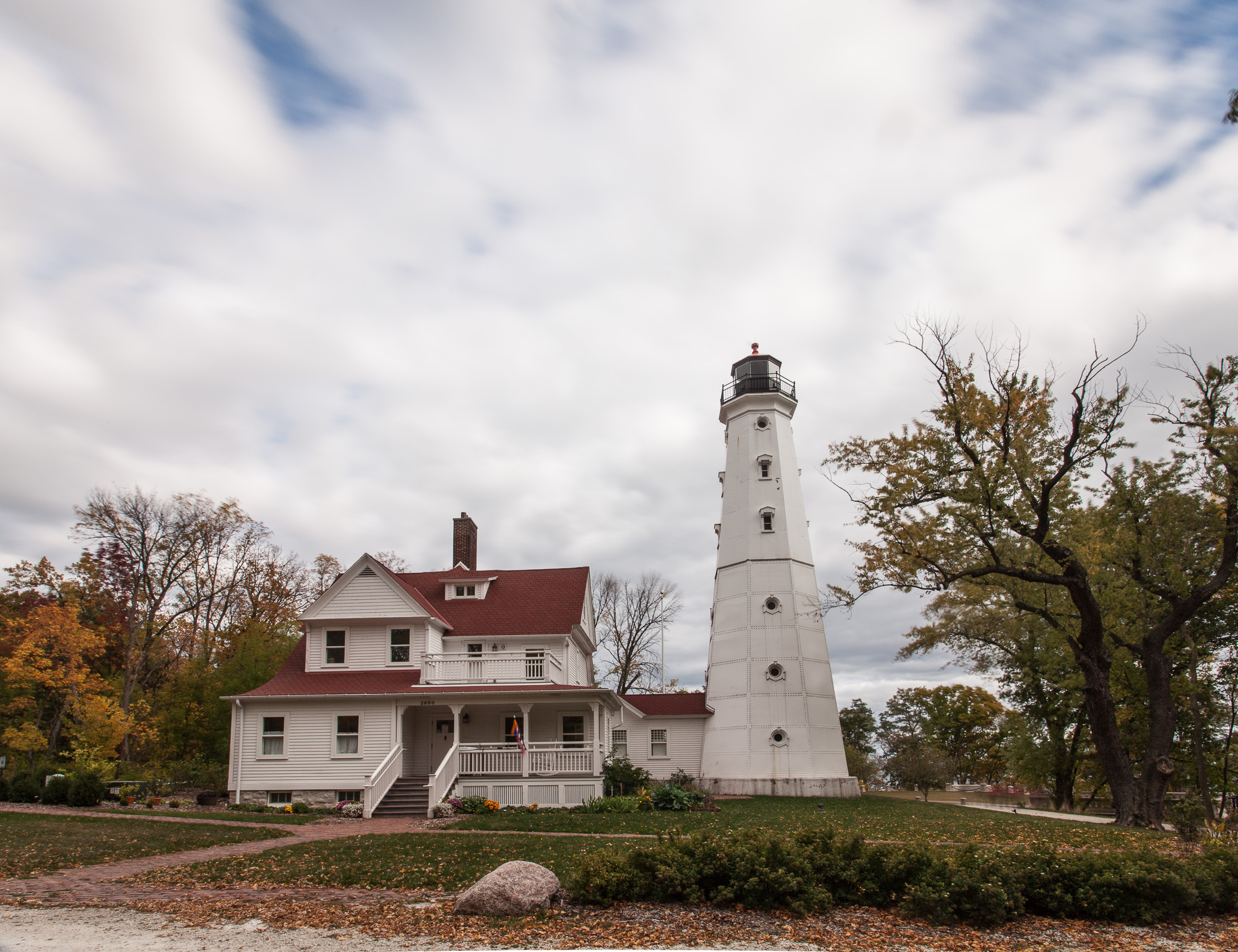
2012 photo

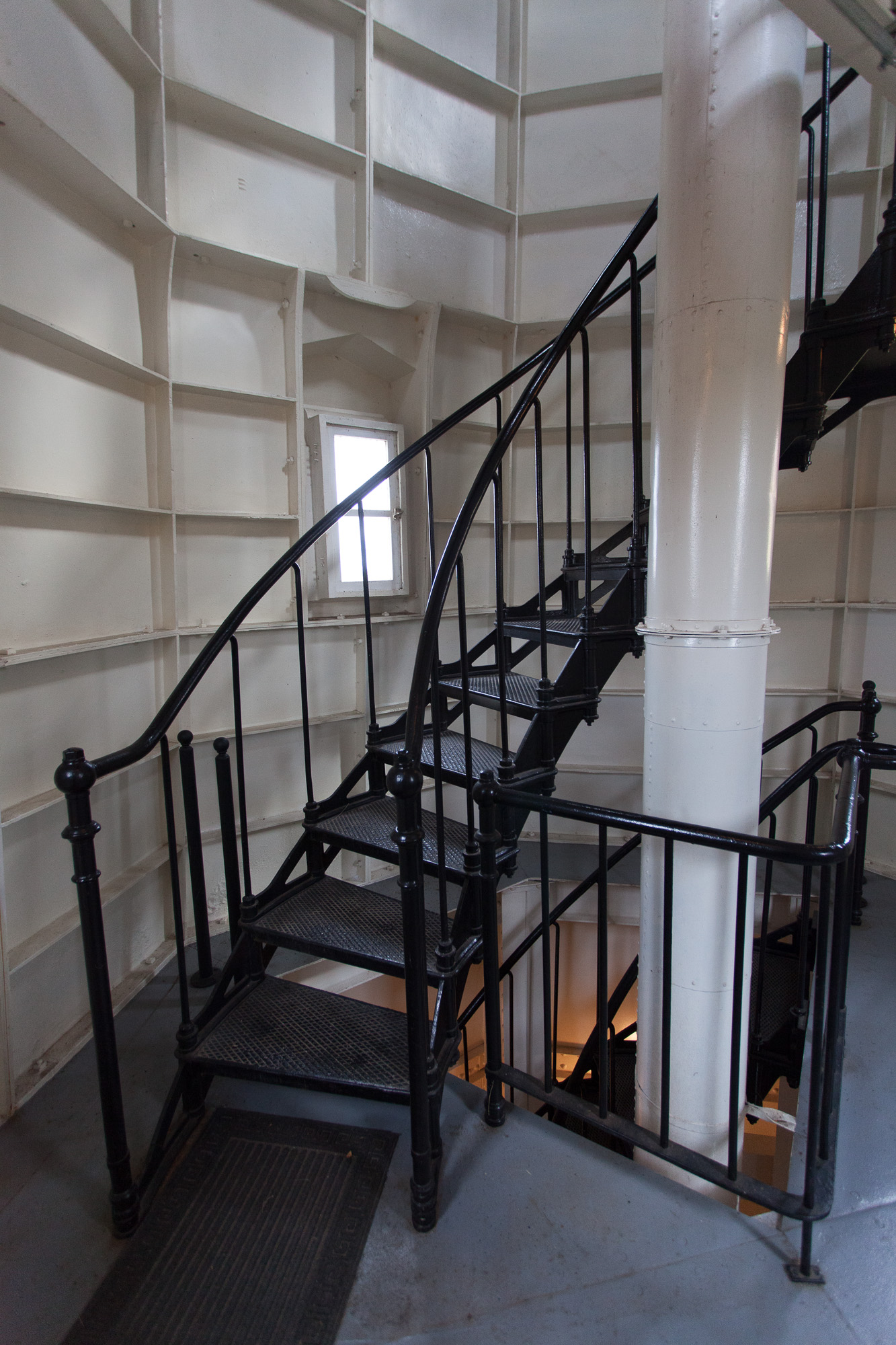
Stairs to tower

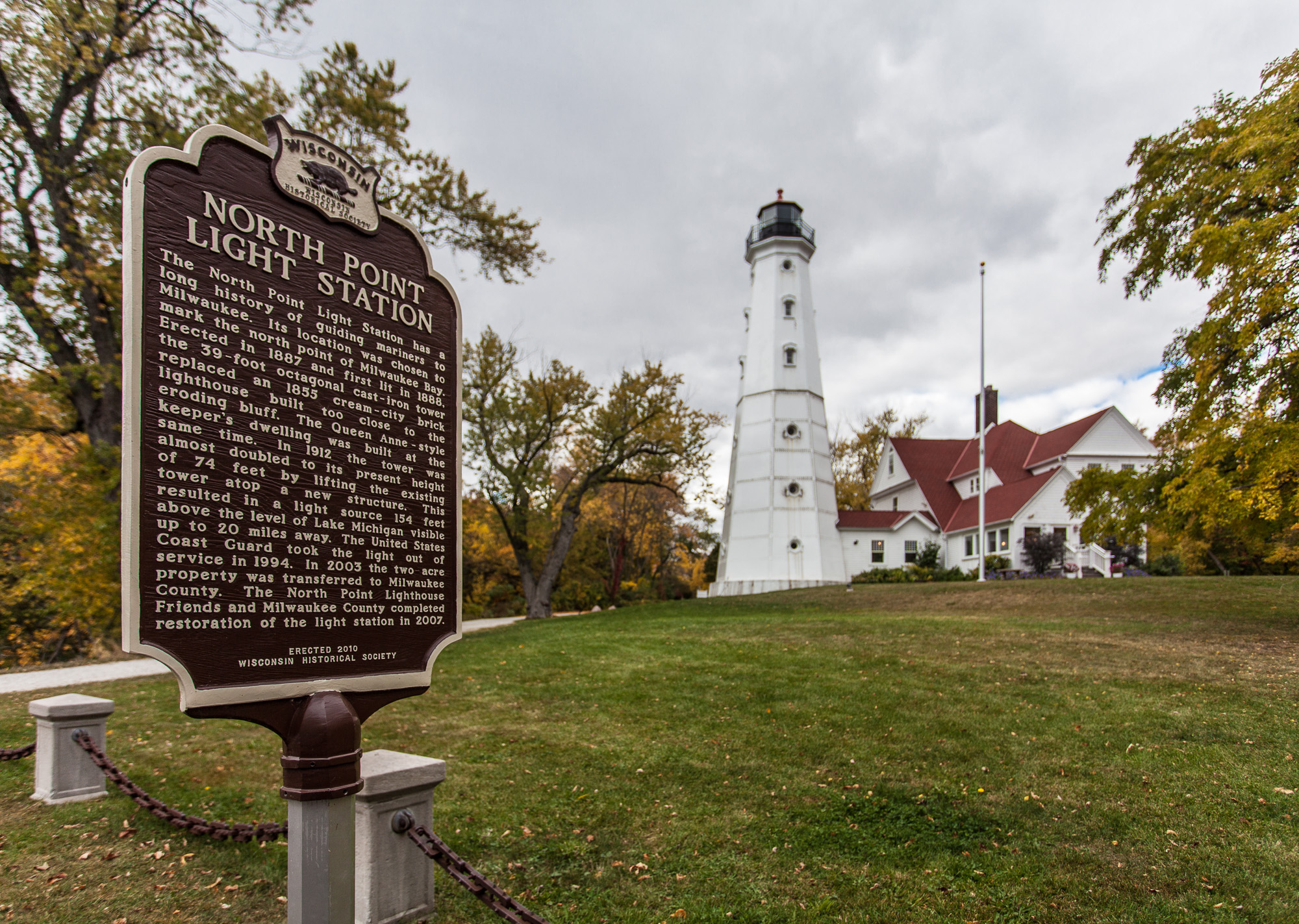
Plaque

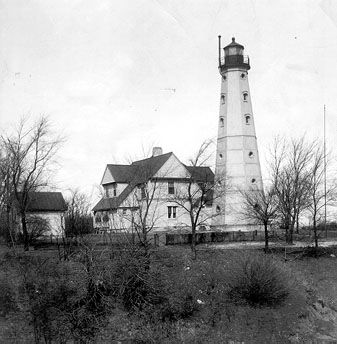
USCG archive photo

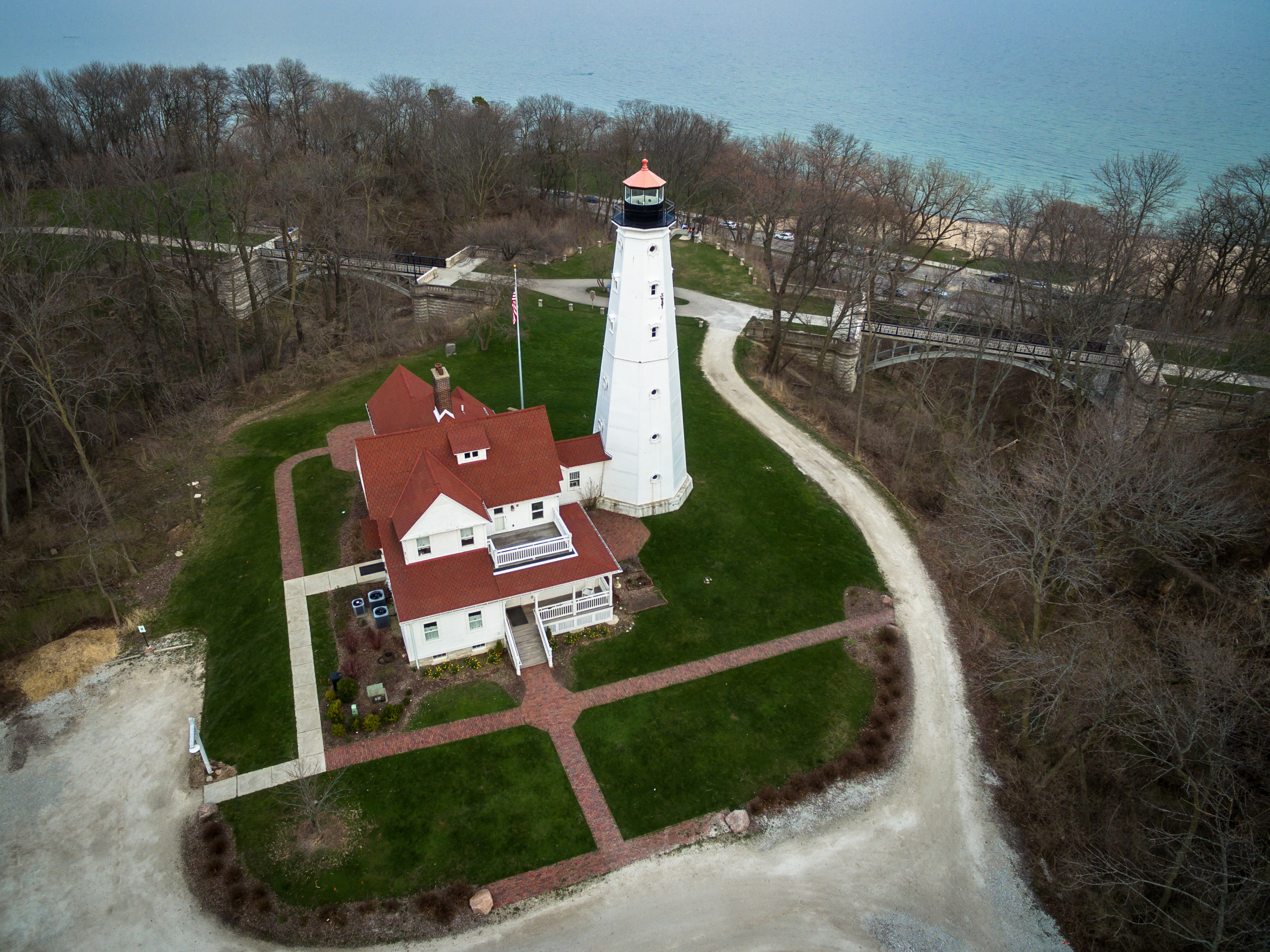
2016 Aerial View

== See also ==
- Lighthouses in the United States
- Parks of Milwaukee
