= McKinley Marina =

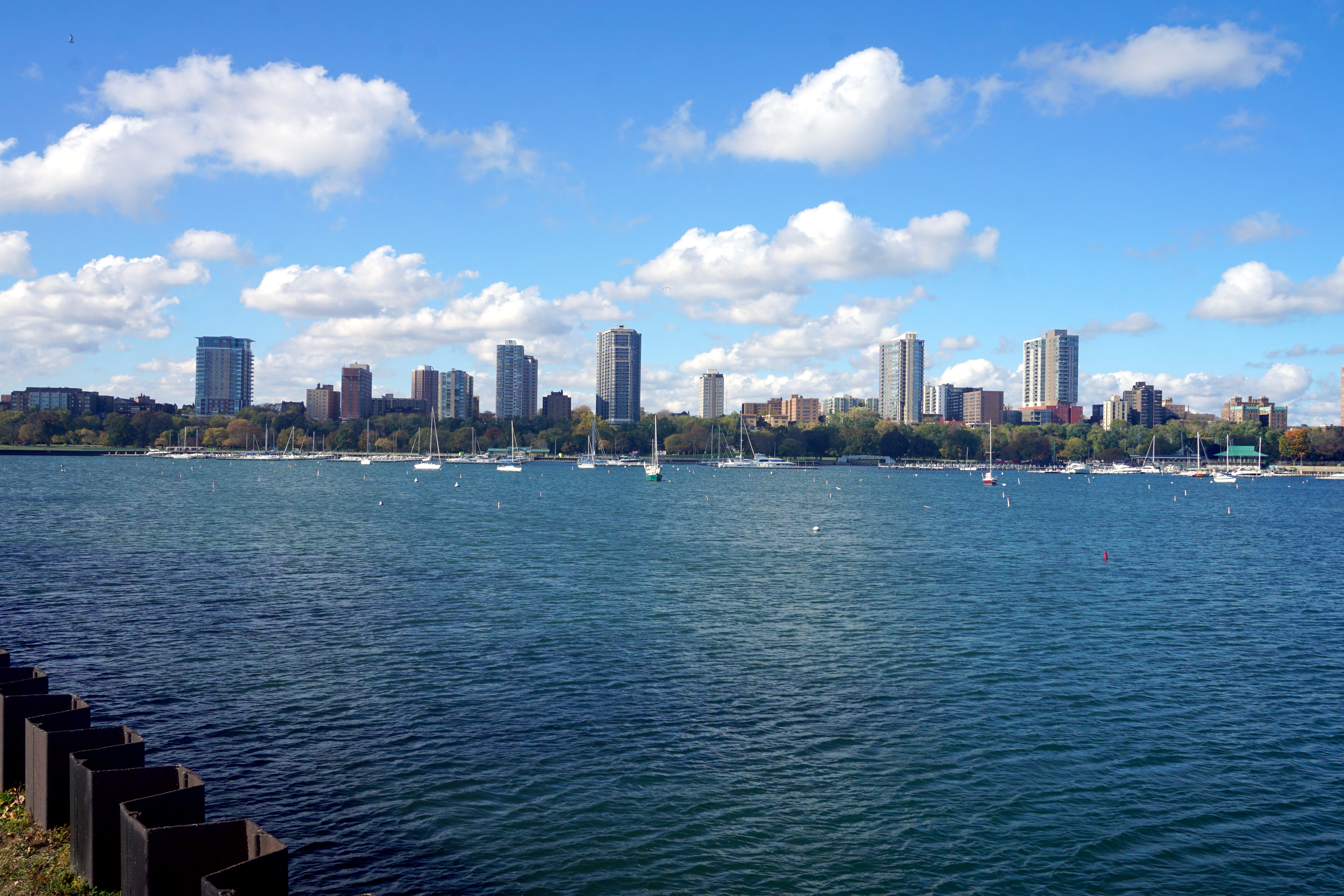
- McKinley Marina
- Interactive map of McKinley Marina
- Location in USA

Location
- Country: United States
- Location: Lake Michigan, Milwaukee, Wisconsin
- Coordinates: 43.049569°N 87.885609°W

Details
- Type of harbour: Public marina

The McKinley Marina is the only public marina in Milwaukee, Wisconsin, on Lake Michigan. Run by Milwaukee County, the facility is just north of Veteran's Park, at the north end of the Milwaukee harbor breakwater. The marina is open from May 1 to October 31.

McKinley Marina has 655 slips with floating docks for rental.
