= List of hospitals in Vermont =

This is a list of hospitals in the U.S. state of Vermont, sorted by founding date.

== Current ==
Founded	Hospital	City	County	Beds	Notes
1834	Brattleboro Retreat	Brattleboro	Windham	113	
1879	University of Vermont Medical Center	Burlington	Chittenden	620	
1896	Rutland Regional Medical Center	Rutland City	Rutland	144	
1903	Gifford Medical Center	Randolph	Orange	25	
1904	Brattleboro Memorial Hospital	Brattleboro	Windham	61	
1914	Springfield Hospital	Springfield	Windsor	35	
1918	Southwestern Vermont Medical Center	Bennington	Bennington	99	
1919	North Country Hospital	Newport City	Orleans	25	
1925	Porter Medical Center	Middlebury	Addison	45	
1932	Copley Hospital	Morrisville	Lamoille	25	
1933	Mount Ascutney Hospital	Windsor	Windsor	35 (25 acute, 10 inpatient rehab)	Operated out of the Thomas Emerson-Edwin Stoughton House in the Windsor Village Historical District from its founding in 1933 until 1972 when the current building was built.
1938	White River Junction VA Medical Center	White River Junction	Windsor	74	
1949	Grace Cottage Hospital	Townshend	Windham	19	
1968	Central Vermont Medical Center	Berlin	Washington	122	Founded in 1968 following the merger of the Heaton Hospital in Montpelier, the Barre City Hospital in Barre and the Mayo Memorial Hospital in Northfield.
1972	Northeastern Vermont Regional Hospital	St. Johnsbury	Caledonia	75	Opened in 1972 following the merger of St. Johnsbury's two former hospitals, the St. Johnsbury Hospital and the Brightlook Hospital.
1978	Northwestern Medical Center	St. Albans City	Franklin	53	Founded in 1978 following the merger of the old St. Albans Hospital and the Kerbs Memorial Hospital Hospital, though the St. Albans Hospital's services wouldn't be fully consolidated until 1996. Built on the former site of the Kerbs Memorial Hospital.
2014	Vermont Psychiatric Care Hospital	Berlin	Washington	25	Built as a replacement for the Vermont State Hospital in Waterbury, which closed in 2011 due to flooding from Tropical Storm Irene.

== Former ==
Founded	Closed	Hospital	City	County	Beds	Notes
1883	1996	St. Albans Hospital	St. Albans	Franklin		Merged with the Kerbs Memorial Hospital also in St. Albans in 1978 and formed the Northwestern Medical Center. However, the St. Albans Hospital remained open until 1996 when it was completely consolidated with the Northwestern Medical Center and the building was purchased by Bellows Free Academy for one dollar, plus the cost of land.
1891	2011	Vermont State Hospital	Waterbury	Washington	54	Closed in 2011 due to flooding as a result of Tropical Storm Irene.
1895	1972	St Johnsbury Hospital	St. Johnsbury	Caledonia		Closed in 1972 after it merged with the Brightlook Hospital to form the Northeastern Vermont Regional Hospital.
1896	1973	Proctor Hospital	Proctor	Rutland		First hospital opened in 1896 and was used until 1904. The second hospital building was built in 1904 and was used until it closed in 1973 and was later demolished.
1896	1968	Heaton Hospital	Montpelier	Washington		Closed in 1968 after it merged with the Barre City Hospital and the Mayo Memorial Hospital to form the Central Vermont Medical Center. Has been used as Heaton Woods Residential Care since 1995.
1899	1972	Brightlook Hospital	St. Johnsbury	Caledonia		Closed in 1972 after it merged with the St. Johnsbury Hospital to form the Northeastern Vermont Regional Hospital. The building is now being used as an apartment complex known as the Brightlook Apartments.
circa 1905-1911	?	Melrose Hospital	West Brattleboro	Windham		Operated out of the former Melrose Hotel.
1907	1968	Barre City Hospital	Barre	Washington		Closed in 1968 after it merged with the Heaton Hospital and the Mayo Memorial Hospital to form the Central Vermont Medical Center.
1907	1973	Holden Memorial Hospital	Hardwick	Caledonia		Also known as the John Holden Hospital, the John Holden Memorial Hospital and simply the Hardwick Hospital.
1907	1966	Vermont Sanatorium	Pittsford	Rutland		It was a tuberculosis hospital. It closed in 1966 and the building was repurposed as the Vermont Police Academy in 1971.
1912	1990	Rockingham Memorial Hospital	Bellows Falls	Windham		The first hospital opened in 1912, had 14 beds and was used until 1915. The second hospital opened in 1915, had 25 beds and was used until 1921. The third hospital opened in 1921 and was used until 1953-54. The fourth hospital was built and opened in 1953-54 and was in use until it closed in October 1990. The first and second buildings are still standing and being used as residential homes. The third hospital building was demolished shortly after the fourth one was built. The fourth hospital building became a health clinic known as the Rockingham Health Center until it closed in 2025.
1915	1993	Brandon State School	Brandon	Rutland		A psychiatric school and hospital. Historically known as the Brandon Training School and the Vermont State School for Feeble Minded Children. It closed in 1993 and its campus buildings have since been repurposed into apartments and commercial facilities.
1919	1963	Washington County Tuberculosis Hospital	Barre	Washington	40	Also called the Washington County Sanatorium. It was a tuberculosis hospital.
1923	1973	Caverly Preventorium	Pittsford	Rutland		It was a tuberculosis hospital for children and was adjacent to the Vermont Sanatorium. It was later renamed the Caverly Child Health Center and served as a pediatric nursing home until it closed in 1973. Since 1980, the building has been used by the Pittsford Fire Department for an annual haunted house for Halloween.
1936	1968	Mayo Memorial Hospital	Northfield	Washington	29	It was a osteopathic hospital. It closed in 1968 after it merged with the Barre City Hospital and the Heaton Hospital to form the Central Vermont Medical Center.
1950	1978	Kerbs Memorial Hospital	St. Albans City	Franklin		Closed and demolished in 1978 after it merged with the St. Albans Hospital and formed the Northwestern Medical Center, which sites on the former site of Kerbs Memorial Hospital.
