= Bellows Free Academy =

Bellows Free Academy may refer to:

- Bellows Free Academy, St. Albans
- Bellows Free Academy, Fairfax, Vermont
