= Ted Tunnell =

American historian and author

Ted Tunnell is a history professor and author in the United States. He has taught history at Virginia Commonwealth University. He wrote a book about the Reconstruction era in Louisiana, edited Marshall Twitchell's autobiography, and wrote a book about him. He appears on film in an interview for the show American Experience discussing Twitchell.

In 2010, Tunnell was quoted in an article about a Virginia textbook erroneously stating that many African Americans fought for the Confederacy during the American Civil War stating there were only a handful. Regarding the claim that there were thousands, he stated: "I would say all professional historians at universities would say it's grossly exaggerated."

== Works ==
- Tunnell, Ted (1992). Crucible of Reconstruction: War, Radicalism, and Race in Louisiana, 1862--1877. LSU Press. ISBN 978-0-8071-1803-0.
- Carpetbagger from Vermont: The Autobiography of Marshall Harvey Twitchell, editor, Baton Rouge, 1989
- Edge of the Sword: The Ordeal of Carpetbagger Marshall H. Twitchell in the Civil War and Reconstruction Louisiana State University Press (2000)
- Tunnell, Ted (November 2006). "Creating 'The Propaganda of History': Southern Editors and the Origins of 'Carpetbagger and Scalawag'". The Journal of Southern History. 72 (4): 789–822. doi:10.2307/27649233. JSTOR 27649233.
- Tunnell, Ted (2000). "Warmoth, Henry Clay (1842-1931), Reconstruction governor of Louisiana". American National Biography. doi:10.1093/anb/9780198606697.article.0401035. ISBN 978-0-19-860669-7.
