= Converse Hall (University of Vermont) =

- U.S. National Register of Historic Places
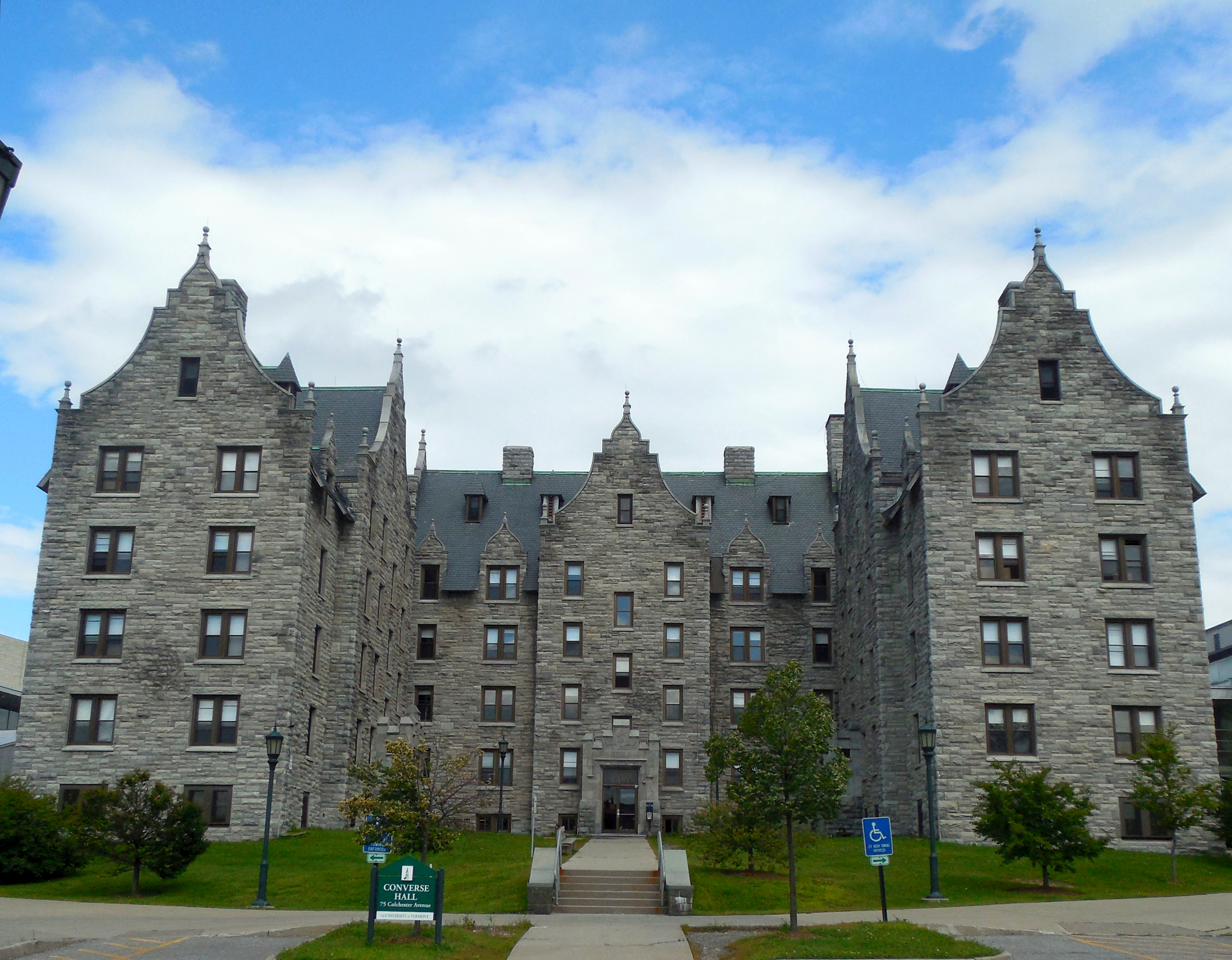

- Location within Vermont Location within the United States
- Location: 75 Colchester Ave., Burlington, Vermont
- Coordinates: 44°28′42″N 73°11′40″W
- Area: less than one acre
- Built: 1895
- Architect: Wilson Brothers & Company
- Architectural style: Chateauesque
- NRHP reference No.: 100006655
- Added to NRHP: June 2, 2021

Converse Hall, built in 1895, is one of the oldest buildings on the campus of the University of Vermont (UVM) in Burlington that has been continuously used as a residential dormitory. A rare example in the state of Chateauesque architecture, it was listed on the National Register of Historic Places in 2021.

== Description and history ==
Converse Hall is located on the east side of the UVM campus, in an area that was somewhat isolated when the hall was built, but is now dominated by the University of Vermont Medical Center to the north. The hall is a U-shaped structure 4 1/2 stories in height, with the opening of the U facing west toward the central campus area. Its exterior is finished in Vermont marble, with sash windows set singly and in pairs in plain rectangular openings. Each wing of the U has projecting sections near the center, which give their roof lines a cruciform appearance. The gable ends are decorated with finials and turrets, and the roofs are dotted with attic and wall dormers that have similarly styled gables.

The hall was built in 1895, during a period of the university's rapid growth (echoing that of the city itself). It was designed by the Wilson Brothers firm of Philadelphia, Pennsylvania, and is one of just a handful of documented Chateau-style buildings in the state, modeled stylistically on French chateaux of the 16th century. It was noted for its architecture at the time of its construction. It has served as a residential dormitory since its construction, except during the two World Wars, when it was converted to barracks use for military trainees. The interior of the building underwent some restyling in the 1920s, and then had major work done in 1974–75, when much of its interior styling was covered over or removed. Its basic interior plan was not changed by these alterations, and fragments of the original and 1926 finishes are still discernible. The building was listed on the National Register for its architecture in 2021.

== See also ==
- National Register of Historic Places listings in Chittenden County, Vermont
