= Alice Hyde =

Alice Hyde may refer to:

- Alice Clary Earle Hyde (1876-1943), American botanical artist and conservationist
- Alice Hyde Medical Center, a medical facility in Malone, New York, United States
