= Northeastern Vermont Regional Hospital =

Coordinates: 44.4457258°N 72.0095754°W

Geography
- Location: St. Johnsbury, Vermont, United States

Services
- Emergency department: Yes
- Beds: 75

History
- Founded: 1972

Links
- Website: https://www.nvrh.org/
- Lists: Hospitals in Vermont

Northeastern Vermont Regional Hospital is a community, not for profit, acute care, critical access hospital located in St. Johnsbury, Vermont. It opened in 1972 following the merger of St. Johnsbury's two former hospitals, the St. Johnsbury Hospital and the Brightlook Hospital. It is designated as a Baby Friendly hospital by the United Nations. It provides primary and preventive care, surgical and specialty services, inpatient and outpatient care and 24-hour emergency services.
