= Harmonyville, Vermont =

Census-designated place in Vermont, United States

- Census-designated place
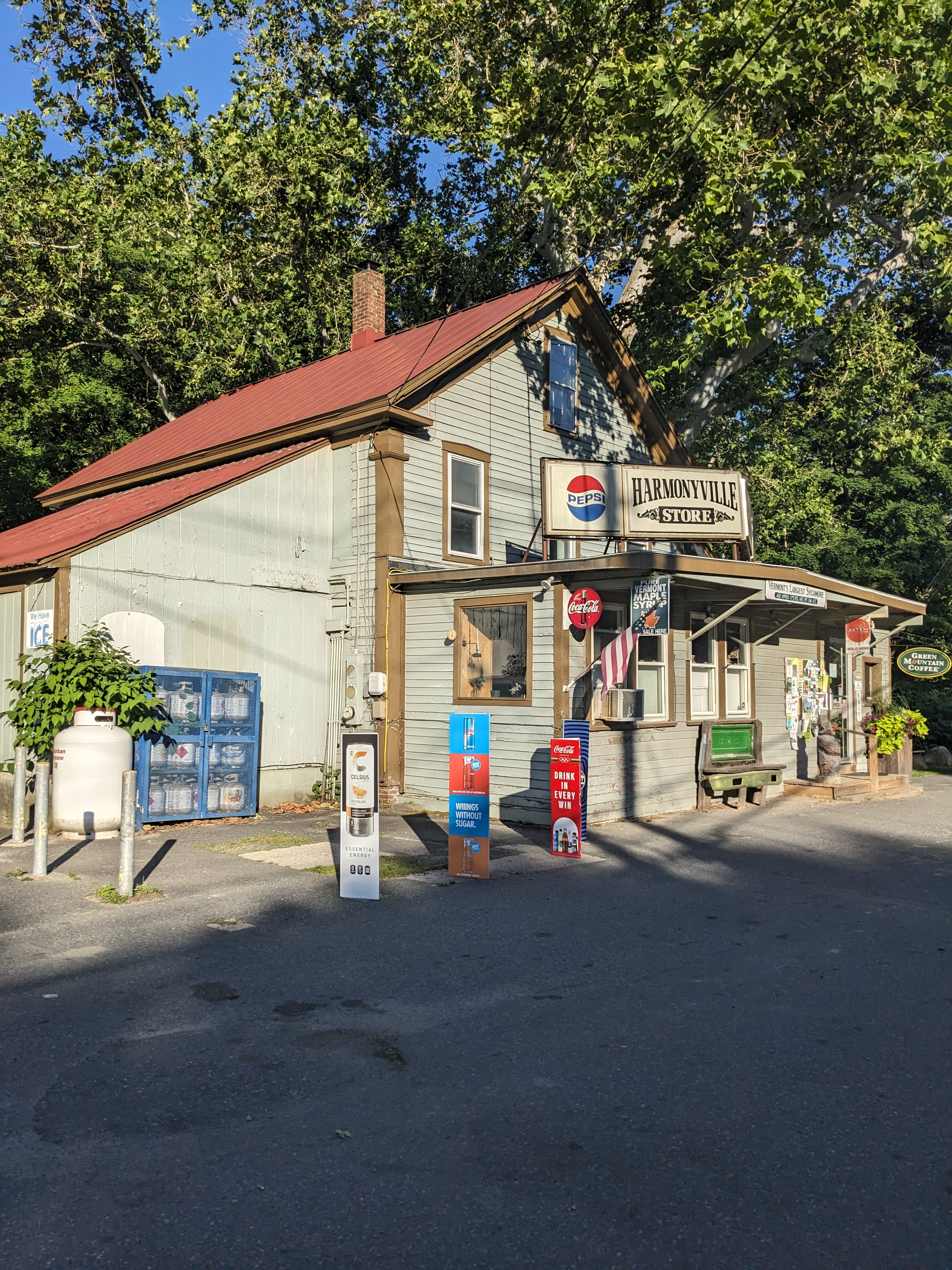
- Store in Harmonyville, Vermont

- Location within Vermont Location within the United States
- Coordinates: 43°02′14″N 72°39′57″W
- Country: United States
- State: Vermont
- County: Windham
- Town: Townshend

Area
  - Total: 0.33 sq mi (0.86 km^{2})
  - Land: 0.33 sq mi (0.85 km^{2})
  - Water: 0.0039 sq mi (0.01 km^{2})
- Elevation: 440 ft (130 m)

Population (2020)
  - Total: 92
- Time zone: UTC-5 (Eastern (EST))
  - Summer (DST): UTC-4 (EDT)
- ZIP Code: 05353 (Townshend)
- Area code: 802
- FIPS code: 50-32050
- GNIS feature ID: 2807161

Harmonyville is an unincorporated community and census-designated place (CDP) in the town of Townshend, Windham County, Vermont, United States. As of the 2020 census, it had a population of 92.

The CDP is in north-central Windham County, in the southern part of the town of Townshend. It is bordered to the north by the village of Townshend. It sits in the valley of the West River, where it is joined from the northeast by Mill Brook. The West River is a southeast-flowing tributary of the Connecticut River.

Vermont Route 30 passes through the community, leading southeast 16 miles (26 km) to Brattleboro and northwest through Townshend village 30 miles (48 km) to Manchester Center.
