= Townshend (CDP), Vermont =

Census-designated place in Vermont, United States

Townshend, Vermont
- Census-designated place
- Location within Vermont Location within the United States
- Coordinates: 43°02′49″N 72°40′09″W
- Country: United States
- State: Vermont
- County: Windham
- Town: Townshend

Area
  - Total: 0.35 sq mi (0.91 km^{2})
  - Land: 0.35 sq mi (0.90 km^{2})
  - Water: 0 sq mi (0.0 km^{2})
- Elevation: 571 ft (174 m)

Population (2020)
  - Total: 199
- Time zone: UTC-5 (Eastern (EST))
  - Summer (DST): UTC-4 (EDT)
- ZIP Code: 05353
- Area code: 802
- FIPS code: 50-73225
- GNIS feature ID: 2807165

Townshend is the primary village and a census-designated place (CDP) in the town of Townshend, Windham County, Vermont, United States. As of the 2020 census, it had a population of 199, compared to 1,291 in the entire town.

== Geography ==
The CDP is in north-central Windham County, in the south-central part of the town of Townshend. It sits in an elevated valley to the east of the West River, a southeast-flowing tributary of the Connecticut River. Mill Brook, a tributary of the West River, forms the eastern edge of the community. The community of Harmonyville borders the Townshend CDP to the south.

Vermont Route 30 passes through the village, leading south 5 miles (8 km) to Newfane and northwest 9 miles (14 km) to Jamaica. Vermont Route 35 has its southern terminus at Route 30 in Townshend; it leads north 14 miles (23 km) to Grafton.
