= Central Vermont Medical Center =

Coordinates: 44.2203°N 72.5608°W

Geography
- Location: Berlin, Vermont, United States

Services
- Emergency department: Full-time
- Beds: 122

History
- Opened: 1968

Links
- Website: http://www.cvmc.org/
- Lists: Hospitals in Vermont

Central Vermont Medical Center (CVMC) is the primary health care provider located in Berlin, Vermont providing care for the people of the central portion of Vermont.

The medical staff numbers 121 physicians including nine community-based medical group practices. CVMC provide 24-hour emergency care, with 122 inpatient beds. CVMC is accredited by the Joint Commission on Accreditation of Healthcare Organizations. CVMC includes Woodridge Nursing Home.

== History ==
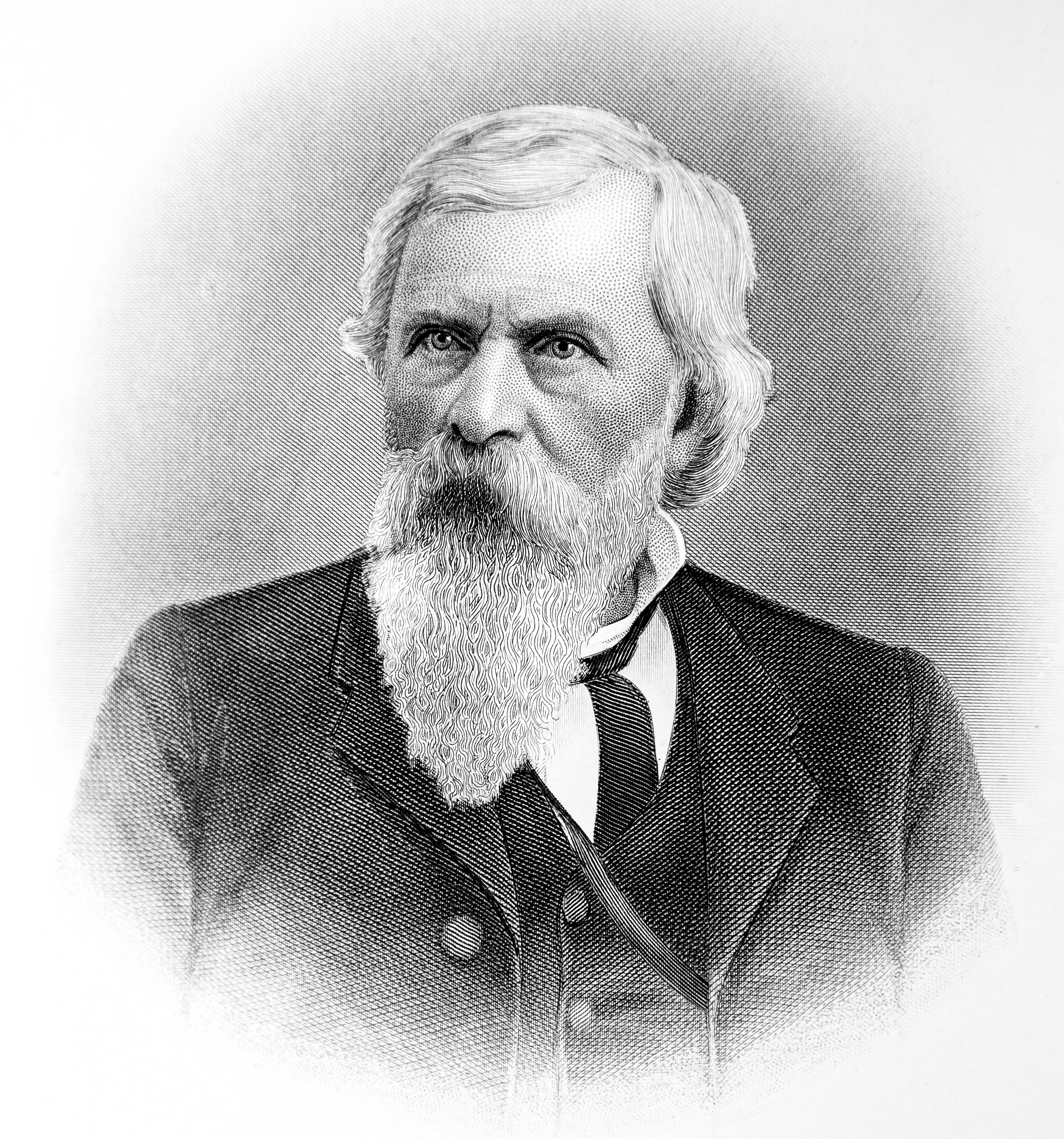
Homer W. Heaton

In 1895, Homer W. Heaton founded Heaton Hospital in Montpelier, Vermont. In the neighboring city of Barre, Frank E. Langley and community leaders built Barre City Hospital in 1907.

In 1961, the Vermont State Health Commission recommended that the two hospitals merge to eliminate duplication of services but continue providing health care to Washington County, Vermont. The medical staff of Mayo Memorial Hospital, a small 29-bed osteopathic hospital located 15 miles to the south in Northfield, also voted to join in the merger. In 1968, Central Vermont Hospital was constructed in Berlin, Vermont, between the two cities.

Now known as Central Vermont Medical Center, CVMC is affiliated with the University of Vermont Health Network, though it maintains an independent Board of Trustees.
