= Old Constitution House =

Historic house in Vermont, United States

- U.S. National Register of Historic Places
- U.S. Historic district – Contributing property
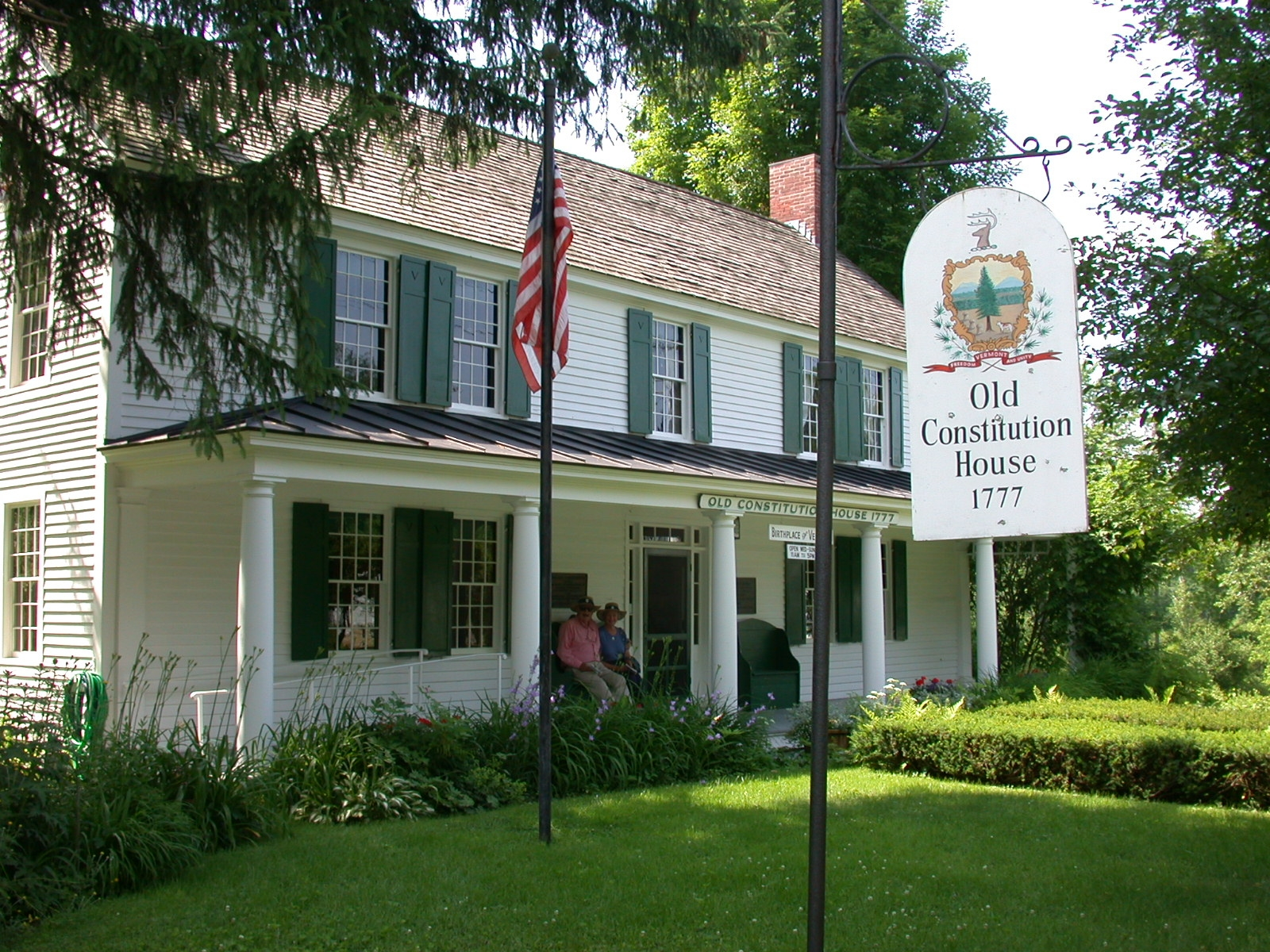
- The Old Constitution House in Windsor, Vermont, where the state's constitution was signed
- Location: 16 N. Main St. Windsor, Vermont
- Coordinates: 43°29′03″N 72°23′8″W
- Website: Old Constitution House
- Part of: Windsor Village Historic District (ID75000212)
- NRHP reference No.: 71000075

Significant dates
- Added to NRHP: March 11, 1971
- Designated CP: April 23, 1975

The Old Constitution House is a historic house at 16 North Main Street in Windsor, Vermont. It is the birthplace of the Vermont Republic and the Constitution of the State of Vermont. A mid-18th-century building built in a simple Georgian architectural style, the Old Constitution House was originally called the Windsor Tavern, and belonged to Elijah West at the time of the signing of the constitution. The house is a Vermont State Historic Site, and is administered by the Vermont Division for Historic Preservation. It is also listed on National Register of Historic Places, separately since March 11, 1971 as well as a part of the Windsor Village Historic District since April 23, 1975.

== History ==
The land presently identified as Vermont had multiple claims upon it in the 18th century. British Royal governors from New Hampshire and New York claimed portions of the area, and settlers from Connecticut and Massachusetts had claimed land and begun settlement. In 1764 British King George III ruled that New York had jurisdiction of the area, even though most of its settlement had taken place under New Hampshire-issued grants. Settlers faced continuing competing claims and demands for tax from both New Hampshire and New York, and exorbitant costs to transfer grants from New Hampshire to New York. The conflict continued and grew, and Ethan Allen and the Green Mountain Boys formed a militia aligned primarily against the New York colony and its governor.

In January 1777 representatives of the grants met in convention at Westminster. The convention declared its independence from all external forces, and adopted the name "New Connecticut." The group reconvened on June 4, 1777, at Windsor, a letter by Dr. Thomas Young of Philadelphia, who supported the attempt of independence, was read. Young urged the adoption of the name "Vermont" and the creation of a constitution for Vermont.

On July 2, 1777, a constitutional convention met in Windsor at Elijah West's tavern. A new constitution, taking inspiration from Benjamin Franklin's constitution for the Commonwealth of Pennsylvania, was drafted. This constitution went further than Pennsylvania's in establishing civil liberties. It became the first constitution in the new world to outlaw slavery and indentured servitude, it provided universal manhood suffrage without requirement of property ownership, and required the free education of its citizens, male and female, at public expense. The constitutional convention continued for several days, hammering out the distribution of powers, the rights of three co-equal branches of government, and the rights of the citizens. During this period the British, under Lieutenant General John Burgoyne captured Fort Ticonderoga, and Mount Independence. Settlers in Vermont's western towns were panicked and began to flee. The American forces in the form of the Continental Army slowed the British advance, giving the Green Mountain Boys time to respond in force.

On the morning of July 8, 1777 news of the British advances had panicked the convention, several called for adjournment and suggested reconvening later. A violent thunderstorm with heavy downpour kept delegates in West's Tavern and the document was completed, and signed. The Vermont Republic was begun, and continued for fourteen years. In 1791 Vermont joined the federal union, becoming the first state admitted after the original thirteen.

== Preserving the Old Constitution House ==
Elijah West's tavern was originally located near the center of town. It continued to function as a tavern until 1848 when it was converted to space for a store and light manufacturing. Around 1870 the house was moved to a side street and became a residential tenement. In 1890 the house was converted to a warehouse.

In 1901 efforts to preserve the Old Constitution House began. In 1911 a group called the Old Constitution House Association was formed towards acquiring and restoring the house. Shortly after the house was donated by its owners, the Fay family, to the association, and property for the house's present location was given by William M. Evarts. By 1914 sufficient funds for the restoration had been raised, and work began under the direction of architect Sheldon Newton.

The Old Constitution House Association continued to operate the house as a museum until 1961 when it transferred ownership to the Vermont Division for Historic Preservation. The house has been restored to approximate a tavern with period rooms showing a tavern room, dining room, tea parlor and guest rooms. Many of the historic items have been donated by descendants of the delegates and by the Daughters of the American Revolution.

== See also ==
- Constitution of the Vermont Republic
- List of the oldest buildings in Vermont
- Vermont Republic
- National Register of Historic Places listings in Windsor County, Vermont
