= Windsor House (Windsor, Vermont) =

- U.S. National Register of Historic Places
- U.S. Historic district – Contributing property
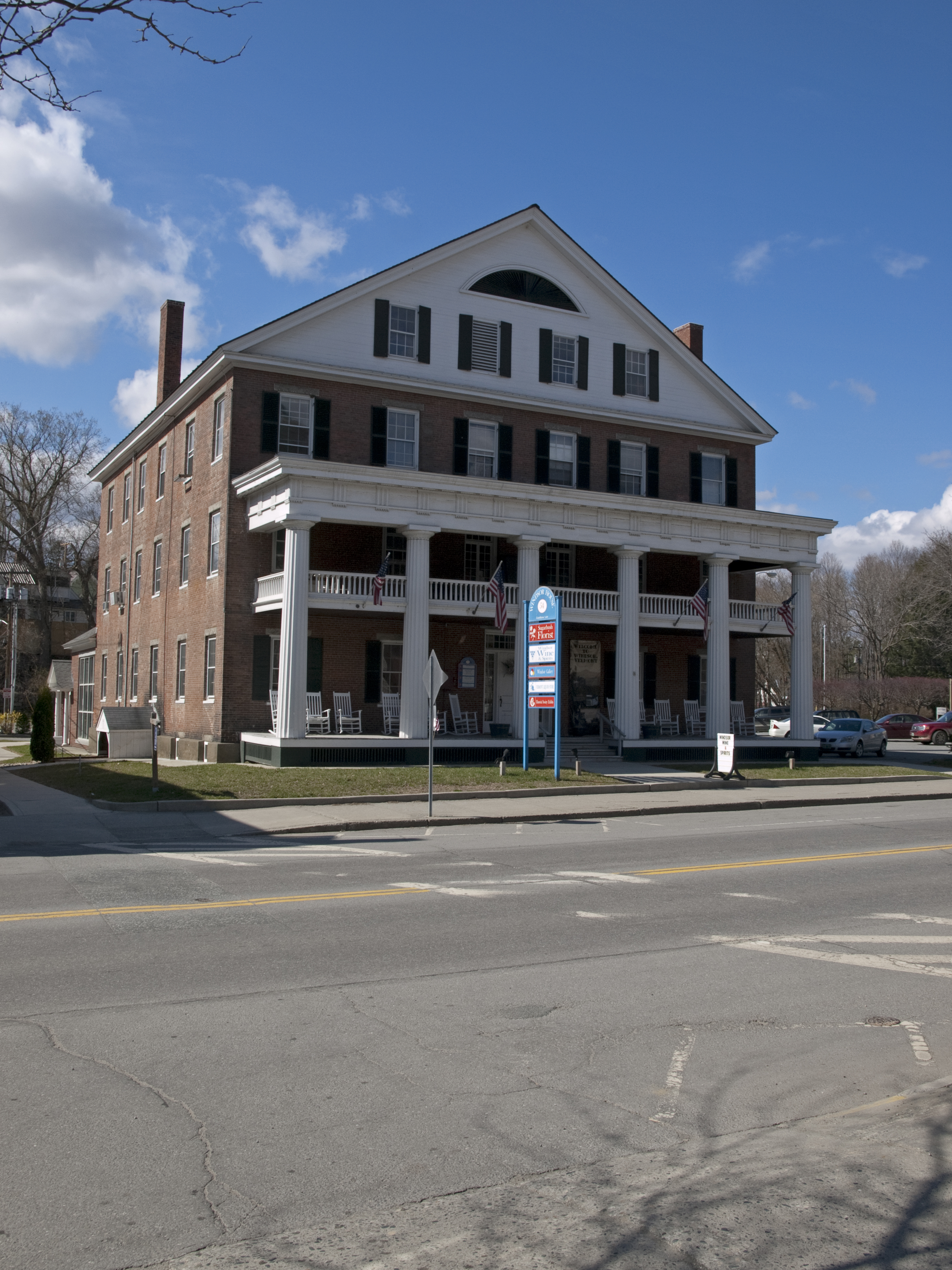

- Location within Vermont Location within the United States
- Location: N. Main St., N of jct. of Main and State Sts., Windsor, Vermont
- Coordinates: 43°28′56″N 72°23′11″W
- Built: 1836
- Part of: Windsor Village Historic District (ID75000212)
- NRHP reference No.: 71000060

Significant dates
- Added to NRHP: December 29, 1971
- Designated CP: April 23, 1975

The Windsor House is a historic former hotel building at 54 Main Street in Windsor, Vermont. Built in 1836, it was for many years a mainstay of the village's travel industry, whose famous guests include Theodore Roosevelt. Now converted to other commercial purposes, the building was listed on the National Register of Historic Places in 1971.

== Description and history ==
The Windsor House stands near the center of Windsor village, on the west side of Main Street north of its junction with State Street. It is a 3 1/2-story brick building, with a gabled roof, and a projecting two-story flat-roofed portico supported by six fluted Doric columns. The front facade is six bays wide, with a four-bay row of windows in the gable, topped by a Federal style fan.

Windsor House was built on the site of an older hostelry, which had itself achieved a measure of renown as a place visited by the Marquis de Lafayette in 1825. The present structure was built in 1836, during a high point in the town's economic prosperity, and served for many years as a prominent hotel, hosting Jenny Lind and other notables. Closed in the early 1970s, it has since been repurposed into a commercial retail space.

Under Innkeeper J. H. Simonds, Windsor House employed a number of freemen - former slaves and the children of former slaves - including Joseph Little, the son of freed slaves Fortune Little and Lorancy Little née Tanner, who worked as a porter at the hotel and Civil War veteran Private Henry Parks of the 54th Massachusetts Infantry Regiment who worked as a groom.

== See also ==
- National Register of Historic Places listings in Windsor County, Vermont
