= Rutland Regional Medical Center =

Coordinates: 43.598062°N 72.955248°W

- Main Campus

Geography
- Location: Rutland, Vermont, United States

Organization
- Type: Community
- Affiliated university: Rutland Regional Health Services

Services
- Emergency department: Yes
- Beds: 144

History
- Opened: 1896

Links
- Website: http://www.rrmc.org/
- Lists: Hospitals in Vermont

Rutland Regional Medical Center is the second largest hospital and the largest community hospital in Vermont. Located in Rutland, Vermont, it opened in 1896.

Rutland Hospital officially opened on September 6, 1896, with four physicians and ten beds. The hospital moved to its current building in 1956 and completed a major addition in 1989. The hospital's name was officially changed to Rutland Regional Medical Center in 1982. The hospital now has a main campus with 144 beds, as well as several other facilities throughout the Rutland region. In fiscal year 2018, Rutland Regional had over 33,000 emergency department visits, 7.000 inpatient admissions, and 300 births.
