= Gifford Medical Center =

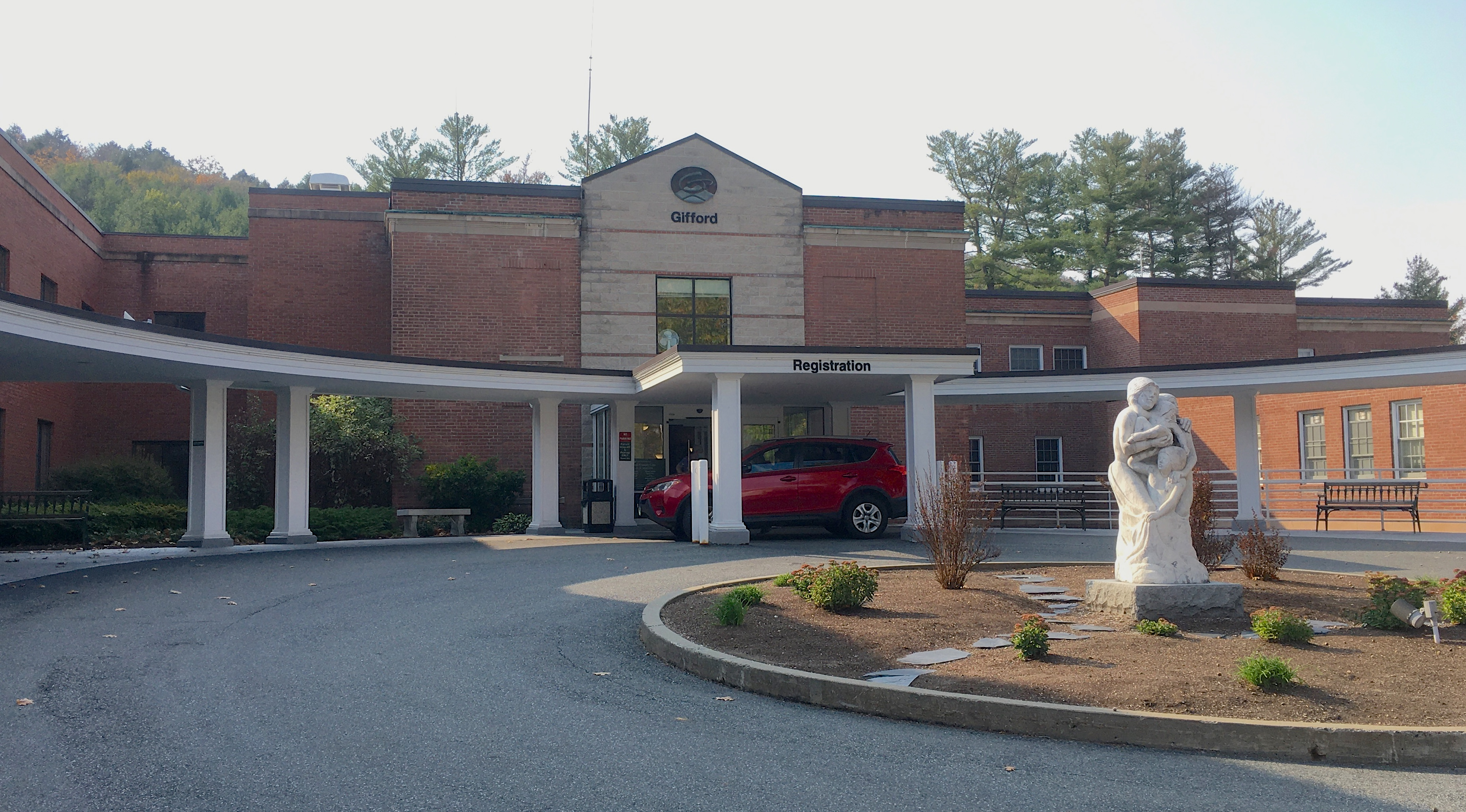

Geography
- Location: 44 South Main, Randolph, Vermont, United States
- Coordinates: 43.916732°N 72.665381°W

Organization
- Type: Critical access hospital

Services
- Beds: 25

Helipads
- Helipad: Yes

History
- Founded: 1903

Links
- Website: http://giffordhealthcare.org/
- Lists: Hospitals in Vermont

Gifford Medical Center is a hospital in Randolph, Vermont. It is a 25-bed Critical Access Hospital and part of the federally qualified health center Gifford Health Care which operates clinics in the nearby towns of Berlin, Bethel, Chelsea, Rochester, Sharon and White River Junction. It also operates a physical therapy practice, a home care agency, and an assisted-living facility. The Chief Medical Officer is Dr. Josh White and the CEO is Dan Bennett. In 2016, Gifford had 700 employees and net assets of about $50 million.

== History ==
Gifford Medical Center began as a private hospital created by Dr. John Gifford. It was originally located in a private home near its current location on South Main Street. A few years later when Dr. Gifford was planning to close the hospital due to the expense, a group of local citizens created a corporation and sold stock to raise money to keep it open. The new institution was called Randolph Sanatorium and Dr. Gifford was the medical director.

== Birthing rooms ==
Gifford is home to the first hospital birthing room in New England. The facility--which allows women to give birth in a non-medical setting with family, and to stay in the room before, during and after birth--opened in 1977. The hospital has five birthing suites, one with a tub for water births, and handles over 200 births per year.
