= Porter Medical Center =

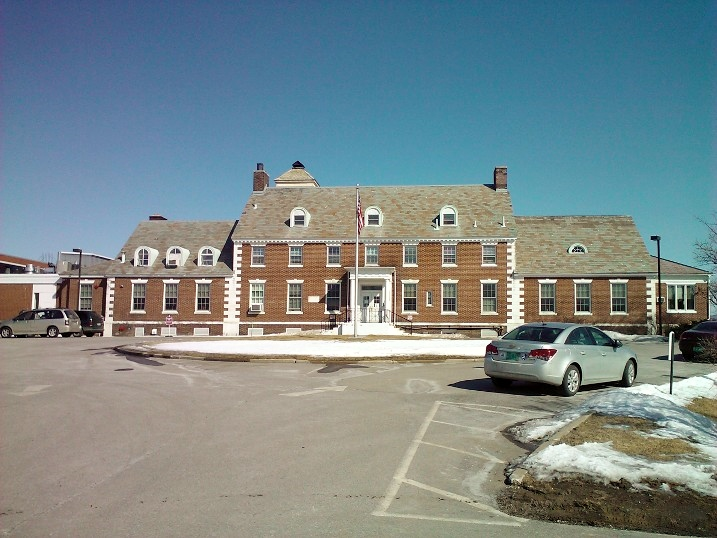

Geography
- Location: 115 Porter Drive, Middlebury, Vermont, United States
- Coordinates: 43.999931°N 73.168709°W

Organization
- Type: Critical access hospital
- Network: University of Vermont Health Network

Services
- Beds: 45

History
- Founded: 1925

Links
- Website: www.portermedical.org
- Lists: Hospitals in Vermont

Porter Medical Center, also known as Porter Hospital, is a 45-bed critical access hospital located in Middlebury, Vermont. Founded by banker William Henry Porter to serve as a dual community hospital and infirmary to nearby Middlebury College, the hospital was dedicated on June 15, 1925. In April 2017, the independent hospital joined the University of Vermont Health Network in an attempt to stabilize Porter's financial situation.
