= Northwestern Medical Center =

Geography
- Location: St. Albans, Vermont, United States
- Coordinates: 44.8077°N 73.0723°W

History
- Opened: 1978; 47 years ago

Links
- Website: www.northwesternmedicalcenter.org
- Lists: Hospitals in Vermont

Northwestern Medical Center is a hospital in St. Albans, Vermont.

== History ==
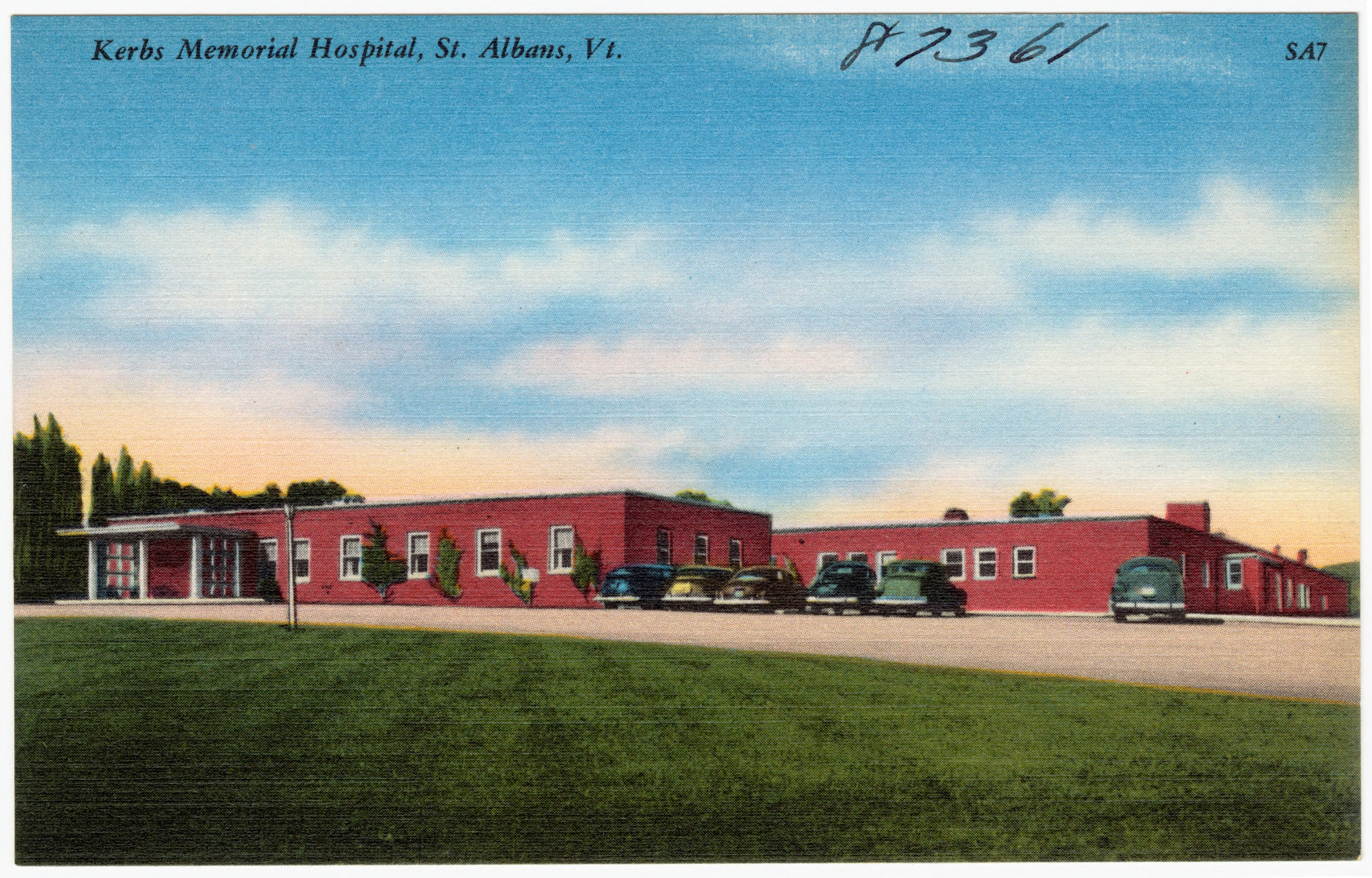
The Kerbs Memorial Hospital (built in 1950) was one of the two former hospitals in St. Albans. The current Northwestern Medical Center currently sits where it used to be.

The St. Albans Hospital, in St. Albans, Vermont, was established in 1883. The Kerbs Memorial Hospital, also in St. Albans, was established in 1950. In 1978, these two hospitals merged into Northwestern Medical Center with it now sitting on the site of the latter. However, the St. Albans Hospital would remain open until 1996 when it was completely consolidated with the Northwestern Medical Center and the building was purchased by Bellows Free Academy for one dollar, plus the cost of land.
