= Grace Cottage Hospital =

Grace Cottage Family Health & Hospital

Geography
- Location: 185 Grafton Road, Townshend, Vermont, United States
- Coordinates: 43.049027°N 72.6681002°W

Organization
- Type: Community

Services
- Emergency department: 24/7/365
- Beds: 19

Helipads
- Helipad: Yes

History
- Founded: 1949

Links
- Website: http://www.gracecottage.org
- Lists: Hospitals in Vermont

Grace Cottage Family Health & Hospital is an independent, non-profit critical access hospital and rural health clinic located in Townshend, Vermont. Founded in 1949, the 19-bed hospital specializes in serving patients with acute, rehabilitative, and palliative care needs. The hospital has a 24/7 emergency department, a diagnostic imaging department, and a full-service laboratory. Grace Cottage Family Health has ten primary care providers, a pediatric nurse practitioner, two psychiatric nurse practitioners, a urologist, and a podiatrist. Physical and Occupational therapists are offered to inpatients and outpatients. The hospital also operates a retail pharmacy, Messenger Valley Pharmacy.
