= North Country Hospital =

Coordinates: 44°57′20.5″N 72°12′2.6″W

- North Country Health Systems

Geography
- Location: Newport City, Orleans County, Vermont, Vermont, United States

Services
- Beds: 25

History
- Founded: 1919

Links
- Website: http://www.northcountryhospital.org/
- Lists: Hospitals in Vermont

North Country Hospital is a Critical Access Hospital in Newport City, Vermont.

It was founded in 1919. It is run by a board of trustees. Claudio Fort is president and CEO. The hospital was the only one in Vermont in 2007 to achieve 100% on all Medicaid and Medicare quality measures.

== Operations ==
The hospital billed patients $141 million in 2010, and collected $76.5 million. Their operating expense was $75 million.

The chief executive officer is Tom Frank.

The hospital had 605 employees in 2011.

The hospital directly employs about 75% of its professional medical staff.

== History ==
The hospital was founded in 1919. After fundraising, construction began on Longview Street in May 1922. On July 1, 1924, the 24-bed hospital opened as Orleans County Memorial Hospital, with five full-time employees and a nursing school. It ultimately grew to 72 beds in a 26,000 square feet (2,400 m^{2}) building.

In the early 1970s, Orleans and Essex County worked to raise funds for a new hospital. It opened January 5, 1974, as North Country Hospital, on 30 acres (12 ha) on Prouty Drive. It had 80 beds, an OB/GYN department, pediatrics ward, intensive care/coronary unit, quarters for radiology, laboratory, physical therapy, a fully staffed 24-hour emergency service department, and a then-modern surgical suite. It cost $5 million, raised mostly from government funding.

Since 1974, additional facilities have included an imaging services, physical therapy, library, information systems, ambulatory surgery suites, birthing rooms, a mobile MRI site, and three new buildings for physician practices in a medical village adjacent to the hospital.

Medical practice changed over the years. There was no longer a need for a high inpatient, long-length of stay facility.

In September, 2001 the hospital broke ground for the largest building project since the hospital was built. It was completed in 2003. The 28,614 square feet (2,658.3 m^{2}) addition included a surgical suite, new emergency department with indoor ambulance bays, outpatient services, and central sterilization and distribution department.

In 2006, a dialysis center opened in the 4,000 square feet (370 m^{2}) ground floor space under the ED.

The hospital had a $55 million budget in 2007. Salaries were $24 million. Supplies cost $14 million.

=== CEOs/Hospital Administrators ===
1. Alice Grant
2. Anna Terhune
3. Tom Dowd 1971+
4. James Cassidy 1980 - 1987
5. Sid Toll 1987 - 2002
6. Karen Weller 2002 – 2008
7. Claudio Fort 2009 - 2018
8. Brian Nall 2018 - 2022
9. Tom Frank 2023+
