= Windsor Village Historic District (Windsor, Vermont) =

Historic district in Vermont, United States

- U.S. National Register of Historic Places
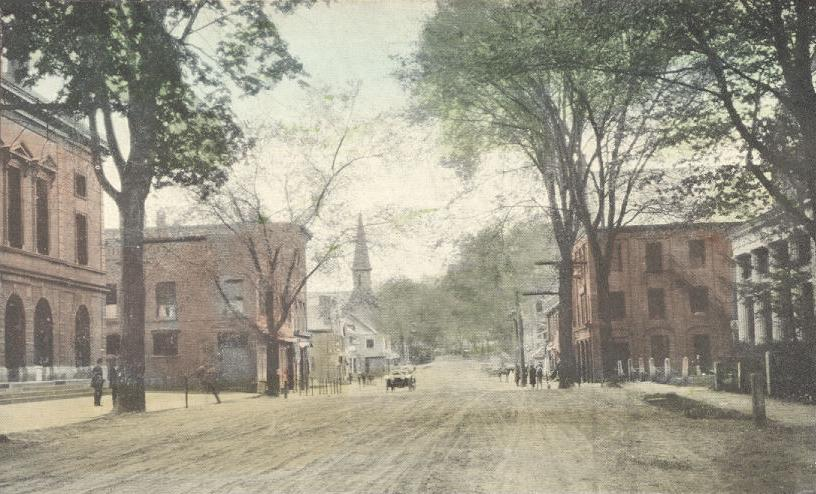
- Main Street on a 1910 postcard

- Location within Vermont Location within the United States
- Location: Center of Windsor, Vermont
- Coordinates: 43°28′50″N 72°23′13″W
- Area: 50 acres (20 ha) (original); 1.2 acres (0.49 ha) (size of 1997 increase)
- NRHP reference No.: 75000212 (original); 97000828 (increase 1); 14001036 (increase 2)

Significant dates
- Added to NRHP: April 23, 1975
- Boundary increases: July 25, 1997; December 1, 2014

The Windsor Village Historic District is a historical district in the center of Windsor, Vermont. It includes several dozen properties which were built in the 18th, the 19th, and in the beginning of the 20th centuries, built in different architectural styles. The district is listed on the National Register of Historic Places since April 23, 1975.

Originally, the district was designated along Main Street, Depot Avenue, and State Street through and including Court Square. Later, Phelps Ct. was added.

== History ==
In 1777, in the Old Constitution House, which is a part of the district, the constitution of the Vermont Republic was drafted. Initially, Windsor was a part-time capital of the Republic, and it remains the seat of Windsor County. This guaranteed an influx of population to the town. Many of newcomers were highly educated professionals. The location of Windsor on the banks of the Connecticut River provided an easy access to transportation routes, and this access was further reinforced by the construction of a railway in 1847. In the 19th century, Windsor was a prosperous industrial and administrative center. This resulted in intensive construction, with industrial-related buildings concentrated on the Main Street and Depot Avenue, including the railway station, and residential buildings located on State Street and in the northern end of Main Street. By the end of the 19th century, the major industrial enterprises in Windsor were producing water pumps, firearms, machine tools, and cotton.

== Properties ==
As of 1975, the list of properties included the properties listed below. In 1997, three properties on Phelps Court and State Street were added. It was again enlarged in 2014.

| # | Name | Image | Address | Year built | Style | Notes |
|---|---|---|---|---|---|---|
| 1 | House | | 9 Main Street | circa 1900 | Vernacular Queen Anne | |
| 2 | House | | 15 Main Street | circa 1900 | Vernacular Queen Anne | |
| 3 | Jesse Lull House | | 17 Main Street | 1806 | Federal | |
| 4 | Carlos Coolidge House | | 21 Main Street | 1806 | Federal | |
| 5 | Naham Trask House | Nahum Trask House, 25 North Main Street, Windsor, Windsor County, VT HABS VT,14-WIND,1-1 | 25 Main Street | 1796 | Federal | |
| 6 | House | | 29 Main Street | circa 1890 | Vernacular Queen Anne | |
| 7 | Samuel Patrick Jr. House | | 33 Main Street | circa 1825 | Federal | |
| 8 | Luther Mills House | | 35 Main Street | circa 1840 | Gothic revival | |
| 9 | House | | 37 Main Street | | | |
| 10 | House | | 39 Main Street | | | |
| 11 | Congregational Parsonage | | 41 Main Street | | | |
| 12 | House | | 43 Main Street | | | |
| 13 | House | | 49 Main Street | | | |
| 14 | Unitarian Church | | Main Street | 1846 | Gothic revival | |
| 15 | United States Post Office | | 57 Main Street | 1856-1859 | Italianate Revival | It is the oldest active post office building in the United States. |
| 16 | Tuxbury Block | | 61 Main Street | 1898 | High Victorian Italianate | |
| 17 | Stone Tracy Block | | 65 Main Street | 1888 | Italianate revival | |
| 18 | Amsden Block | | 23 Depot Avenue | circa 1890 | Italianate revival | |
| 19 | Central Vermont Railway Freight Station | | | circa 1850 | | |
| 20 | Central Vermont Railway Station | | Depot Avenue | circa 1905 | Vernacular Romanesque | |
| 21 | Putnam Block | | 85-89 Main Street | 1914 | | |
| 22 | Colby Block | | 105 Main Street | 1831 | Federal | |
| 23 | Sherman Block | | 107-113 Main Street | | | |
| 24 | House | | 133 Main Street | | Greek Revival | |
| 25 | Windsor Diner | | 135 Main Street | 1955 | | Moved to Windsor in 1958 |
| 26 | House | | 137 Main Street | | | |
| 27 | House | | 139 Main Street | | | |
| 28 | House | | 145 Main Street | | Vernacular Queen Anne | |
| 29 | Municipal Building (Windsor Fire Station) | | 147 Main Street | 1929 | Georgian Revival | |
| 30 | House | | 149 Main Street | 1790 | Colonial | |
| 31 | House | | 151 Main Street | | | |
| 32 | House | | 153 Main Street | | | |
| 33 | Reuben Dean House | | 161 Main Street | circa 1770 | | Rebuilt in 1899 |
| 34 | Methodist Parsonage | | 165 Main Street | | | |
| 35 | Rachel Harlow Methodist Church | | Main Street | 1895 | High Victorian Gothic | |
| 36 | Clement Pettes House | | 156 Main Street | circa 1825 | Federal | |
| 37 | Shubael Wardner House | | 150 Main Street | circa 1825 | Federal | |
| 38 | Old South Congregational Church | | 128 Main Street | 1798 | Federal | Vermont's earliest Federal church, designed by renowned architect Asher Benjamin in 1797. Reconstructed in 1844, 1879, and 1922. |
| 39 | Old Apothecary Shop (Old Bank Building) | | 108 Main Street | 1804 | | |
| 40 | Isaac Green House (Knights of Columbus) | | 106 Main Street | 1792 | | |
| 41 | Nathaniel Leonard House (Masonic Lodge) | | 104 Main Street | 1785 | Georgian | |
| 42 | Bianchi Block | | 88-94 Main Street | 1915 | | |
| 43 | Merrifield Block | | 82-86 Main Street | 1849 | | |
| 44 | Stiles-Billings Block (Rexall Drugs) | | 80 Main Street | circa 1870 | | |
| 45 | Miller-Stuart Block | | 9 State Street | circa 1830 | | |
| 46 | Old Windsor Savings Bank Block | | 15 State Street | circa 1820 | | |
| 47 | Annex to Old Windsor Savings Bank Block | | 15 State Street | circa 1870 | | |
| 48 | St. Paul's Episcopal Church | | 27 State Street | 1820-1822 | Classical style | An early work by the Boston architect, Alexander Parris. The building survives essentially unaltered and is in good condition. |
| 49 | Episcopal Parsonage | | 37 State Street | | | |
| 50 | House | | 39 State Street | | | |
| 51 | Windsor Library | | 43 State Street | Georgian Revival | circa 1905 | |
| 52 | Rufus Emerson-Gilbert Davis House (Davis Home) | | 45 State Street | Federal | 1831 | |
| 53 | House | | 46 Court Square | Federal | circa 1800 | |
| 54 | Johonnot House | | 44 Court Square | Federal | circa 1830 | |
| 55 | House | | 40 Court Square | | | |
| 56 | McIndoe House | | 5 Court Street | Gothic Revival | 1840 | |
| 57 | House | | 10 Court Street | Vernacular Queen Anne | circa 1890 | |
| 58 | House | | 8 Court Street | Gothic Revival | circa 1860 | |
| 59 | House | | 6 Court Street | Greek Revival | circa 1840 | |
| 60 | Windsor Town Hall (American Legion Hall) | | Court Street | Romanesque | 1888 | |
| 61 | Old Windsor County Courthouse (Carleton Hall) | | 24 State Street | | 1786 | Moved to the current location in 1888 |
| 62 | Commercial Block | | 16 State Street | | | |
| 63 | Commercial Block | | 12 State Street | | | |
| 64 | Commercial Block | | 10 State Street | | | |
| 65 | Tontine Block (Windsor News Co.) | | 70 Main Street | | circa 1825 | |
| 66 | J. J. Newberry Co. | | 64-68 Main Street | | 1929 | |
| 67 | Pettes-Journal Block (Vermont National Bank) | | 60 Main Street | Federal | 1824 | |
| 68 | Old Namco (National Acme Machine Company) Armory | | Main Street | | circa 1910 | |
| 69 | Windsor House | | 54 Main Street | Greek Revival | 1836 | A separate NRHP listing |
| 70 | Thomas Emerson-Edwin Stoughton House (Old Windsor Hospital) | | 48 Main Street | Federal | 1836 | Served as Windsor's hospital from 1933 until the opening of the Mt. Ascutney Hospital and Health Center in 1972. |
| 71 | Baptist Church | | Main Street | Pseudo Gothic Revival | 1943 | |
| 72 | Abner Forbes House | | 38 Main Street | Federal | 1796 | |
| 73 | Zebina Curtis-William Maxwell Evarts House | | 34 Main Street | Georgian | 1796 | |
| 74 | John Skinner House | | 26 Main Street | Federal | circa 1820 | |
| 75 | Joseph Hatch (Edminster) House | | 24 Main Street | Federal | circa 1825 | |
| 76 | Simeon Ide House | | 20 Main Street | Federal | circa 1825 | |
| 77 | Susan Bishop House | | 18 Main Street | Greek Revival | | |
| 78 | Old Constitution House | | Main Street | | circa 1776 | A separate NRHP listing |
