= Marshall H. Twitchell =

American politician

Marshall Harvey Twitchell
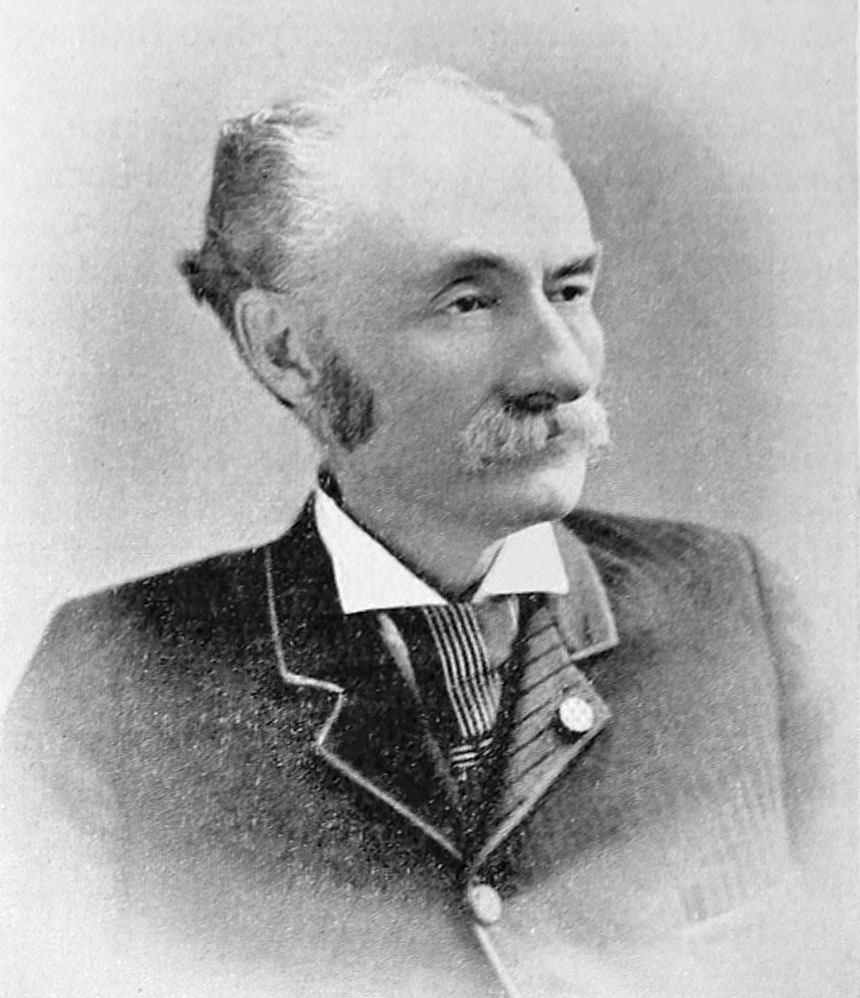
- From 1894's Men of Vermont Illustrated

United States Consul to Kingston, Ontario, Canada
- In office 1878–1905
- Preceded by: James M. True
- Succeeded by: Howard D. Van Sant

Member of the Louisiana State Senate from Bienville, Red River and De Soto Parishes
- In office 1870–1877
- Preceded by: John R. Williams
- Succeeded by: James W. Sandiford

Personal details
- Born: February 29, 1840 Townshend, Vermont, USA
- Died: August 21, 1905 (aged 65) Kingston, Ontario, Canada
- Resting place: Oakwood Cemetery, Townshend, Vermont
- Party: Republican
- Spouse(s): Adele Coleman Twitchell (m. 1866-1873, her death); Henrietta Day Twitchell (m. 1876-1902, her death)
- Children: 3
- Occupation: Government official

Military service
- Allegiance: United States of America: Union
- Branch/service: United States Army: Union Army
- Years of service: 1861-1866
- Rank: Captain
- Unit: 4th Vermont Infantry; 109th Colored Infantry; Freedmen's Bureau
- Commands: Company H, 109th Colored Infantry
- Battles/wars: American Civil War: Siege of Yorktown; Battle of Savage's Station; Seven Days Battles; Battle of the Wilderness; Siege of Petersburg; Battle of Appomattox Court House

Marshall Harvey Twitchell (February 29, 1840 – August 21, 1905) was a teacher, officer in the Union Army, and businessman. Originally from Vermont, he became a prominent political figure in Louisiana's post-war Reconstruction, including two terms as a Republican member of the Louisiana State Senate. He was seriously wounded during the Civil War and was shot multiple times in an assassination attempt by white supremacists after the war. He returned north, served as a diplomat in Canada, and wrote a memoir.

A native of Townsend, Vermont, Twitchell taught school before joining the Union Army for the American Civil War. After service with the 4th Vermont Infantry, he joined 109th Colored Infantry and commanded a company as a captain. His command was part of the column that broke the Confederate lines at Petersburg, Virginia, and he was present at Appomattox for Lee's surrender.

After service in Louisiana with the Freedmen's Bureau, Twitchell became active in Louisiana's post-war Reconstruction. He became a plantation owner and expanded his holdings to include stores, mills, hotels, and newspapers. He was elected to the state senate in 1869, where he played a key role in creating Red River Parish, over which he exercised political control because of his alliance with African American voters, who voted for anti-slavery Republicans over pro-Confederate Democrats.

In 1876, an assassin armed with a rifle attempted to murder Twitchell as he traveled by boat to Coushatta, the Red River Parish seat. Twitchell was hit multiple times, and survived by pretending to be dead. Both his arms had to be amputated, and Twitchell wore artificial arms and hands for the rest of his life. The assassin targeted Twitchell as the result of efforts by Redeemer Democrats to end Louisiana's Reconstruction and prevent black voters from participating in the political process; Twitchell's death would have given Democrats control of the state senate. They already held the state's House of Representatives and governorship, so controlling the senate would have ended Republican political leadership of the state. After recovering from his wounds, Twitchell left Louisiana, which was taken over by Democrats. In 1878, he was appointed U.S. Consul in Kingston, Ontario, Canada, where he served until his death. Twitchell died in Kingston on August 21, 1905, and was buried at Oakwood Cemetery in Townshend.

== Early years ==
Twitchell was born in Townshend, Vermont, on February 29, 1840, a son of Harvey Daniel Twitchell (died 1864) and the former Elizabeth Scott (died 1899). He was raised in Townsend and Montgomery, as well as Bedford, Quebec, and educated in the local schools and at Townshend's Leland Seminary. Twitchell taught school during the winters and worked on a farm and attended school during the remainder of the year. He graduated from Leland in 1860, and was the valedictorian of his class. He studied law briefly with Townshend attorney John Roberts before deciding to join the Union Army.

== Military service ==
In 1861, at the outbreak of the American Civil War, Twitchell enlisted in Company I, 4th Vermont Infantry. After the regiment arrived in Washington, D.C., it performed guard duty and completed training in preparation for combat. Twitchell was assigned as company clerk and promoted to corporal, sergeant, and first sergeant. He took part in the Siege of Yorktown in 1862, and was wounded three times at the Battle of Lee's Mill, but none seriously. He took part in additional fighting with the 4th Vermont, including the Battle of Savage's Station and the Seven Days Battles.

In the winter of 1863, Twitchell received his commission as a first lieutenant in Company H, 109th Colored Infantry. He commanded his company as a captain and was at the Battle of the Wilderness in 1864. Left for dead as the result of a bullet which entered the corner of his left eye and emerged from behind his left ear, Twitchell surprised members of his unit when he got to his feet and began walking towards a hospital, after which an ambulance picked him up and transported him the rest of the way. Twitchell recovered, but was left with a scar that made him easily identifiable during his years in Louisiana, when he was targeted by multiple assassination attempts.

In 1865, he was part of the column which broke through the Confederate defenses during the Siege of Petersburg and surrounded the remnants of the Army of Northern Virginia. He also took part in the Battle of Appomattox Court House, and was present at Lee's surrender to General Ulysses S. Grant. In May 1865, Twitchell was among several officers of the United States Colored Troops who were recommended for brevet promotions to recognize their valor and distinguished service. He was nominated for advancement to brevet major, but the United States Senate did not act on the recommendation, so it was never confirmed.

== Post-Civil War ==
In the fall of 1865, Twitchell was named provost marshal and agent of the Freedmen's Bureau, a Reconstruction agency aimed at assisting the freedmen in the transition from slavery to freedom. Twitchell's initial headquarters were in Sparta, Bienville Parish, Louisiana.

In 1866, Twitchell purchased a cotton plantation on Lake Bistineau at the junction of Bienville, Bossier, and Webster parishes. Twitchell married a Louisiana woman who refused to consider moving to Vermont, so he brought several of his northern relatives to Louisiana. In 1869, his father-in-law transferred to Twitchell the management of two plantations, which he operated successfully. In 1869, Twitchell purchased "Starlight", a plantation on the Red River. He helped found the town of Coushatta, and steadily added to his properties, including ownership of two stores, two mills, a hotel, and a newspaper.

== Louisiana politician ==
When Louisiana's Reconstruction government began the work necessary to be readmitted to the Union, Twitchell was elected as a delegate to the state's 1868 constitutional convention. In 1869, he was elected to the first of two four-year terms in the state senate, having won critical African American support because of his championing of their causes and the individual friendships he had established with many freedmen in his district.

He was the principal force behind the creation of Red River Parish and the establishment of Coushatta as the parish seat. When the parish police jury was elected in 1871, Twitchell was chosen as its president, making him the head of the parish government and the parish school superintendent. He appointed relatives and political supporters to key positions and was influential in improving the education of his black supporters by organizing segregated public schools in Bienville, Red River, and De Soto parishes. Among the tactics Twitchell used to protect the schools for black residents was threatening to withhold signatures on the warrants authorizing pay for teachers at all the parish schools.

Twitchell's life was constantly in danger, and he was targeted several times by assassins. In 1874, Twitchell's only brother, Homer and two brothers-in-law, Clark Holland and Monroe Willis, were murdered in the Coushatta massacre. The massacre was an attempt by Democrats in Red River Parish to seize control of the local government by killing or disenfranchising Republicans, including the parish's African-American residents. Twitchell obtained federal authority to investigate, which led to the arrest of several prominent individuals, exacerbating tension between Twitchell and the pro-Confederate Democrats who were attempting to reclaim political power in Louisiana.

=== Assassination attempt ===
On May 2, 1876, an assassin armed with a rifle attempted to kill Twitchell while he was traveling by boat to Coushatta, the Red River Parish seat. He was wounded six times, which required the amputation of both arms above the elbow. His brother-in-law, George A. King, was killed in the attack. Twitchell would also have been killed, but when he pretended to be dead, the shooter stopped firing.

Had the shooter succeeded, the partisan balance in the State Senate would have placed Redeemer Democrats in the majority. A Democratic senate would have ended Republican control of Louisiana by recognizing a Democratic Louisiana House of Representatives and governor, and electing a Democratic U.S. senator.

Twitchell's property was abandoned or seized in court proceedings in the years after the attempted assassination. His neighbors had reportedly been jealous of his political and economic success during the downturn caused by the Panic of 1873 and were not upset to see him ruined. Two of his sisters died in Louisiana, with stress and heartbreak from the deaths of their relatives a contributing factor.

== Later years ==
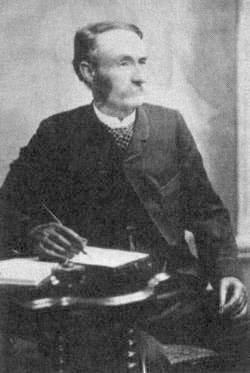
Twitchell wears artificial arms while posing during his service as U.S. Consul in Kingston, Ontario

The surviving Twitchell family members stayed for a time in Indianapolis, Indiana, where Twitchell's surviving sister Helen T. Willis succumbed to illness and died. Twitchell and his mother returned to Vermont, the only survivors of the nine Twitchells who had moved to Louisiana.

In April 1878, U.S. President Rutherford B. Hayes appointed Twitchell U.S. consul at Kingston in Ontario, Canada, a position that he held for the remainder of his life. He was retained through successive presidential administrations because the government of Canada requested that he be kept on, and at the time of his death he was the oldest U.S. consul on duty. In 1882, he declined President Chester A. Arthur's offer of appointment as Minister to Portugal, preferring the routine of his life in Kingston to ambassadorial rank. When it appeared in 1885 that the administration of President Grover Cleveland, a Democrat, would have Twitchell replaced by Twitchell's vice consul (also a Democrat), the vice consul wrote to U.S. Secretary of State Thomas F. Bayard to say he preferred that Twitchell retain the post. During the Spanish–American War, Twitchell was credited with intercepting three Spanish spies who attempted to enter the United States for the purpose of joining the U.S. Army as part of their clandestine mission, for which he was commended by the U.S. government.

Twitchell was a member of the Military Order of the Loyal Legion of the United States, Grand Army of the Republic, Reunion Society of Vermont Officers, and Masons. He made frequent public and speech making appearances at events in Kingston including parades, in which he sometimes appeared in a Union Army captain's uniform.

== Death and burial ==
On August 18, 1905, Twitchell was paralyzed by a stroke at his home in Kingston. He remained bedridden and did not regain consciousness, and died on August 21, 1905. Twitchell received a private funeral attended by family and friends in Kingston, followed by a public service with Masonic honors. After his remains were transported to Vermont, he received a funeral with Masonic honors at Townshend's Congregational church. He was interred at Oakwood Cemetery in Townshend, Vermont.

== Family ==
In 1866, Twitchell married Adele Coleman (1846-1874), daughter of a Louisiana plantation owner. They were the parents of two sons, Marshall Coleman Twitchell (1871–1949), and Daniel, who died as an infant a few weeks after his mother. Adele Twitchell died of tuberculosis in 1874.

In 1876, Twitchell married a childhood sweetheart, the former Henrietta Cushman Day (1843-1902) of Hampden, Massachusetts. They were the parents of a son, Emmus George Twitchell (1880-1961). Henrietta Twitchell died in Kingston and was buried at Oakwood Cemetery.

== Sources ==
=== Books ===
- Tunnell, Ted (2001). Edge of the Sword: The Ordeal of Carpetbagger Marshall H. Twitchell in the Civil War and Reconstruction. Baton Rouge, LA: Louisiana State University Press. ISBN 978-0-8071-3023-0 – via Google Books.
- Tunnell, Ted (1984). Crucible of Reconstruction: War, Radicalism, and Race in Louisiana, 1862--1877. Baton Rouge, LA: Louisiana State University Press. p. 165. ISBN 978-0-8071-1803-0 – via Google Books.
- Zuczek, Richard, ed. (2016). Reconstruction: A Historical Encyclopedia of the American Mosaic. Santa Barbara, CA: ABC-CLIO. pp. 352–353. ISBN 978-1-61069-917-4 – via Google Books.
- Ullery, Jacob G. (1894). Men of Vermont Illustrated. Brattleboro, VT: Transcript Publishing Company. pp. 160–161 – via Internet Archive.
- United States Department of War (1894). The War of the Rebellion: A Compilation of the Official Records of the Union and Confederate Armies. Washington, DC: US Government Printing Office. p. 1230 – via Google Books.
- Zeller, Paul G. (2018). The Vermont Brigade in the Seven Days: The Battles and Their Personal Aftermath. Jefferson, NC: McFarland & Company. p. 71. ISBN 978-1-4766-7661-6 – via Google Books.

=== Newspapers ===
- "Order Forty: A Ghastly Illustration of Precisely What it Actually Signified in Louisiana". Chicago Inter Ocean. Chicago, IL. October 9, 1880. p. 9 – via Newspapers.com.
- "Death of Col. M. H. Twitchell". St. Albans Messenger. St. Albans, VT. August 21, 1905. p. 1 – via Newspapers.com.
- "Death Notice, Colonel M. H. Twitchell". Montreal Gazette. Montreal, Quebec, Canada. August 22, 1905. p. 4 – via Newspapers.com.
- "The Late Col. Twitchell". Burlington Free Press. Burlington, VT. August 24, 1905. p. 5 – via Newspapers.com.
- "Funeral Services for the Late M. C. Twitchell Yesterday (sic)". Brattleboro Reformer. Brattleboro, VT. August 25, 1905. p. 5 – via Newspapers.com.
- Schoettler, Carl (December 5, 1990). "Carpetbagger suffered violence of the war and aftermath". The Baltimore Sun. Baltimore, MD.

=== Internet ===
- Rice, Helena G. (October 1, 2012). "Biographical Note, Marshall Harvey Twitchell" (PDF). Marshall Harvey Twitchell Collection. Barre, VT: Vermont Historical Society.
- "Parish History: Red River Parish". Red River Parish, Louisiana Genealogy and History. Genealogy Trails History Group. March 1, 2006.

=== Magazines ===
- Rodrigue, John C. (Winter 2001). "Book Review: Edge of the Sword". Georgia Historical Quarterly. Atlanta, GA: Georgia Historical Society. pp. 651–653. JSTOR 40584492.
