= St. Albans (city), Vermont =

City in Vermont, United States

Saint Albans, Vermont
- City
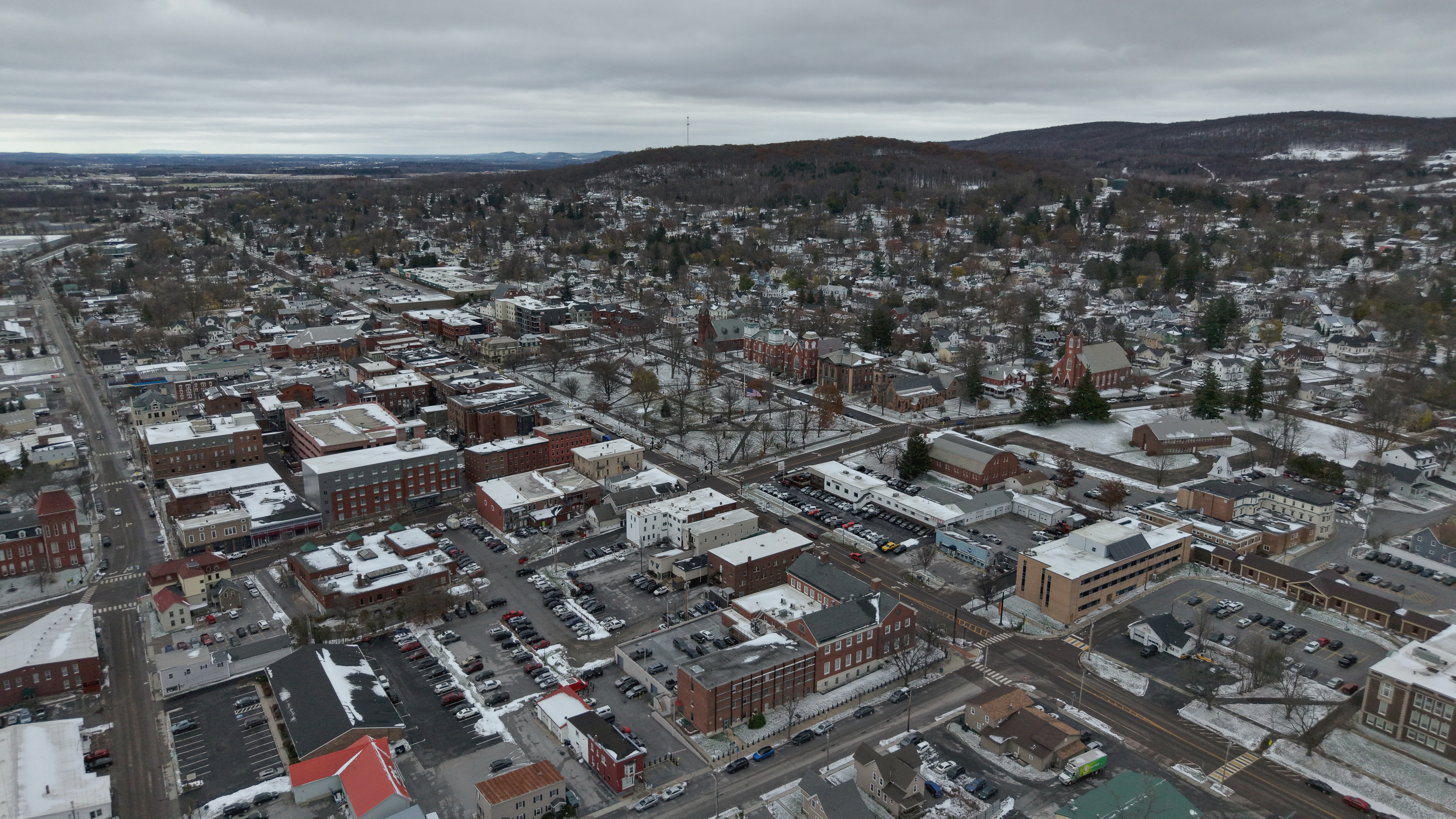
- Saint Albans, VT, from the southwest

- Logo
- Nickname: Railroad City of Vermont
- Location in Franklin County and the state of Vermont
- Coordinates: 44°48′43″N 73°05′06″W
- Country: United States
- State: Vermont
- County: Franklin
- Settled: 1783
- Organized (town): 1785
- Chartered (city): 1896

Area
  - Total: 2.03 sq mi (5.25 km^{2})
  - Land: 2.03 sq mi (5.25 km^{2})
  - Water: 0 sq mi (0.00 km^{2})
- Elevation: 394 ft (120 m)

Population (2020)
  - Total: 6,877
  - Density: 3,393/sq mi (1,309.9/km^{2})
- Time zone: UTC−5 (EST)
  - Summer (DST): UTC−4 (EDT)
- ZIP code: 05478
- Area code: 802
- FIPS code: 50-61675
- GNIS feature ID: 1462196
- Website: www.stalbansvt.com

St. Albans or Saint Albans is the only city in and the shire town of Franklin County, Vermont, United States. At the 2020 census, the city population was 6,877. St. Albans City is completely surrounded by Saint Albans Town, which is a separate municipality. The city is in Northwestern Vermont, approximately 15 miles south of the Canadian border and 30 miles north of Burlington. The city is known as the "Railroad City of Vermont" and hosts the annual Vermont Maple Festival.

== History ==
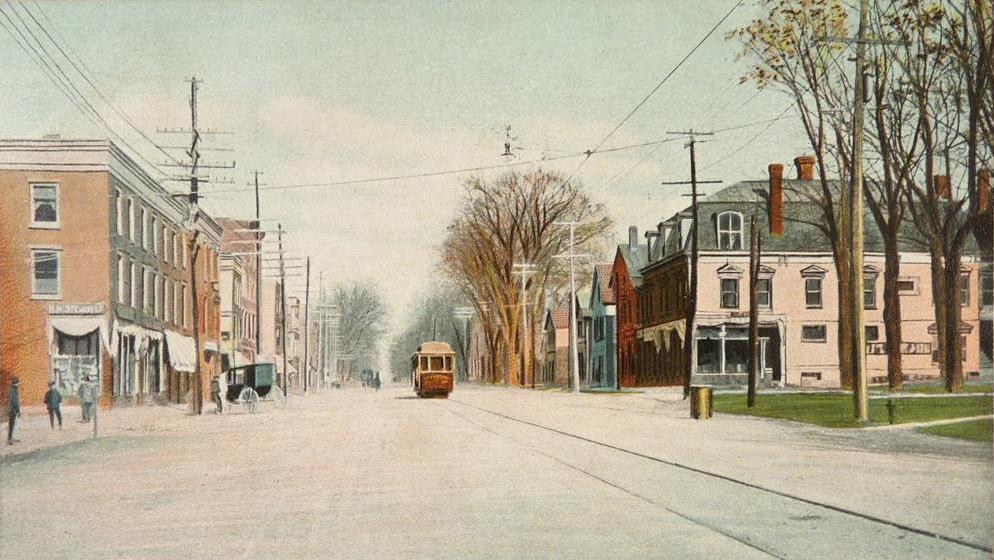
Main Street in 1909

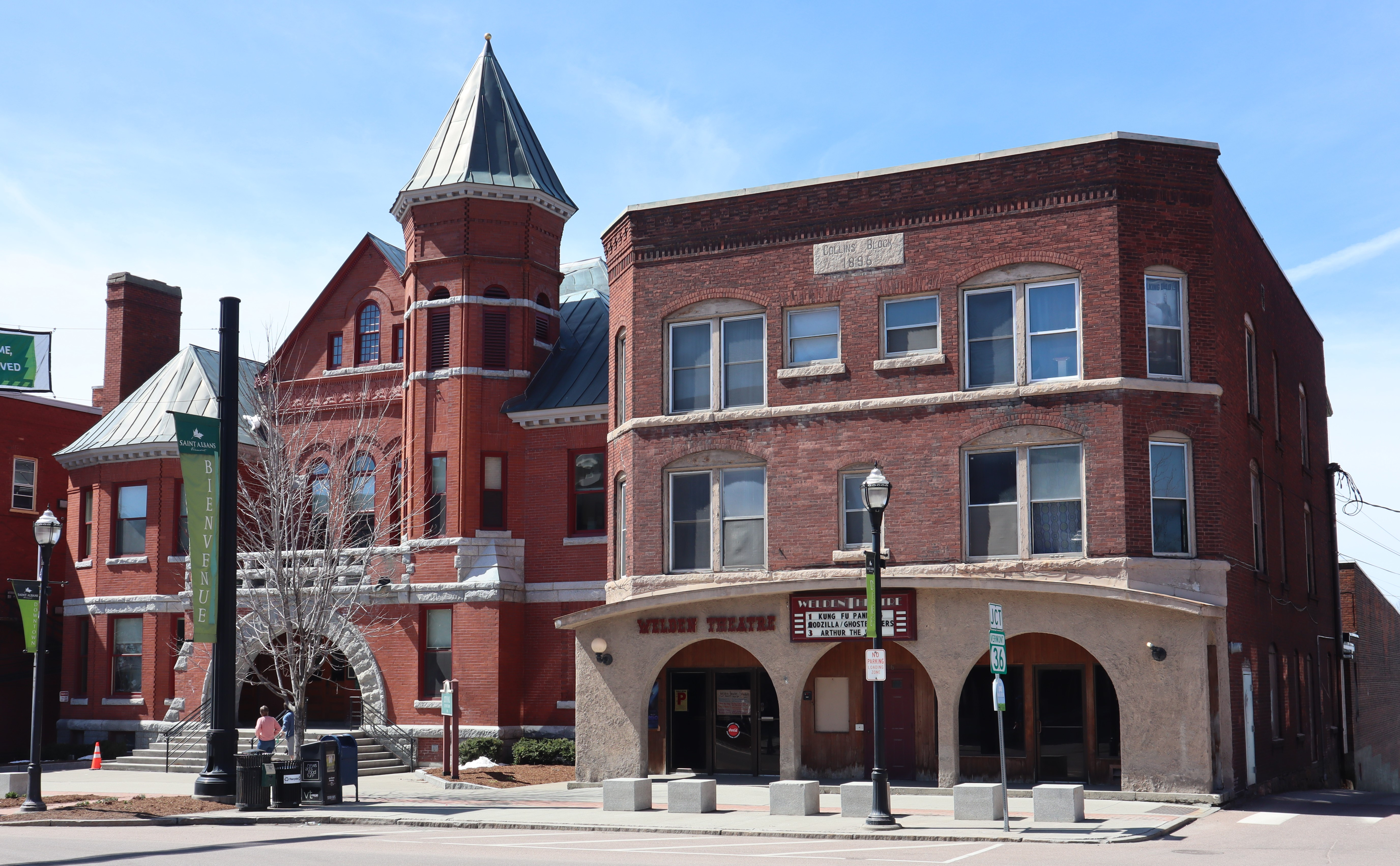
St. Albans City Hall and Welden Theatre on Main Street

One of the New Hampshire grants, St. Albans was chartered by Colonial Governor Benning Wentworth on August 17, 1763, to Stephen Pomeroy and 63 others. Named after St Albans, Hertfordshire, England, it was first settled during the Revolution by Jesse Welden. The war delayed further settlement until 1785, when other pioneers began to arrive from lower New England.

Farmers found the rich, dark loam suitable for cultivation, as well as for the raising of cattle, horses and sheep. Butter and cheese were produced in great quantities. St. Albans also became known as " The Rail City," home to a major depot, operations center and repair shop of the Vermont and Canada Railroad. When the village was incorporated in 1859, it had an iron foundry, a manufacturer of freight cars, and a large number of mechanic shops.

The northernmost engagement of the Civil War, known as the St. Albans Raid, occurred here on October 19, 1864.

In 1869 the Congrégation de Notre Dame, founded in Montreal, Quebec, in the 17th century, established Villa Barlow Convent and St. Mary High School in St. Albans.

In 1902, the City of St. Albans was incorporated, comprising two square miles (518 hectares) within the town of St. Albans. Today it is a tourist destination noted for its Victorian and Craftsman style architecture. Much of this was built during the railroad era, when more than 200 trains passed through daily.

St. Albans is a research focus for genealogists, as European immigrants heading for the United States would sometimes land in Canada at Halifax, Nova Scotia or Montreal, Quebec, then take a train through the border crossing to this city. Some persons traveled to other parts of Vermont, New York or points west. The National Archives (NARA) lists for St. Albans cover the period 1895–1954.

== Culture ==
In late April St. Albans hosts the annual Vermont Maple Festival. The festival includes various food-related contests, as well as the Sap Run, a footrace from Swanton, 8.2 mi (13.2 km) to the north. It was home to the Vermont Voltage, a semi-professional men's soccer team, which folded in 2014.

== Geography ==
According to the United States Census Bureau, the city has a total area of 2.0 square miles (5.3 km^{2}), all land. The city is surrounded by the town of St. Albans, with its lush farmland across gently rolling hills. The city is drained by Stevens Brook.

St. Albans is crossed by Interstate 89, U.S. Route 7, as well as Vermont Route 36, 38, 104 and 105. It is about 15 miles (24 km) from Vermont's border with Quebec.

=== Climate ===
St Albans has a warm-summer humid continental climate (Köppen Dfb), bordering on a hot-summer humid continental climate (Köppen Dfa).

Climate data for St Albans Radio, 1991–2020 normals, 1929-2020 extremes: 380ft (116m)
Month	Jan	Feb	Mar	Apr	May	Jun	Jul	Aug	Sep	Oct	Nov	Dec	Year
Record high °F (°C)	64 (18)	63 (17)	80 (27)	88 (31)	92 (33)	96 (36)	98 (37)	99 (37)	95 (35)	86 (30)	74 (23)	66 (19)	99 (37)
Mean maximum °F (°C)	49.8 (9.9)	49.6 (9.8)	58.2 (14.6)	75.5 (24.2)	83.5 (28.6)	89.5 (31.9)	88.7 (31.5)	88.5 (31.4)	83.1 (28.4)	72.4 (22.4)	65.0 (18.3)	52.8 (11.6)	89.7 (32.1)
Mean daily maximum °F (°C)	25.1 (−3.8)	28.5 (−1.9)	36.8 (2.7)	52.0 (11.1)	65.7 (18.7)	74.4 (23.6)	79.4 (26.3)	77.2 (25.1)	69.4 (20.8)	56.1 (13.4)	44.0 (6.7)	32.3 (0.2)	53.4 (11.9)
Daily mean °F (°C)	16.7 (−8.5)	19.4 (−7.0)	28.4 (−2.0)	42.7 (5.9)	56.0 (13.3)	65.1 (18.4)	70.1 (21.2)	68.0 (20.0)	60.2 (15.7)	47.9 (8.8)	36.8 (2.7)	25.0 (−3.9)	44.7 (7.1)
Mean daily minimum °F (°C)	8.2 (−13.2)	10.4 (−12.0)	20.0 (−6.7)	33.4 (0.8)	46.2 (7.9)	55.8 (13.2)	60.9 (16.1)	58.9 (14.9)	51.0 (10.6)	39.7 (4.3)	29.5 (−1.4)	17.8 (−7.9)	36.0 (2.2)
Mean minimum °F (°C)	−13.3 (−25.2)	−8.4 (−22.4)	−1.0 (−18.3)	22.4 (−5.3)	32.4 (0.2)	43.6 (6.4)	50.3 (10.2)	46.0 (7.8)	34.6 (1.4)	24.9 (−3.9)	14.2 (−9.9)	−4.5 (−20.3)	−15.1 (−26.2)
Record low °F (°C)	−32 (−36)	−30 (−34)	−19 (−28)	6 (−14)	25 (−4)	31 (−1)	38 (3)	36 (2)	14 (−10)	15 (−9)	−6 (−21)	−36 (−38)	−36 (−38)
Average precipitation inches (mm)	2.12 (54)	1.85 (47)	2.63 (67)	3.23 (82)	3.24 (82)	4.11 (104)	4.10 (104)	3.74 (95)	3.93 (100)	3.86 (98)	2.86 (73)	2.62 (67)	38.29 (973)
Average snowfall inches (cm)	16.90 (42.9)	18.30 (46.5)	16.20 (41.1)	6.20 (15.7)	0.10 (0.25)	0.00 (0.00)	0.00 (0.00)	0.00 (0.00)	0.00 (0.00)	1.20 (3.0)	5.00 (12.7)	16.00 (40.6)	79.9 (202.75)
Source 1: NOAA
Source 2: XMACIS (temp records & monthly max/mins)

== Demographics ==
Historical population
Census	Pop.	Note	%±
1900	6,239		—
1910	6,381		2.3%
1920	7,588		18.9%
1930	8,020		5.7%
1940	8,037		0.2%
1950	8,552		6.4%
1960	8,806		3.0%
1970	8,082		−8.2%
1980	7,308		−9.6%
1990	7,339		0.4%
2000	7,650		4.2%
2010	6,918		−9.6%
2020	6,877		−0.6%
U.S. Decennial Census

At the 2020 census, the racial makeup was 91.1% White, 1.2% Black, 1.3% Native American, 0.0% Asian and 1.9% Latino of any race.

At the 2010 census, there were 6,918 people. In the 2000 census there were 7,650 people, 3,235 households and 1,937 families residing in the city. The population density was 3,768.2 per square mile (1,455.0/km^{2}). There were 3,376 housing units at an average density of 1,662.9 per square mile (642.1/km^{2}). The racial makeup of the city was 95.87% White, 0.39% Black or African American, 1.20% Native American, 0.35% Asian, 0.03% Pacific Islander, 0.45% from other races, and 1.70% from two or more races. 0.90% of the population were Hispanic or Latino of any race.

There were 3,235 households, of which 31.6% had children under the age of 18 living with them, 43.6% were married couples living together, 12.1% had a female householder with no husband present, and 40.1% were non-families. 31.4% of all households were made up of individuals, and 12.6% had someone living alone who was 65 years of age or older. The average household size was 2.35 and the average family size was 2.97.

Age distribution was 25.6% under the age of 18, 8.3% from 18 to 24, 31.8% from 25 to 44, 20.3% from 45 to 64, and 14.0% who were 65 years of age or older. The median age was 35 years. For every 100 females, there were 91.6 males. For every 100 females age 18 and over, there were 86.2 males.

== Government ==
St. Albans is governed via a mayor, a city manager and city council. The city council consists of six members, each elected from an individual ward. The mayor is elected by citywide vote.

== Economy ==
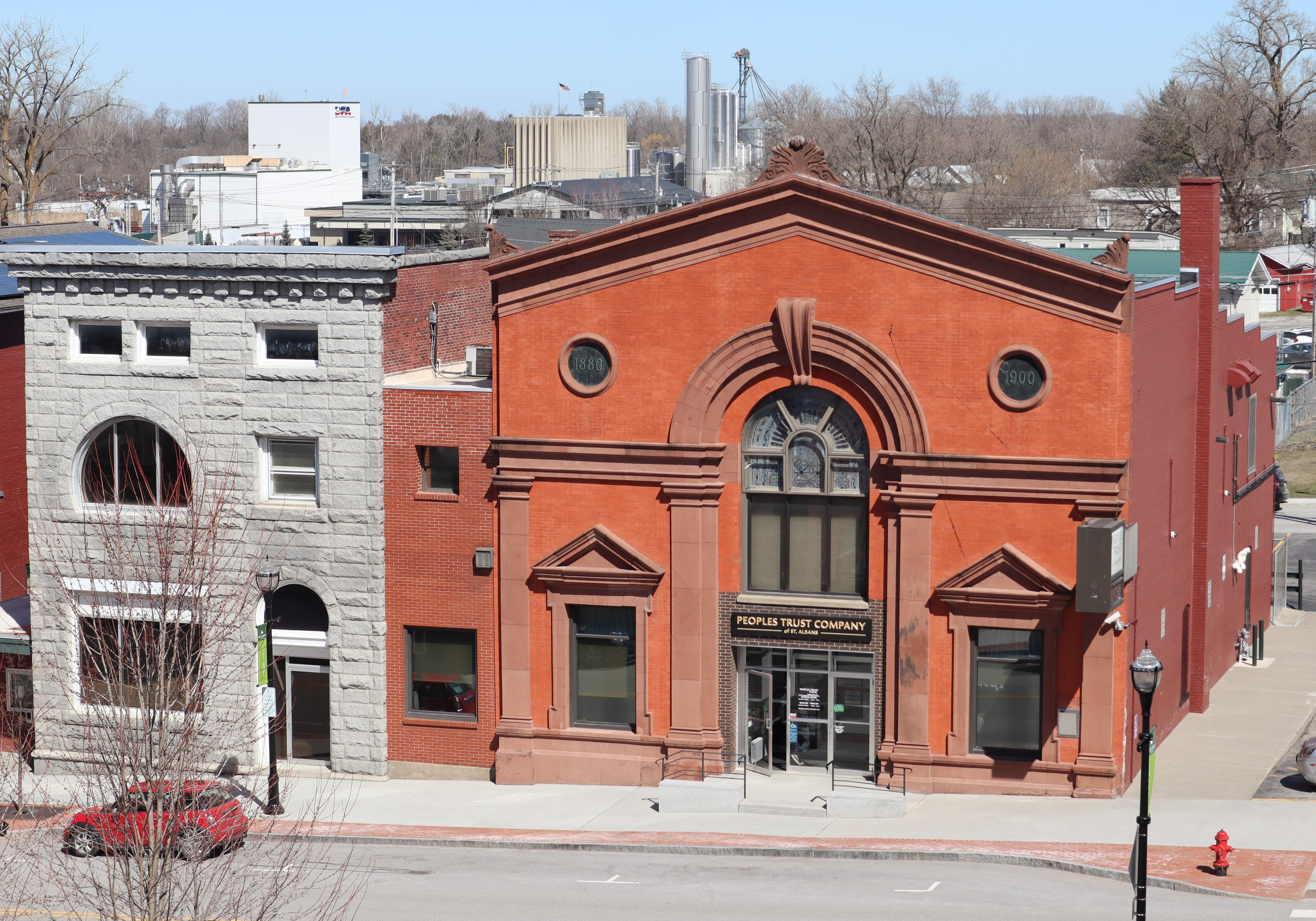
Peoples Trust Company in 2024

=== Personal income ===
In the 2010 census, the median household income was $37,221, and the median family income was $44,286. Males had a median income of $31,340 versus $23,262 for females. The city's per capita income was $17,853. About 8.5% of families and 9.6% of the population were below the poverty line, including 9.2% of those under age 18 and 11.9% of those age 65 or over.

=== Industry ===
The town's comprehensive annual financial report for the fiscal year that ended June 30, 2020, lists the principal employers in the town as U.S. Department of Homeland Security's U.S. Citizenship and Immigration Services (USCIS) (650 employees), Northwestern Medical Center (612 employees), Maple Run Unified School District (608 employees), Mylan Technologies Inc. (425 employees), Dairy Farmers of America (95 employees), Sticks & Stuff (92 employees), the City of St. Albans (91 employees), A.N. Deringer, Inc. (80 employees), Peoples Trust Company (47 employees), and SB Collins (40 employees).

The USCIS has a service center in St. Albans; the majority of the 1,100 USCIS employees in Vermont are based in St. Albans, and the federal agency is the city's largest employer. The Dairy Farmers of America, a major dairy cooperative, has a manufacturing plant in St. Albans that produces cream, condensed skim milk, and milk powder. The chocolate and cocoa supplier Barry Callebaut has a facility in the city.

== Infrastructure ==
=== Health care ===
The Northwestern Medical Center is a hospital serving the city and the Franklin County area.

=== Buses ===
Greyhound Lines stops four times daily (twice in each direction) on its Montreal to Boston route. The Saint Albans stop is on Main Street, next to Taylor Park.

=== Railways ===
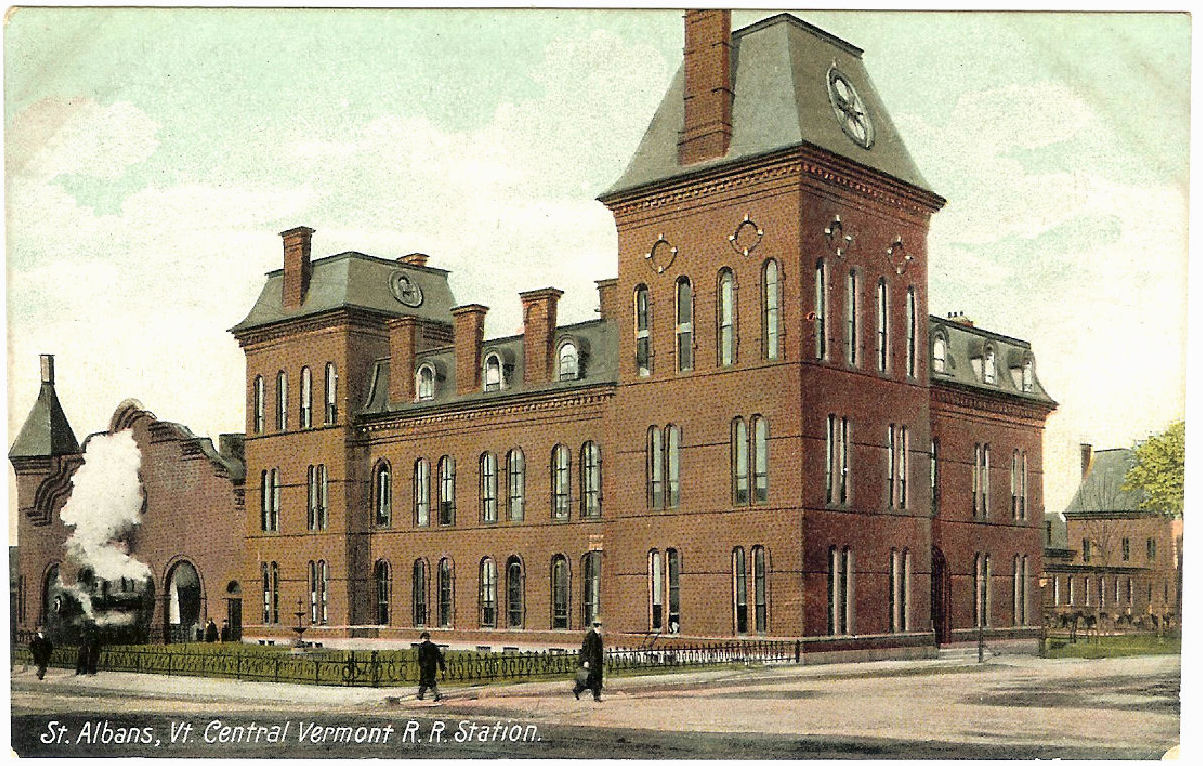
Central Vermont Railroad Station

Saint Albans is the northern terminus of the Vermonter, a coach/business class train operated by Amtrak, the national passenger rail system. The train operates daily between Saint Albans and Washington, D.C.

The train formerly continued from Saint Albans to Montreal and was named the Montrealer, but that connection was discontinued in 1995.

== Education ==
It is in the Maple Run Unified School District.

St. Albans is home to St. Albans City School, an elementary school for students in kindergarten through eighth grade, and Bellows Free Academy, St. Albans, a public high school serving students from many towns in the southern half of Franklin Country.

== See also ==
- Champ (legend)
- St. Albans station (Vermont)
- St. Albans raid
- Vermont Voltage (USL soccer team)
