= Townshend, Vermont =

- Town
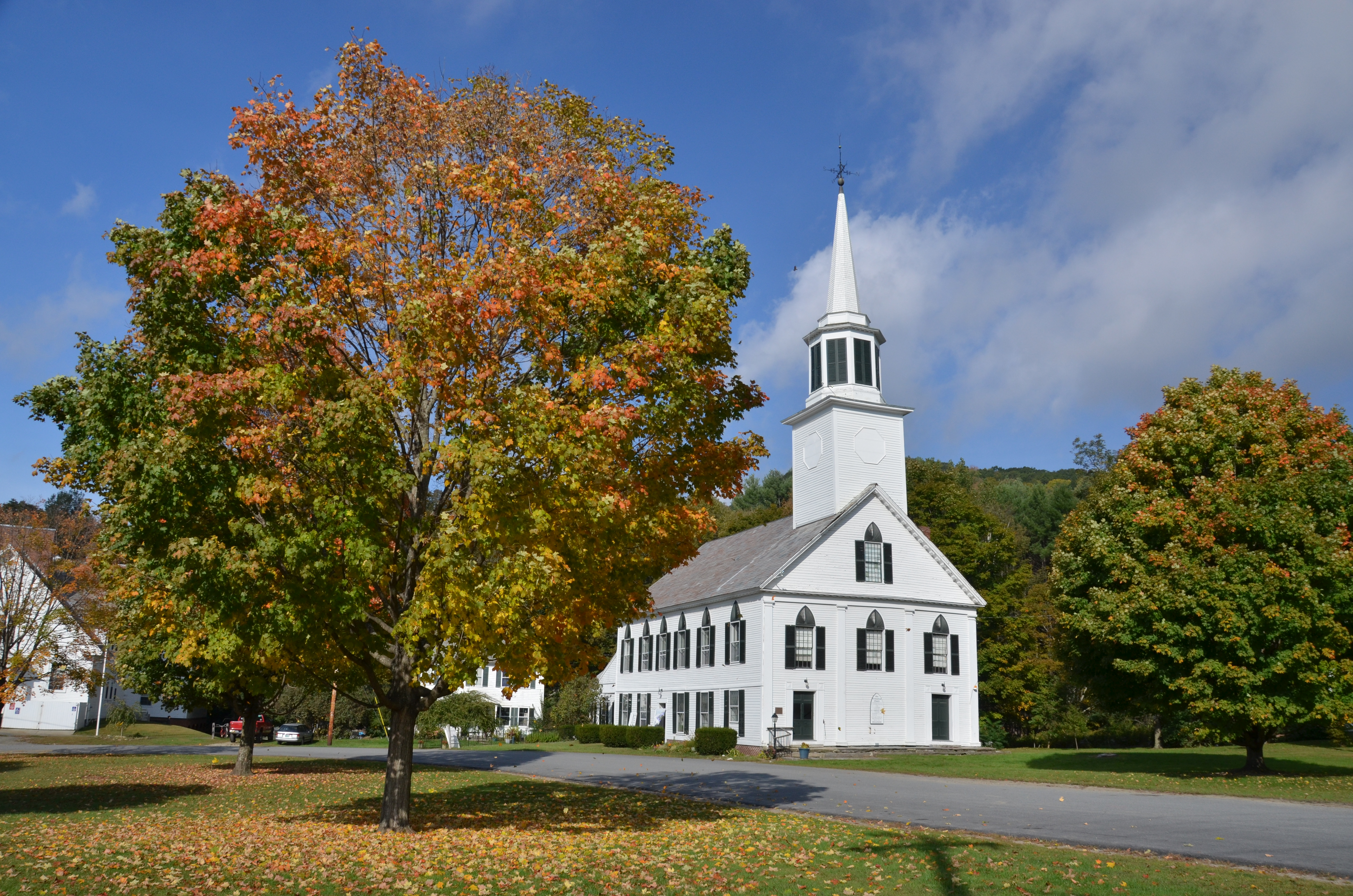
- First Congregational Church and Meetinghouse

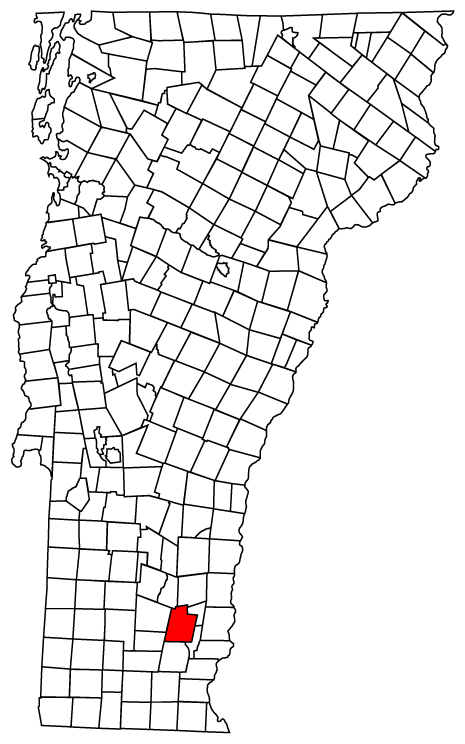
- Townshend, Vermont
- Coordinates: 43°05′25″N 72°39′40″W
- Country: United States
- State: Vermont
- County: Windham
- Communities: Townshend; Harmonyville; Simpsonville; West Townshend

Area
  - Total: 42.8 sq mi (110.8 km^{2})
  - Land: 42.7 sq mi (110.6 km^{2})
  - Water: 0.077 sq mi (0.2 km^{2})
- Elevation: 1,109 ft (338 m)

Population (2020)
  - Total: 1,291
  - Density: 28/sq mi (10.7/km^{2})
- Time zone: UTC-5 (Eastern (EST))
  - Summer (DST): UTC-4 (EDT)
- ZIP Codes: 05353 (Townshend); 05359 (West Townshend)
- Area code: 802
- FIPS code: 50-73300
- GNIS feature ID: 1462229

Townshend is a town in Windham County, Vermont, United States. The town was named for the Townshend family, powerful figures in British politics. The population was 1,291 at the 2020 census.

== History ==
The land grant for Townshend was chartered by New Hampshire Governor Benning Wentworth, on June 20, 1753. The town was named after Charles Townshend, the Secretary of War under King George III. Between 1755 and 1761, plans and occupation of Townshend were abandoned due to the impact of the French and Indian War. The grant had required the settlement of the town within five years, so in August 1762, Townshend was regranted under the same stipulations by Governor Wentworth. However, proprietors had already begun meeting again in 1761, and settlement of the town was led by proprietor John Hazeltine in May of that year.

The western boundary of New Hampshire was obscure, and there was controversy over whether the area around Townshend was under jurisdiction of the colony of New Hampshire or New York. In 1764, when King George III officially set the New Hampshire boundary at the western bank of the Connecticut River, proprietors of Townshend and nearby settlers were fearful of being charged twice for the same land. New York authorities only requested documents of confirmation for their latest land, and left the settlers free of charge.

The first farms were treated to fertile soil where they could grow wheat, corn, buckwheat, rye, oats, and barley, but were plagued by tree stumps that were too strongly rooted to be removed by primitive farm machinery. Potatoes, turnips, apples, pumpkins, corn, and maple syrup were other popular harvests. Cattle, sheep, and poultry were common livestock, but hogs were invaluable because of their simple maintenance and abundance of meat upon harvest. Several rivers provided substantial irrigation for farms, and by 1797, two sawmills and one fulling mill had been constructed along the rivers.

At the outbreak of the American Civil War, Townshend had a total population of 1,376, and approximately 120 men fought in the War. Volunteering to fight in the ranks of the Union Army was incentivized by cash bounties, which were set as high as $500 in 1862. Following the same trend that was taking place across Vermont, many Civil War veterans from Townshend left the state after their service. This emigration pattern reflected the desire of former soldiers to explore larger cities around the country, and led to the shrinking of the Vermont population and economy.

== Leland and Gray Union Middle and High School ==
Townshend's Middle and High School was founded as a private seminary in October 1834, making it one of the oldest Vermont secondary schools. The first building was raised on the east side of the village common, and was named Leland Seminary after Aaron Leland, a Baptist preacher from Chester, Vermont. The school gained the name Leland and Gray when a trustee of the seminary, Deacon Samuel Gray, gifted $800 because the school had been struggling to pay its debts. The two story brick building was destroyed by a fire in 1894, and an octagonal wooden building was immediately constructed as a replacement. As a private school, Leland and Gray Seminary enrolled students from across Vermont and even New England. Over time, several buildings near the school were used as dwelling houses and dormitories for students, and many local families allowed traveling students to live with them.

Leland and Gray Seminary offered a strict curriculum of the basics and classics, and upheld conservative principles of discipline, parental involvement, and dress codes. Hence, the transition to a tuition free public school in 1968 was a dramatic one for the townspeople. Under the new name Leland and Gray Union Middle and High School, the school adopted an open classroom philosophy, in which students could shape their curriculum to their interests and take advantage of a wide variety of electives. This transition divided the families of Townshend between those who preferred the more traditional style of learning, and those who supported the new education system. The resulting tension, which served as a microcosm of the national politics of the time, culminated with the departure of John Newton in 1977, who served as principal for eight years. Construction for the building that now serves as the school began in 1970, and cost nearly $2 million. Leland and Gray has more than 750 alumni.

== Geography ==
According to the United States Census Bureau, the town has a total area of 42.8 square miles (110.8 km^{2}), of which 42.7 square miles (110.6 km^{2}) is land and 0.1 square mile (0.2 km^{2}) (0.14%) is water. The West River flows through the town. The village of Townshend is in the south-central part of the town, and the community of Harmonyville is directly to the south. Both communities are in the valley of the West River.

== Demographics ==
Historical population
Census	Pop.	Note	%±
1790	676		—
1800	1,083		60.2%
1810	1,115		3.0%
1820	1,406		26.1%
1830	1,386		−1.4%
1840	1,345		−3.0%
1850	1,354		0.7%
1860	1,376		1.6%
1870	1,171		−14.9%
1880	1,099		−6.1%
1890	865		−21.3%
1900	833		−3.7%
1910	817		−1.9%
1920	786		−3.8%
1930	633		−19.5%
1940	694		9.6%
1950	584		−15.9%
1960	643		10.1%
1970	668		3.9%
1980	859		28.6%
1990	1,019		18.6%
2000	1,149		12.8%
2010	1,232		7.2%
2020	1,291		4.8%
U.S. Decennial Census

As of the census of 2000, there were 1,149 people, 469 households, and 319 families residing in the town. The population density was 26.9 people per square mile (10.4/km^{2}). There were 668 housing units at an average density of 15.6 per square mile (6.0/km^{2}). The racial makeup of the town was 97.82% White, 0.26% African American, 0.17% Native American, 0.26% Asian, 0.78% from other races, and 0.70% from two or more races. Hispanic or Latino of any race were 0.70% of the population.

There were 469 households, out of which 30.7% had children under the age of 18 living with them, 54.4% were married couples living together, 9.6% had a female householder with no husband present, and 31.8% were non-families. 25.2% of all households were made up of individuals, and 9.8% had someone living alone who was 65 years of age or older. The average household size was 2.39 and the average family size was 2.84.

In the town, the population was spread out, with 23.8% under the age of 18, 4.3% from 18 to 24, 28.8% from 25 to 44, 26.7% from 45 to 64, and 16.4% who were 65 years of age or older. The median age was 42 years. For every 100 females, there were 89.6 males. For every 100 females age 18 and over, there were 86.4 males.

The median income for a household in the town was $39,286, and the median income for a family was $41,759. Males had a median income of $31,667 versus $22,313 for females. The per capita income for the town was $19,431. About 7.9% of families and 8.8% of the population were below the poverty line, including 10.0% of those under age 18 and 4.1% of those age 65 or over.

== Health care ==
Grace Cottage Hospital is located in Townshend.

== Notable people ==
- Esther Dale, actress
- Castle Freeman Jr., author
- Peter W. Galbraith, ambassador to Croatia and the author of The End of Iraq
- Ernest Kinoy, American writer, screenwriter and playwright
- Clarina I. H. Nichols, journalist involved in temperance, abolition, and women's movement
- Alphonso Taft, Attorney General and Secretary of War under President Ulysses S. Grant
- Marshall H. Twitchell, Union Army captain and Reconstruction figure
- Attila Zoller, guitarist

== Townshend in popular culture ==
- H. P. Lovecraft's story "The Whisperer in Darkness" is set near Townshend.
- Funny Farm with Chevy Chase was filmed in Townshend. The film crew accidentally killed all but one of the maple trees on the Townshend Common when they "sprayed the trees with fire-retardant foam to create the illusion of snow", resulting in the re-planting of the trees. Today, the one tree that survived the damage sits in the middle of the Common, surrounded by much shorter, newer trees.
- Jodi Picoult's novel House Rules is set in Townshend.
- The band Phish played a three-set show with Giant Country Horns in Townshend at the Family Park on July 14, 1991.
