= University of Vermont Medical Center =

Medical service network

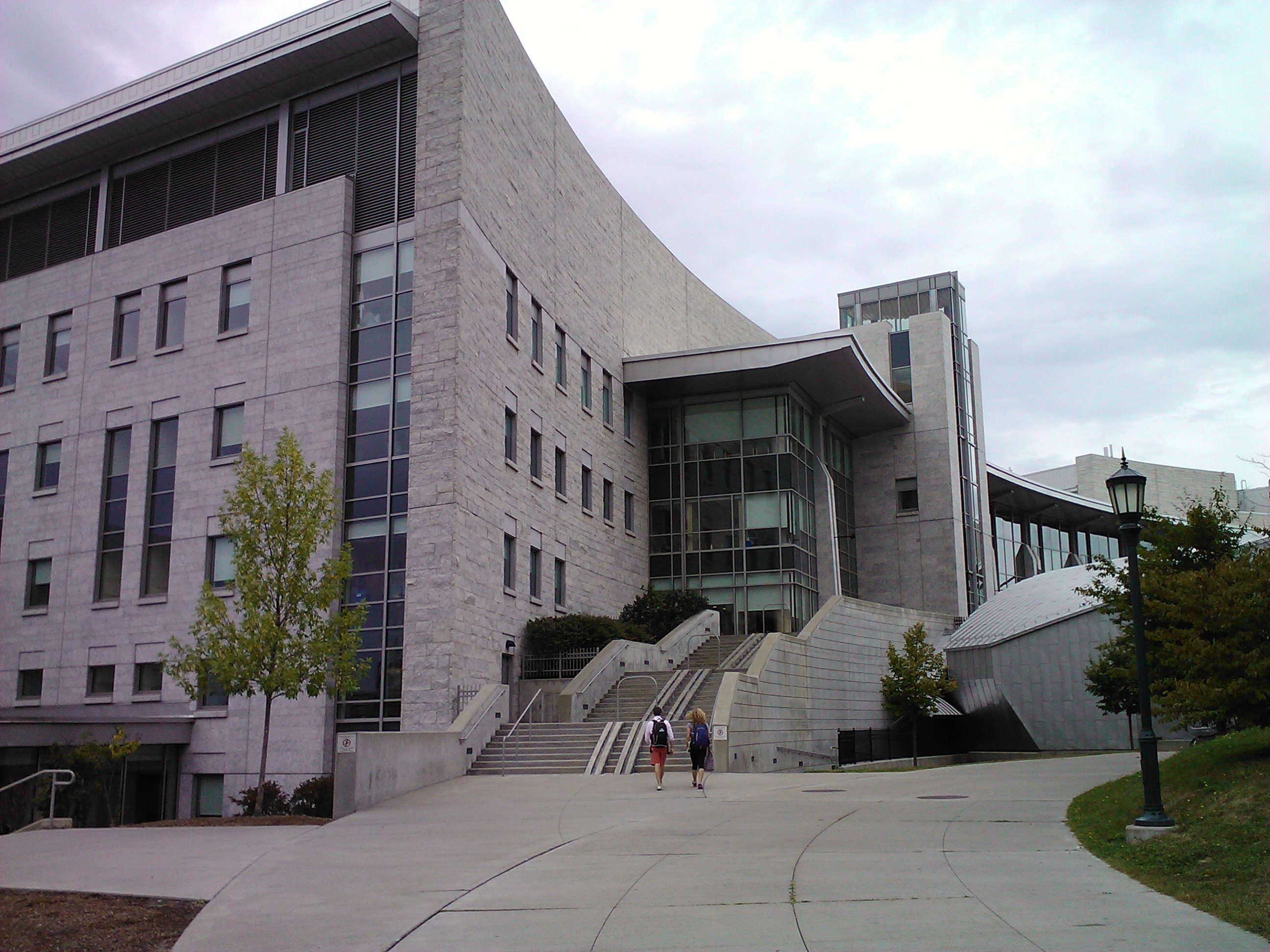
- UVM Medical Center Main Campus

Geography
- Location: 111 Colchester Avenue, Burlington, Vermont, U.S.
- Coordinates: 44.479794°N 73.194119°W

Organisation
- Type: Teaching
- Affiliated university: University of Vermont

Services
- Emergency department: Level I Adult Trauma Center / Level II Pediatric Trauma Center
- Beds: 620

Helipads
- Helipad: Yes (FAA LID: 67VT)

History
- Founded: 1879; 147 years ago

Links
- Website: www.uvmhealth.org/locations/university-of-vermont-medical-center

The University of Vermont Medical Center (UVMMC) is a five-campus academic medical facility under the corporate umbrella of the University of Vermont Health Network that is anchored by a 562-bed hospital in Burlington, Vermont. UVMMC is based in Burlington and serves as both a regional referral center (providing advanced care to approximately one million people in Vermont and northern New York) and a community hospital (for approximately 160,000 residents in the Chittenden and Grand Isle Vermont counties). The hospital was formerly known as the Medical Center Hospital of Vermont and later as Fletcher Allen Health Care until getting its current name. It is affiliated with the University of Vermont's Robert Larner College of Medicine and its College of Nursing and Health Sciences.

== Overview ==
The University of Vermont Medical Center ("UVM Medical Center") consists of four major campuses:

- Medical Center Campus, Burlington, a 562 licensed-bed facility that includes most inpatient services, the Vermont Children's Hospital, an emergency department, an outpatient pharmacy, and an Ambulatory Care Center for outpatient services.
- 1 South Prospect Street (formerly known as University Health Center), Burlington, includes outpatient services, pharmacy, laboratory, and radiology, and is near the main medical center campus and adjacent to the University of Vermont's main campus.
- Fanny Allen Campus, Colchester, includes inpatient rehab, a Walk-In Care Center, radiology, laboratory, pharmacy, outpatient rehab, physical therapy, work-related rehabilitation, occupational therapy, and speech-language pathology.
- Tilley Drive Campus, South Burlington, includes orthopedics, cardiology, physical therapy, sports rehabilitation, and diabetes support.

The organization also includes more than 30 patient-care sites and more than 100 outreach clinics, programs and services throughout Vermont and northern New York, including 11 primary care group practices, and generates approximately one billion in annual revenue. The UVM Medical Center is also affiliated, through the University of Vermont Health Network corporate umbrella, with Central Vermont Medical Center, Porter Medical Center, and the Visiting Nurse Association of Chittenden and Grand Isle, located in Vermont, as well as Champlain Valley Physicians Hospital, Alice Hyde Medical Center, and Elizabethtown Community Hospital, located in northern New York.

In 2012, the medical center's nearly 7,150 employees included 500 University of Vermont Medical Group physicians (jointly employed by the medical center and the UVM College of Medicine), more than 1750 registered nurses, 160 non-physician practice nurses and physician assistants, and approximately 300 residents (physicians in specialty training). The hospital offers 18 residency programs and 27 fellowship programs, and employs nearly a thousand volunteers throughout the hospital operations.

== Services and highlights ==
The University of Vermont Children's Hospital at the UVM Medical Center is a hospital-within-a-hospital. The UVM Children's Hospital offers comprehensive, family-centered primary care, specialty care, and neonatal and pediatric intensive care for children across the region. The 29-bed neonatal intensive care unit (NICU) is the only facility of its type in Vermont and cares for critically ill or premature infants.

The Clinical Research Center at the University of Vermont is one of 78 in the country and the only one in northern New England. Resident researchers are pioneering treatments for heart disease, cancer, Parkinson's disease, diabetes, and amyotrophic lateral sclerosis, or Lou Gehrig's disease.

The medical center has comprehensive surgical services (neurological, cardiac, pediatric) and imaging equipment. It offers leading-edge radiology technology including two Philips Ingenia 1.5T, a Philips Ingenia 3T MRI, a General Electric Signa LX 1.5 tesla system, and a Philips Brilliance 256-slice CT scanner that can produce highly detailed 3D images of the heart, the brain, and tiny blood vessels.

As the only Level I Trauma Center in Vermont, the hospital offers the region advanced technology and techniques to care for the most seriously ill and injured pediatric and adult patients. The hospital was the first organization in the United States to be verified as a Level I Trauma Center for both children and adults.

Two of Vermont Children's Hospital's pediatric specialties – pulmonology and gastroenterology – were cited as being among the best in the nation by U.S. News & World Report's "Best Children's Hospitals" list for 2012–2013.

Two years in a row, U.S. News & World Report has designated the medical center a Best Regional Hospital. The magazine also named twenty-one physicians to its Top Doctors list and recognized five specialties as High Performing for 2012–2013. Twelve of the physicians on the Top Doctors list were ranked in the best 1% of specialists in the nation.

Vermont's academic medical center was also selected for the U.S. News Most Connected list for the second consecutive year, indicating it is one of the leading hospitals in the nation in the adoption of electronic medical records.

The five specialty areas ranked as High Performing are Orthopedics, Neurology, Neurosurgery, Gynecology and Nephrology. To be included on this list, the quality of care must be on the same level as that provided by nationally ranked hospitals.

== History ==
=== Hospital merger ===
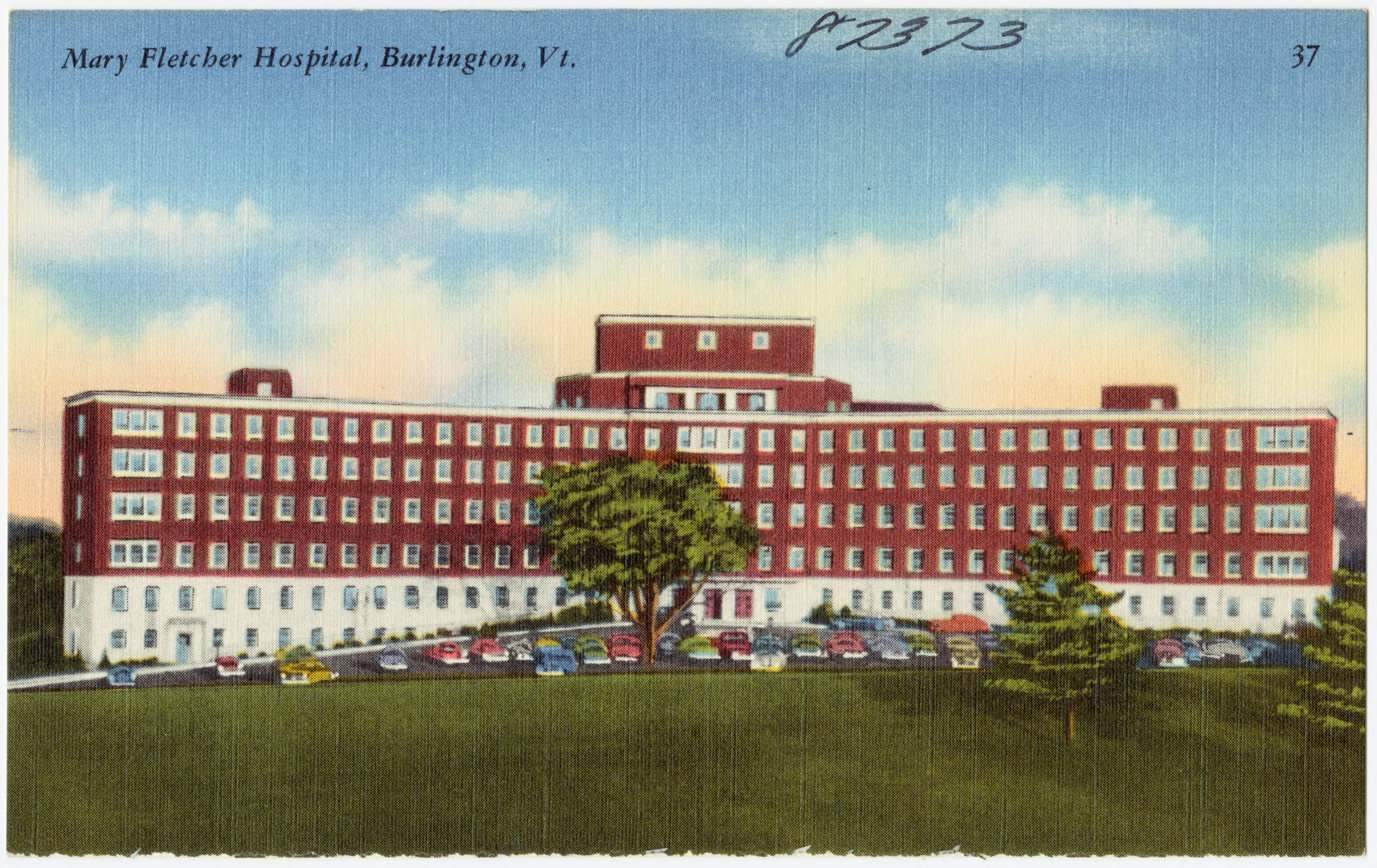
A postcard for the hospital when it was known as the Mary Fletcher Hospital.

The modern medical center, formerly known as Fletcher Allen Health Care, was formed in 1995 from the merger of three organizations:

- Medical Center Hospital of Vermont

Founded in Burlington in 1879, Mary Fletcher Hospital was the first hospital in Vermont. It was renamed Medical Center Hospital of Vermont in 1967 when it merged with Bishop DeGoesbriand Hospital.

- Fanny Allen Hospital

In 1894, the Religious Hospitallers of St. Joseph founded the Fanny Allen Hospital in Colchester. They named their hospital after Fanny Allen (daughter of Ethan Allen), a nun who nursed wounded American soldiers in the War of 1812. This site, now referred to as the Fanny Allen Campus, has an Urgent Care Center, Ambulatory Surgery Center and Rehabilitation unit.

- University Health Center

In 1971, ten medical specialty practice groups joined to form the University Health Center (UHC) at the site of the former Bishop DeGoesbriand Hospital (1924). Now referred to as 1 South Prospect Street, most of the ambulatory clinics moved to the Ambulatory Care Center in 2005 at the main campus.

=== Post-merger history ===
In 2010, the Faculty Practice became known as the University of Vermont Medical Group, formalized through a joint affiliation with the University of Vermont and Fletcher Allen Health Care. The Medical Group is governed by a Board of Directors comprising the chairs/Health Care Service leaders, elected at-large faculty representatives, the president of the Medical Group, the UVM College of Medicine Dean, and the University of Vermont Health Network chief executive officer.

=== The Renaissance Project ===
In 1999, responding to proposals from chief executive William C. Boettcher, the Vermont Department of Banking, Insurance, Securities and Health Care Administration (BISHCA) approved a $118 million plan called the Renaissance Project for new construction at Fletcher Allen. In 2001, the commission approved an amended proposal (also known as a Certificate of Need or CON) for $173 million. This second proposal was later described as "fraudulent" by the United States Attorney for the district including Vermont. This description was based on the fact that at the time Fletcher Allen management was maintaining two separate project budgets in an attempt to keep a major portion of the costs from BISHCA (specifically the cost of the parking garage). The final version of the proposal, approved in 2003, was $364 million. In the end, eight Fletcher Allen trustees resigned; the chief executive (CEO), chief financial (CFO) and chief operating officers (COO) resigned; the law firm retained by the hospital (Downs Rachlin Martin) agreed to pay $2 million in restitution and Fletcher Allen was fined $1 million.

In August 2006, David Cox, the former CFO, pleaded guilty to charges and admitted his role in the controversy.

As of 2007, four former executives have been charged with crimes associated with the project. The former CEO, William Boettcher, pleaded guilty and was sentenced to two years on federal conspiracy charges. David Demers, a former senior vice president for planning, also pleaded guilty to felony conspiracy charges. Thad Krupka, the former COO, pleaded guilty in state court to three counts of misdemeanor false claims.

=== Official name change ===
On Wednesday, November 13, 2014, Fletcher Allen Health Care's name officially changed to "The University of Vermont Medical Center," as well as Fletcher Allen Partners becoming "The University of Vermont Health Network."

== Hospital rating data ==
The HealthGrades website contains the clinical quality data for the University of Vermont Medical Center, as of 2017. For this rating section three different types of data from HealthGrades are presented: clinical quality ratings for twenty-eight inpatient conditions and procedures, thirteen patient safety indicators and the percentage of patients giving the hospital as a 9 or 10 (the two highest possible ratings).

For inpatient conditions and procedures, there are three possible ratings: worse than expected, as expected, better than expected. For this hospital the data for this category is:

- Worse than expected – 1
- As expected – 21
- Better than expected – 6

For patient safety indicators, there are the same three possible ratings. For this hospital safety indicators were rated as:

- Worse than expected – 2
- As expected – 5
- Better than expected – 6

72% of patients rated this hospital as a 9 or 10, and 69% of patients on average rank hospitals as a 9 or 10.

== See also ==
- Alice Hyde Medical Center, Malone, New York
- Elizabethtown Community Hospital, Elizabethtown, New York
