= Mt. Ascutney Hospital and Health Center =

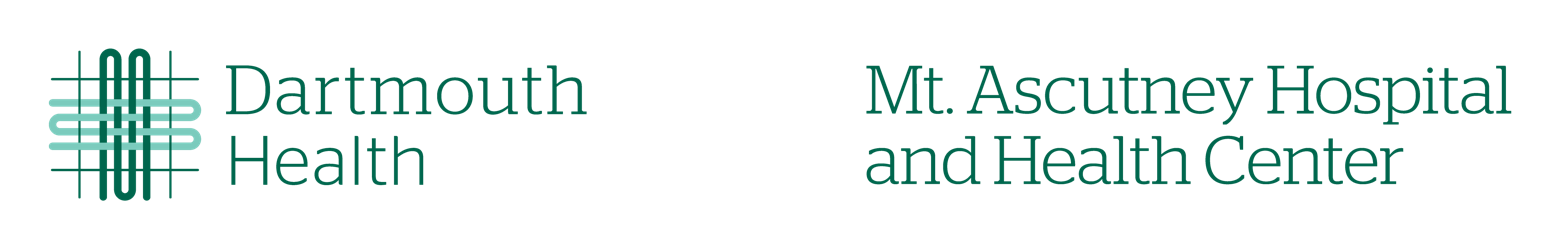

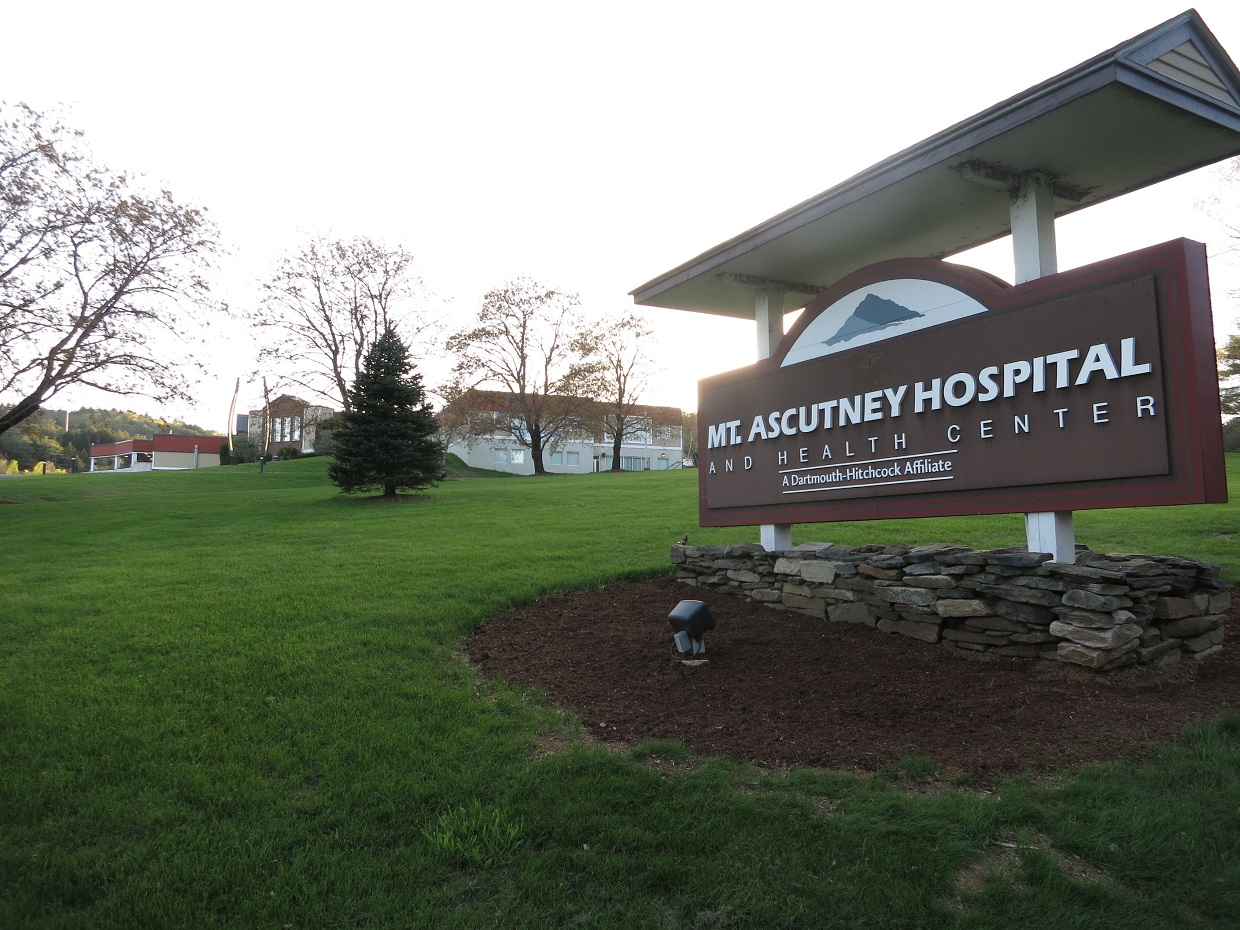
- Mt. Ascutney Hospital and Health Center sign and building

Geography
- Location: Windsor, Vermont, United States
- Coordinates: 43.487435°N 72.402992°W

Organization
- Funding: Non-profit hospital
- Type: Critical access hospital
- Affiliated university: Dartmouth–Hitchcock Medical Center

Services
- Emergency department: Yes
- Beds: 35 (25 acute, 10 inpatient rehab)

Helipads
- Helipad: Yes

History
- Opened: 1933

Links
- Website: www.mtascutneyhospital.org
- Lists: Hospitals in Vermont

Mt. Ascutney Hospital and Health Center is a Vermont-based, not-for-profit hospital network. Founded in 1933, the Hospital’s network includes the critical access-designated Mt. Ascutney Hospital and Historic Homes of Runnemede senior living community in Windsor, and Ottauquechee Health Center in Woodstock. Affiliated with Dartmouth Health, the Hospital provides people in Southern Windsor County in Vermont and Sullivan County in New Hampshire with primary care and specialty services, along with 25 inpatient beds, a therapeutic pool, and the 10 beds of the inpatient rehabilitation center.
