= Alice Hyde Medical Center =

New York (state) hospital system

Coordinates: 44°51′26″N 74°17′30″W

Geography
- Location: Malone, New York, United States

Organization
- Type: General

Services
- Beds: 76

History
- Opened: 1913

Links
- Lists: Hospitals in New York State

Alice Hyde Medical Center (Malone) is a 76-bed medical facility in upstate New York that also operates a nursing home.

== History ==
Alice Hyde Memorial Hospital opened in 1913; in 1999 they renamed to Alice Hyde Medical Center. Alice Hyde is part of University of Vermont Health Network (UVM) and a major local employer. They participate in contracting outside medical service, such as for upstate prisons.

The Alice Hyde Nursing Home opened in 1968. It has since been replaced with the 2015-opened The Alice Center, which has a separate assisted-living facility.

== Controversy: Capital case patients ==
On June 28, 2015, David Sweat, an escaped convicted murderer, was brought to the hospital after being shot by law enforcement searchers. His imprisonment was for killing an on-duty law enforcement officer.

That same day an 81 year old prisoner, "the longest-serving inmate in New York state," who had escaped capital punishment in 1962 by accepting a life sentence, was brought to the hospital after allegedly being given a deliberate overdose of medication not even prescribed for him. The hospital had written "accidental overdose" on his medical chart and his medical records were denied to him. A medical negligence case followed. He had killed a 14 year old girl.
