= Bellows Free Academy, St. Albans =

High school in St. Albans, Vermont, U.S.

Coordinates: 44.808079°N 73.082911°W

Bellows Free Academy St. Albans
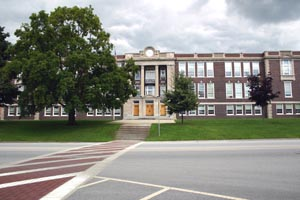
- Other names: The Academy, BFA
- Type: Public High School
- Established: 1930
- Principal: Polly Rico
- Location: St. Albans, VT, U.S.
- Colors: Green Gold
- Mascot: Bobwhites (boys) & Comets (girls)

Bellows Free Academy is a high school, grades 9-12, in St. Albans, Vermont, USA. BFA-St. Albans is the largest secondary school in Franklin County, Vermont. There were 987 students in attendance as of the 2014–2015 school year.

The school has two different campuses. The main campus consists of two buildings located in downtown St. Albans: BFA South and BFA North. BFA South is the original building and was built in 1930. BFA North was formerly the St. Albans Hospital and was sold to the school for one dollar when the hospital fully consolidated with the Northwestern Medical Center (opened in 1978) in 1996. Collins-Perley Sports Complex is home to most athletics at the academy, and is located just off exit 19 of I-89, about a mile and a half from the main campus. BFA St Albans, along with BFA Fairfax in neighboring Fairfax, VT, was founded in memory of Hiram Bellows with money from Railroad stocks that he left in a public school fund for after his death.

== Academics ==
There is no cost to attend BFA St. Albans, as it is a public school.

The school used to be semi-private, answering to its board of trustees rather than a public school board for over 60 years. Teens living within St. Albans City or Town areas could attend for free, but families outside the city or town limits could choose to attend BFA St. Albans and if their town had a high school they would pay for their tuition, if their town did not have a high school their home town would cover tuition, as they can attend any school within the state.

== Media ==
The Mercury is a monthly newspaper written, laid out, and published by the journalism students at the academy in association with The Saint Albans Messenger.

== Athletics ==
The namesake of the school's boys' teams is the Bobwhites, after longtime coach and athletic director Bob White. The girls' teams are known as the Comets, after longtime coach Dario "Doc" Comi. The boys and girls hockey teams, the softball team, girls basketball team, and the boys soccer team have collected state titles over the years. The boys varsity hockey team has won 16 state championship titles.All of the BFA athletic teams participate in Division I for sports, except girls lacrosse, and cheerleading which compete in Division II.

== Notable alumni ==
- Brett Adams, 1983, Athletic Director, Stevenson University (formerly Villa Julie College) since 1994, the school's 1st athletic director and men's basketball coach.
- Michael J. Colburn, Conductor of United States Marine Band "The President's Own"
- Dennis "Red" Gendron, former coach and teacher, General Manager at Grand Timber Lodge
- Matt Johnson, former professional basketball player
- John LeClair 1987, NHL All-Star hockey player and Olympian

== Sister School ==
- BFA-St. Albans' Sister school is located in Moss Point, Mississippi. BFA has, on more than one occasion, held fund raisers for the city, which was heavily damaged by Hurricane Katrina in 2005.
