= Royalton =

Royalton may refer to:

== Places ==
- Royalton, Illinois
- Royalton, Indiana
- Royalton, Kentucky
- Royalton, Minnesota
- Royalton, New York
- Royalton, Ohio
- Royalton, Pennsylvania
- Royalton, Vermont
- Royalton, Wisconsin, a town
- Royalton (community), Wisconsin, an unincorporated community
- Royalton Hotel in New York City
- Royalton Township (disambiguation)

== Other ==
- Arnold Royalton, a character in the Speed Racer film adaptation and his company Royalton Industries

== See also ==
- Royalston, Massachusetts
