= Weyauwega =

Weyauwega can refer to:

- Weyauwega, Wisconsin, a city in Waupaca County, Wisconsin, United States
- Weyauwega (town), Wisconsin, a town in Waupaca County, Wisconsin, United States
