= John O'Neill (Wisconsin politician) =

19th century American politician

Member of the Wisconsin State Assembly from the Lafayette 2nd district
- In office January 2, 1882 – January 5, 1885
- Preceded by: Thomas Bainbridge
- Succeeded by: Joseph A. Miller

Personal details
- Born: October 18, 1829 Douglastown, New Brunswick
- Died: May 12, 1914 (aged 84) Seymour, Lafayette County, Wisconsin, U.S.
- Cause of death: Stroke
- Resting place: Saint Matthews Catholic Cemetery, Shullsburg, Wisconsin
- Party: Democratic
- Spouse: none
- Children: none

John O'Neill (October 18, 1829 – May 12, 1914) was a Canadian American immigrant, miner, farmer, and Democratic politician. He served two terms in the Wisconsin State Assembly, representing western Lafayette County.

== Biography ==
John O'Neill was born in Douglastown, in Miramichi, New Brunswick, in 1829. In 1845, he emigrated with his parents and siblings to Lafayette County, in the Wisconsin Territory, where they all engaged in lead mining. In 1846, the family acquired a tract of land in the town of Seymour from the federal land office.

In 1852, he crossed the country with an ox team to California, where he remained for several years. Upon his return to Wisconsin in 1859, he engaged in farming and livestock raising.

He was a member of the Democratic Party and was elected chairman of the Shullsburg town board in 1872 and 1873. In 1881, he was elected to the Wisconsin State Assembly for Lafayette County's 2nd (western) Assembly district. He was subsequently re-elected in 1882. He did not run for a third term in 1884.

== Personal life ==
O'Neill never married and had no children. He retired from his farm in the 1890s and went to live in the care of his brother's family. His brother, Brien, preceded him in death, but his care continued under Brien's wife and children. For the last five years of his life he was completely blind. He suffered a stroke on the morning of Tuesday, May 12, 1914, and died that afternoon. His body was interred at Saint Matthews Catholic Cemetery in Shullsburg.

== Electoral history ==
=== Wisconsin Assembly (1881, 1882) ===
Wisconsin Assembly, Lafayette 2nd District Election, 1881
Party	Candidate	Votes	%	±%
General Election, November 8, 1881
Democratic	John O'Neill	863	61.78%	+12.15%
Republican	Addison A. Townsend	484	34.65%	−15.73%
Prohibition	Charles C. Kidder	50	3.58%	
Plurality		379	27.13%	+26.38%
Total votes		1,397	100.0%	-37.99%
Democratic gain from Republican				

Wisconsin Assembly, Lafayette 2nd District Election, 1882
Party	Candidate	Votes	%	±%
General Election, November 7, 1882
Democratic	John O'Neill (incumbent)	1,054	52.00%	−9.78%
Republican	George Proctor	928	45.78%	+11.14%
Prohibition	Francis Craig	45	2.22%	−1.36%
Plurality		126	6.22%	-20.91%
Total votes		2,027	100.0%	+45.10%
Democratic hold				

Wisconsin State Assembly
Preceded by Thomas Bainbridge	Member of the Wisconsin State Assembly from the Lafayette 2nd district January 2, 1882 – January 5, 1885	Succeeded by Joseph A. Miller
