= William Masters (politician) =

American politician

William H. Masters (August 14, 1820 – December 25, 1906) was an American farmer, pioneer, and politician.

Born in Norfolk, Litchfield County, Connecticut, Masters moved to Wisconsin Territory in 1845 and eventually settled on a farm in Weyauwega, Waupaca County, Wisconsin. Masters served as chairman of the Royalton Town Board. He also served on the Waupaca County Board of Supervisors and was chairman of the county board. Masters served as superintendent of the poor for Waupaca County. In 1887, Masters served in the Wisconsin State Assembly and was a Republican. Masters died suddenly on Christmas Day 1906, at his granddaughter's house in Fond du Lac, Wisconsin.
