= Gills Landing, Wisconsin =

- Unincorporated community
- Location within Wisconsin Location within the United States
- Coordinates: 44°18′10″N 88°53′00″W
- Country: United States
- State: Wisconsin
- County: Waupaca
- Elevation: 751 ft (229 m)
- Time zone: UTC-6 (Central (CST))
  - Summer (DST): UTC-5 (CDT)
- Area code: 920
- GNIS feature ID: 1577611

Gills Landing is an unincorporated community in the town of Weyauwega, Waupaca County, Wisconsin, United States. The community includes a campground as well as Gill's on the River, a bar and grill. It is situated on the Wolf River at its confluence with the Waupaca River at the eastern terminus of County Road F. Most of the community is part of Decker Memorial County Park. Some community roads are flooded during the spring, as the Wolf River can rise by as much as 14 feet at times.

== Education ==
Students living in Gills Landing attend the Weyauwega-Fremont School District.

== History ==
Founding

Gill's Landing was named for John Gill, who built the town in order to accommodate boat traffic, in 1843. A plank road was built to nearby Weyauwega in 1852.

Swing Bridge

In 1871, a swing bridge was built by Portage, Winnebago, and Superior Railway just north of Gill's Landing. Construction was finished on July 22, and the first train crossed the bridge on September 30. This project was one of the largest accomplishments of the railway and connected eastern and western Wisconsin. In 1902, a depot was built. This bridge is 1,292 feet long, and was the first railroad bridge built over the Wolf River. In 2010, a renovation to fix the swing bridge was completed.

Today

Today, the community has few residents and is more focused on tourism from businesses and the nearby boat landing.
