= Brandon State School =

- U.S. National Register of Historic Places
- U.S. Historic district
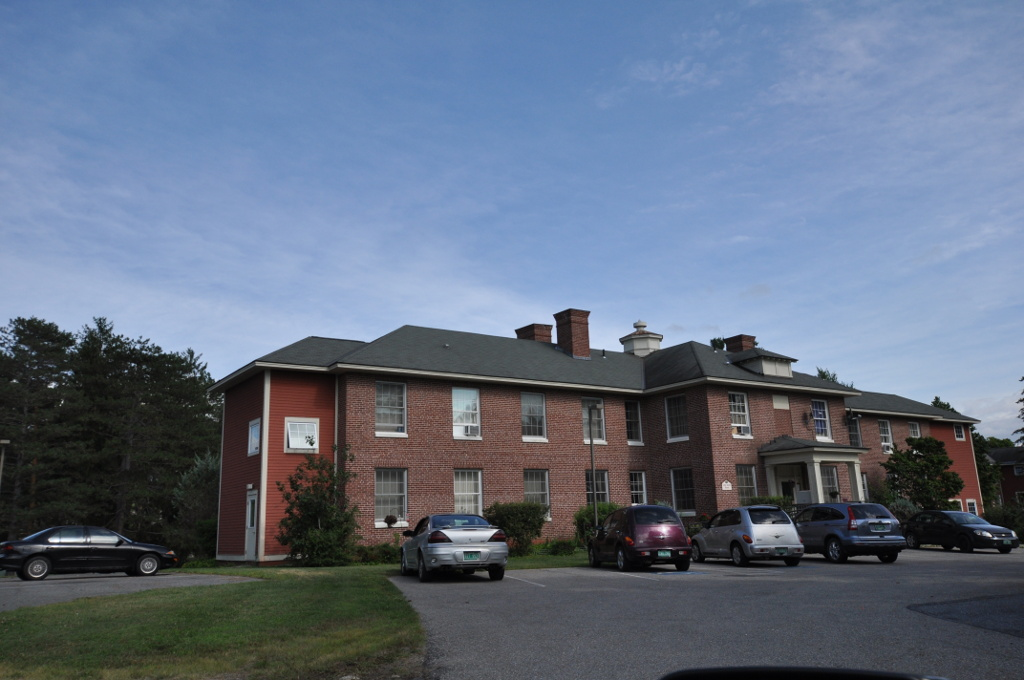

- Location within Vermont Location within the United States
- Location: Mulcahy and Jones Drives, Brandon, Vermont
- Coordinates: 43°48′42″N 73°6′30″W
- Area: 18 acres (7.3 ha)
- Built: 1915
- Built by: Cummings, H.P., Construction Co.
- Architect: Austin, Frank Lyman
- Architectural style: Colonial Revival
- NRHP reference No.: 99001346
- Added to NRHP: November 12, 1999

The Brandon State School, also known historically as the Brandon Training School and the Vermont State School for Feeble Minded Children, was a psychiatric facility for the care and treatment of children in Brandon, Vermont. Founded in 1915, it was Vermont's first state-funded residential facility for the care of the mentally handicapped. It was closed in 1993, a consequence of changing policies in the treatment and care of such individuals. The surviving buildings of the property, now converted to other uses, were listed on the National Register of Historic Places in 1999.

== History ==
The school was established as the Vermont State School for Feeble Minded Children by an act of the state legislature in 1912, and was formally opened in 1915 on this campus, which then consisted of 300 acres (120 ha) purchased from the estate of Henry Watson, located west of U.S. Route 7 about one mile northwest of Brandon village. In 1917 the state authorized the construction of a dormitory, along with an administration building and a service building, and developed plans for additional facilities. By the late 1930s, the school, renamed the Brandon State School in 1929, had four dormitories, classroom buildings, and other support facilities. The school was again renamed, to the Brandon Training School, in 1956.

In the late 1960s and 1970s, federal requirements forced the school to increase employee/student ratios, and resulted in a gradual shift in treatment of mentally handicapped youth to smaller group home settings scattered across the state. Raymond Mulcahy, who was the Superintendent during this time period, was a strong advocate for de-institutionalization and was a positive force for change for the patients at Brandon Training School. Under his leadership, the Training School began to place more and more residents into community housing. The school was permanently closed in 1993. The school's campus, many of its buildings handsome Colonial Revival structures designed by Burlington architect Frank Lyman Austin, have since been repurposed into apartments and commercial facilities.

== See also ==
- National Register of Historic Places listings in Rutland County, Vermont
- Brattleboro Retreat
- Vermont State Hospital
