= Lorenzo L. Post =

American politician

Lorenzo L. Post was a member of the Wisconsin State Assembly.

== Biography ==
Post was born on January 3, 1821, in Thetford, Vermont. After residing in the Town of Shullsburg in Lafayette County, Wisconsin, he moved to the Town of Weyauwega in Waupaca County, Wisconsin in 1851.

== Career ==
Post was a member of the Assembly in 1878 and 1879. Other positions he held include Chairman of the county board of supervisors of Waupaca County, Wisconsin. He was a Democrat.
