= Shullsburg (town), Wisconsin =

Shullsburg, Wisconsin
- Town
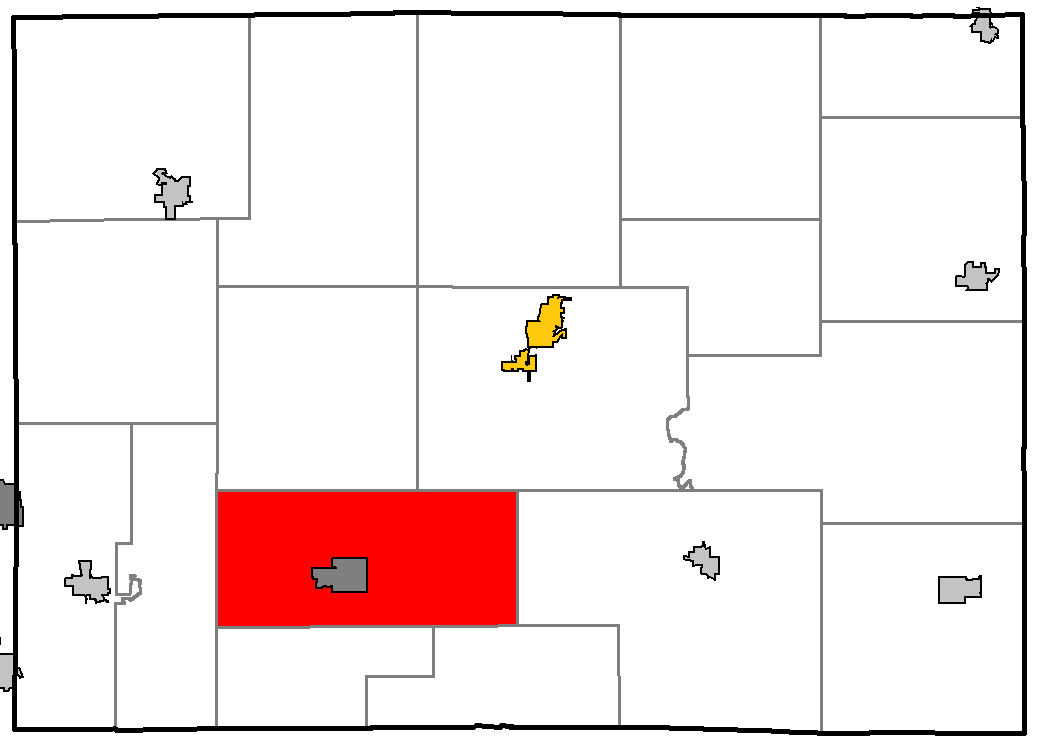
- Location of Shullsburg, within Lafayette County, Wisconsin

- Location of Lafayette County, Wisconsin

- Location within Wisconsin Location within the United States
- Coordinates: 42°34′50″N 90°14′6″W
- Country: United States
- State: Wisconsin
- County: Lafayette

Area
  - Total: 34.76 sq mi (90.04 km^{2})
  - Land: 34.76 sq mi (90.04 km^{2})
  - Water: 0 sq mi (0.0 km^{2})
- Elevation: 981 ft (299 m)

Population (2020)
  - Total: 312
  - Density: 8.97/sq mi (3.47/km^{2})
- Time zone: UTC-6 (CST)
  - Summer (DST): UTC-5 (CDT)
- ZIP Code: 53586
- Area code: 608
- FIPS code: 55-73850
- GNIS feature ID: 1584158

Shullsburg is a town in Lafayette County, Wisconsin, United States. The population was 312 at the 2020 census. The city of Shullsburg is located within the town but is separate from it. The unincorporated community of Dunbarton is located partially in the town.

== History ==
Shullsburg was established in 1827. The town was named after Jesse W. Shull. His mine is now part of the Badger Mine and Museum, a tourist attraction.

== Geography ==
The town is in southern Lafayette County, southwest of Darlington, the county seat. According to the United States Census Bureau, the town of Shullsburg has a total area of 34.7 square miles (90.0 km^{2}), all of it land.

== Demographics ==
Historical population
Census	Pop.	Note	%±
2000	364		—
2010	354		−2.7%
2020	312		−11.9%

As of the census of 2000, there were 364 people, 136 households, and 102 families residing in the town. The population density was 10.4 people per square mile (4.0/km^{2}). There were 143 housing units at an average density of 4.1 per square mile (1.6/km^{2}). The racial makeup of the town was 98.63% White, 0.55% Native American, 0.27% Asian, and 0.55% from two or more races.

There were 136 households, out of which 31.6% had children under the age of 18 living with them, 64.7% were married couples living together, 6.6% had a female householder with no husband present, and 24.3% were non-families. 19.1% of all households were made up of individuals, and 8.1% had someone living alone who was 65 years of age or older. The average household size was 2.68 and the average family size was 3.06.

In the town, the population was spread out, with 26.1% under the age of 18, 8.8% from 18 to 24, 26.9% from 25 to 44, 22.0% from 45 to 64, and 16.2% who were 65 years of age or older. The median age was 37 years. For every 100 females, there were 112.9 males. For every 100 females age 18 and over, there were 106.9 males.

The median income for a household in the town was $30,682, and the median income for a family was $38,750. Males had a median income of $21,827 versus $23,958 for females. The per capita income for the town was $15,096. About 7.3% of families and 10.8% of the population were below the poverty line, including 14.1% of those under age 18 and 5.8% of those age 65 or over.

== Notable people ==
- John O'Neill, Wisconsin state representative
- Lorenzo L. Post, Wisconsin state representative
- A. A. Townsend (1811–1879), founder of Rough and Ready, California
