= Berlin, Vermont =

Town in Vermont, United States

- Town
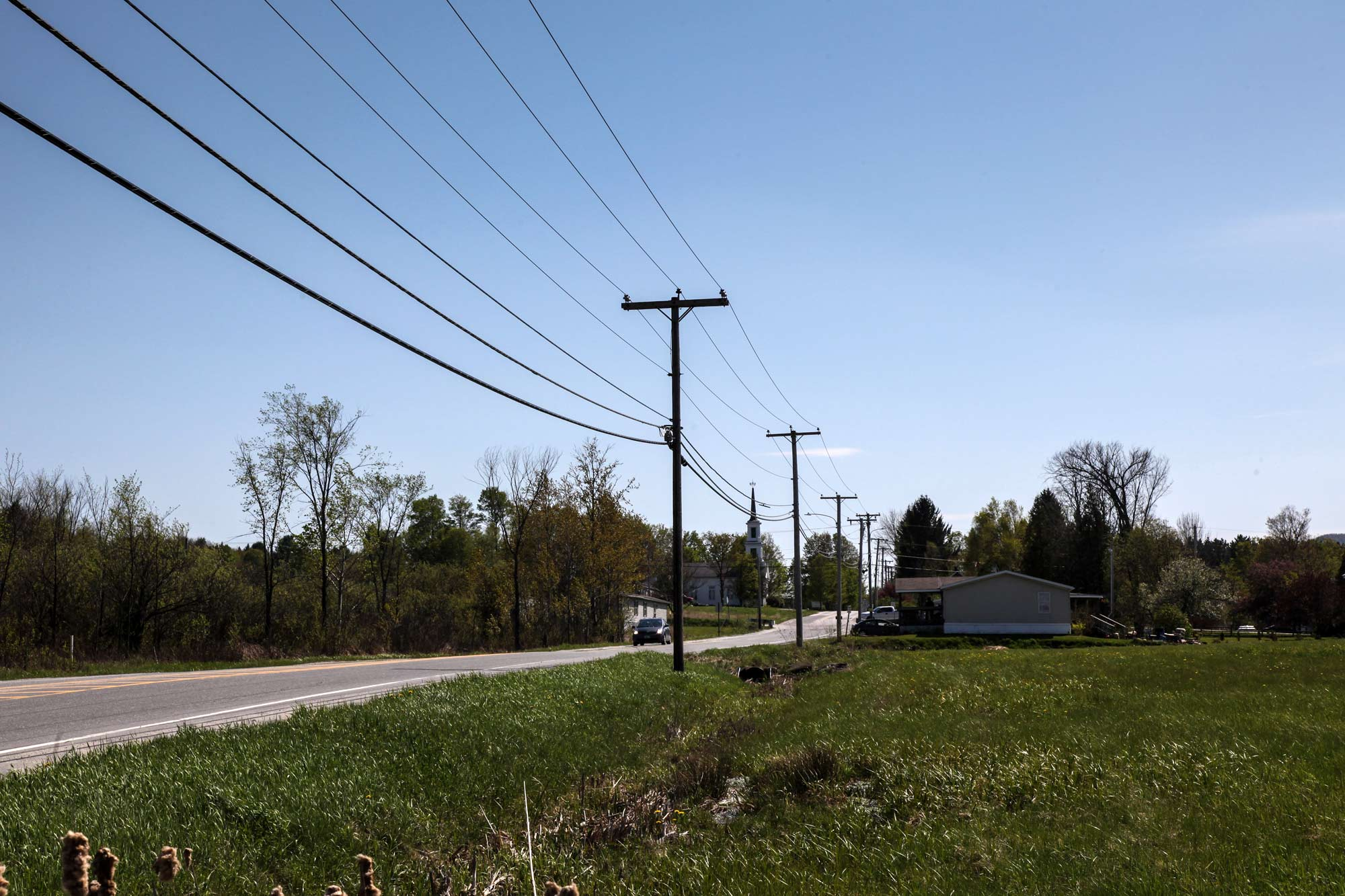
- "Berlin Corner", with the Congregational church on the hilltop

- Seal

- Location in Washington County and the state of Vermont
- Coordinates: 44°13′45″N 72°37′20″W
- Country: United States
- State: Vermont
- County: Washington
- Communities: Berlin Corners; Montpelier Junction; West Berlin

Area
  - Total: 36.9 sq mi (95.7 km^{2})
  - Land: 36.3 sq mi (93.9 km^{2})
  - Water: 0.66 sq mi (1.7 km^{2})
- Elevation: 1,270 ft (390 m)

Population (2020)
  - Total: 2,849
  - Density: 78.6/sq mi (30.3/km^{2})
- Time zone: UTC-5 (Eastern (EST))
  - Summer (DST): UTC-4 (EDT)
- ZIP Codes: 05602 (Berlin); 05641 (Barre); 05663 (Northfield)
- Area code: 802
- FIPS code: 50-05650
- GNIS feature ID: 1462042
- Website: berlinvt.gov

Berlin (/ˈbɜːrlɪn/ BUR-lin) is a town in Washington County, Vermont, United States, founded in 1763.

The population was 2,849 at the 2020 census. Being the town between Barre and Montpelier, the two largest cities in the region, much of the commercial business of the region can be found in Berlin, including parts of the Barre-Montpelier Road (U.S. Route 302), and the Berlin Mall.

== History ==
Berlin was chartered June 8, 1763. The name refers to Berlin, Germany, and was the only German town name in this new English colony. The grantees who received the 70 original rights to the township were priests, merchants and judges. The charter was issued by the Royal Governor of New Hampshire, Benning Wentworth, and stated that each "proprietor, settler or inhabitant" should pay one ear of Indian corn for each acre of land, and after ten years, one shilling for each 100 acres.

It took 22 years until the first settlers arrived in the area: Ebenezer Sanborn coming from nearby Corinth, founding the "Bradford farm", and Joseph Thurber from New Hampshire, founding the "Shepard farm". Both left a year later for New York state.

In 1788 a legislature of the state of Vermont stated that "the town of Randolph, Braintree, Brookfield, Roxbury, Williamstown, Northfield, Wildersburgh, Berlin and Montpelier [...] hereby are formed into one entire probate district, by the name of the district of Randolph."

Jacob Fowler, a hunter, was the first settler who stayed and left descendants in town. Other early settlers were Moses Smith, Daniel Morse, John Lathrop, and Hezekiah Silloway. In 1789 thirteen families lived in Berlin, and eight more in 1790. The first child born in Berlin was Abigail Black (1789).

The first town meeting was held on March 31, 1791. The first sawmill was built in the same year, the first school (on East Street) in 1794. The first Christian institution was founded in 1798, with James Hobart as its minister. A Congregational meeting house opened at Berlin center in 1803. After it burned down in 1838 the Congregational Church was built at Berlin Corner.

The first store and tavern opened c. 1800 and closed in 1850.

== Geography ==
According to the United States Census Bureau, the town has a total area of 36.9 square miles (95.7 km^{2}), of which 36.3 square miles (93.9 km^{2}) is land and 0.66 square miles (1.7 km^{2}), or 1.81%, is water.

== Demographics ==
Historical population
Census	Pop.	Note	%±
1790	134		—
1800	684		410.4%
1810	1,067		56.0%
1820	1,455		36.4%
1830	1,664		14.4%
1840	1,598		−4.0%
1850	1,507		−5.7%
1860	1,545		2.5%
1870	1,474		−4.6%
1880	1,380		−6.4%
1890	1,514		9.7%
1900	1,021		−32.6%
1910	1,079		5.7%
1920	959		−11.1%
1930	992		3.4%
1940	1,111		12.0%
1950	1,158		4.2%
1960	1,306		12.8%
1970	2,050		57.0%
1980	2,454		19.7%
1990	2,561		4.4%
2000	2,864		11.8%
2010	2,887		0.8%
2020	2,849		−1.3%
U.S. Decennial Census

As of the census of 2000, there were 2,864 people, 1,109 households, and 774 families residing in the town. The population density was 78.5 people per square mile (30.3/km^{2}). There were 1,172 housing units at an average density of 32.1 per square mile (12.4/km^{2}). The racial makeup of the town was 96.82% White, 0.17% African American, 0.24% Native American, 0.52% Asian, 0.03% from other races, and 2.20% from two or more races. Hispanic or Latino of any race were 0.66% of the population.

There were 1,109 households, out of which 33.3% had children under the age of 18 living with them, 54.9% were couples living together and joined in either marriage or civil union, 10.3% had a female householder with no husband present, and 30.2% were non-families. 23.2% of all households were made up of individuals, and 10.5% had someone living alone who was 65 years of age or older. The average household size was 2.46 and the average family size was 2.88.

In the town, the population was spread out, with 23.5% under the age of 18, 6.0% from 18 to 24, 27.1% from 25 to 44, 26.5% from 45 to 64, and 16.9% who were 65 years of age or older. The median age was 41 years. For every 100 females, there were 91.1 males. For every 100 females age 18 and over, there were 88.2 males.

The median income for a household in the town was $42,014, and the median income for a family was $52,895. Males had a median income of $31,703 versus $26,210 for females. The per capita income for the town was $20,312. About 6.0% of families and 7.1% of the population were below the poverty line, including 9.1% of those under age 18 and 7.5% of those age 65 or over.

== Government ==
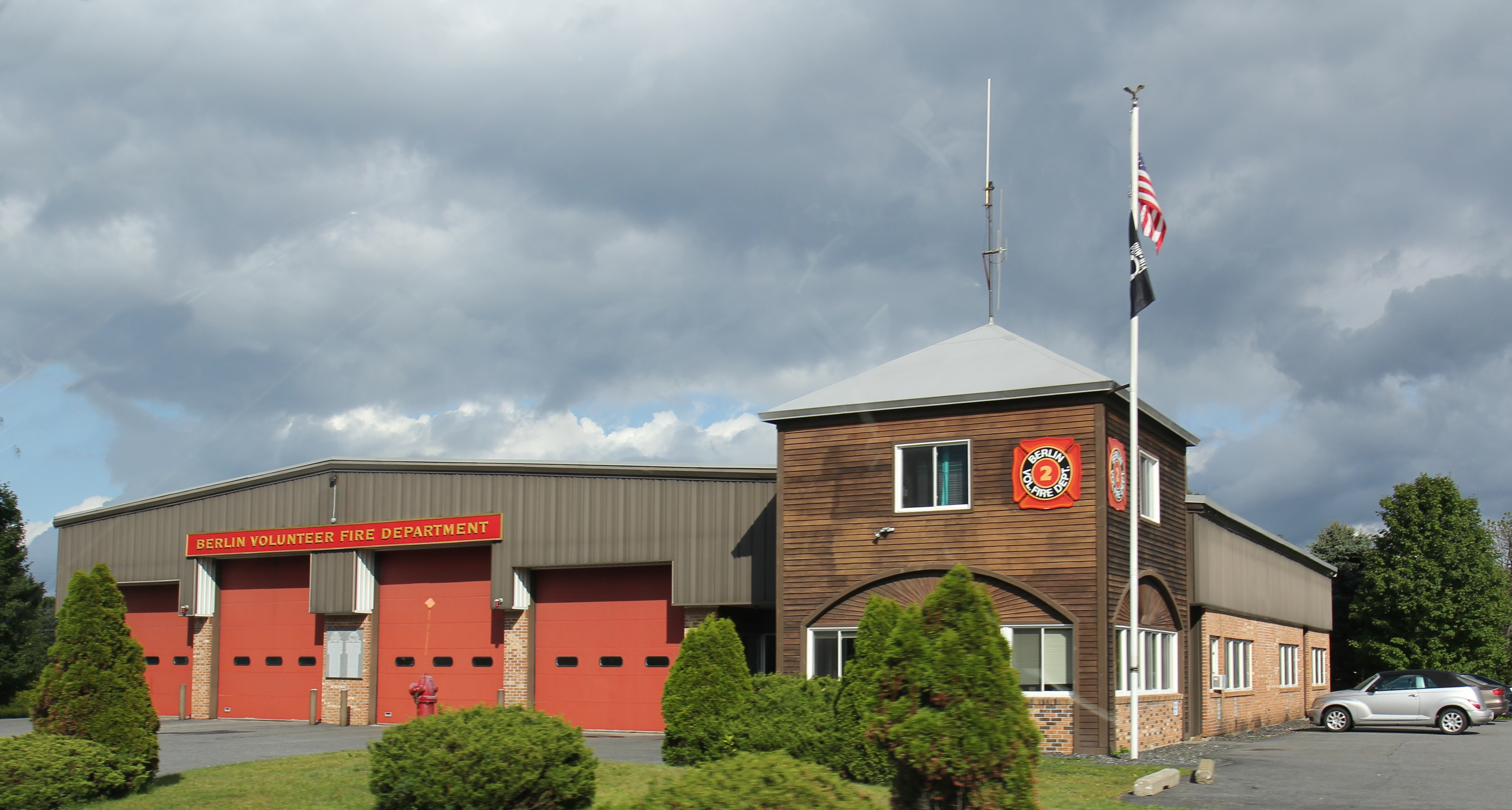
The Volunteer Fire Department for Berlin

Government buildings in Berlin include the headquarters of the Vermont Lottery Commission.

Berlin is the muster point for the 3rd Battalion of the Vermont State Guard, based out of the Vermont National Guard Armoury.

== Transportation ==
Edward F. Knapp State Airport is in Berlin. Montpelier Junction train station is in Berlin on Junction Road.

== Retail ==
Parts of Berlin are easily accessible from both Montpelier and Barre, and as such, many of the area's national chain stores are located there. The main shopping center in Berlin is the Berlin Mall, a small enclosed shopping mall. At 330,000 square feet (31,000 m^{2}), it is Vermont's third biggest mall, with over 25 shops. There are also several strip malls along the Barre-Montpelier Road that are home to supermarkets, sit-down and fast-food restaurants, including the Wayside Restaurant, and car dealerships.

== Hospitals ==
Central Vermont Medical Center, with 122 inpatient beds, is the primary health care provider for 66,000 people in central Vermont. The state psychiatric hospital, Vermont Psychiatric Care Hospital, is also located in the town, having replaced the Vermont State Hospital in Waterbury following its flooding and closure in 2011 after Tropical Storm Irene.

== Library ==
Midstate Regional Library is one of two state operated regional libraries operated by the Vermont Department of Libraries, the other being Northeast Regional Library in St. Johnsbury. The Midstate Regional Library is now closed and the Berlin Barracks of the Vermont State Police are now in that space.

== Notable people ==
- Eliada W. Brown, member of the Wisconsin State Assembly
- Merton Brown, composer
- Murdock A. Campbell, Adjutant General of the Vermont National Guard
- Thomas H. Cave, Vermont State Treasurer
- Julius Yemans Dewey, business executive and father of George Dewey
- Ira Hobart Evans, Medal of Honor recipient during the American Civil War, Speaker of the Texas House of Representatives
- Timothy Dwight Hobart, Texas rancher
- Chauncey L. Knapp, United States Representative from Massachusetts
- Clarence H. Pitkin, U.S. Attorney for Vermont and Washington County State's Attorney
- Phil Scott, Governor of Vermont

== Gallery ==
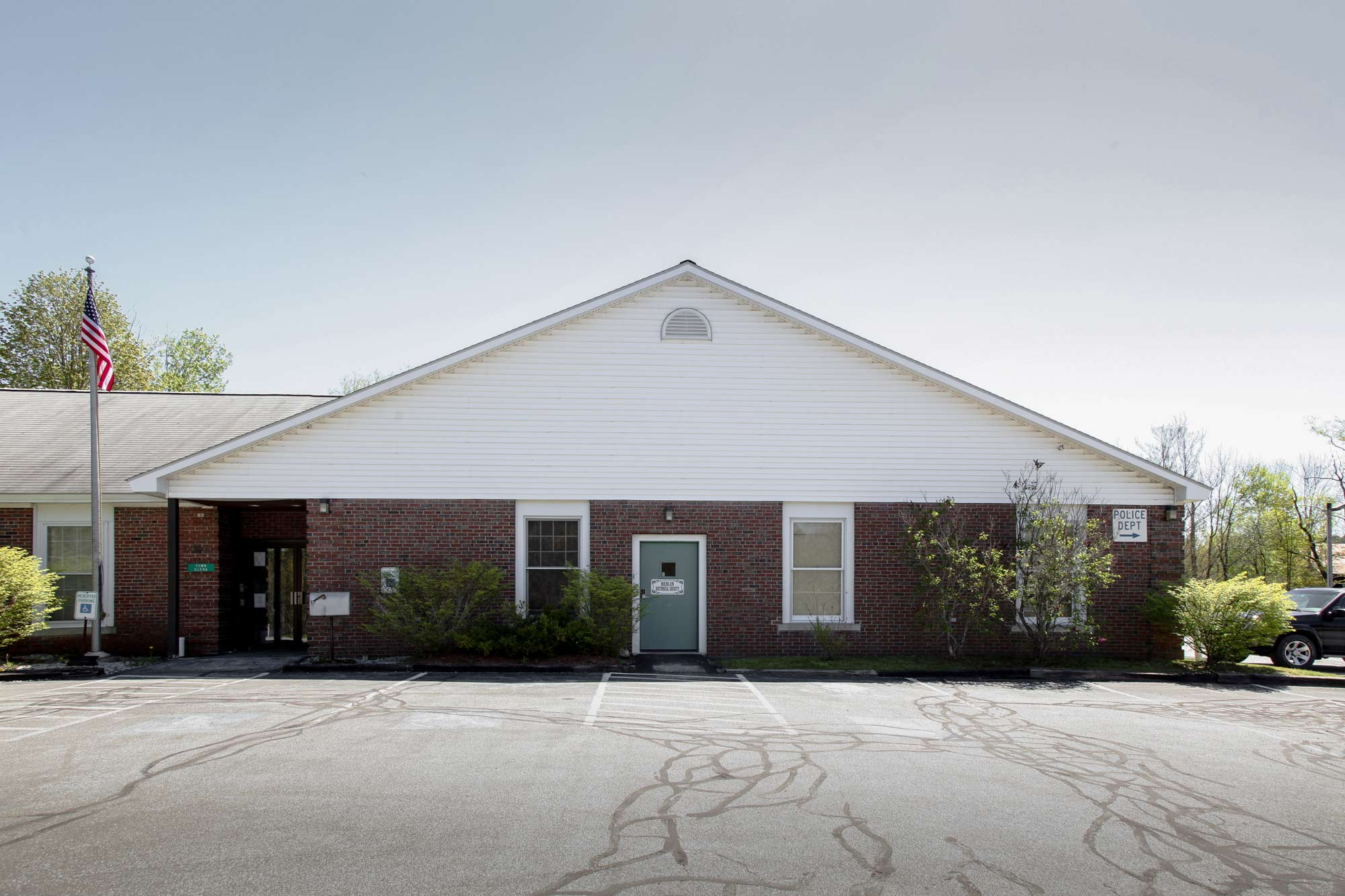
Berlin community building with town clerk, historical society and police station

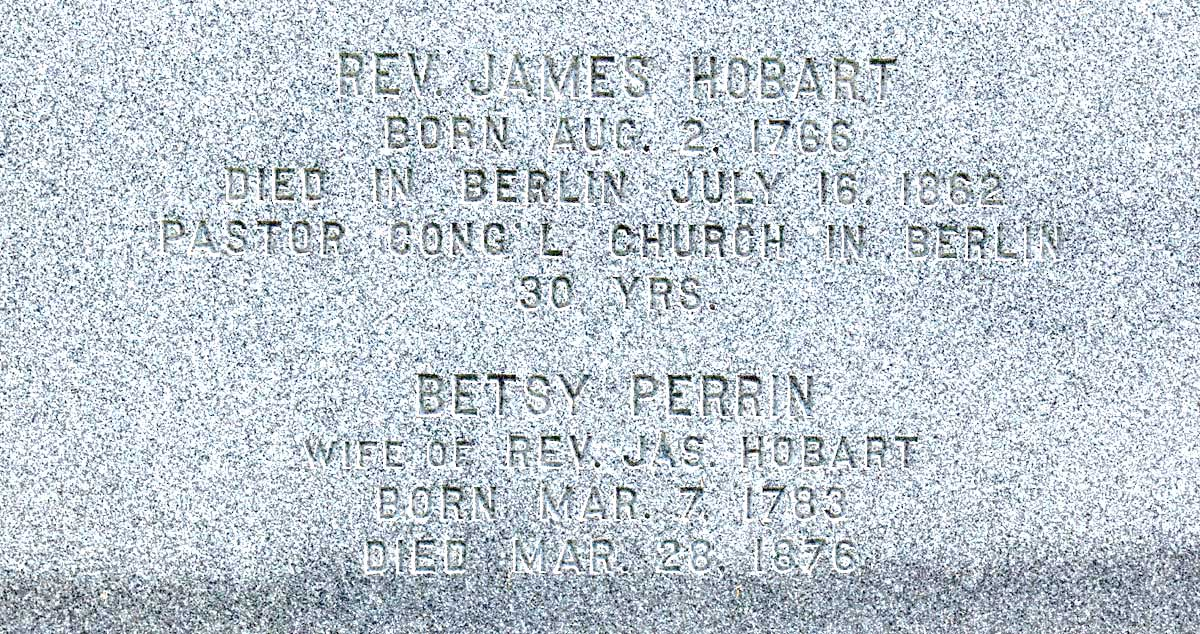
Gravestone of the first christian minister in town, James Hobart (1766–1862)

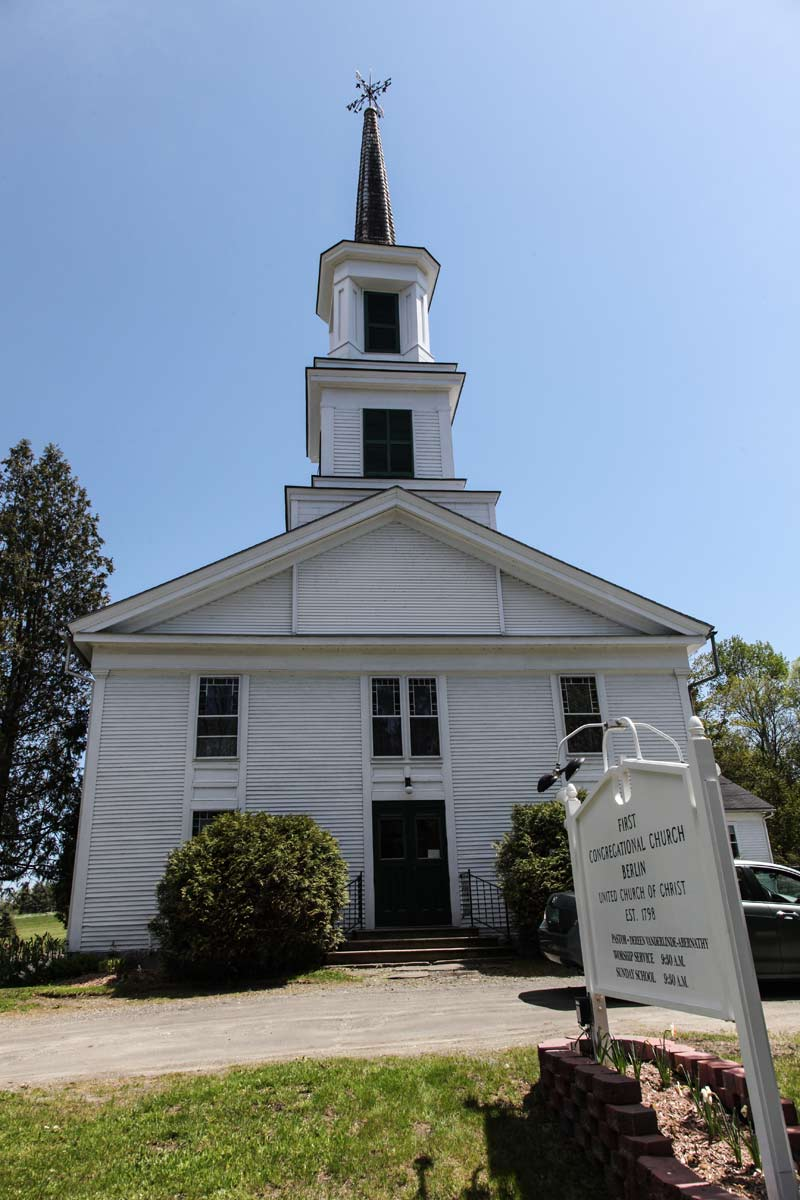
The Congregational Church at Berlin Corner

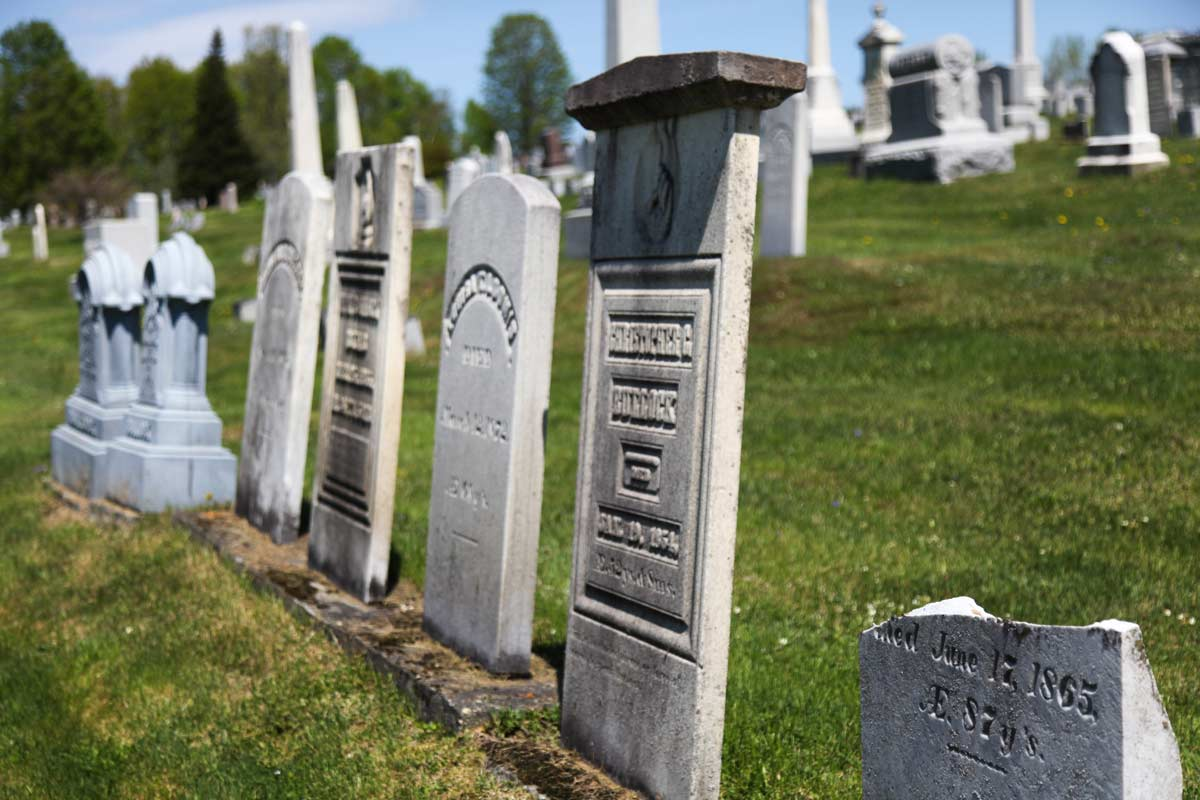
Berlin Cemetery
