= George S. Merry =

American politician

Member of the South Dakota House of Representatives from the 10th district
- In office 1921–1922

Personal details
- Born: June 7, 1863 Weyauwega, Wisconsin, US
- Died: May 15, 1935 Dell Rapids, South Dakota, US
- Party: Republican
- Spouse: Anna Lydia Jackson
- Relations: William E. Merry (brother)

George S. Merry (June 7, 1863 – May 15, 1935) was an American politician who served as a member of the South Dakota House of Representatives from 1921 until 1922.

== Background ==
Merry was born George Schuyler Merry on June 7, 1863, in Weyauwega, Wisconsin. His brother, William E. Merry, served as a member of the South Dakota Senate. George Merry served as a member of the South Dakota House of Representatives from 1921 to 1922. He was a Republican.

=== Personal life ===
On January 27, 1892, Merry married Anna Lydia Jackson. She died in 1912. He later married Nellie G. Adcock on June 1, 1921. Merry died on May 15, 1935, in Dell Rapids, South Dakota.
