= Harrison, Waupaca County, Wisconsin =

Harrison, Wisconsin
- Town
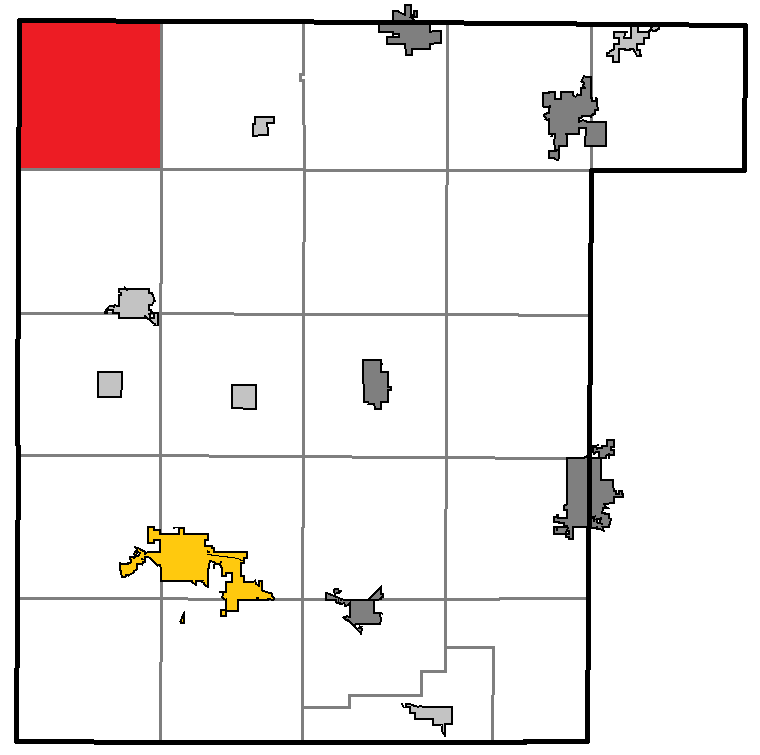
- Location of Harrison, within Waupaca County
- Coordinates: 44°37′46″N 89°9′46″W
- Country: United States
- State: Wisconsin
- County: Waupaca

Area
  - Total: 36.9 sq mi (95.7 km^{2})
  - Land: 36.9 sq mi (95.5 km^{2})
  - Water: 0.077 sq mi (0.2 km^{2})
- Elevation: 1,063 ft (324 m)

Population (2020)
  - Total: 459
  - Density: 12.4/sq mi (4.81/km^{2})
- Time zone: UTC-6 (Central (CST))
  - Summer (DST): UTC-5 (CDT)
- FIPS code: 55-32925
- GNIS feature ID: 1583358
- Website: www.townharrisonwi.org

Harrison is a town in Waupaca County, Wisconsin, United States. The population was 459 at the 2020 census. The unincorporated communities of Northland, Norske, and Schmidt Corner are located in the town.

== Geography ==
According to the United States Census Bureau, the town has a total area of 36.9 square miles (95.7 km^{2}), of which 36.9 square miles (95.5 km^{2}) is land and 0.1 square mile (0.2 km^{2}) (0.16%) is water.

== Demographics ==
As of the census of 2000, there were 509 people, 206 households, and 147 families residing in the town. The population density was 13.8 people per square mile (5.3/km^{2}). There were 303 housing units at an average density of 8.2 per square mile (3.2/km^{2}). The racial makeup of the town was 99.02% White, 0.20% Native American, 0.20% Asian, 0.20% from other races, and 0.39% from two or more races. Hispanic or Latino of any race were 1.18% of the population.

There were 206 households, out of which 27.2% had children under the age of 18 living with them, 56.8% were married couples living together, 6.8% had a female householder with no husband present, and 28.6% were non-families. 22.3% of all households were made up of individuals, and 9.2% had someone living alone who was 65 years of age or older. The average household size was 2.47 and the average family size was 2.86.

In the town, the population was spread out, with 23.6% under the age of 18, 5.3% from 18 to 24, 27.7% from 25 to 44, 26.3% from 45 to 64, and 17.1% who were 65 years of age or older. The median age was 41 years. For every 100 females, there were 111.2 males. For every 100 females age 18 and over, there were 112.6 males.

The median income for a household in the town was $36,635, and the median income for a family was $48,036. Males had a median income of $35,625 versus $19,432 for females. The per capita income for the town was $18,409. About 1.5% of families and 3.3% of the population were below the poverty line, including none of those under age 18 and 8.3% of those age 65 or over.
