= Vermont State Hospital =

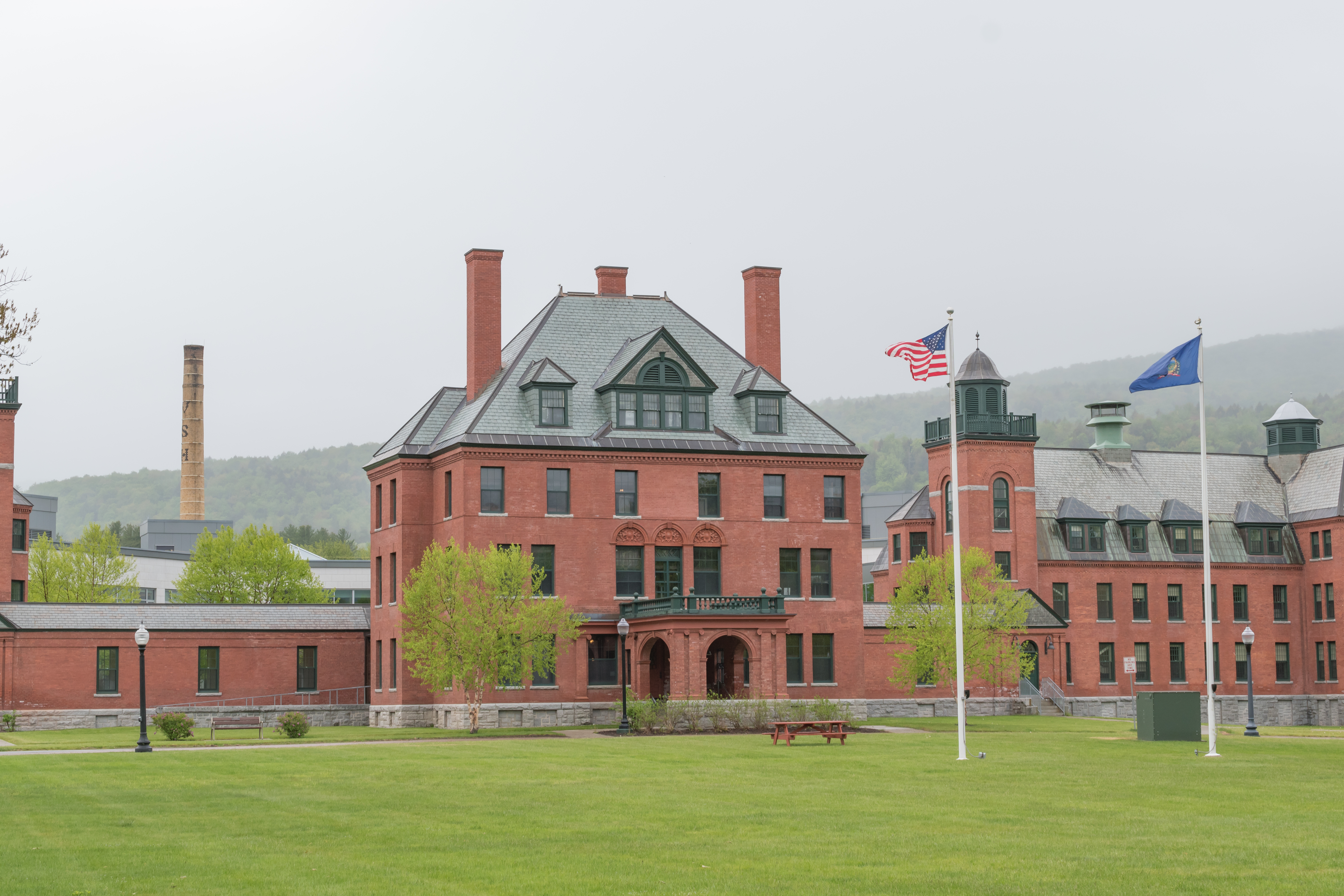
- Operating as the Waterbury State Office Complex, 2023

Geography
- Location: 103 South Main Street, Waterbury, Vermont, United States
- Coordinates: 44.331816°N 72.750548°W

Organization
- Type: Specialist

Services
- Beds: 54
- Speciality: Psychiatric

History
- Founded: 1891
- Closed: 2011

Links
- Website: Archived website
- Vermont State Hospital Historic District
- U.S. National Register of Historic Places
- U.S. Historic district
- Area: 36.3 acres (14.7 ha)
- Architect: Rand and Taylor; Charles Wyman Buckham; Payson Rex Webber; et al.
- Architectural style: Late Victorian, Colonial Revival, Classical Revival
- NRHP reference No.: 16000765
- Added to NRHP: November 8, 2016
- Lists: Hospitals in Vermont

Vermont State Hospital, alternately known as the Vermont State Asylum for the Insane and the Waterbury Asylum, was a mental institution built in 1890 in Waterbury, Vermont to help relieve overcrowding at the privately run Vermont Asylum for the Insane in Brattleboro, Vermont, now known as the Brattleboro Retreat. Originally intended to treat the criminally insane, the hospital eventually took in patients with a wide variety of problems, including mild to severe mental disabilities, epilepsy, depression, alcoholism and senility. The hospital campus, much of which now houses other state offices as the Waterbury State Office Complex, was listed on the National Register of Historic Places in 2016. Partly as a replacement for this facility, the state currently operates the 25 bed Vermont Psychiatric Care Hospital in Berlin, Vermont.

== History ==
During the tenure of Dr. Eugene A. Stanley as superintendent (1918–1936), the hospital expanded – with a patient population peaking at 1,728 in the mid-1930s – and constructed a new three-story building specifically for the treatment of women. Stanley, who was an advocate of eugenics, espoused forced sterilization and advised the Eugenics Society, to whom he provided patient records.

The word, "Waterbury," used in a derogatory sense, was intended to convey to the listener that someone was either insane or was acting or talking in a manner disagreeable to the speaker (e.g. "Keep that up, and we'll be sending you to Waterbury.")

The property was flooded in 1927. In 2011, Tropical Storm Irene flooded the property 2.5 feet (0.76 m) above predicted 100-year level.

In 1963, the population started to decline. Empty floor space was converted into state offices.

In 2011, the hospital closed due to flooding in the aftermath of Tropical Storm Irene in Vermont.

== Facilities ==
In 2012, the property covered 117 acres (47 ha).

== See also ==
- Brandon Training School
- Brattleboro Retreat
- National Register of Historic Places listings in Washington County, Vermont
