= Evanswood, Wisconsin =

- Unincorporated community
- Location within Wisconsin Location within the United States
- Coordinates: 44°17′23″N 88°55′53″W
- Country: United States
- State: Wisconsin
- County: Waupaca
- Elevation: 781 ft (238 m)
- Time zone: UTC-6 (Central (CST))
  - Summer (DST): UTC-5 (CDT)
- Area code: 920
- GNIS feature ID: 1850444

Evanswood is an unincorporated community in the town of Weyauwega, Waupaca County, Wisconsin, United States. The community was named for an early settler named Evan Townsend, who became the first postmaster when the post office was established in September 1854.
