= Albert V. Balch =

American politician

Albert V. Balch (July 21, 1828 – March 3, 1915) was an American surveyor, businessman, and politician.

Born in Plattsburgh, New York, Balch settled in Weyauwega, Wisconsin in 1851. Balch was a surveyor and was in the fire insurance business. Balch served on the Waupaca County, Wisconsin Board of Supervisors, jury commissioner, and was the county surveyor. He also served as postmaster of Weyauwega and was a Republican. In 1870, Balch served in the Wisconsin State Assembly. Balch died in Gulfport, Florida and his funeral was in Weyauwega, Wisconsin.
