= Olin B. Lewis =

American lawyer (1861–1936)

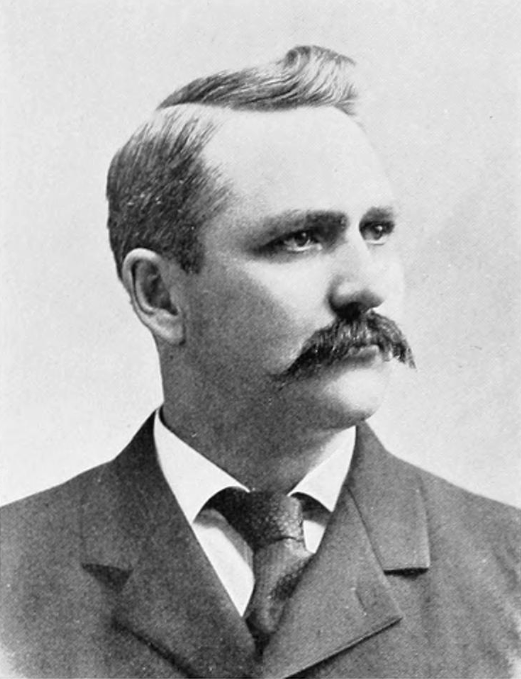
- Born: Olin Bailey Lewis; March 12, 1861; Weyauwega, Wisconsin
- Died: March 28, 1936 (aged 75); Saint Paul, Minnesota
- Education: University of Wisconsin Law School
- Occupations: Politician, educator
- Spouse: Della Barnett (m. 1885)
- Children: 3

Olin Bailey Lewis (March 12, 1861 – March 28, 1936) was an American politician and educator.

== Biography ==
Lewis was born on March 12, 1861, in Weyauwega, Wisconsin. In 1879, he graduated from Omro High School in Omro, Wisconsin. He graduated from the University of Wisconsin–Madison in 1884 and the University of Wisconsin Law School in 1889. In 1885, he married Della Barnett. They had three children. Lewis was a member of the Methodist Episcopal Church.

He died in Saint Paul on March 28, 1936.

== Academic career ==
From 1884 to 1885, Lewis was a chemistry instructor at the University of Wisconsin–Madison. He went on to teach at various schools.

== Political career ==
Lewis was a member of the Saint Paul Municipal Assembly from 1894 to 1898. Additionally, he was a Minnesota District Court judge. He was a Republican.
