= Wayside Restaurant =

American homestyle restaurant in Vermont

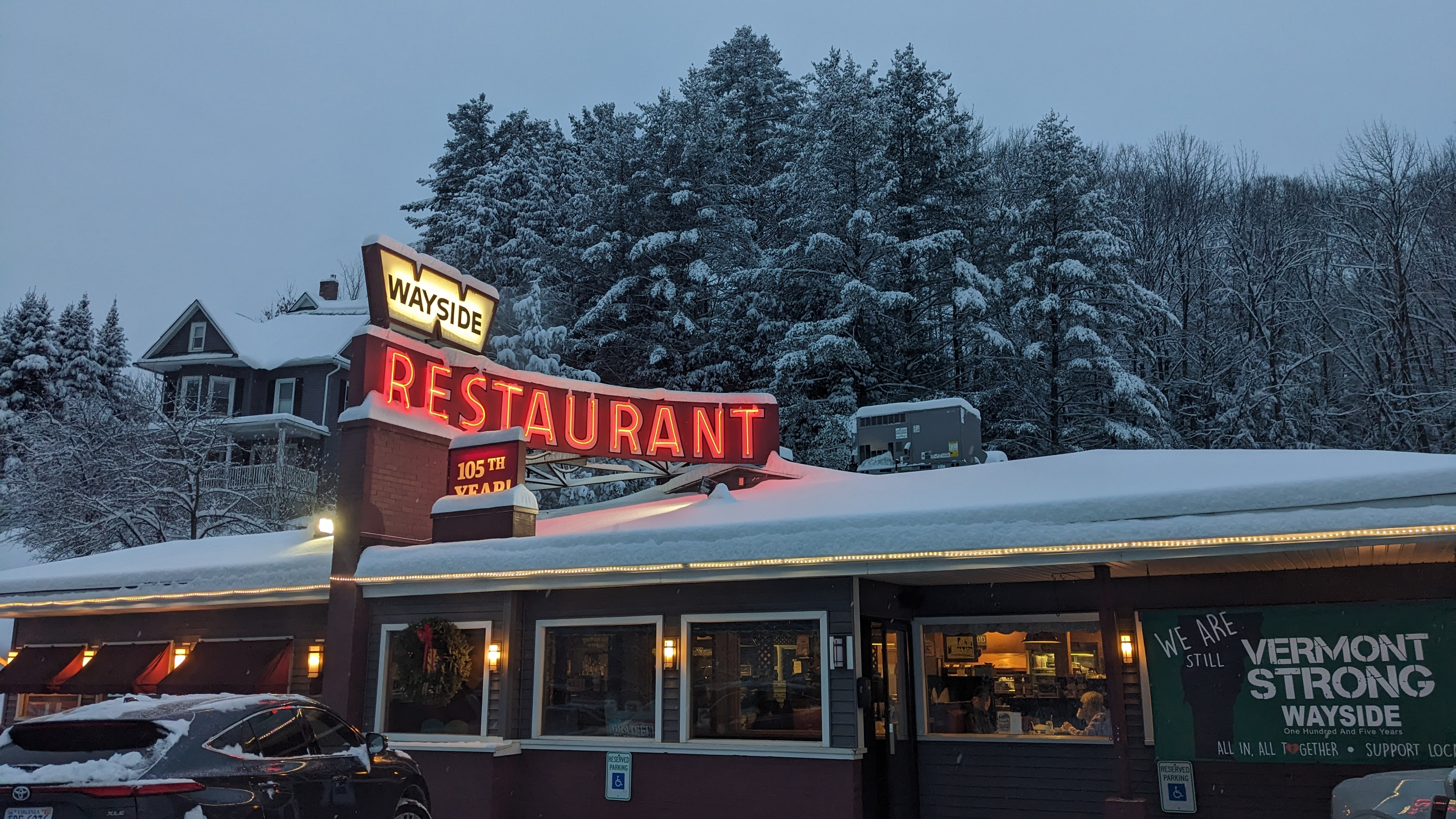
- Interactive map of Wayside Restaurant

Restaurant information
- Established: 1918; 108 years ago
- Manager(s): Brian and Karen Zechinelli
- Location: Berlin, Vermont, United States
- Coordinates: 44.2351°N 72.5544°W

The Wayside Restaurant is an American restaurant in Berlin, Vermont.

== History ==
The Wayside was founded in 1918 by Effie Ballou who lived behind it. She produced pies and other baked goods at home and walked them down the hill to the roadside diner which was a simple building alongside U.S. Route 302. The house behind the restaurant has housed every owner of the Wayside since then. The parking lot of the restaurant is in Montpelier but the building itself is in Berlin.

The Fish family operated the restaurant between 1945 and 1966. The business was purchased by the Galfetti family in 1966. They expanded the footprint of the restaurant seven times. Brian Zechinelli and Karen (Galfetti) Zechinelli have run the restaurant since 1998. The restaurant has expanded to have 160-seats including twenty at the counter. It is a family restaurant open seven days a week. In 2018 it served approximately 1000 diners per day.

== Honors and awards ==
The Galfetti and Zecchinelli families received the Vermont Legacy Achievement Award from the University of Vermont in 2015. It is the first Vermont-certified "Green Restaurant". The Food Network named their maple cream pie the official iconic Pie for Vermont. Eric Asimov from The New York Times has called the food at the Wayside "the true taste of Vermont."
