= Weyauwega (town), Wisconsin =

Weyauwega, Wisconsin
- Town
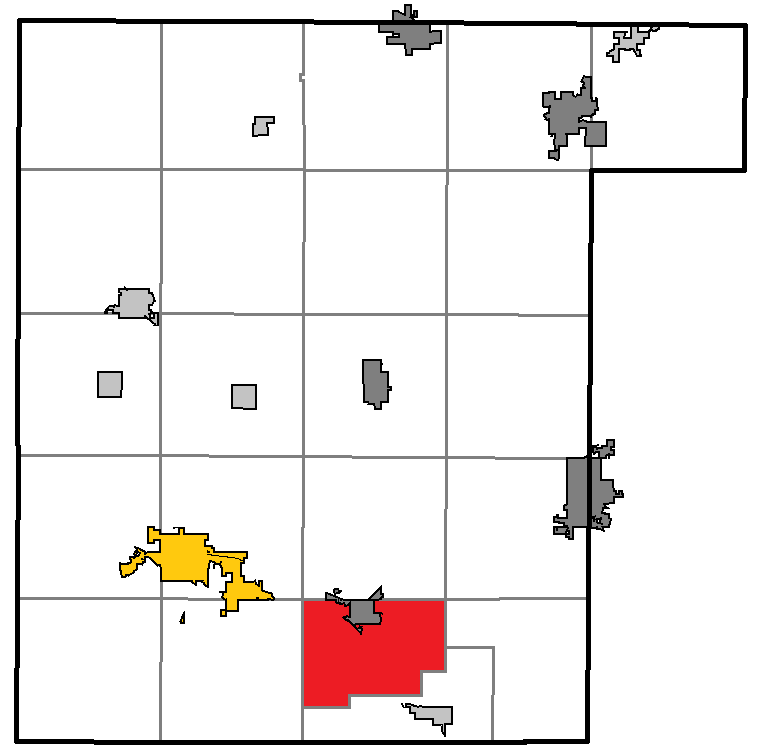
- Location of Weyauwega (town), within Waupaca County
- Coordinates: 44°18′38″N 88°55′36″W
- Country: United States
- State: Wisconsin
- County: Waupaca

Area
  - Total: 21.8 sq mi (56.4 km^{2})
  - Land: 19.9 sq mi (51.5 km^{2})
  - Water: 1.9 sq mi (4.9 km^{2})
- Elevation: 771 ft (235 m)

Population (2020)
  - Total: 567
  - Density: 28.5/sq mi (11.0/km^{2})
- Time zone: UTC-6 (Central (CST))
  - Summer (DST): UTC-5 (CDT)
- Area code: 920
- FIPS code: 55-86425
- GNIS feature ID: 1584419
- Website: https://townofweyauwega-wi.gov/

Weyauwega is a town in Waupaca County, Wisconsin, United States. The population was 567 at the 2020 census. The City of Weyauwega is located mostly within the town, though it is politically independent. The unincorporated communities of Evanswood and Gills Landing are also located in the town.

== Geography ==
According to the United States Census Bureau, the town has a total area of 21.8 square miles (56.4 km^{2}), of which 19.9 square miles (51.5 km^{2}) is land and 1.9 square miles (4.9 km^{2}) (8.72%) is water.

== Demographics ==
As of the census of 2000, there were 627 people, 226 households, and 185 families residing in the town. The population density was 31.5 people per square mile (12.2/km^{2}). There were 262 housing units at an average density of 13.2 per square mile (5.1/km^{2}). The racial makeup of the town was 97.61% White, 0.16% Black or African American, 0.80% Native American, 0.16% Pacific Islander, and 1.28% from two or more races. 0.80% of the population were Hispanic or Latino of any race.

There were 226 households, out of which 41.6% had children under the age of 18 living with them, 65.9% were married couples living together, 11.1% had a female householder with no husband present, and 18.1% were non-families. 15.9% of all households were made up of individuals, and 6.6% had someone living alone who was 65 years of age or older. The average household size was 2.77 and the average family size was 3.09.

In the town, the population was spread out, with 29.2% under the age of 18, 6.2% from 18 to 24, 28.1% from 25 to 44, 24.6% from 45 to 64, and 12.0% who were 65 years of age or older. The median age was 38 years. For every 100 females, there were 102.9 males. For every 100 females age 18 and over, there were 100.0 males.

The median income for a household in the town was $46,442, and the median income for a family was $48,875. Males had a median income of $36,250 versus $23,333 for females. The per capita income for the town was $17,844. About 3.8% of families and 4.5% of the population were below the poverty line, including 3.1% of those under age 18 and 9.8% of those age 65 or over.

== Notable people ==
- Robert Bloch, writer
- Louis Bostedo, politician
- Eliada W. Brown, politician
- Olin B. Lewis, politician
- Lorenzo L. Post, politician

== See also ==
- Weyauwega derailment (railroad accident) of March 4, 1996
