= Vermont Psychiatric Care Hospital =

Hospital in Vermont, US

Geography
- Location: Berlin, Vermont, United States
- Coordinates: 44.22305°N 72.5650°W

Organization
- Type: Specialist

Services
- Beds: 25
- Speciality: Psychiatry

History
- Opened: 2014

Links
- Website: mentalhealth.vermont.gov/services/psychiatric-hospitalization/vermont-psychiatric-care-hospital
- Lists: Hospitals in Vermont

The Vermont Psychiatric Care Hospital is the State of Vermont's primary hospital for involuntary mental health patients. It is located in the town of Berlin, Vermont, in Washington County. With 25 beds, it was opened in 2014 as a replacement for the Vermont State Hospital, which had been closed due to flooding from Tropical Storm Irene.

The hospital was designed and constructed by local firms at a cost of $23 million.
