= Joseph Miller (Wisconsin politician) =

American politician

Joseph A. Miller (1847–1928) was a member of the Wisconsin State Assembly during the 1883 and 1885 sessions. Other positions he held include member of the county board of Manitowoc County, Wisconsin, from 1876 to 1879. He was a Democrat.

Miller was born on March 6, 1847, in Christofsgrund, Bohemia, then in the Austrian Empire. His family emigrated to Oconto, Wisconsin, when he was 9 years old. He moved to Maple Grove, Wisconsin, and married Ottilia Bauer (1847–1902), with whom he raised four children. Miller died on August 14, 1928, in Brillion, Wisconsin.
