= Weyauwega, Wisconsin =

- City
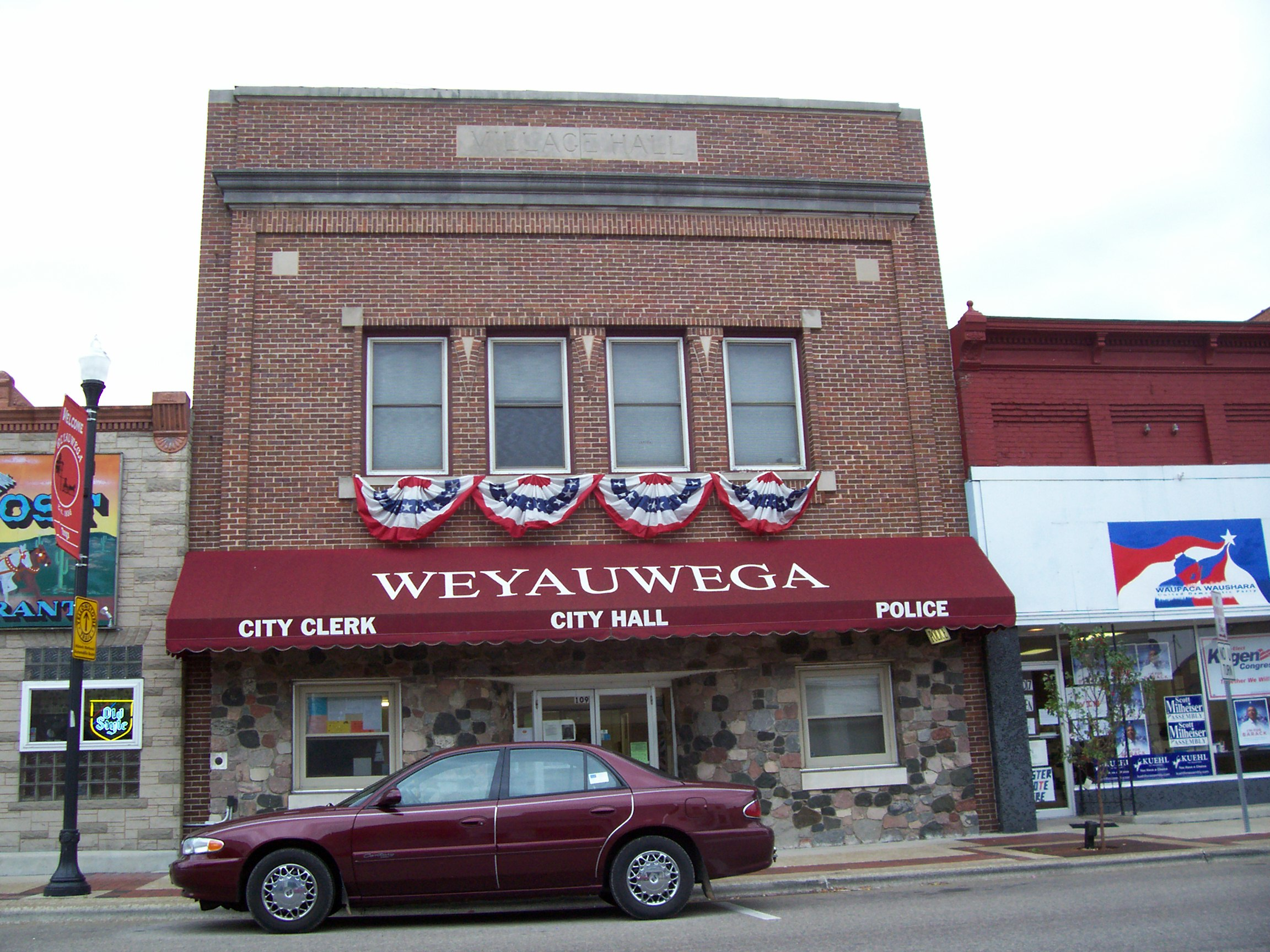
- City hall in downtown Weyauwega

- Location of Weyauwega in Waupaca County, Wisconsin.

- Location within Wisconsin Location within the United States
- Coordinates: 44°19′N 88°56′W
- Country: United States
- State: Wisconsin
- County: Waupaca
- Incorporated (city): April 15, 1939

Area
  - Total: 1.66 sq mi (4.30 km^{2})
  - Land: 1.54 sq mi (3.98 km^{2})
  - Water: 0.12 sq mi (0.32 km^{2})

Population (2020)
  - Total: 1,796
  - Density: 1,170/sq mi (451/km^{2})
- Time zone: UTC-6 (Central (CST))
  - Summer (DST): UTC-5 (CDT)
- ZIP codes: 54983
- Area code: 920
- FIPS code: 55-86400
- Website: www.cityofweyauwega-wi.gov

Weyauwega (/waɪ.əˈwiːɡə/ wy-ə-WEE-gə, colloquially "Wega") is a city in Waupaca County, Wisconsin, United States. The population was 1,796 at the 2020 census.

The city is located mostly within the Town of Weyauwega, though it is politically independent of the town. Small portions extend north into the adjacent Town of Royalton. The name "Weyauwega" is described by the Weyauwega Chamber of Commerce as potentially meaning "here we rest" in an indigenous language because the town's origin was a resting point between two rivers when Native Americans had to portage their canoes. Given the local indigenous culture is described as Menominee, the language may be the Menominee language. European colonist activity in the area began with a small building set up by fur traders, from which the town later grew.

== History ==
Weyauwega has been host to the annual event Horse and Buggy Days since 1961. The event celebrates the past significance of the horse and buggy in the community. The event is presented by the Weyauwega Chamber of Commerce and features a parade, music and other activities.

The Waupaca County Fair has been held in Weyauwega since 1874 at the Waupaca County Fairgrounds at the east end of the City of Weyauwega.

In 1996, an 81-car freight train derailed, causing a large fire and several explosions from the hazardous materials in the train cars, prompting an evacuation of the town for two weeks until the fires burned out.

== Geography ==
Weyauwega is located at 44°19′N 88°56′W (44.322, -88.933).

According to the United States Census Bureau, the city has a total area of 1.71 square miles (4.43 km^{2}), of which 1.58 square miles (4.09 km^{2}) is land and 0.13 square miles (0.34 km^{2}) is water.

== Demographics ==
Historical population
Census	Pop.	Note	%±
1880	722		—
1890	706		−2.2%
1900	911		29.0%
1910	967		6.1%
1920	938		−3.0%
1930	1,067		13.8%
1940	1,173		9.9%
1950	1,207		2.9%
1960	1,239		2.7%
1970	1,377		11.1%
1980	1,549		12.5%
1990	1,665		7.5%
2000	1,806		8.5%
2010	1,900		5.2%
2020	1,796		−5.5%
U.S. Decennial Census

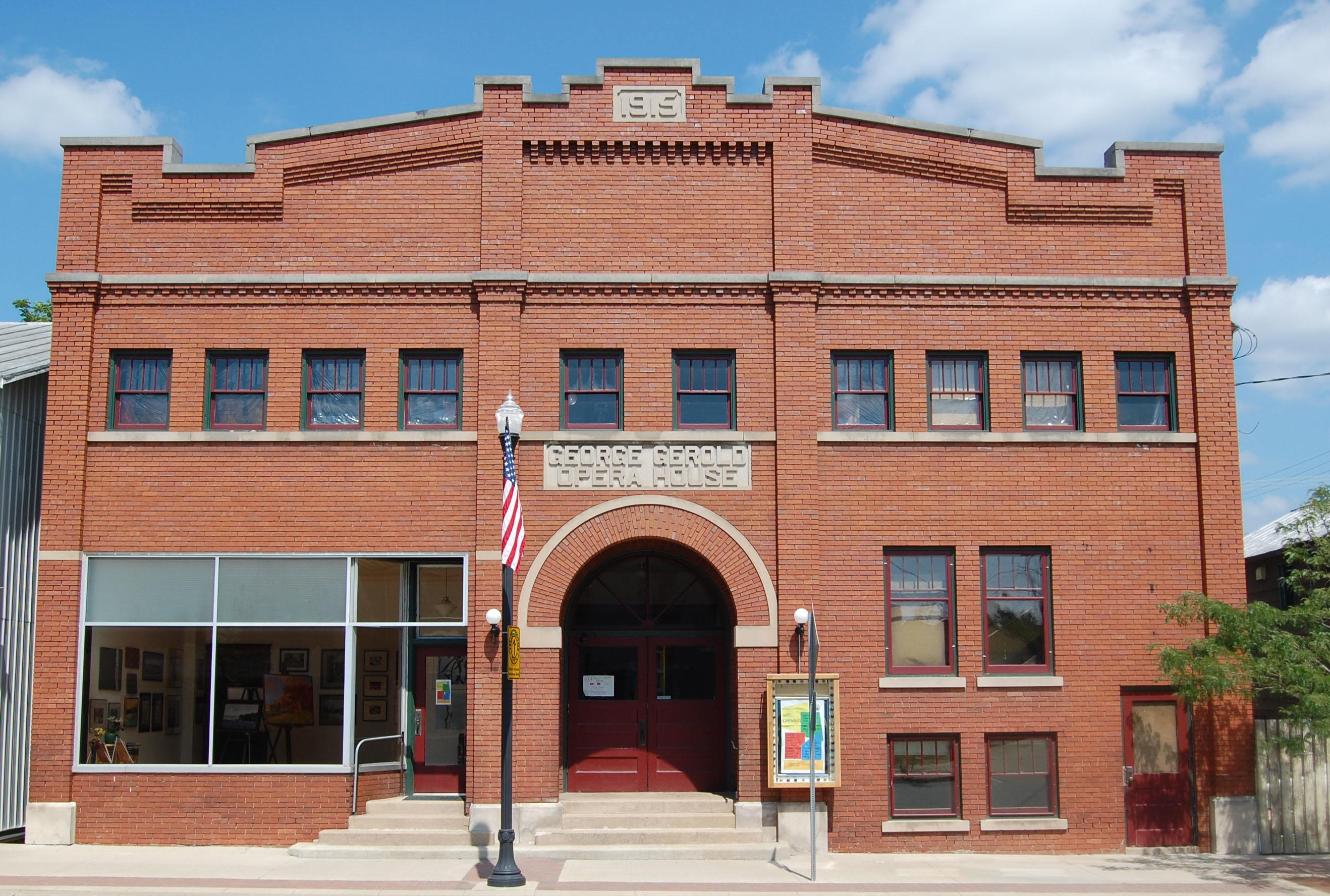
George Gerold Opera House, Home of Wega Arts

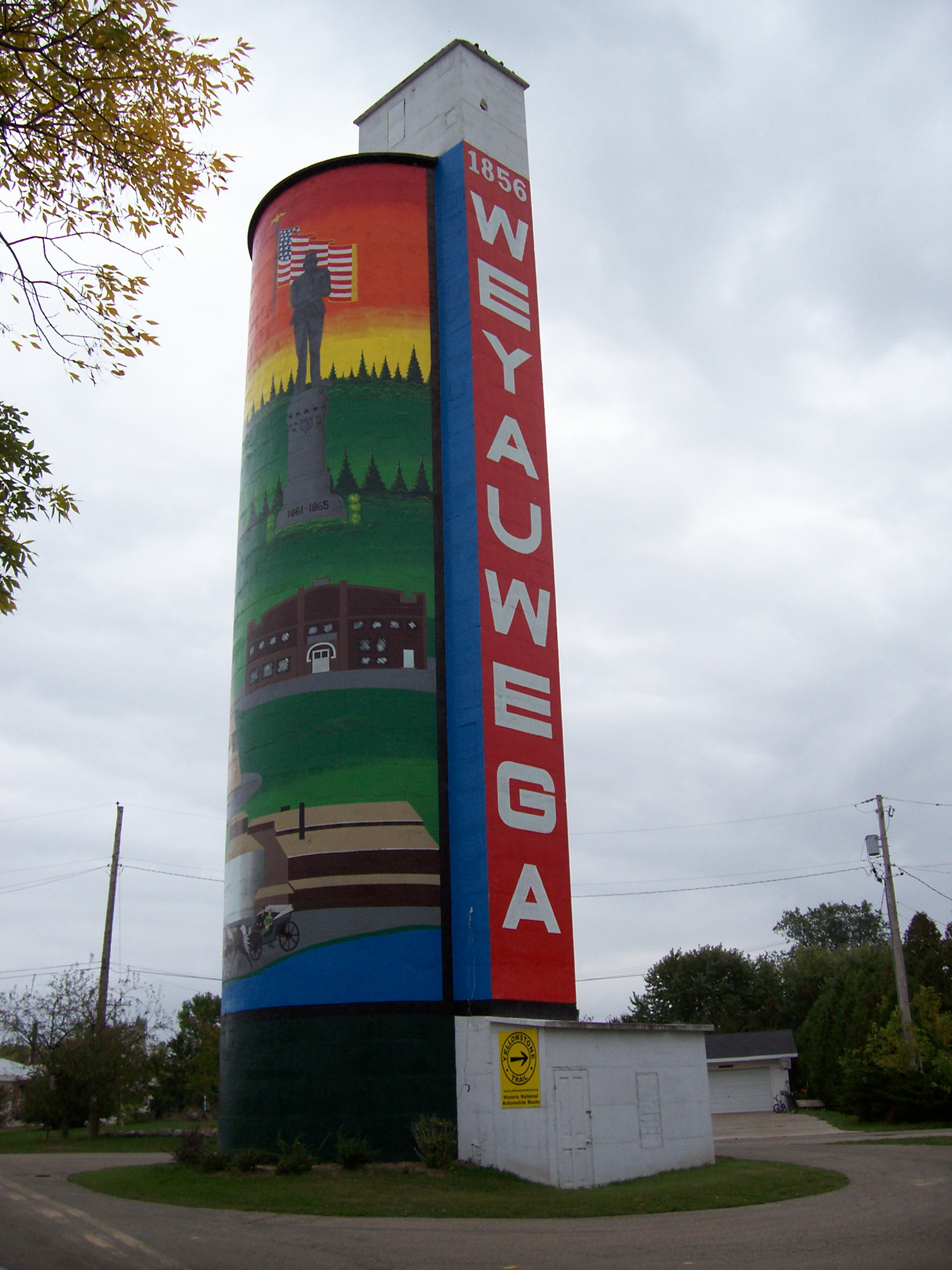
Tower at park

=== 2010 census ===
As of the census of 2010, there were 1,900 people, 746 households, and 473 families living in the city. The population density was 1,202.5 inhabitants per square mile (464.3/km^{2}). There were 815 housing units at an average density of 515.8 per square mile (199.2/km^{2}). The racial makeup of the city was 96.4% White, 0.3% African American, 0.2% Native American, 0.2% Asian, 0.1% Pacific Islander, 1.6% from other races, and 1.3% from two or more races. Hispanic or Latino of any race were 6.1% of the population.

There were 746 households, of which 33.1% had children under the age of 18 living with them, 43.4% were married couples living together, 12.5% had a female householder with no husband present, 7.5% had a male householder with no wife present, and 36.6% were non-families. 29.8% of all households were made up of individuals, and 11.7% had someone living alone who was 65 years of age or older. The average household size was 2.43 and the average family size was 2.98.

The median age in the city was 38.2 years. 25.3% of residents were under the age of 18; 8.9% were between the ages of 18 and 24; 24.9% were from 25 to 44; 23.7% were from 45 to 64; and 17.3% were 65 years of age or older. The sex demographics of the city were 49.7% male and 50.3% female.

=== 2000 census ===
As of the census of 2000, there were 1,806 people, 720 households, and 460 families living in the city. The population density was 1,201.7 people per square mile (464.9/km^{2}). There were 763 housing units at an average density of 507.7 per square mile (196.4/km^{2}). The racial makeup of the city was 97.84% White, 0.39% Black or African American, 0.22% Native American, 0.17% Asian, 0.28% from other races, and 1.11% from two or more races. 0.94% of the population were Hispanic or Latino of any race.

There were 720 households, out of which 31.4% had children under the age of 18 living with them, 50.4% were married couples living together, 9.7% had a female householder with no husband present, and 36.0% were non-families. 29.6% of all households were made up of individuals, and 13.6% had someone living alone who was 65 years of age or older. The average household size was 2.39 and the average family size was 2.98.

In the city, the population was spread out, with 25.3% under the age of 18, 7.6% from 18 to 24, 29.0% from 25 to 44, 18.9% from 45 to 64, and 19.2% who were 65 years of age or older. The median age was 37 years. For every 100 females, there were 92.9 males. For every 100 females age 18 and over, there were 87.6 males.

The median income for a household in the city was $34,556, and the median income for a family was $42,067. Males had a median income of $32,073 versus $22,609 for females. The per capita income for the city was $16,755. About 3.8% of families and 6.5% of the population were below the poverty line, including 2.7% of those under age 18 and 11.5% of those age 65 or over.

== Education ==
Weyauwega is served by the Weyauwega-Fremont School District, which has an enrollment of about 963 students. The district has a high school, a middle school, and two elementary schools, one in Weyauwega and another in nearby Fremont, Wisconsin.

St. Peter Lutheran School is a 3K-8 grade school of the Wisconsin Evangelical Lutheran Synod in Weyauwega.

== Transportation ==
Weyauwega is located on Wisconsin Highway 110. U.S. Route 10 and Wisconsin Highway 49 are located just south and west of the city. The Yellowstone Trail ran through the city, and its former route is denoted by signs through the downtown and northern portions of the city.

== Notable people ==
- Albert V. Balch, Wisconsin State Representative
- Lyman E. Barnes, U.S. Representative from Wisconsin
- Benjamin P. Birdsall, U.S. Representative from Iowa
- Robert Bloch, Author of the 1959 novel Psycho
- Mark Block, Chief of Staff for the Herman Cain 2012 presidential campaign
- Eliada W. Brown, member of the Wisconsin State Assembly
- George de Rue Meiklejohn, U.S. Representative from Nebraska
- Sona (Hunter) Mehring, Founder of CaringBridge
- George S. Merry, South Dakota State Representative
- William E. Merry, South Dakota state legislator
- Hallie H. Rowe, member of the Wisconsin State Assembly

== See also ==
- Weyauwega derailment (railroad accident) of March 4, 1996
