= Seymour, Lafayette County, Wisconsin =

Seymour, Wisconsin
- Town
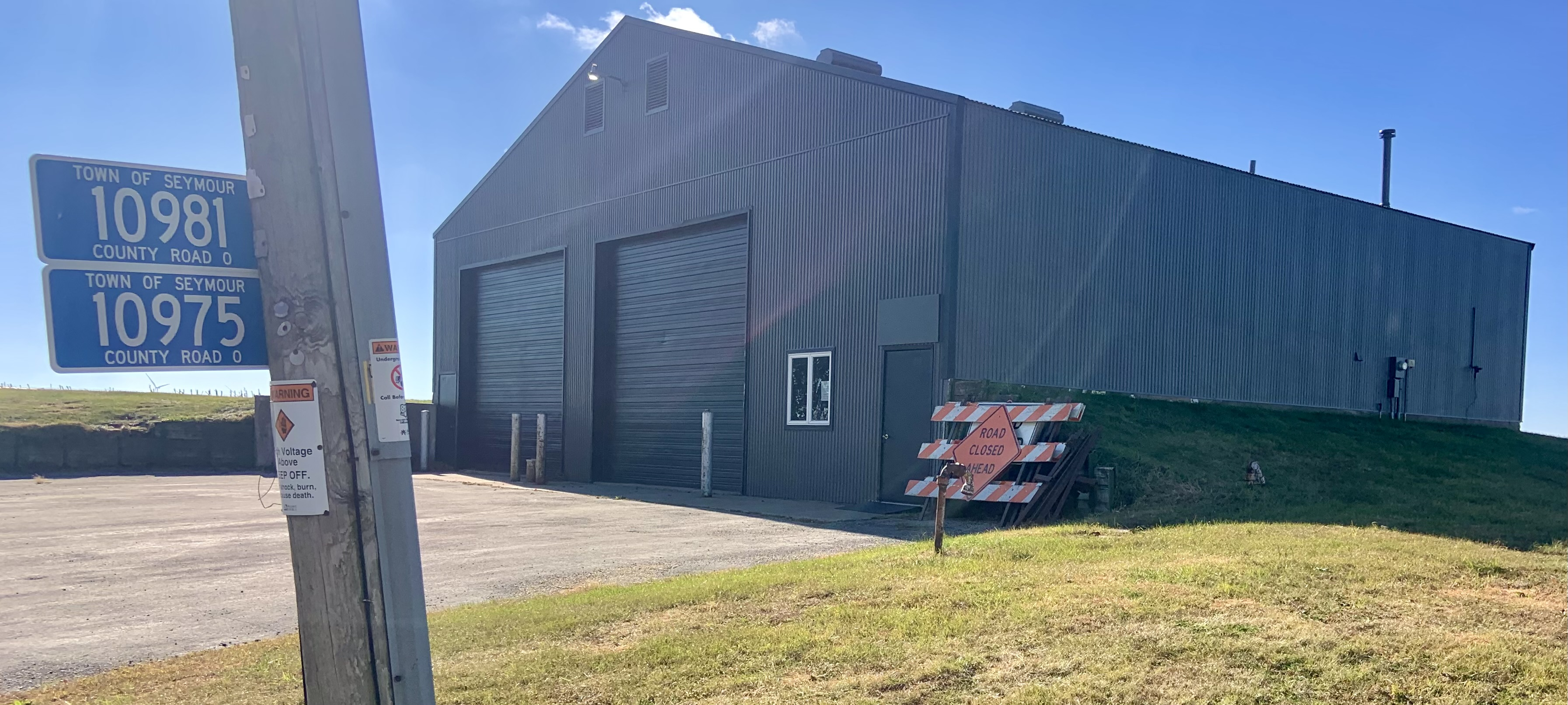
- Town hall

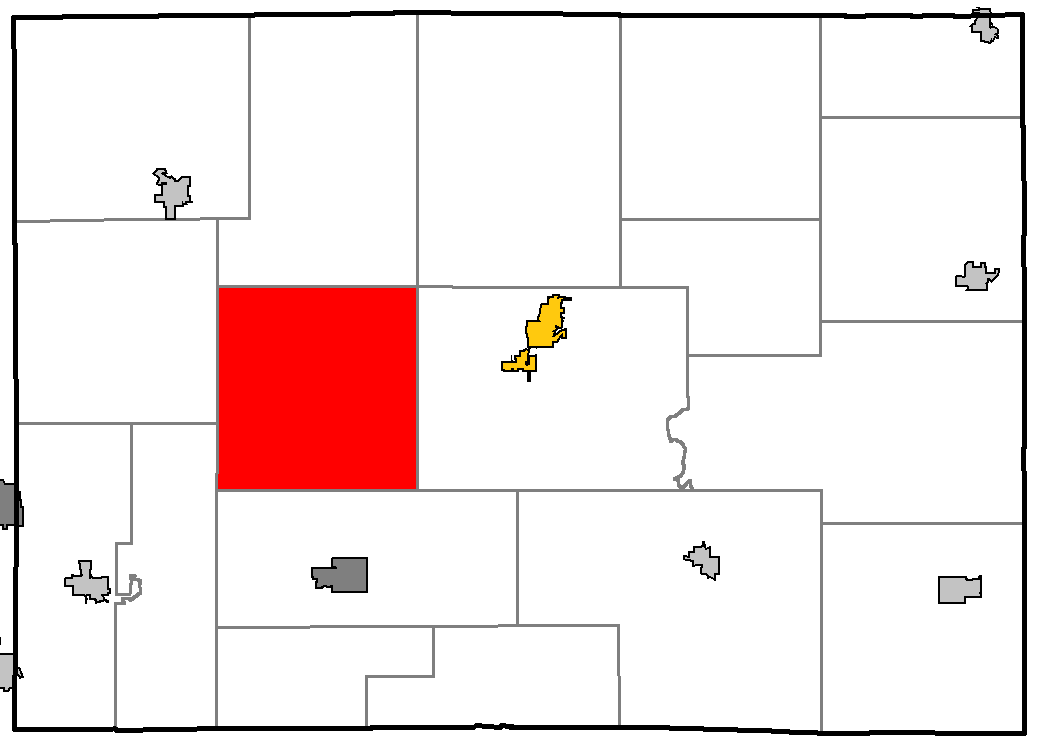
- Location of Seymour, within Lafayette County, Wisconsin

- Location of Lafayette County, Wisconsin
- Coordinates: 42°39′7″N 90°14′58″W
- Country: United States
- State: Wisconsin
- County: Lafayette

Area
  - Total: 36.12 sq mi (93.56 km^{2})
  - Land: 36.12 sq mi (93.56 km^{2})
  - Water: 0 sq mi (0.0 km^{2})
- Elevation: 1,043 ft (318 m)

Population (2020)
  - Total: 392
  - Density: 12/sq mi (4.8/km^{2})
- Time zone: UTC-6 (Central (CST))
  - Summer (DST): UTC-5 (CDT)
- ZIP Codes: 53510 (Belmont); 53530 (Darlington); 53586 (Shullsburg)
- Area code: 608
- FIPS code: 55-72700
- GNIS feature ID: 1584128

Seymour is a town in Lafayette County, Wisconsin, United States. The population was 392 at the 2020 census, up from 446 at the 2010 census. The unincorporated community of Seymour Corners is located in the town.

== Geography ==
Seymour is in west-central Lafayette County, just west of Darlington, the county seat. According to the United States Census Bureau, the town of Seymour has a total area of 36.1 square miles (93.6 km^{2}), all land.

== Demographics ==
Historical population
Census	Pop.	Note	%±
2000	363		—
2010	446		22.9%
2020	392		−12.1%

As of the census of 2000, there were 363 people, 118 households, and 96 families residing in the town. The population density was 10.0 people per square mile (3.9/km^{2}). There were 122 housing units at an average density of 3.4 per square mile (1.3/km^{2}). The racial makeup of the town was 99.72% White and 0.28% Native American.

There were 118 households, out of which 46.6% had children under the age of 18 living with them, 72.0% were married couples living together, 2.5% had a female householder with no husband present, and 17.8% were non-families. 16.1% of all households were made up of individuals, and 5.1% had someone living alone who was 65 years of age or older. The average household size was 3.08 and the average family size was 3.45.

In the town, the population was spread out, with 36.9% under the age of 18, 5.5% from 18 to 24, 30.0% from 25 to 44, 18.7% from 45 to 64, and 8.8% who were 65 years of age or older. The median age was 32 years. For every 100 females, there were 111.0 males. For every 100 females age 18 and over, there were 120.2 males.

The median income for a household in the town was $40,000, and the median income for a family was $40,536. Males had a median income of $25,417 versus $22,917 for females. The per capita income for the town was $13,390. About 10.9% of families and 14.1% of the population were below the poverty line, including 20.3% of those under age 18 and 6.5% of those age 65 or over.
