= Royalton (community), Wisconsin =

Royalton, Wisconsin
- Unincorporated community
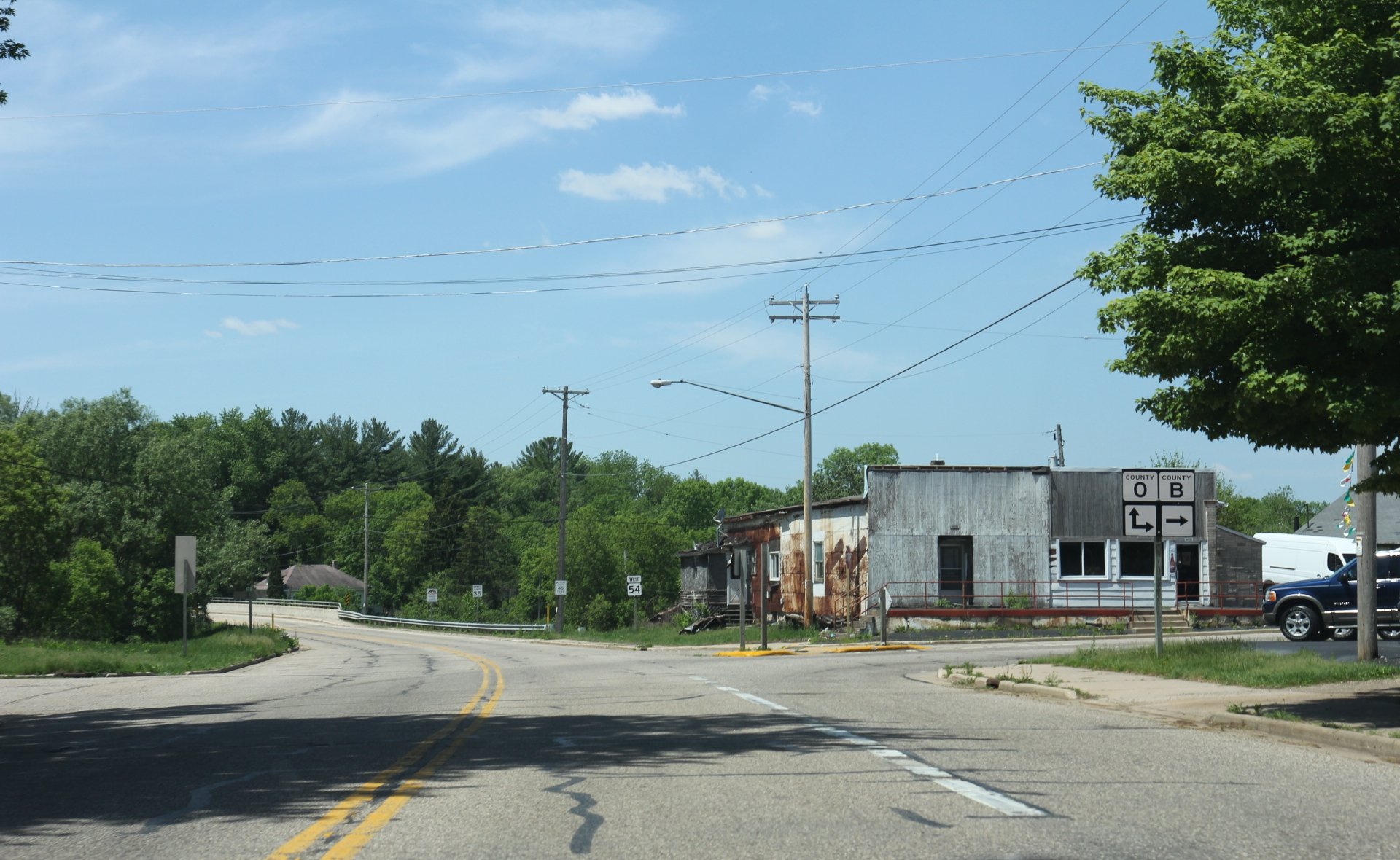
- Downtown Royalton

- Location within Wisconsin Location within the United States
- Coordinates: 44°24′46″N 88°51′46″W
- Country: United States
- State: Wisconsin
- County: Waupaca
- Elevation: 810 ft (250 m)
- Time zone: UTC-6 (Central (CST))
  - Summer (DST): UTC-5 (CDT)
- Area code: 920
- GNIS feature ID: 1572697

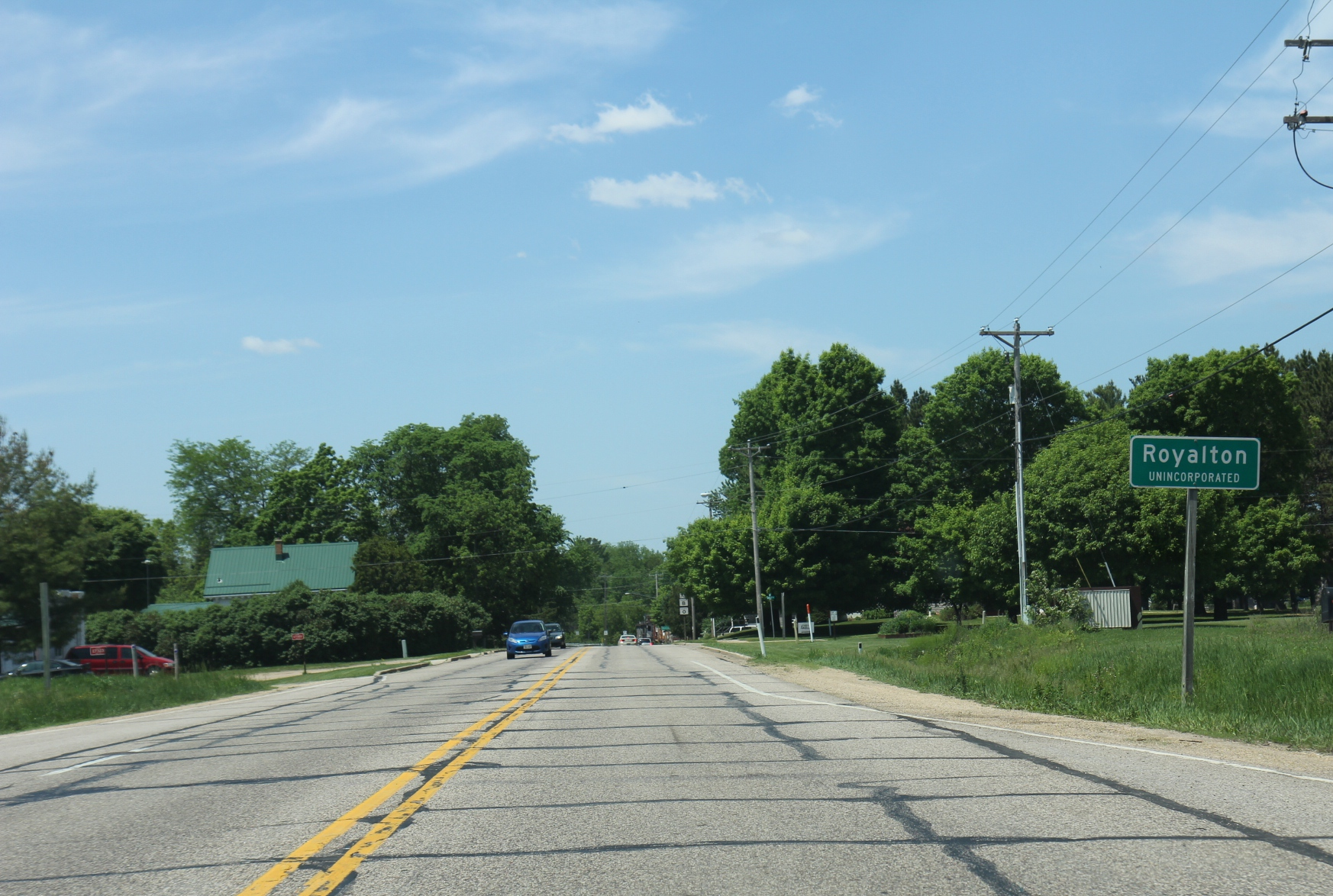
Sign for Royalton

Royalton is an unincorporated community located in the town of Royalton, Waupaca County, Wisconsin, United States. Royalton is located on Wisconsin Highway 54, 6.5 miles (10.5 km) west-northwest of New London.
