= Royalton Township =

Royalton Township may refer to:

- Royalton Township, Michigan
- Royalton Township, Pine County, Minnesota
- Royalton Township, Fulton County, Ohio
- Royalton Township, Cuyahoga County, Ohio
