= William E. Merry =

American politician

Member of the South Dakota Senate from the 10th district
- In office 1927–1928

Personal details
- Born: March 6, 1861 Royalton, Wisconsin
- Died: February 4, 1941 Dell Rapids, South Dakota
- Party: Republican
- Spouse: Reefa Mable Hart

William E. Merry (March 6, 1861 – February 4, 1941) was a member of the South Dakota House of Representatives.

== Biography ==
Merry was born William Edgar Merry on March 6, 1861 in Royalton, Wisconsin. He moved to Dell Rapids, South Dakota in 1873.

On November 27, 1888, Merry married Reefa Hart. They would have four children before she died on January 27, 1924. He later married Lulu Blackman on June 2, 1926. Merry died on February 4, 1941. He was a Baptist.

His brother, George, was also a member of the South Dakota House of Representatives.

== Career ==
Merry was a member of the House of Representatives from 1927 to 1928. He was a Republican.
