= Eliada W. Brown =

American farmer and politician

Member of the Wisconsin State Assembly from the Waupaca County 1st District
- In office 1883–1885
- Preceded by: Josephus Wakefield
- Succeeded by: Andrew G. Nelson

Postmaster of Weyauwega, Wisconsin
- In office September 9, 1897 – May 4, 1902
- Preceded by: Wilder W. Crane
- Succeeded by: James F. Corbett

Personal details
- Born: January 8, 1840 Berlin, Vermont
- Died: May 4, 1902 (aged 62) Weyauwega, Wisconsin
- Resting place: Oakwood Cemetery, Weyauwega, Wisconsin
- Party: Republican
- Spouse: Laura Ripley Stevens (m. 1862–1902, his death)
- Children: 1
- Occupation: Farmer

Eliada W. Brown (January 8, 1840 – May 4, 1902) was a Wisconsin farmer and politician. A Republican, he was a member of the Wisconsin State Assembly from 1883 to 1885.

== Biography ==
Eliada White Brown was born in Berlin, Vermont on January 8, 1840. He was educated in the local schools and became a farmer. In 1872, he relocated to Weyauwega, Wisconsin. A Republican, he was chairman of his town board for four years and also served as a county supervisor. Brown represented the first district of Waupaca County in the Wisconsin State Assembly from 1883 to 1885.

In 1897, Brown was appointed as Weyauwega's postmaster, and he remained in this position until his death. Brown was also active in several business ventures, and at the time of his death was vice president and a director of the Weyauwega Trunk and Bag Company. He died in Weyauwega on May 4, 1902, and was buried at Oakwood Cemetery in Weyauwega.
