= Royalton, Wisconsin =

- Town
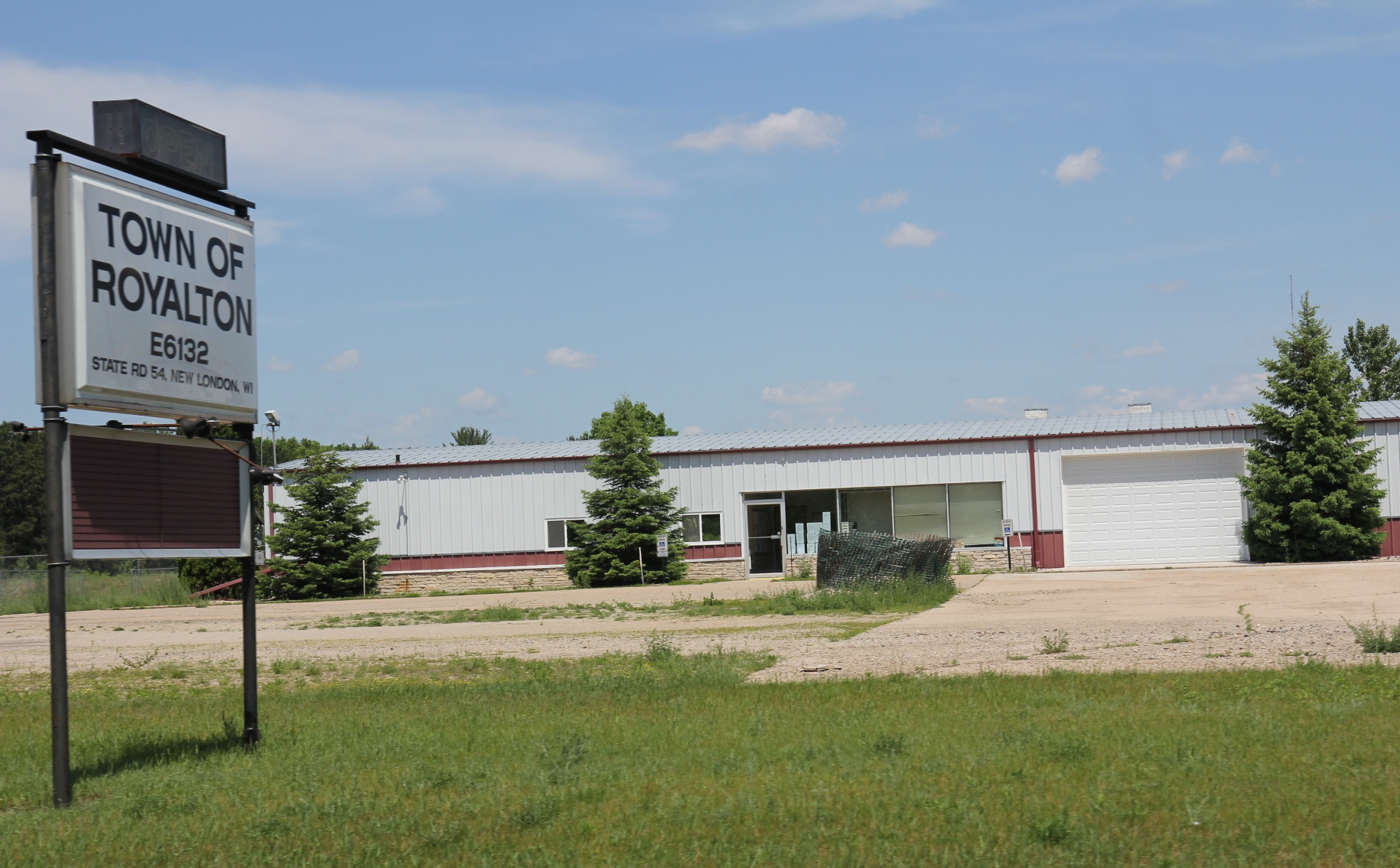
- town hall

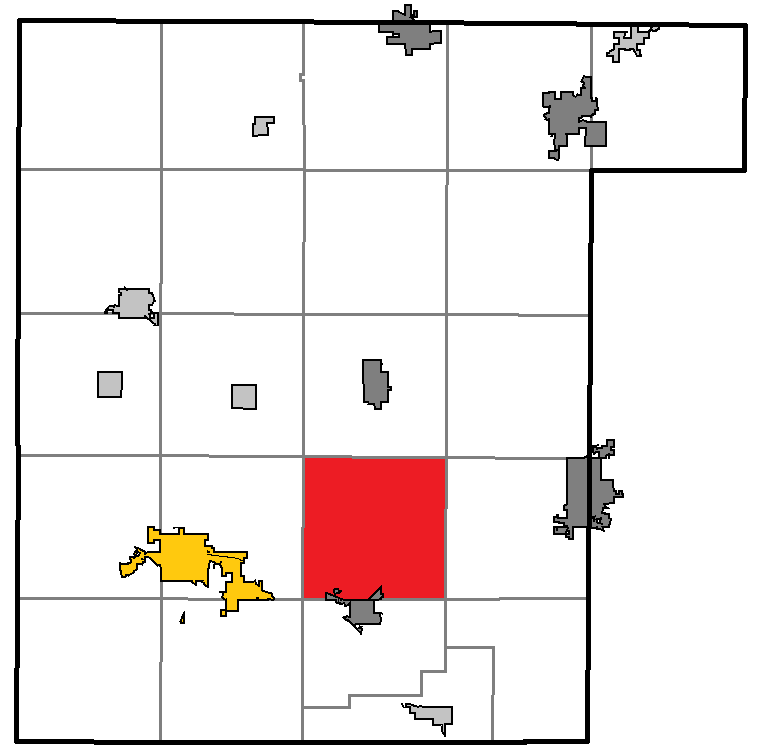
- Location of Royalton, within Waupaca County
- Coordinates: 44°22′58″N 88°55′49″W
- Country: United States
- State: Wisconsin
- County: Waupaca

Area
  - Total: 35.9 sq mi (93.0 km^{2})
  - Land: 33.6 sq mi (87.1 km^{2})
  - Water: 2.3 sq mi (5.9 km^{2})
- Elevation: 810 ft (247 m)

Population (2020)
  - Total: 1,359
  - Density: 40.4/sq mi (15.6/km^{2})
- Time zone: UTC-6 (Central (CST))
  - Summer (DST): UTC-5 (CDT)
- FIPS code: 55-69900
- GNIS feature ID: 1584071
- Website: https://townofroyalton.com/

Royalton is a town in Waupaca County, Wisconsin, United States. The population was 1,359 at the 2020 census. The unincorporated communities of Baldwins Mill and Royalton are located in the town.

== Geography ==
According to the United States Census Bureau, the town has a total area of 35.9 square miles (93.0 km^{2}), of which 33.6 square miles (87.1 km^{2}) is land and 2.3 square miles (5.9 km^{2}) (6.38%) is water.

== Demographics ==
As of the census of 2000, there were 1523 people, 524 households, and 406 families residing in the town. The population density was 45.3 people per square mile (17.5/km^{2}). There were 608 housing units at an average density of 18.1 per square mile (7.0/km^{2}). The racial makeup of the town was 98.56% White, 0.07% African American, 0.33% Native American, 0.53% Asian, and 0.53% from two or more races. Hispanic or Latino of any race were 0.07% of the population.

There were 524 households, out of which 35.5% had children under the age of 18 living with them, 67.6% were married couples living together, 5.0% had a female householder with no husband present, and 22.5% were non-families. 17.2% of all households were made up of individuals, and 7.1% had someone living alone who was 65 years of age or older. The average household size was 2.75 and the average family size was 3.09.

In the town, the population was spread out, with 25.5% under the age of 18, 7.0% from 18 to 24, 26.8% from 25 to 44, 25.4% from 45 to 64, and 15.4% who were 65 years of age or older. The median age was 40 years. For every 100 females, there were 103.3 males. For every 100 females age 18 and over, there were 102.0 males.

The median income for a household in the town was $48,804, and the median income for a family was $53,500. Males had a median income of $35,607 versus $24,189 for females. The per capita income for the town was $19,573. About 1.6% of families and 2.9% of the population were below the poverty line, including 2.1% of those under age 18 and 3.4% of those age 65 or over.

== Notable people ==
- William Masters, farmer and politician
- William E. Merry, member of the South Dakota Senate
