= List of Vermont suffragists =

This is a list of Vermont suffragists, suffrage groups and others associated with the cause of women's suffrage in Vermont.

== Groups ==
- American Woman Suffrage Association (AWSA).
- Burlington Equal Franchise League.
- National Woman's Party (NWP).
- New England Woman Suffrage Association (NEWSA).
- Vermont Equal Suffrage Association, reorganized from VWSA in 1907.
- Vermont Woman Suffrage Association (VWSA), formed in 1870.
- Woman's Christian Temperance Union (WCTU).

== Suffragists ==
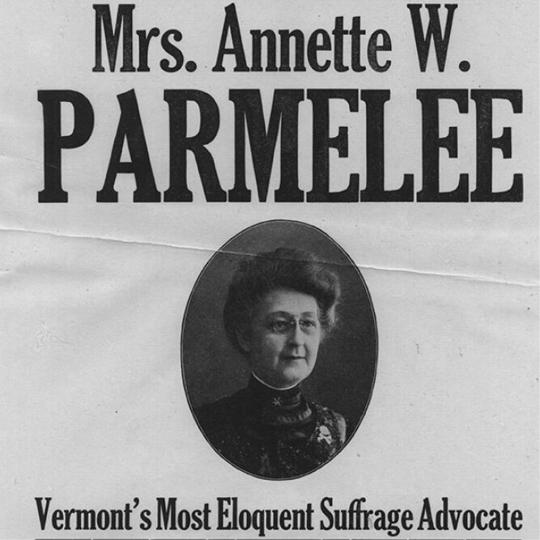
Annette W. Parmelee, "Vermont's Most Eloquent Suffrage Advocate," 1917 poster

- Elizabeth Colley (Waterbury).
- L. J. C. Daniels (Grafton).
- Seneca M. Dorr (Rutland).
- Eliza Eaton.
- Maria L. T. Hidden.
- Laura Kezer (Rochester).
- Laura Moore (Barnet).
- Clarina I. H. Nichols.
- Lillian Olzendam.
- Annette W. Parmelee (Enosburgh).
- Julia Pierce.
- Anna Hawks Putnam (Bennington).
- Grace Willey Sherwood (St. Albans).
- Mary Bennetts Spargo (Bennington).
- Elizabeth Van Patten (Burlington).
- Charles W. Willard.
- Frances Rastall Wyman (Manchester).

=== Politicians supporting women's suffrage in Vermont ===
- Harvey Howes (Fair Haven).
- Hosea Mann.
- Wendell Phillips Stafford.
- Russell S. Taft (Burlington).

== Suffragists campaigning in Vermont ==
- Sara MacCormack Algeo.
- Henry Browne Blackwell.
- Mary Nettie Chase.
- Tracy Cutler.
- Susan Fessenden.
- Antoinette Funk.
- William Lloyd Garrison.
- Julia Ward Howe.
- Mary H. Hunt.
- Abby Hutchinson Patton.
- Mary Livermore.
- Emma Barrett Molloy.
- Frances H. Rastall.
- Nancy Schoonmaker.
- Anna Howard Shaw.
- Lucy Stone.
- Mary Traffarn Whitney.
- Frances Willard.
- Charles Zueblin.

== Publications ==
- Christian Repository (Montpelier).

== Antisuffragists in Vermont ==
- Massachusetts Association Opposed to the Further Extension of Suffrage to Women.
- Mrs. Charles Homans.

== See also ==
- List of American suffragists
- Timeline of women's suffrage in Vermont
- Women's suffrage in Vermont
- Timeline of women's suffrage in the United States
- Women's suffrage in the United States
