= Women's suffrage in Vermont =

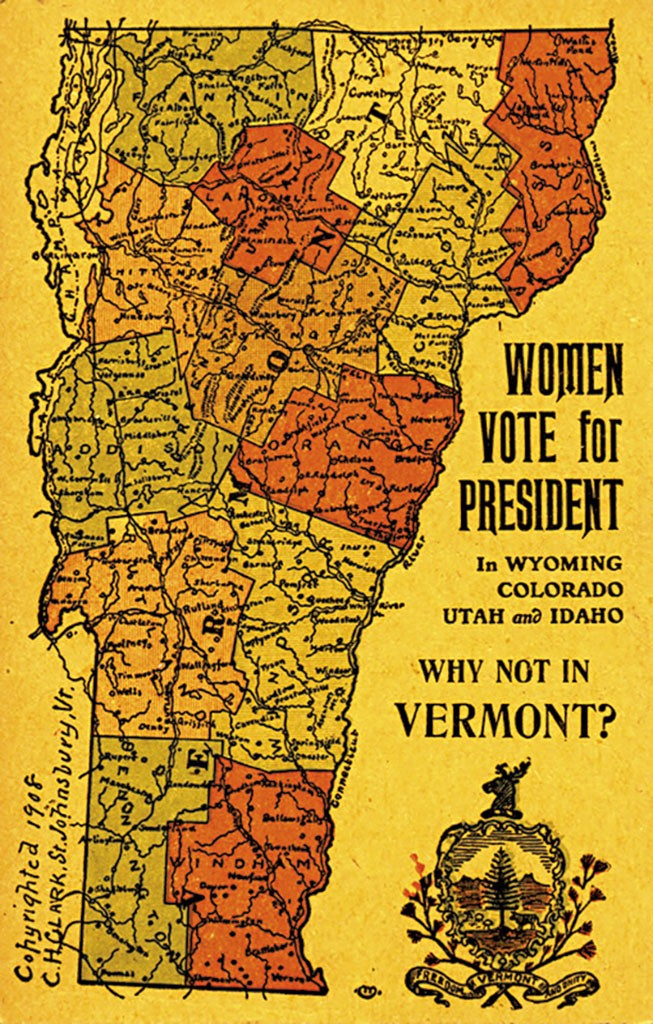
Women Vote for President...Why Not in Vermont? Map on postcard, 1908

Women's suffrage efforts in Vermont began in the 1850s with agitation from early suffragist, Clarina I. H. Nichols. By the 1870s the American Woman Suffrage Association (AWSA) looked to independent-minded Vermonters to support women's suffrage. A state suffrage organization was formed and various efforts to include women as voters were kicked off. The Woman's Christian Temperance Union (WCTU) of Vermont was highly influential in supporting many legislative efforts for women to vote. Eventually, in 1917, Vermont women earned the right to vote in municipal elections, making them the first state in New England to grant women this right. Vermont ratified the Nineteenth Amendment in February of 1921.

== Early efforts ==
The suffrage movement in Vermont was largely led by white, middle-class women and some men. Before Clarina I. H. Nichols moved to Kansas, she was an early advocate for women's rights and women's suffrage in the state of Vermont. Nichols was active in the early 1850s and was an editor of the Windham County Democrat. Her activism changed Vermont's laws affecting women, such as gaining significant reforms in divorce and property laws in women's favor. When Lucy Stone spoke in Randolph in 1854, she urged women to refuse to pay taxes until they were allowed to vote. Stone's fashion sense received as much commentary as her speech did. In June of 1858, a Free Convention of the Republican Party was held in Rutland that drew up a petition for women's suffrage, but it was ignored by the Vermont General Assembly.

The Woman's Journal published an article by Henry Browne Blackwell of the American Woman Suffrage Association (AWSA) in which he expressed his opinion that Vermont was a good place to start working towards women's suffrage. Blackwell believed that the people of the state had "been reared in the tradition of liberty" and would be uniquely receptive to the expansion of voting rights. In the beginning of 1870, several women's rights and suffrage speakers toured Vermont, many of them hired and recruited out of Boston. Delegates from the AWSA arrived in Montpelier in February of that year, where they hosted a state woman's suffrage convention. Early on, there was a good deal of optimism that women's suffrage could be won easily in Vermont. But, at many of these early meetings, speakers faced ridicule and various types of negative disturbances. The press also criticized suffrage speakers, still focusing on their appearance and other trivial details as opposed to engaging with their ideas.

Minutes of the First Annual Meeting of the Vermont Woman's Suffrage Association, Held in the M. E. Church, Barton Landing, Wednesday and Thursday, Jan. 14 and 15, 1885

Also in 1870, women's suffrage activists planned to canvass the state in preparation for the upcoming Constitutional Convention for the Vermont State Constitution. The Vermont Woman Suffrage Association (VWSA) was formed in 1870 by men who were members of the Council of Censors. There were around 100 initial members and the first president was Charles Reed, the State Librarian. It was the position of VWSA that women deserved the same rights as men, but also that they were "the moral superiors of men." The VWSA presented its demands for a women's suffrage amendment to the state constitution in June of that year. Only one legislator, Harvey Howes, supported the woman's suffrage amendment.

In 1876, Frances Willard, head of the National Woman's Christian Temperance Union (WCTU) came out in favor of women's suffrage, which she called the "home protection ballot." The next year, in 1877, the WCTU hired Emma Barrett Molloy who conducted a large and popular tour throughout the state. The Vermont WCTU decided unanimously in 1879 that women needed the right to vote in order to better influence politics. In 1879, they petitioned the Vermont State Legislature to allow taxpaying women to vote in school elections. The state WCTU was instrumental in securing the right to vote at school district meetings in the state in 1880. Because of this success, AWSA planned for a series of summer speakers in 1881. These events included Henry Browne Blackwell, Julia Ward Howe, and Lucy Stone. The meetings were reportedly "sparsely attended."

The VWSA began to reorganize in 1883. In that year, Maria Hidden was given the job of revitalizing the group. Hidden was elected president of VWSA in 1884. She corresponded with the New England Woman Suffrage Association (NEWSA) and kept them informed. Hannah Tracy Cutler from AWSA, was another speaker sent to Vermont in 1883 to promote women's suffrage. Blackwell, Howe and Stone attended the suffrage convention held in St. Johnsbury in November of 1883.

In January of 1884, the executive committee of VWSA met and announced they would be petitioning for women's municipal suffrage. By May of 1884, Hidden reported to NEWSA that she had organized suffrage groups in twenty nine Vermont towns. The1884 petition for women's suffrage had a total of 3,178 signatures. On November 22, 1884, a municipal suffrage bill was introduced to the Vermont state House. The initial hearing was favorable towards women's suffrage. Over the weekend, opposition to the bill grew and it was defeated 113 to 69. Despite the loss, suffragists working in the state felt optimistic about an eventual win. In preparation for the next legislative session, VWSA organized local groups and distributed pro-suffrage literature. On November 3, 1886 the municipal suffrage bill passed the Vermont state house. Suffragists and anti-suffragists alike closely watched the progress of the proposed legislation. A leading anti-suffragist was sent to lobby against it, and the bill did not pass in the state senate.

Suffragists were optimistic going into 1888 that the state would pass a municipal suffrage bill. Already, several major organizations, including the Vermont Republican Party, had come out in support of women's suffrage that April. But when the municipal suffrage bill was introduced in the house, the Judiciary Committee was hostile to it and it was defeated.

== Continuing efforts ==
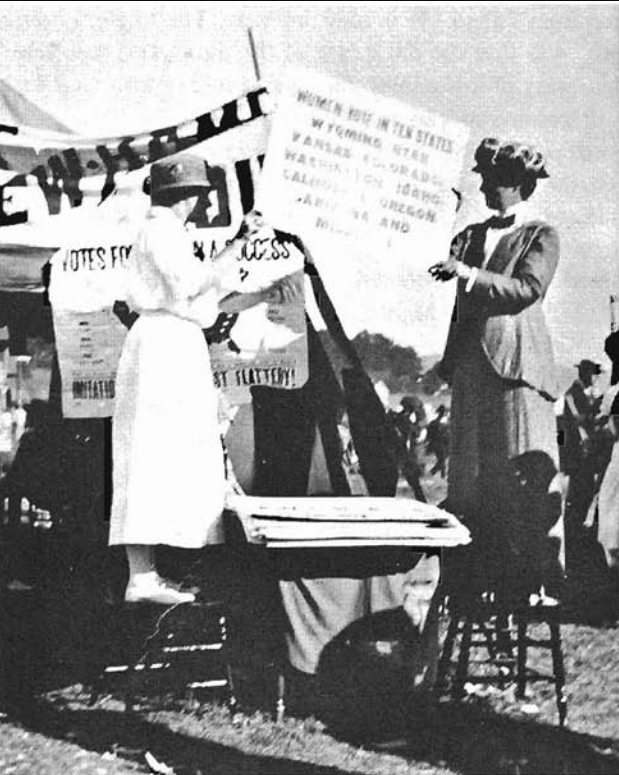
New Hampshire and Vermont WSA members at Vermont State Fair held at White River Junction, 1912

Petitions for Municipal Suffrage for Women Taxpayers were presented to the state senate in 1900. In the state legislature, hearings were granted by the Judiciary Committee for a women's suffrage bill which failed to pass. Another women's suffrage petition was presented to the state senate and this was sent along, as a "joke," to the "Committee on the Insane." In 1902, both Municipal Suffrage and Presidential suffrage bills were introduced to the state legislature. Neither passed, despite activists presenting petitions with around 15,000 signatures in favor of women's suffrage.

Another attempt to give women the vote in Vermont came in 1906 when a bill was introduced to change the laws around voting by substituting the word "person" for "male" in the state statutes. In October, the bill passed the House and the news concerned the Massachusetts Association Opposed to the Further Extension of Suffrage to Women (MAOFESW) who sent a member of their group to lobby against the measure. The anti-suffrage lobbyists caused suffragists to request a public hearing on the bill. In the state senate, it failed by three votes.

In 1907, the VWSA rebranded as the Vermont Equal Suffrage Association (VESA). Julia Pierce became the first president. At the state suffrage convention held in 1907 in Burlington, Anna Howard Shaw was a featured speaker who donated to the VESA campaign. VESA had expanded throughout Vermont by 1912. Frances H. Rastall, who was an experienced temperance and suffrage activist from Kansas, came to Vermont in 1912 to aid with the municipal suffrage bill. The 1912 bill included a poll tax which caused problems for the suffragists and temperance activists who wanted to expand the franchise to women.

In May of 1914, VESA members organized meetings and picnics throughout major towns in the state. The president of VESA was Grace Willey Sherwood in 1916.

Suffragists like Annette W. Parmelee helped rejuvenate the suffrage mission in Vermont. Parmelee raised awareness of women's suffrage by writing to local news outlets and seeking audiences with politicians. In December of 1908, she addressed the State House on "taxation without representation." Her experiences with politicians, who she felt were emotional and crass, convinced her even more that women should be involved in politics. She believed that women would push back against "greed and lust" in the political arena. Initially, she received harsh treatment by the press who tried to brand her as an "unladylike" radical. By 1910, Parmelee's addresses to the state legislature was receiving favorable attention from the press. Attendees of her speech included Burlington High School, the Northfield Cadets and "several hundred visitors." Parmelee wrote a satire about women's suffrage called "Man's Suffrage Bill." It was performed in conjunction with the WCTU in 1911. Parmelee's activism inspired other suffragists, including L. J. C. Daniels. Daniels, a property owner in Grafton, began a campaign of refusing to pay her taxes in order to protest her disenfranchisement. Daniels publicized her protest, explaining why she took this stance in the local paper. Her protest did lead to greater awareness and acceptance of women's suffrage in the state. Daniels was instrumental in having a suffrage parade in Grafton in 1914.

During the state legislative session of 1916 and 1917, six different woman's suffrage proposals were considered by lawmakers in Vermont. Anti-suffragists came out in force to fight against women's suffrage. A municipal woman's suffrage bill was submitted on February 27, 1917 and later amended throughout March, finally passing and signed into law on March 30. After it was signed into law, Vermont women were the first in New England to earn the right to vote in municipal elections.

Later that year, on November 10, 1917, Daniels and forty other women picketed and protested outside the White House. Daniels was arrested and served fifteen days in prison. On February 24, 1919, Daniels and other women in the NWP protested President Wilson's visit to Boston.

Governor Percival Clement refused to sign the presidential suffrage bill passed in 1919, calling it "unconstitutional." He vetoed it on February 20, 1919. When only one more state was needed to ratify the Nineteenth Amendment in 1920, suffragists requested that Governor Clement call for a special legislative session. On April of 1920, more than 400 women marched on the Vermont capitol, but Governor Clement refused activists again.

Vermont finally ratified the Nineteenth Amendment on February 8, 1921.

== Antisuffragists in Vermont ==
Opponents of women's suffrage in Vermont claimed that women didn't really want to vote, or that they did not belong in the public sphere. Some believed that if women acted independently from men, that it would "destroy the cohesiveness of family life."

In 1870, antisuffragists canvassed women's opinions on whether they wanted to vote and created a campaign to encourage women to sign a petition against women's suffrage.

== See also ==
- List of Vermont suffragists
- Timeline of women's suffrage in Vermont
- Timeline of women's suffrage in the United States
- Women's suffrage in the United States
