= Timeline of women's suffrage in Vermont =

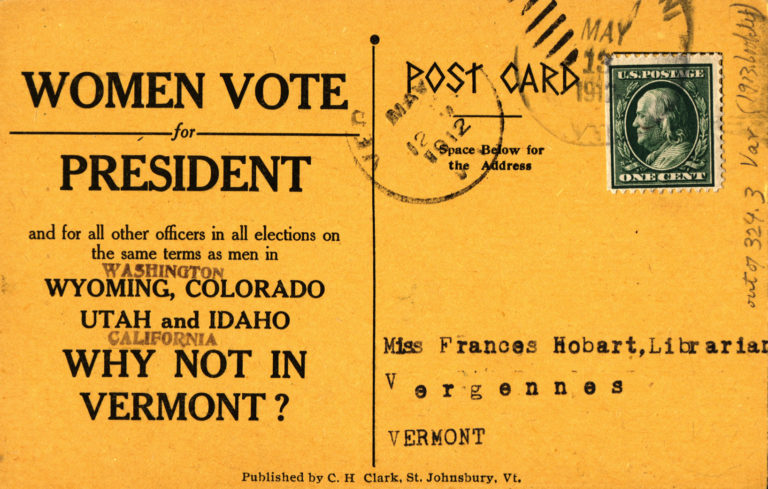
Why Not in Vermont? Postcard, 1912

This is a timeline of women's suffrage in Vermont. Women's suffrage efforts began in the 1850s and intensified in the 1870s. The Woman's Christian Temperance Union (WCTU) of Vermont was very active in women's suffrage efforts. Different strategies were used and finally, in 1917, women in Vermont were able to vote in municipal elections. Eventually, Vermont women were fully enfranchised by the Nineteenth Amendment.

== 1800s ==
=== 1850s ===
1852

- Clarina I. H. Nichols petitions the state legislature for women's right to vote, but was unsuccessful.

1854

- Lucy Stone gives a women's rights speech in Randolph.

1858

- A Free Convention held at Rutland creates a petition for women's suffrage, but the state legislature does not take up the issue.

=== 1860s ===
1869

- During the state constitutional convention, a women's suffrage amendment was proposed by the Vermont Council of Censors, first as a joke, but was later taken seriously by the State Legislature; the amendment still fails.

=== 1870s ===
"A Last Resort" by Harvey Howes, 1870

1870

- January: The Vermont Woman Suffrage Association (VWSA) is formed by men.
- February: American Woman Suffrage Association (AWSA) members arrive in Montpelier to campaign, going on to other cities including Burlington, Montpelier, St. Albans, and St. Johnsbury.
- June: VWSA presents the women's suffrage issue to the Council of Censors' convention to update the state constitution. It is defeated with only one yes vote by legislator, Harvey Howes.

1872

- Two women's suffrage proposals go to the state legislature: one for taxpaying women to vote in school elections and the other for full equal suffrage. Neither passes.

1879

- The Vermont Woman's Christian Temperance Union (WCTU) is formed and advocates for women's school suffrage.

=== 1880s ===
1880

- Women in Vermont are able to vote on "all questions pertaining to schools and school officers in cities, towns and graded school districts."
- The Vermont WCTU successfully advocated for women taxpayers receive the right to vote at school district meetings.

1881

- Summer: AWSA plans a series of suffrage meetings for the state.

1883

- September: Hannah Tracy Cutler speaks on temperance and women's suffrage in Cambridge.
- November 8-9: First state suffrage convention is held at St. Johnsbury.

1884

- January: VWSA executive committee meets and announces they will petition the state legislature for municipal suffrage.
- May: Twenty nine Vermont towns have organized suffrage groups by May.
- November 22: A municipal suffrage bill is introduced to the state House.
- The Municipal Suffrage bill does not pass.

1886

- November 3: A municipal suffrage bill is introduced to the state House and passes by 135 to 89.
- The suffrage bill does not pass.
- The Vermont WCTU endorses women's suffrage.

1887

- The VWSA proposes a municipal suffrage bill.
- September: Frances Willard visits and speaks in Vermont.

1888

- April: The Vermont Republican Party endorses women's suffrage.
- The Vermont WCTU publishes the series, "Resolutions Relating to Women's Rights, Temperance, and Other Reforms.
- November: Another Municipal Suffrage Bill is introduced to the state House, but does not pass. Defeated 37 to 192.
- The Prohibition Party forms a Vermont chapter that has backing from the state temperance and suffrage activists.

=== 1890s ===
1890

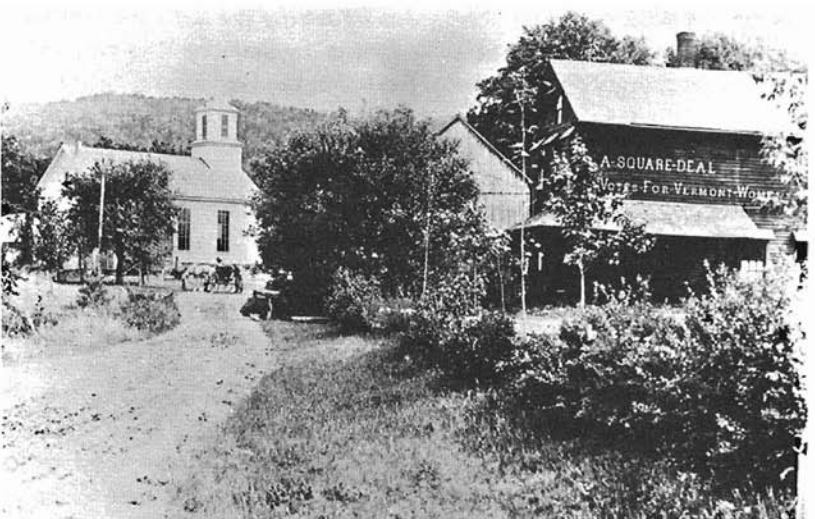
"A Square Deal for Vermont Women" Grafton, 1890

- The Vermont Methodists and Free Baptists come out in official support for women's suffrage.
- A Municipal Suffrage Bill is introduced to the state House and does not pass.

1892

- Wendell Phillips Stafford introduces a Municipal Suffrage Bill in the state House, but it does pass the state Senate.
- Women are allowed to vote on school issues at town meetings.

1894

- A Municipal Suffrage Bill is reintroduced in the state House by Hosea Mann, but it is defeated.

1896

- The Municipal Suffrage Bill is introduced in the state Senate, where it passes, but it does not make it through the state House this time.
- VWSA has its greatest membership in this year at 276 members.

1898

- Over 2,500 Vermont citizens present a petition for women's Municipal Suffrage to the state legislature, and though a bill is introduced, it is unsuccessful.

== 1900s ==
=== 1900s ===
1900

- Petitions for women's suffrage lead to another bill being unsuccessfully introduced into the state legislature.
- June 12-13: Henry Browne Blackwell speaks at the state suffrage convention held in Waterbury Center, Vermont.

1901

- June 25-26: The state suffrage convention meets in Rochester.

1902

- The Vermont Baptist Association comes out in favor of allowing women to vote on limited issues relating to prohibition.
- The Universalist Church in the state endorsed full equal suffrage for women.
- Both Municipal and Presidential suffrage bills are introduced into the state legislature, but do not pass.
- June 18-19: The state suffrage convention is held in West Concord.

1903

- June 9-10: The state suffrage convention is held in Barton.

1904

- June 22-23: The state suffrage convention is held in Woodstock.
- November: The state legislature considers a Municipal Suffrage bill, but it does not pass both houses.

1905

- Around 10,000 copies of a pamphlet, "Opinions on Equal Suffrage by Vermont Men and Women," was distributed throughout the state.
- June 7-8: State suffrage convention takes place in Springfield.

1906

- June 6-7: The state suffrage convention is held in Brattleboro.
- October 24: An attempt to change the statues for voting by substituting "person" for "male" passes the state House, but is later narrowly defeated in the state senate.

1907

- June 13-14: The state suffrage convention takes place in Burlington. Anna Howard Shaw is a featured speaker.

1908

- December: Annette W. Parmelee addresses the Vermont state house on the subject of women's suffrage and "taxation without representation."

=== 1910s ===
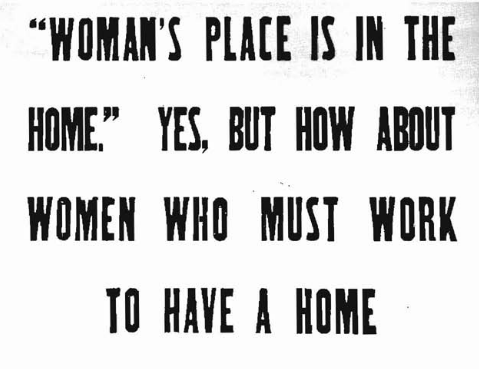
"Woman's Place is in the Home." Yes, But How About Women Who Must Work to Have a Home 1912 VWSA placard

1910

- May 28: Parmelee requests a proposed amendment to the State Constitution for women's suffrage.
- A Municipal suffrage bill fails to pass in the state legislature.

1911

- May: Parmelee and the Vermont WCTU stage a suffrage satire called "Man's Suffrage Bill," in Bristol.

1912

- A bill to allow women to vote in town meetings about taxes and fund appropriates is introduced and passed in the Senate, but fails in the House.

1914

- May: VESA hosts meetings and picnics in fourteen Vermont towns.

1915

- January 21: A public hearing on bills for women's Municipal and Presidential suffrage is heard.
- February 2: Anti-suffrage speakers attend the senate hearing, the suffrage bill eventually fails.

1917

- February 27: A municipal suffrage bill comes out of the state House committee.
- March 8: The same bill is reintroduced and amended.
- March 21: The bill passes.
- March 30: The bill is signed into law. Vermont women earned partial suffrage at the city and town level, where they could vote for officers, except for "road commissioners."
- November 10: L. J. C. Daniels marches and protests at the White House with other women in the NWP.

1919

- February 20: Governor Percival W. Clement vetoes the presidential women's suffrage bill.
- February 24: Daniels and twenty one other women from the NWP protest President Wilson's Boston visit.

=== 1920s ===
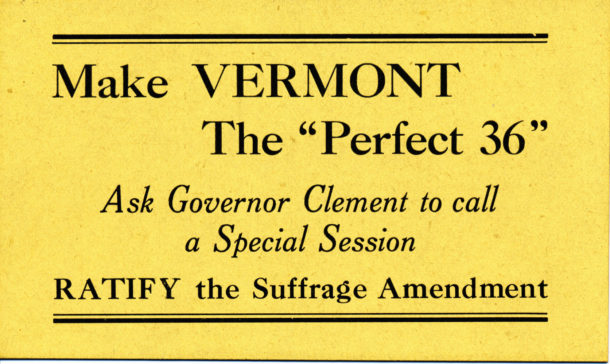
Make Vermont the 'Perfect 36' c. 1920

1920

- April: Around 400 women demand that Governor Clement call a special session to ratify the Nineteenth Amendment; Clement refuses.
- July 1-2: The state suffrage convention is held in St. Albans.
- July 2: The Vermont League of Women Voters is formed.

1921

- February 8: Vermont ratifies the Nineteenth Amendment.

== See also ==
- List of Vermont suffragists
- Women's suffrage in Vermont
- Timeline of women's suffrage in the United States
- Women's suffrage in the United States
