= Aurelius O. Carpenter =

American photographer, writer, and abolitionist (1836–1919)

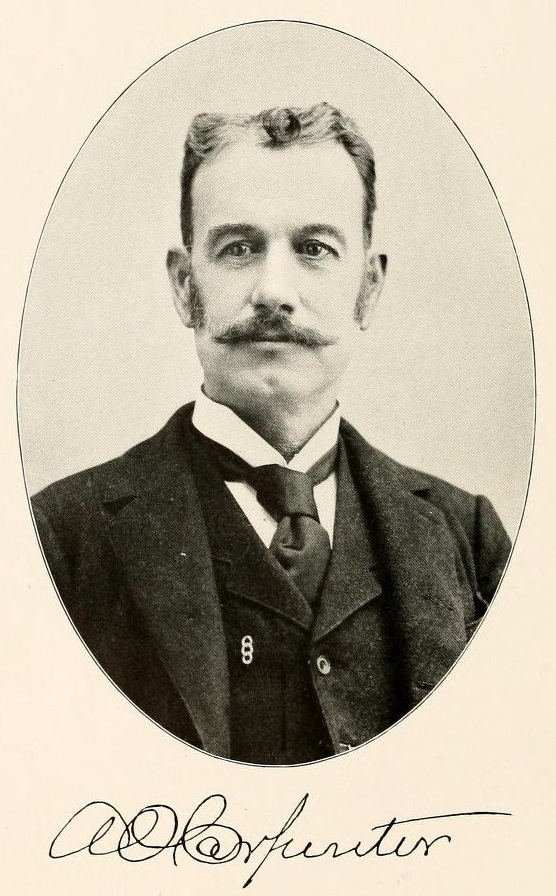
- Born: 1836; Vermont, U.S.
- Died: 1919 (aged 82–83); Ukiah, California, U.S.
- Resting place: Ukiah Cemetery, Ukiah, California
- Known for: Photography of early Mendocino County, California
- Spouse: Helen McCowan

Aurelius Ormando Carpenter (1836–1919) was an American photographer, writer and abolitionist. He was one of the earliest photographers in early American California, photographing Mendocino County, California. He was the son of Clarina I. H. Nichols and the father of Grace Carpenter Hudson and Grant Carpenter. Prior to moving to California, he was active in the abolitionist movement, fighting with John Brown in the Battle of Black Jack.

== Life ==
Aurelius Carpenter was born in 1836 in Vermont. His mother was Clarina I. H. Nichols. As a teenager, he had an apprenticeship at the Windham County Democrat, the newspaper owned by his stepfather, George Nichols.

In 1854 (or 1855), Carpenter, his mother, and his brother, Chapin, left Vermont for Kansas, to support abolitionist activities. Carpenter joined abolitionist John Brown on June 2, 1856, fighting in the Battle of Black Jack.

Carpenter married writer and photographer Helen McCowan in late 1856. He had met McCowan while he was recovering from injuries sustained during the battle and she had served as Carpenter's nurse. He headed further west with Helen, to California. Helen's family had moved to California, where her brother joined the mining industry. The couple settled in Potter Valley in Mendocino County in 1859. It was in Potter Valley where Carpenter started the first newspaper in Mendocino County, the Mendocino Herald. He also wrote for the San Francisco Fair Daily and the Ukiah City Press.

Eventually, the couple relocated to Ukiah. They started a commercial photography studio, which they operated for 40 years. They had a daughter, Grace and a son, Grant.

In September 1896, the Carpenter's hosted Susan B. Anthony at their home in Ukiah when Anthony visited the city to speak at a rally.

Carpenter died in 1919 in Ukiah, California.

== Work ==
Carpenter's work focused on the early development of 19th and 20th century Mendocino County, California. Carpenter photographed panoramas of the coast, forests, and early industry, including logging and shipping. He documented the Pomo people and early white settlers, including Charmian London.

In the 1960s, 700 glass plate negatives of Carpenter's photographers were found in the basement of the Sun House in Ukiah, the home where Carpenter's daughter Grace Hudson and her husband, John Hudson, lived. Local Ukiah photographer Robert Lee gathered the negatives and researched and created prints of the negatives, documenting the subjects seen in the images. It took forty years for Lee to complete the project. As a result, the first exhibition of Carpenter's work was held in 2006 at the Grace Hudson Museum, also celebrating the museum's 20th anniversary.

His works are held in the collection of the Sonoma County Library, SFMOMA, and the Grace Hudson Museum.
