= Grant Carpenter =

American journalist

- Born: Louis Grant Carpenter; February 21, 1865; Potter Valley, California
- Died: April 30, 1936 (aged 71); Hollywood
- Education: University of Michigan
- Occupations: Newspaperman; attorney; writer

Grant Carpenter (1865–1936) was a newspaperman, attorney, and writer, and twin brother of artist Grace Carpenter Hudson.

As a youth, Carpenter worked as an apprentice to a printer, and later as a newspaper reporter for the San Francisco Examiner. He studied law at the University of Michigan, and after earning his law degree, became an attorney for the Chinese Six Companies in San Francisco, and later served as an Assistant District Attorney. He became involved in San Francisco's performing arts circles, writing continued to be an interest, and he served as president of several associations, including the San Francisco Press Club.

In 1916, he moved to Manhattan, New York City, to begin a new career as a writer. In the 1920s, he moved to Los Angeles, California and pursued writing for Hollywood. He was the author of two plays, The Dragon's Claws and The Concubine, several film scenarios, and two novels, Long Sweetening: A Romance of the Red Woods (New York: Robert M. McBride & Company, 1921, 306 pp.) and The Night Tide, A Story of Old Chinatown (The H. K. Fly Company, New York, 1920, 319 pp.). He served as president of the Screen Writers Guild and vice-president of the Authors League of America, now the Authors Guild.

== Personal ==
Carpenter was born on February 21, 1865, in Potter Valley, Mendocino County, California, a son of the noted photographer Aurelius O. Carpenter and Helen (née McCowen) Carpenter. He married first Sophia Storm, with whom he had two children. He married second to pianist and singer Mercedes Woodford, whose father was a mining engineer for the Kimberley diamond mines in South Africa. His third wife was writer Medora Block. He died on April 30, 1936, in Hollywood, Los Angeles County, California, and is interred in the Russian River Cemetery in Ukiah, Mendocino County, California, alongside his twin sister, artist Grace Carpenter Hudson. There is a documented friendship between Carpenter and fellow writer Rose Wilder Lane. The two exchanged letters beginning in the mid-twenties until shortly before Carpenter's death. Lane's letters to Carpenter focused on politics of the time, her personal life, their mutual friends in the arts, farming, reminiscences of their early friendship, and also mentions medical problems Carpenter referred to in his letters to Lane. There are long gaps between the dates of some of the letters, as well as comments on Lane's part indicating that she has not forgotten about writing to him, indicating that their communication was sporadic.
