= Grace Hudson =

American artist (1865–1937)

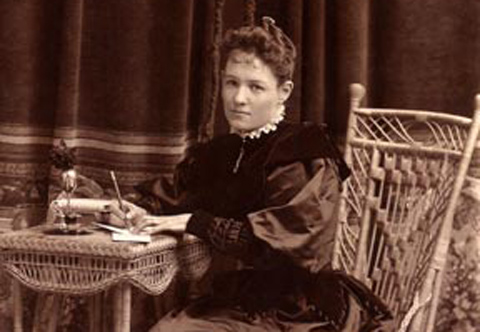
- Photograph of Grace Hudson, c. 1895
- Born: Grace Carpenter; February 21, 1865; Potter Valley, California, U.S.
- Died: March 23, 1937 (aged 72); Ukiah, California, U.S.
- Known for: Painting
- Spouse(s): William T. Davis, John Hudson

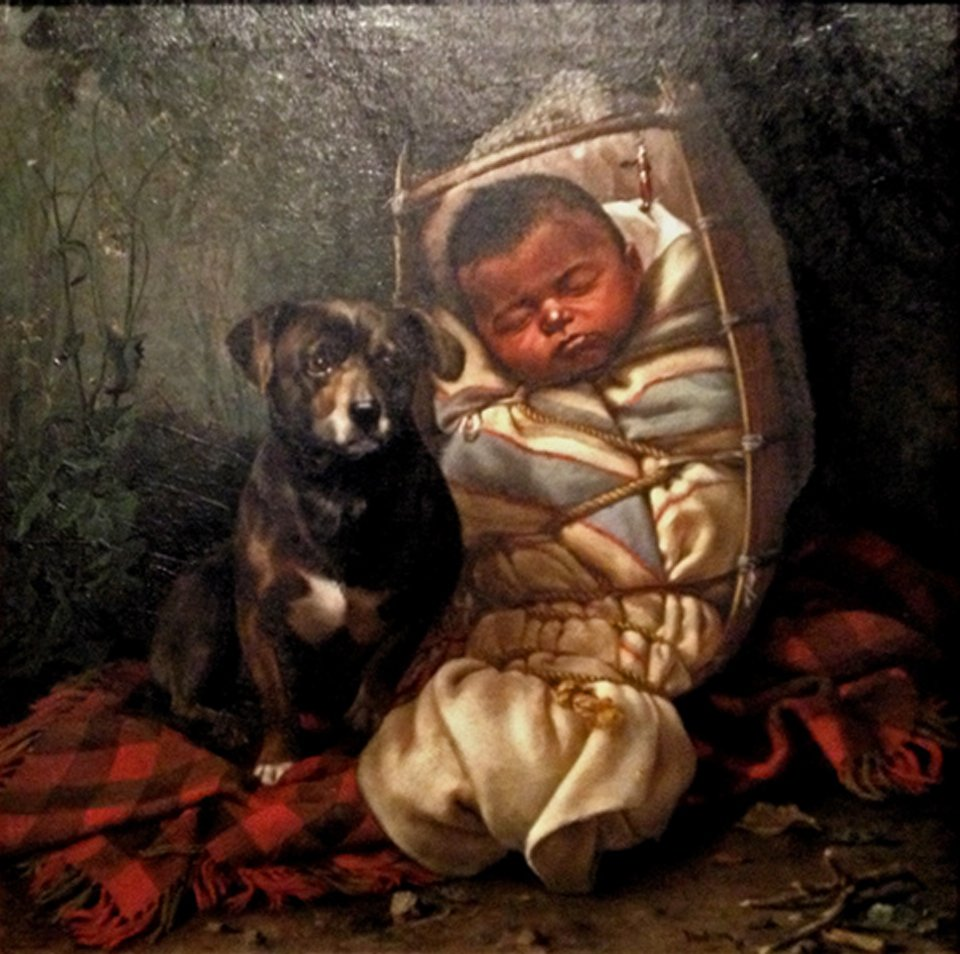
National Thorn, painted in 1891, proved very popular and resulted in many requests for similar works

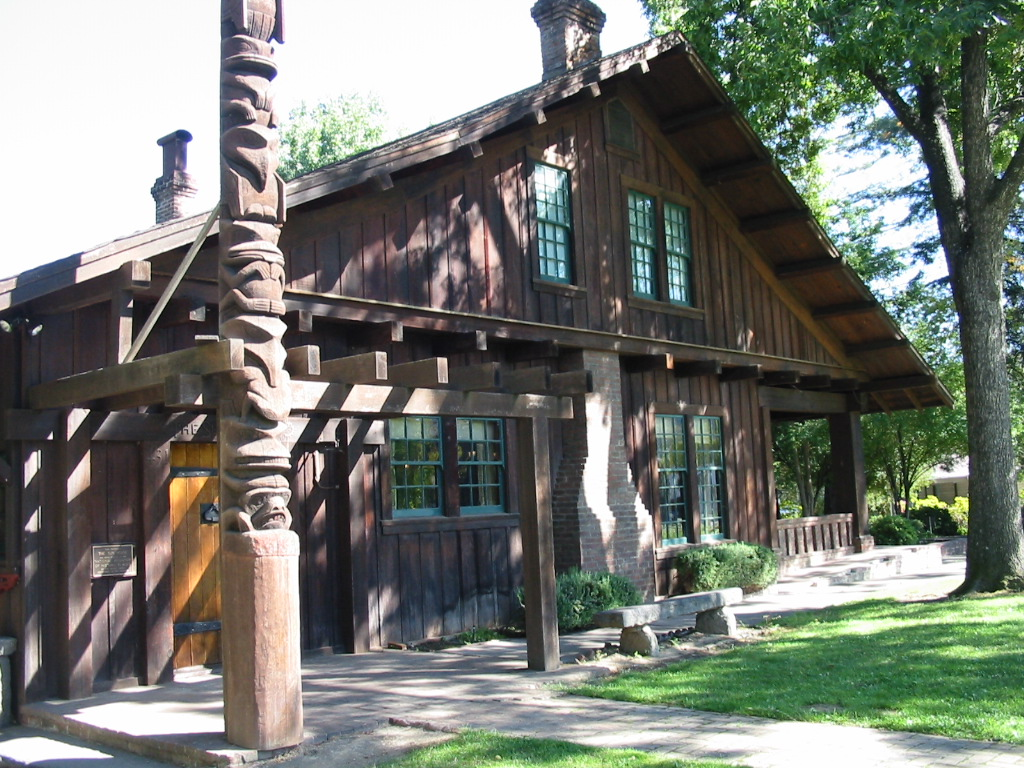
The Sun House contained a large painting studio for Grace, a small reading study for John and modest living quarters for them both

Grace Carpenter Hudson (1865–1937) was an American painter based in Northern California. She was nationally known during her lifetime for a numbered series of more than 684 portraits of local Pomo communities. She painted the first, National Thorn, after her marriage in 1891. Her last work was completed in 1935.

== Early life ==
Grace Carpenter was born on February 21, 1865, in Potter Valley, California. Her mother Helen McCowen was one of the first white school teachers educating Pomo children and was a commercial portrait photographer in Ukiah, California; her father Aurelius Ormando Carpenter was a skilled panoramic and landscape photographer who chronicled early Mendocino County frontier enterprises such as logging, shipping and railroading. Her paternal grandmother was Clarina I. H. Nichols.

At fourteen years of age, Grace was sent to attend the recently established San Francisco School of Design, an art school that emphasized painting from nature rather than from memory or by copying existing works. At sixteen, she executed an award-winning, full-length, life-sized self-portrait in crayon. While in San Francisco, she met and eloped with William Davis, a man fifteen years her senior. This action upset her parents and ended her formal studies. The marriage lasted only a year.

From 1885 to 1890, Grace Carpenter Davis lived with her parents in Ukiah painting, teaching and rendering illustrations for magazines such as Cosmopolitan and Overland Monthly. Her work at that time had no particular focus and included genre, landscapes, portraits and still lifes in all media. Later in her career she would continue to accept occasional magazine illustration assignments, including ones for Sunset.

== Marriage to John Hudson ==
In 1890, she married John Wilz Napier Hudson, M.D. (1857–1936). He had come to California from Nashville, Tennessee, in 1889 to serve as physician for the San Francisco and North Pacific Railroad. The newlyweds shared a keen interest in preserving and recording Native American culture.

== Professional success ==
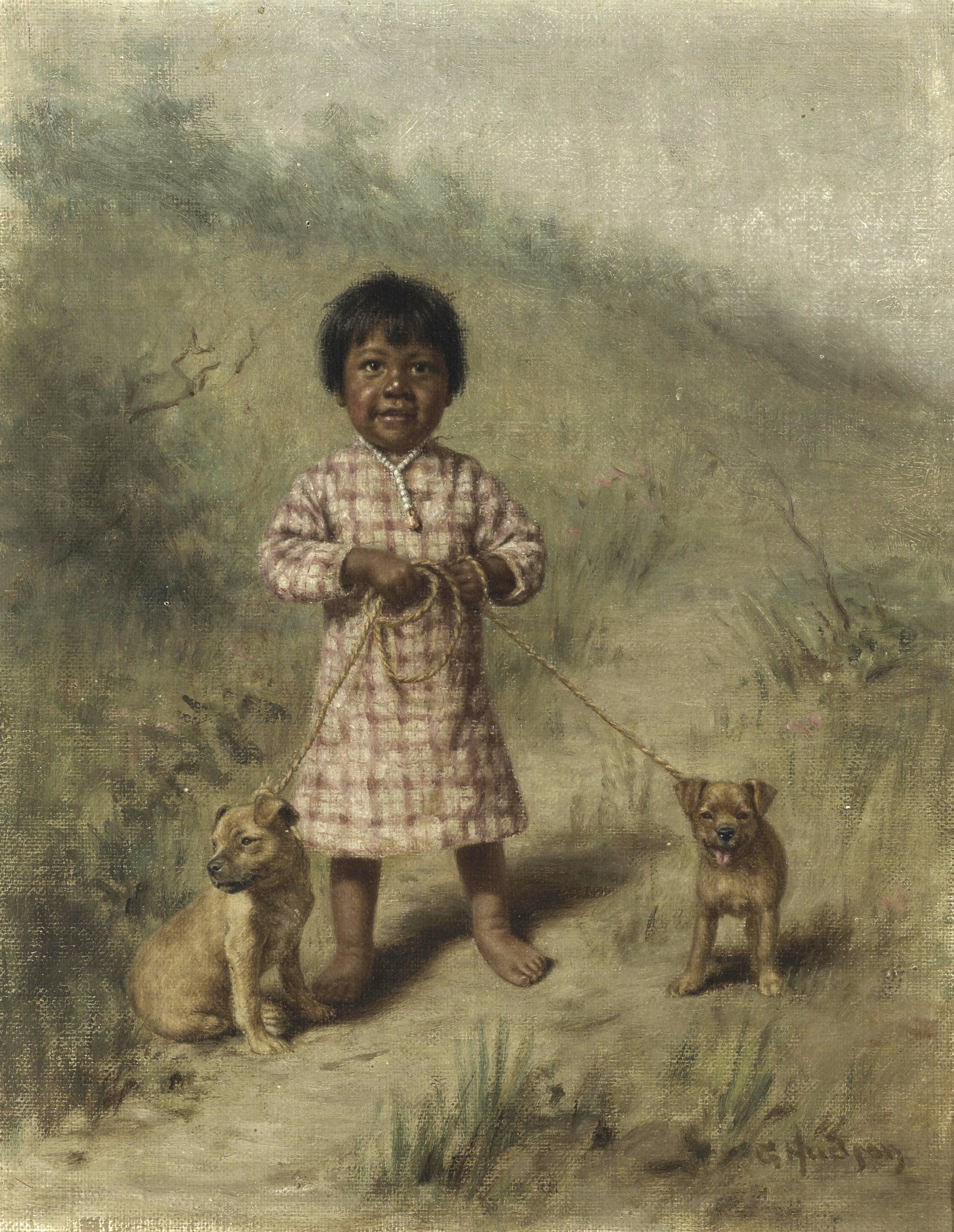
Greenie with two yellow puppies, 1896

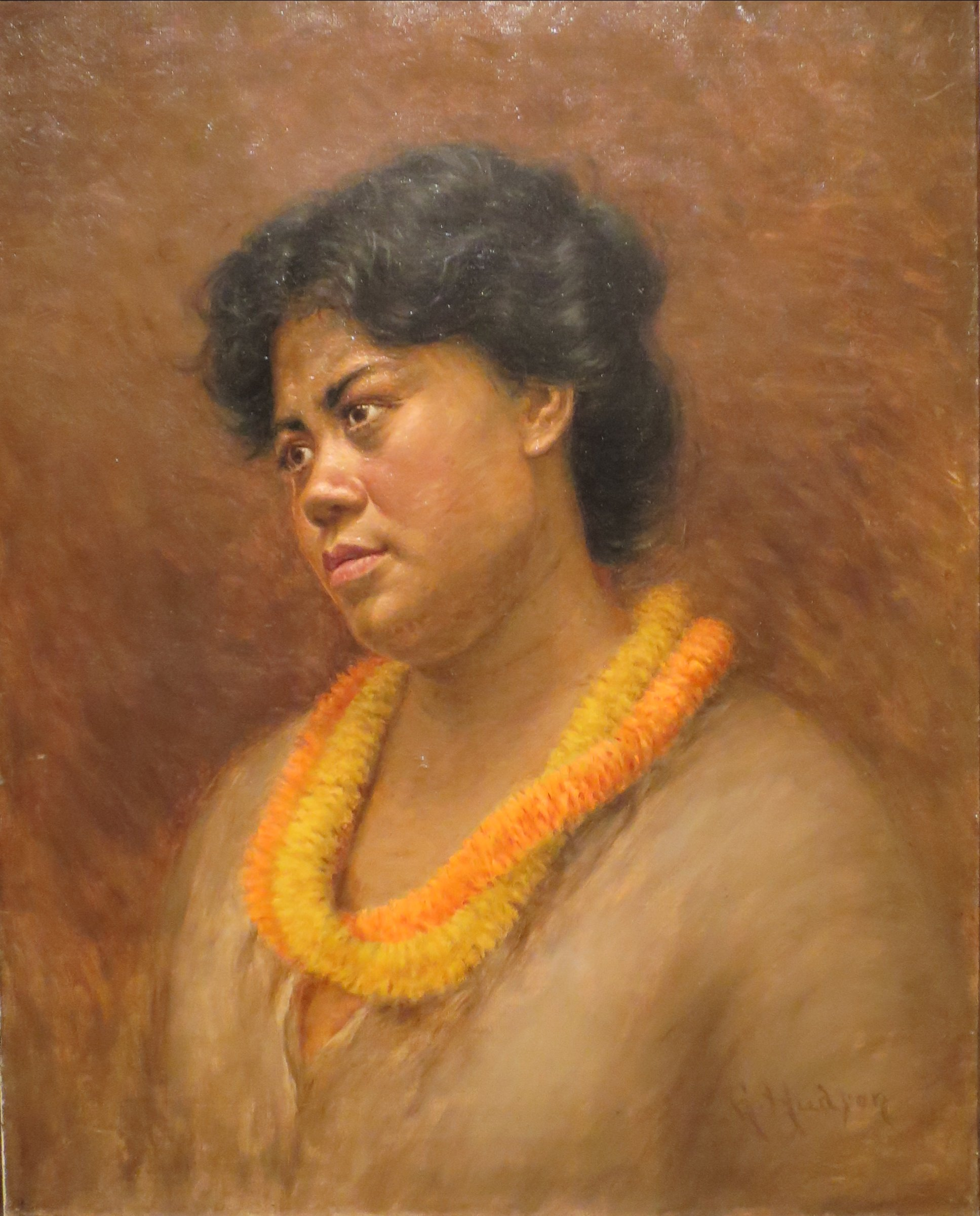
Hapa Haole (No. 206), 1901

Grace Carpenter Hudson painted National Thorn in 1891; it was selected to be shown at the Minneapolis Art Association exhibit, where it proved very popular. Her painting Little Mendocino (another Pomo infant portrait) was exhibited in the California State Building at the 1893 Chicago World's Fair. The painting received much attention and earned an honorable mention. In 1894, Little Mendocino was hung at the Midwinter Fair in San Francisco, resulting in Hudson gaining further commissions for works in a similar vein.

By 1895, Grace Hudson's growing success as a popular artist was bringing in more than enough money for the couple to live in modest comfort. Her husband John gave up his medical practice in order to study the Pomo people and follow his deep interests in archeology and ethnography. His collection of California Indian baskets and other Native American artifacts is held among the Smithsonian Institution, the Field Museum of Natural History in Chicago, the Brooklyn Museum, and the Grace Hudson Museum in Ukiah. The latter's research collection is based on John Hudson's manuscripts and correspondence.

An 1895 San Francisco Call piece on Grace Hudson was reprinted in the November 5, 1895, issue of The New York Times, entitled "Very Hard to Get Papooses to Pose." In it, she details her method of photographing or painting Pomo infants without their mother's knowledge by means of deceit. Hudson said that because of the Indigenous belief that being sketched or photographed would result in a negative outcome, she had to use elaborate ruses to make private portraits of the infants.

From this time forward, Hudson meticulously photographed and documented each of her works; she was concerned that numerous counterfeit copies were being produced. Her notes were intended to establish her copyright. Each of her works is numbered in sequence. She often used the camera as the initial basis for her oil portraits, as it allowed the human subject to be captured quickly. She took pains to conceal this practical convenience from the art world, as it was considered an inferior method at the time.

In 1900-1901, Grace Hudson had become exhausted from supplying the demand for her popular paintings; she took a solo vacation in the Territory of Hawaii, to relax and refresh herself. While there, she completed 26 paintings of island scenes and ethnic Japanese, Chinese and Hawaiian people. While she was away, John Hudson became the Pacific Coast ethnologist for the Field Columbian Museum. He documented Northern California Native activities, and made an extensive study of Aboriginal fish trapping methods.

Returning to the mainland, Grace rejoined her husband and resumed work supplying sentimental Pomo portraits to eager buyers. She accompanied John on much of his field work. In 1902, she painted a portrait of a Pawnee boy; her husband had been documenting the Pawnee on assignment for the Field Columbian Museum.

In 1904, Grace Hudson accepted a commission from the Field Columbian Museum to go to the Oklahoma Territory for an extended period and paint additional images of the Pawnee. This people had suffered high mortality after epidemics of European diseases and disruption of their society. There she made portraits primarily of chiefs and elders, preserved in photographic negatives and canvas. While the Hudsons were still in Oklahoma, some of their collected artifacts and Hudson's paintings were destroyed in San Francisco's calamitous fire following the 1906 earthquake.

== Grace Hudson Museum and Sun House ==
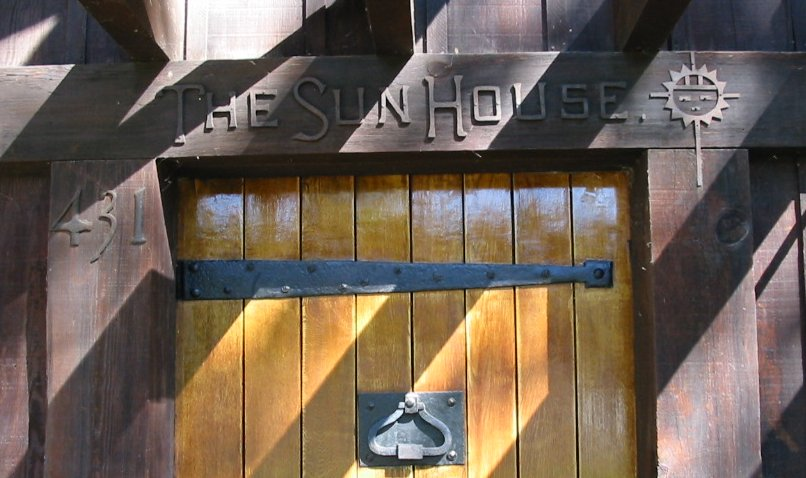
Hopi sun symbol over the front door of The Sun House

Returning to Ukiah, California, Grace and John Hudson lived according to a modest bohemian lifestyle of collecting, traveling, field work, reading, entertaining, photography, and painting. In 1911 their The Sun House in Ukiah was completed. They had designed this Craftsman-style redwood California bungalow. The Hudsons adopted the Hopi sun symbol as their family symbol; the emblem is prominently displayed over the front door of the house. John Hudson died there in 1936. Grace Hudson died there on March 24, 1937.

Grace Hudson left The Sun House and its land to her nephew, Mark Carpenter. Carpenter preserved the house and its 30,000 collected objects for posterity, giving it to the City of Ukiah. It operates the house and the adjoining Grace Hudson Museum. Today, the Sun House is California Historical Landmark #926, and is listed in the National Register of Historic Places. The Sun House and Museum are within the 0.8 acre Hudson-Carpenter city park. The museum's website says of Grace Hudson that "...her work enjoys renewed interest and recognition for its fine and sympathetic portrayals of native peoples."
