= Hosea Mann =

American politician

Hosea A. Mann Jr.
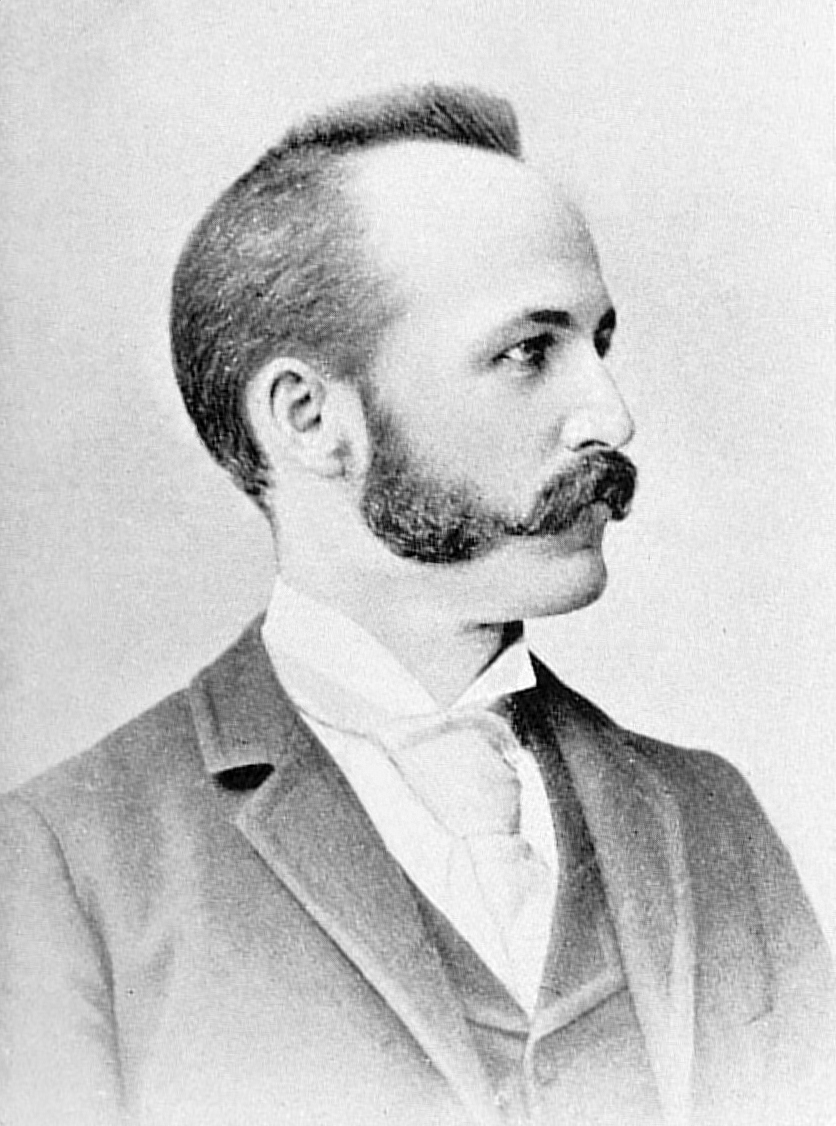

Speaker of the Vermont House of Representatives
- In office 1890–1892
- Preceded by: Henry R. Start
- Succeeded by: William W. Stickney

Member of the Vermont House of Representatives
- In office 1886–1892
- Preceded by: Oscar E. Butterfield
- Succeeded by: Eli H. Porter
- Constituency: Wilmington

State's Attorney of Windham County, Vermont
- In office 1886–1888
- Preceded by: Francis A. Bolles
- Succeeded by: Francis A. Bolles

Personal details
- Born: July 13, 1858 Wilmington, Vermont, U.S.
- Died: September 7, 1948 (aged 90) Brattleboro, Vermont, U.S.
- Resting place: Riverview Cemetery, Wilmington, Vermont, U.S.
- Party: Republican
- Spouse: Eva A. Gifford (m. 1880)
- Children: 1
- Education: Eastman Business College
- Profession: Attorney

Hosea A. Mann Jr. (July 13, 1858 – September 7, 1948) was a Vermont lawyer and politician.

Mann born in Wilmington, Vermont, on July 13, 1858, the son of Hosea and Maria (Grousbeck) Mann. Mann was educated in the common schools and at the Brattleboro Academy and Eastman's Business College in Poughkeepsie, New York.

He read law under O. E. Butterfield and was admitted to the bar at Windham County in 1882, commencing a practice in Wilmington. In 1879 Mann was elected treasurer of the Wilmington Savings Bank and Wilmington town clerk. He held both positions until resigning in 1885 to focus on other matters. In 1886 Mann was elected state's attorney for Windham County, serving a two-year term.

Mann was elected to the Vermont House of Representatives in 1886, 1888, and 1890, and served as Speaker of the House from 1890 to 1892.

Mann was married in February 1880 to Eva A. Gifford, daughter of the Reverend Jeremiah and Jane Gifford of Wilmington. They had one son, Ralph Hosea.

He died in Brattleboro, Vermont while staying at the Brattleboro Retreat, to which he had been admitted three weeks previously. Mann was buried at Riverview Cemetery in Wilmington.

== Sources ==
- Men of Vermont: an illustrated biographical history of Vermonters and sons of Vermont. 1894. p. 255.
- Vermont Death Records, 1909–2008, entry for Hosea A. Mann, Jr.
