= Emma Barrett Molloy =

American journalist (1839–1907)

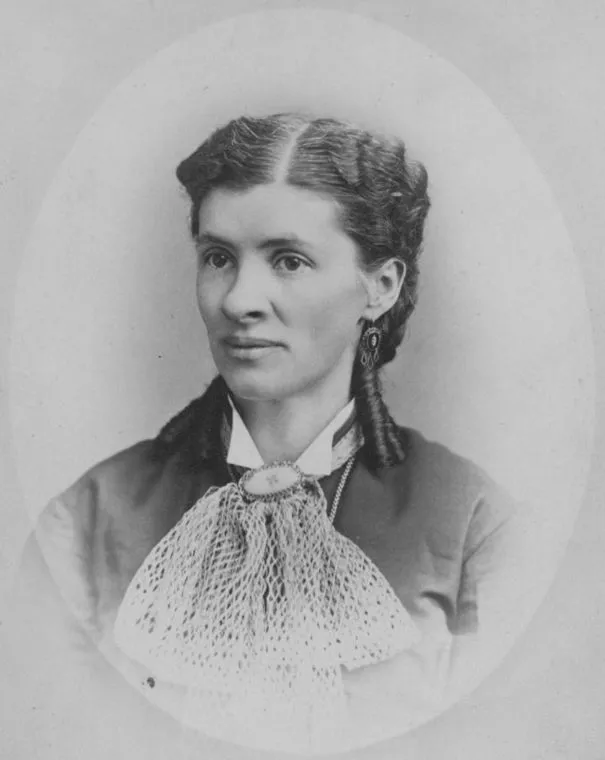
- Emma Barrett Molloy, South Bend, Indiana Suffragist
- Born: July 17, 1839; South Bend, Indiana, U.S.
- Died: May 14, 1907 (aged 67); Cedarville, California, U.S.
- Resting place: Redmens Cemetery, Port Townsend, Washington, U.S.
- Occupations: journalist, social reformer, evangelist

Emma Barrett Molloy (July 17, 1839 – May 14, 1907) was an American journalist, lecturer, temperance and women's rights activist, lecturer and Christian evangelist from South Bend, Indiana. Along with her second husband, Edward Molloy, she co-edited South Bend National Union (1867–71) and the Elkhart Observer (1872–76), becoming the first female newspaper editor in northern Indiana. In addition to writing for her own newspapers, Molloy's articles appeared under her own name or various pseudonyms in other U.S. publications that included The Woman's Journal and The Revolution, two of the top Women's Suffrage journals. Molloy also traveled in the United States and in England as was well known on the lecture circuit as a prohibition activist.

After her first husband's alcoholism led to their divorce in 1867 and her marriage to Edward Molloy a short time later, she became more active in the temperance and suffrage movements as a public speaker. She also joined the Methodist church, which supported prohibition efforts. After divorcing Molloy in 1882 and moving to Illinois, she edited The Morning and Day of Reform, but abandoned her journalism career in 1885. In her later years Molloy continued her temperance activism and evangelism. She moved west to Kansas and Missouri before settling in Port Townsend, Washington, in 1888. She died in California.

== Early life and education ==
Emily F. Barett was born on July 17, 1839, to Harriet (Newton) and William Lovell Barrett in South Bend in St. Joseph County, Indiana. Her parents had migrated to Indiana from New York and settled in South Bend about four years before she was born. Her father was a watchmaker; her mother, a teacher. Both of her parents were active in the First Methodist Episcopal Church of South Bend. Emily Barrett, who later used the name of Emma Barrett, was the only one of the family's three children to survive infancy. When her mother died in 1841, her father went to Chicago to find work, leaving two-year-old Emily behind as a boarder with local families. William Barrett returned to South Bend in 1850 and married Harriet Eaker. In addition to a step-mother, Emily also five half-siblings, two sisters and three brothers.

Barrett grew up in South Bend and attended local schools, where she developed her writing and dramatic recitation skills. While still in her teens she sought her independence from family responsibilities and became a schoolteacher. Barrett began teaching in a rural one-room school around the age of fifteen or sixteen. In 1856 she established a school in South Bend, about the same time that her first articles were published in local newspapers. Barrett's poetry appeared in the St. Joseph County Forum; her first published stories appeared under the pseudonym of Nellie More in the St. Joseph Valley Register. The use of pseudonyms allowed Barrett to express herself without exposing her true identity. Although she was best known as Emma Molloy, using the surname of her second husband, and Emma F. Pradt and Emma Barrett, using the surnames of her first and third husbands. She also used several pseudonyms in her published works such as Polly Wiggins, Polly Quiggle, and Mabel Claire, among others.

== Marriage and family ==
In 1858, eighteen-year-old Emily Barrett married Louis A. Pradt, a journeyman printer from Wisconsin, and they moved to Sheboygan, Wisconsin. The couple moved frequently during their marriage and lived Indiana and Alabama, as well as Wisconsin. To help supplement the family income, she occasionally worked as a clerical worker, seamstress, milliner (hatmaker), and laundress while continuing to write. Emma and Louis Pradt had two children; a daughter, Lottie, and a son, Allie, both of whom died in infancy. Barrett divorced Pradt in 1867 under Wisconsin's divorced laws due to "his habitual drunkenness". After the marriage failed, Barrett returned to South Bend, Indiana.

In November 1867, Emma (Barrett) Pradt married Edward Molloy, a New York native, American Civil War veteran, temperance advocate, and editor of the South Bend, Indiana, National Union. Molloy joined her husband as co-editor of the newspaper and wrote local news article. In 1871 the Molloys sold the National Union and moved to Cortland, New York, to edit the Cortland Weekly Journal, but within a year they had returned to Indiana. The Molloys settled in Elkhart, Indiana, where they published the first issue of their new newspaper, the Elkhart Observer in August 1872. Emma Molloy also became more active in the temperance and women's suffrage movements, delivering lectures on these subjects across the United States and in England.

The Molloys were the parents of a son, Franklin; and adopted daughter, De'Etta; and three foster daughters, Cora, Ida, and Emma Lee. After the Molloys divorced in 1882, Emma moved to Elgin, Illinois, with the children, and later moved to Kansas and California. Edward Molloy never remarried and died in 1914. Their son, Franklin, was born in 1870 and drowned in 1886; their daughter, De'Etta (Molloy) Blakeney eventually settled in Baker City, Oregon; the Molloys' foster daughter, Cora Lee, married George Graham in 1875 and later became Cora Lee Juel.

In 1889, Emma Molloy married her cousin, Morris Barrett, a retired printer. They resided in Port Townsend, Washington, and remained married until his death in 1903. The Barretts were foster parents of a daughter, Bessie Birekes.

== Career ==
Molloy's career included work as a journalist, public lecturer, temperance and women's rights activist, and Christian evangelist. In addition to having articles published in several U.S. newspapers, Molloy co-edited and wrote articles for the South Bend National Union and the Elkhart Observer from 1867 to 1876, becoming first female newspaper editor in northern Indiana. In 1882 she moved to Elgin, Illinois, where she was editor of the Morning and Day of Reform, but abandoned her career as a journalist in 1885. Molloy also traveled the country delivering lectures on the topics of temperance and women's rights. In her later years Molloy also served the Methodist Church in an unofficial capacity as an evangelist.

=== Journalist ===
Emma Pradt's marriage to Edward Molloy in 1869 led her into northern Indiana's journalism community, although she had an early interest in the field and her first stories and poetry were published in South Bend newspapers when she as a teenager. In the early years of her career, she also had articles published in several U.S. newspapers that included the Mishawaka [Indiana] Enterprise, Montgomery [Alabama] Mail, Wisconsin Patriot, and the North Iowa Times. Her stories written under the pseudonym of Polly Wiggins appeared in the Wisconsin Capitol and became popular among the newspaper's readers.

Emma and Edward Molloy co-edited the South Bend, Indiana National Union until 1871; shed also co-edited with her husband and wrote for the Elkhart [Indiana] Observer from 1872 until 1876, becoming first female newspaper editor in northern Indiana. Molloy also spent much of her time traveling the country delivering lectures as a temperance and women's rights activist, especially after her husband became editor of the LaPorte County, Indiana, Chronicle in 1878. Her work was also published in other newspapers and journals. After her divorce from Molly in 1882, she moved to Elgin, Illinois, where she edited The Morning and Day of Reform, but abandoned her career as a journalist in 1885. Molloy used her journalism to write and spread awareness on issues important to her such as temperance, women's rights to an education and to divorce their husband, prison reform, half-way houses, and the promotion of women working outside the home.

=== Temperance activist ===
Molloy's experiences with her first husband's alcoholism, as well as her connection to the Methodist Church, led to her rise as one a prominent temperance activist in the United States. In addition to her work with the Methodist Church, the Women's Crusade movement, and the Women's Christian Temperance Union, Molloy worked with other temperance organizations, including the Good Templars and the Ribbon movement, helping organize local chapters.

The 1870s saw a rise in saloons and prostitution in the Elkhart, Indiana, area, which prompted Molloy to publicly address temperance issues. She delivered many lectures for the temperance movement, traveling across the United States to deliver speeches for temperance conferences from 1876 to 1878. She also traveled to England in 1878, a high point of her career, to deliver addresses in London and in other cities.

Molloy became a member of the Women's Christian Temperance Union and in 1875 was elected vice president of the Indiana chapter. The WCTU formed out of the growing Women's Crusade movement in the midwestern United States.Frances E. Willard, leader the WCTU, called Molloy "a much better speaker than any woman now before the public as a temperance lecturer." Molloy's temperance activism also lead to invitation to speak at numerous woman's suffrage conventions.

=== Women's suffrage activist ===
Biographer Martha M. Pickrell states that Molloy used her editorial writing to promote "the advancement and of women". and women's suffrage, as well as self-reliance and increased opportunities for women in education and the workplace. Molloy was a longtime supporter of women's rights, having written on the matter as a young adult and later through her published articles and in her speeches. After attending the Western Woman Suffrage Convention in Chicago, Illinois, in 1869, she delivered her first lecture on the subject in 1870 in South Bend, Indiana, and other nearby communities.

Although Molloy's activism did not have a strong focus on the women's suffrage movement, it overlapped with the temperance movement, a major interest for Molloy, and she did not hesitate to voice her support for the suffragists. Molloy's notoriety in the temperance movement, as well as her role as a female journalist, provided additional opportunities for her to speak at suffrage conventions. She also wrote articles, often using pseudonyms such as Aunt Nabby and Mrs. Pat Molloy, among others, for two women's suffrage newspapers, The Woman's Journal which Lucy Stone and Henry Browne Blackwell founded in 1870, and The Revolution, which suffragists Elizabeth Cady Stanton and Susan B. Anthony edited and published. In addition to writing for these suffrage journals, Molloy wrote her own articles written for the South Bend National Union and the Elkhart Observer. The Molloys' newspapers also carried reprints of articles and editorials written by Stanton, Anthony, and other reformers.

== Later years ==
After divorcing Edward Molloy in 1882, she became more involved in lecturing on temperance. In 1885 Molloy abandoned her career as a journalist and became active in the Methodist Church, serving in an unofficial capacity as an evangelist preacher. She also continued be active in the WCTU. Molloy moved with her children to Illinois in 1882 and spent two challenging years in Kansas and Missouri, where her reputation and career were damaged after she and her foster daughter, Cora (Lee) Graham, were falsely implicated in a local murder. After the women were cleared of all charges in 1888, Molloy moved to the Pacific Northwest. She married Morris Barrett in 1889 and spent her final years as a Christian evangelist in the Pacific Northwest, using Port Townsend, Washington, as her home base.

=== George Graham trial ===
Through her work in the temperance movement, Molloy developed a friendship with George Graham, an ex-convict, and suggested that he be hired as the business manager of the Morning and Day of Reform, the newspaper for which Molloy also worked in Elgin, Illinois. Graham and his wife, Sarah, along with their two children, followed Molloy and her daughters to Washington, Kansas, where the two families shared Molloy's home. Although Sarah Graham and her children returned to Indiana, her husband, George, agreed to stay and manage a farm that Molloy had purchased in Springfield, Missouri. While Graham managed the farm, Molloy continued to travel extensively, delivering public lectures around the United States. In 1885 Graham, who claimed to have divorced his first wife, married Molloy's foster daughter, Cora Lee.

In 1886, after the remains of a woman and some of Sarah Graham's clothing were found on her Missouri farm, Molloy and her foster daughter found themselves swept up in the murder case of Graham's first wife. Graham, who was found to be a bigamist, was convicted and lynched for the murder in 1886. Although Molloy and her daughter were released from custody and cleared of the charges, the sensationalized coverage of the events in the local press and the conspiracy theories about the two women's alleged involvement in the murder damaged Molloy's career. Molloy left Kansas in 1888, after she and her daughter, Cora Lee, were cleared of the charges. Molloy then moved with her daughter, De'Etta, to Port Townsend, Washington.

=== Evangelist ===
In 1889 Molloy married Morris Barrett, a cousin, and the couple established a home in Port Townsend, Washington. Molloy continued her work with prohibition, the WCTU, and the Methodist Church for the rest of her life. She became an evangelical preacher in the Pacific Northwest and continued to spread her ideas on prohibition in her final years.

== Death and legacy ==
In 1907, while making an extended trip to California, Molloy, now a widow, contracted pneumonia and died in Cedarville, California, on May 14, 1907, at the age of sixty-seven. Her remains are buried at Red Man Cemetery in Port Townsend, Washington. Molloy is remembered for her work as a journalist, temperance advocate, public speaker, women's suffrage activist, and Christian evangelist.

== Honors and awards ==
A stained-glass was installed in her honor in Trinity Church in Port Townsend, Washington.

== Popular Culture ==
- "Grandmother's Cot" Words by Emma Barrett Molloy, 1870, music by Arthur Baker.
