= L. J. C. Daniels =

American suffragist

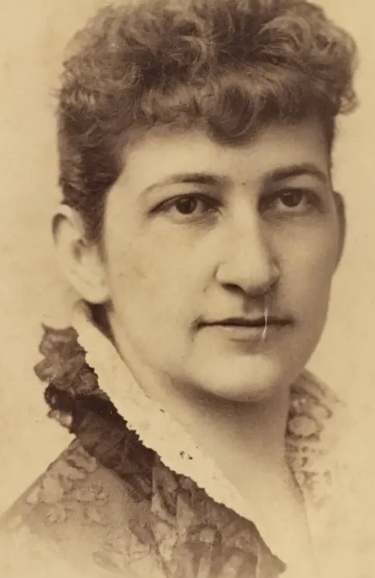
- Born: Lucy Joselyn Cutler Daniels; November 5, 1858; Grafton, Vermont
- Died: June 10, 1949 (aged 90); Bellows Falls, Vermont
- Burial place: Grafton Village Cemetery, Grafton, Vermont
- Education: New York University (JD)
- Occupation: Suffragist
- Organization(s): National American Woman Suffrage Association; National Woman's Party
- Movement: Women's Suffrage in the United States

Lucy Joselyn Cutler Daniels (November 5, 1858 – June 10, 1949), known best by her initials L. J. C. Daniels, was an American suffragist and political activist from Vermont. Daniels is best known for her protests for women's suffrage by refusing to pay taxes on her property, as well as her staunch support for working-class and Black women to receive the vote. Daniels participated in multiple protests and demonstrations in front of the White House and Capitol building, as well as in Boston.

== Early life and education ==
Daniels was born in Grafton, Vermont to the wealthy family of Francis Daniels, a speculator, and Lucy Barrett. The Danielses had six children, including Lucy. Daniels graduated from New York University in 1896 with a Juris Doctor degree. Daniels was known as an eccentric in Grafton. She always travelled by bus and never sat down the entire way.

== Activism ==
Daniels protested heavily against President Woodrow Wilson, ultimately being jailed on three separate occasions. As a wealthy suffragist, Daniels used her property to protest, refusing to pay property taxes. In response, local officials in Grafton auctioned off her bank stock inherited from her father. She then wrote on the front of a building she owned "A-SQUARE-DEAL: Votes for Vermont Women." In 1911, a tax collector came to auction off Daniels' remaining assets. The collector reminded Daniels that she could vote in school meetings, to which Daniels responded by pointing to her housekeeper, explaining that until the working-class women of Vermont could vote, she would not either.

Daniels was heavily involved in the National American Woman Suffrage Association and consistently lobbied Alice Paul to recruit and include Black women in the fight for suffrage. She associated the women's cause with race discrimination and sent a letter to Vermont Congressman Carroll Page stating that women would "solve our problem just as for the Negroes -- with a federal amendment".

In 1917, Daniels traveled to Washington, D.C. to protest at the White House gates, she was imprisoned. She returned in 1918 to protest at the Capitol and again in 1919 to protest at the White House, and was again jailed. When President Wilson returned from the Paris Peace Conference in 1919, Daniels traveled to Boston to meet the S.S George Washington and protests against the president. She was, again, jailed.

== Vegetarianism ==
Daniels was a vegetarian. She was president of the National Vegetarian Society.

== Death ==
Daniels died at Rockingham Hospital in Bellows Falls, aged 90.
