= Annette W. Parmelee =

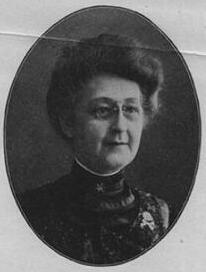
Annette W. Parmelee, 1917

Annette Watson Parmelee (April 7, 1865 - August 1, 1924) was an active suffragist from Vermont. She was involved with legislative issues relating to women's suffrage and the temperance movement. Parmelee was known as the "Suffragette Hornet" in her home state.

== Biography ==
Annette Watson was born in Washington, Vermont to Jefferson and Carrie Watson in April 7, 1865. Her parents were farmers and ensured that she received a good education and "religious training." She studied teaching at Goddard Seminary in Barre, Vermont. After teaching for a few years, she went on to train as a nurse at the Mary Fletcher Hospital in Burlington, Vermont. She graduated from the nursing training program in 1885.

She married Edward J. Parmelee on December 25, 1889. After she was married, Parmelee stopped working as a nurse and became very involved with the local Methodist Episcopal Church in Enosburgh, Vermont. She became an active member of the Women's Home Missionary Society and the Woman's Christian Temperance Union (WCTU). She went on to advocate for women's suffrage through the WCTU, believing that the woman's vote would help advance the temperance cause.

In 1900, Parmelee attended the annual convention of the state suffrage association. Parmelee became the press secretary for this group, now known as the Vermont Equal Suffrage Association (VESA), in 1907. In 1908, Parmelee was able to show "that she had written every newspaper editor in the state and had received several replies." Parmelee was well-known for her literary wit throughout the state. Parmelee was very active in women's suffrage in the state between 1910 and 1911, when she sent out mail, circulars, and leaflets all over the state. She provided copies of the Women's Journal to relevant school and state libraries and created her own pamphlet about suffrage: Seventeen Reasons Why Women Should Vote.

As an advocate for women's suffrage, Parmelee became so well-known in the state legislature, that she was known as the "Suffragette Hornet" in the statehouse. Parmelee spoke in favor of the Municipal women's suffrage bill in 1908. She addressed the state assembly chamber in November of 1910. Parmelee was one of 460 women who demanded in August of 1920 that the Vermont governor, Percival W. Clement call a special session to ratify the Nineteenth Amendment to grant women the right to vote. After women earned the right to vote, she became active in the state chapter of the League of Women Voters.

Parmelee died on August 1, 1924 after a year's long illness. She was buried at Missisquoi Cemetery.
