= Clarina I. H. Nichols =

American journalist

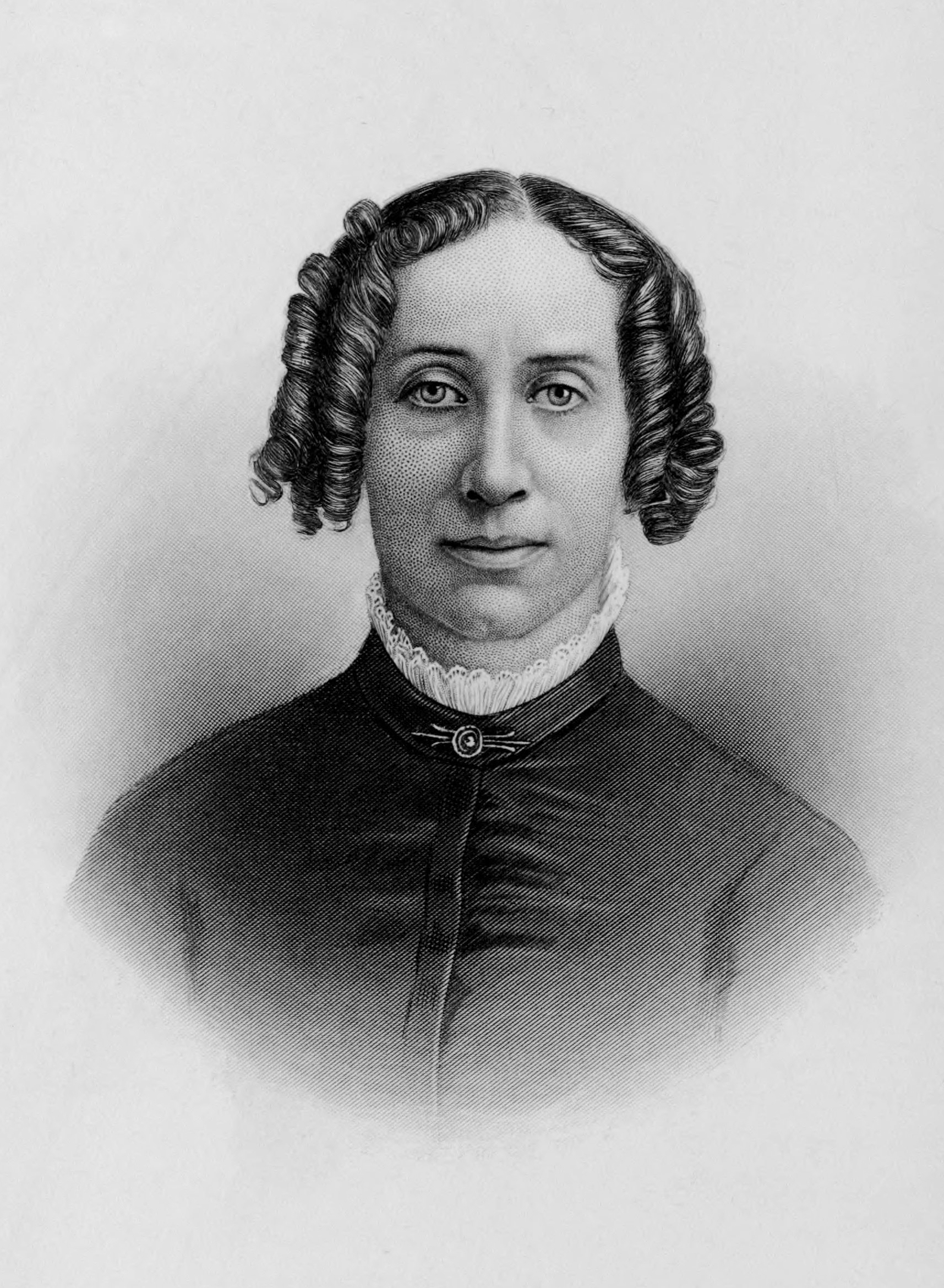
- Born: Clarina Irene Howard; January 25, 1810; Townshend, Vermont
- Died: January 11, 1885 (aged 74); California
- Occupations: journalist lobbyist public speaker
- Spouses: Justin Carpenter (m. 1830; div. 1843); George Washington Nichols (m. 1843)
- Children: 3

Clarina Irene Howard Nichols (January 25, 1810 – January 11, 1885) was a journalist, lobbyist, and public speaker involved in all three of the major reform movements of the mid-19th century: temperance, abolition, and the women's movement that emerged largely out of the ranks of the first two. Though prominent enough in her time to merit her own chapter in Anthony's History of Woman Suffrage, Nichols has been overlooked since 1900 and only recently have her contributions to equal rights undergone a reassessment.

== Biography ==
Clarina Irene Howard was born in West Townshend, Vermont in 1810, into a prosperous New England family. She graduated from a private school at the age of 18 and proceeded to teach for two years. In 1830, she married Justin Carpenter, with whom she had one daughter, Birsha, and two sons, Chapin and Aurelius.

Carpenter tried to start a school and a newspaper, both of which failed. He moved his family to New York City in the mid-1830s and squandered the rest of the family's finances. During this time, Clarina operated a boarding house, cooking, sewing, and cleaning for professional men and their wives visiting the city. Unable to support herself, her children, and her husband who could not or would not keep steady employment, Clarina took her children to her parent's home and abandoned Carpenter in 1839.

Clarina's failed marriage played a large role in her later women's rights career. Divorce was difficult to secure in the 19th century, and under marital laws, Clarina had no right to her children or to control her own finances. Vermont had some of the more liberal divorce laws in the nation, including the ability to divorce for "intolerable severity," but it still required special approval from the state Supreme Court and only applied to Vermont residents. Clarina's marriage had collapsed in New York. It took special legislation, including testimony from Clarina herself, to open up a loophole in the law and allow her to secure her divorce. Part of the new law required three year residency in the state before she could apply. She finally received her divorce in 1843.

It was in this context that Clarina Howard began to delve into public writing. She began sending prose and poetry to newspapers in Brattleboro, Vermont, notably the Whig-backed Vermont Phoenix and the Democratic Windham County Democrat. The Democrat's editor, George Nichols, particularly liked here writing, and she began clipping and penning articles for him beginning in 1841. The two married in 1843.

It was rare for women to work publicly as editors in the nineteenth century, and even more rare that they would actively participate in politics. But Clarina, now Clarina Nichols, frequently wrote for her husband’s paper on topics such as elections, women's rights, temperance, and antislavery reform. Due to his declining health and her rising prominence, she took over as editor on the paper's masthead in 1853.

While fighting for women's rights in the east, the Kansas-Nebraska Act of 1854 prompted her to move west to work for the anti-slavery cause as well. After her husband died in August, she left for Kansas in October 1854 as part of a convoy sponsored by the New England Emigrant Aid Company. She and two of her sons moved to Lawrence where she was a correspondent for numerous eastern newspapers promoting the free state cause in Kansas.

In 1857, Nichols moved to the new free soil town Quindaro. Located on the Missouri River just west of Wyandotte City, this new town was sponsored by Charles Robinson, Nathaniel Simpson, and Abelard Guthrie, among others. It was formed as an attempt to grant easier access for goods and people for the free staters in Kansas' interior. Much of the land was purchased from Wyandot's who received allotments after the Treaty of 1855 attempted to terminate their nation. Quindaro is a Wyandot word which means "bundle of sticks." The town was named after Guthrie's Wyandot wife, Nancy Quindaro Brown.

In Quindaro, Nichols again took an editorial seat. She joined Rev. John M. Walden as editor of the Chindowan, another Wyandot name which means "leader." This paper preached antislavery politics and the Temperance cause. Nichols remained a leader in both in Quindaro, including sponsoring a petition to rid the town of liquor that led to a minor riot. She was also a member of the Quindaro Literary Society. This reading group morphed into an antislavery organization, meeting at a house designated "Uncle Tom's Cabin," and had several members who helped enslaved people escape on the Underground Railroad.

Quindaro did not last long as a town. The Panic of 1857 led to a financial collapse among speculators and business owners in the town. The population declined leading up the American Civil War in 1861. After that point, many residents fled to Wyandotte City or other locations in Kansas. By 1862, a Kansas Cavalry unit occupied the town and tore down many of the remaining structures.

Nichols left as well. She went east to Washington D.C. and served as a clerk in the Quartermaster's Department. These new clerk positions opened the professional world for women as men entered the military. Even earning substantially less than a man working the same job, Nichols earned $725 per year by 1865.

Nichols moved from the War Department to the Home for Destitute Colored Women and Children in Georgetown, taking over as matron. She worked there to provide for the recently freed enslaved people flooding the city. Her daughter, Birsha, also worked with her, and adopted a child.

In 1866, Nichols returned to Kansas. She left Quindaro for Wyandotte City in 1867. Despite her continued efforts, moves towards women's rights hit walls in the Kansas Legislature. In 1871, she decided to move west again, now to California. Though not as actively politically in the state as she was in Kansas, Nichols continued to write for publications in the east pushing for women's rights.

She died in California on January 11, 1885.

== Activism ==
Clarina Nichols was a prominent spokesperson in women's rights, temperance, and antislavery politics. Her own divorce spurred her desire to advocate for women's rights. Much of her message around this issue centered on the need for mothers to have a claim to their own children and to be able to control their finances to provide for their family if their husband could not or would not. She had experienced both of these situations in her own failed marriage to Justin Carpenter.

Nichols began her career as a moderate on many issues, including women's rights, but gradually shifted her views. Initially, for example, she opposed women voting. Instead, she promoted what she and others considered the natural rights of mothers to preserve and protect the family. This meant that most of her reform efforts in the 1840s focused on property and custody rights for women, especially in marriage. Entering politics was seen as debasing to women, a common view at the time.

Gradually, her opinions changed. Nichols attended the inaugural National Women's Rights Convention in 1850. There, she joined the Education Committee and eventually rose to Vice-President alongside Paulina Davis in 1851. In October 1852, Nichols helped organize the first of several petitions submitted to the Vermont legislature to give women the right to vote in school meetings.

In the 1850s, Nichols began speaking publicly as well as writing, including addressing the Vermont state house, something no woman had done before. She also went on lecture tours with other women's rights advocates. In Kansas, she was part of a petition campaign to include women's voting in the first state constitution. She even spoke at the Wyandotte Convention in 1859. No longer a moderate, by the time she left Kansas in 1871, it was to go west where women's rights were more accepted.

Her antislavery career too began from a moderate position. Writing for a Democratic paper in the 1840s restricted her ability to criticize the institution, but Vermont politics leaned more towards free soilism than to proslavery arguments. Her husband aligned his paper with a pro-Union stance in the 1840s, meaning he did not support proslavery politics, but was not willing to challenge slavery's expansion at the expense of national harmony.

Nichols time in Kansas brought her more in line with the radical abolitionists around her in that state. As a member of the Quindaro Literary Society, she helped at least one enslaved person escape before the Civil War. During that conflict, she hid a freedom seeker named Caroline in her cistern while fourteen slave patrollers hunted her.

Nichols was also more racially egalitarian than many antislavery advocates. She called for allowing free black people to move to Kansas and supported the interracial school her daughter ran in Quindaro. This put her at odds with moderates in the growing Republican party.

Temperance was also one of Nichols' driving interests. Just as she promoted women's rights to help them defend their families, she promoted temperance in the name of family safety. Drunken husbands might ruin their families financially or abuse them physically. Women had a moral role, according to reformers like Nichols, to push alcohol out of their homes. She advocated for these policies in the east and out west in Kansas.

== Commemoration ==
A painting by Phyllis Garibay-Coon depicting her and other Kansas suffragists was unveiled at the Kansas Statehouse in January 2025. It is titled "Rebel Women" and is the first art installation by any woman artist to be in the Kansas Statehouse.

== See also ==
- Aurelius O. Carpenter, her son
